= List of cities, towns and villages in Ilam province =

A list of cities, towns and villages in Ilam Province of south-western Iran:

== Alphabetical ==
Cities are in bold text; all others are villages.

=== A ===
Ab Cheshmeh | Abanar | Abbasabad | Abbasabad | Abdanan | Abhar-e Pain | Abtaf-e Olya | Abtaf-e Sofla | Abu Ghoveyr | Abu Qarib | Abzar | Agreh Bid | Ahangaran-e Kaviani | Ahmadabad | Ali Morad Khani-ye Olya | Ali Morad Khani-ye Sofla | Aliabad | Aliabad | Aliabad-e Bozorg | Aliabad-e Kuchak | Aliabad-e Olya | Aliabad-e Sofla | Aliabad-e Vosta | Aligah | Amma | Anarak | Anjir | Anjireh Vatisheh Kand | Anqolab-e Do | Anqolab-e Yek | Aradan | Arakvaz | Armu | Asadabad-e Sofla | Asadabad-e Vosta | Asemanabad | Avareh | Avehza

=== B ===
Baba Shams | Babagir | Babamoradi-e Olya | Badreh | Baghleh | Baghleh-ye Olya | Bahar Ab | Bahmanabad-e Olya | Bala Dashteh | Balata | Balavah | Balaveh Khoshkeh | Baleyn | Baliyan | Ban Gonbad | Ban Kalvali | Ban Rahman | Banbur-e Farkhinvand | Ban-e Amrud | Ban-e Rushan | Ban-e Sarv | Ban-e Vizeh | Ban-e Ziarat | Banhalan-e Bala | Bankat | Banlakan | Banqalan | Banqola | Banzerkah | Baraftab-e Bi | Baraftab-e Chalab Zard | Baraftab-e Meleh Maran | Bardeh Bal | Bardi | Bareh Bijeh | Barikeh-ye Farkhinevand | Barzah-e Khuran | Baskeleh-ye Garmeh | Bavalak | Beg Beg-e Ban Khoshg | Belavah Tareh-ye Olya | Belavah Tareh-ye Sofla | Beyt-e Fazieh | Bisheh Deraz | Bishi-ye Olya | Bon Baba Jan | Borom-e Pain | Buolhasan | Bustaneh | Buzhan

=== C ===
Chahar Meleh | Chal Khoshk | Chalanchi | Chaleh Chaleh | Chaleh Siah | Chalsara | Cham Ab | Cham Anar-e Sofla | Cham Bur-e Farkhinvand | Cham Charud | Cham Hendi | Cham Jangal | Cham Kabud | Cham Kabud | Cham Namesht | Cham Push | Cham Quleh | Cham Ruteh | Cham Shalan | Cham Sorkh | Cham Zard-e Mahizan | Cham Zhab | Cham Zhiyeh | Chaman-e Seyyed Mohammad | Cham-e Chameh | Cham-e Dar Balut | Cham-e Shir | Changiyeh-ye Qajar | Chap va Rast | Chaqa Sabz | Charmel | Chavar | Chaviz | Chega | Chegeni | Chehel Zari | Chenan | Chenar Bashi | Chenar-e Allah Qoli | Cheshmeh Barik | Cheshmeh Chai-ye Olya | Cheshmeh Chai-ye Sofla | Cheshmeh Chai-ye Vosta | Cheshmeh Davi | Cheshmeh Kabud | Cheshmeh Khazaneh | Cheshmeh Mahi | Cheshmeh Meru | Cheshmeh Pahn | Cheshmeh Pahn | Cheshmeh Rashid | Cheshmeh Shirin | Cheshmeh Sorkh | Cheshmeh-ye Shir Ali | Cheshmeh-ye Shirin Rashnow | Cheshmeh-ye Shirin Shah Ahmad | Chighab | Chitlan | Choqa Balak-e Chalab Zard | Choqa Balak-e Harqorush | Choqa Kabud | Choqa Mahi | Choqapukeh

=== D ===
Dalpari | Damrud | Dar Eshgaft | Dar Parusheh | Dar Tut | Darab | Darageh | Darbid-e Karani | Darreh Barik | Darreh Chapi | Darreh Dul | Darreh Shahr | Dartut | Darvand | Darvand-e Sartang | Dashtabad-e Olya | Dashtabad-e Sofla | Dasht-e Abbas | Dehloran | Delfanabad | Delgosha | Divaneh | Do Ab | Do Biran-e Olya | Do Biran-e Sofla | Dogar | Dul Golab | Dul Kabud-e Khvoshadul | Dul Kalan | Dul Zard-e Zirtang | Dul-e Moniri

=== E ===
Elyasabad | Emamzadeh Abbas | Emarat | Eslamabad-e Olya | Eslamabad-e Sofla | Eslamiyeh | Esmaili-ye Olya | Esmaili-ye Sofla | Eyn Khvosh | Eyn Savleh | Eyvan

=== F ===
Fadak | Farhadabad | Farrokhabad | Farrokhabad | Fatemiyeh | Fatemiyeh | Fatemiyeh | Fathabad | Fazelabad

=== G ===
Gach Kuban | Gadmeh | Galhi | Galleh Dar | Galmeh | Galuzeh Mashhad | Gandab | Ganjeh | Ganjevan | Garab Khvoshadul | Garab | Garazan-e Pain | Garmabad | Gatareh | Gav Savar | Gavdul | Gereh Cheqa | Gholamabad | Ghoslak | Gilaneh | Godar-e Namak | Gol Darreh | Gol Gol-e Olya | Gol Gol-e Olya | Gol Gol-e Sofla | Gol Gol-e Sofla | Golan | Goleh Jar | Golzar-e Haddad | Gonbad-e Pir Mohammad | Gorz-e Langar | Gulab | Gurab-e Olya | Gurab-e Olya | Gurab-e Sofla | Gurab-e Sofla

=== H ===
Haft Cheshmeh | Haft Cheshmeh | Haft Kadeh | Hajji Bakhtiar | Hajji Hazer | Halat | Halehsam | Hamgam | Haranmar | Harkabud-e Golzar | Hasan Gavdari | Hashemabad | Hava Dul | Havian | Heliveh | Hesar-e Shaveh | Heydarabad | Heydarabad | Heyvand | Hoseynabad | Hungeh

=== I ===
Ilam Cement Plant | Ilam Industrial Estate | Ilam University Farm | Ilam | Integrated Farm School | Irajabad

=== J ===
Jaber-e Ansar | Jafarabad | Jafarabad | Jahadabad | Jahangirabad | Jalizi-ye Bala | Jalizi-ye Pain | Jan Jan | Javadabad | Jol Khvor | Jub Bur | Jub Gowhar-e Olya | Jub Gowhar-e Sofla | Jub Shaleh | Jub Sorkh-e Olya | Jub Sorkh-e Sofla | Jurab Deraz Mirza Beygi

=== K ===
Kahreh | Kalak-e Naqi | Kalan | Kalateh | Kal-e Sefid | Kaleh Jub | Kaleh Qatar-e Olya | Kaleh Qatar-e Sofla | Kali Kali | Kalleh Gah | Kallehabad | Kalleh-ye Garaz | Kamangaran | Kamul | Kan-e Ahmadkhan | Kapneh Karan | Kharabanan-e Olya | Kharabanan-e Sofla | Kharbozan-e Bala | Kharbozan-e Pain | Kheybar | Khordeh Cheshmeh | Khor-e Shir Ali | Khuran-e Olya | Khuran-e Sofla | Khvosh Qadam | Kol Kol-e Olya | Kol Kol-e Olya | Kolah Kabud | Kolahjub | Kolahjub-e Olya | Kolang Bor | Kolm-e Bala | Kolm-e Pain | Kuh Neshin | Kulkani | Kurag

=== L ===
Lala | Laleh Zar | Largheh | Larini-ye Olya | Larini-ye Sofla | Lashekan | Latab | Linjab Sharif | Ludar | Lumar

=== M ===
Mahdiyeh | Mahizan-e Olya | Mahizan-e Sofla | Mahmudabad | Mahtabi | Mahuteh | Maleh Safarkhan Kheybar | Maleh-e Shirkhan | Mar Barreh | Marzabad | Maz Abd Ali-ye Bala | Maz Abd Ali-ye Pain | Mazhareh | Mazhin | Mazhin Mianeh Sorkh | Mazraeh-ye Lah Lar | Mazraeh-ye Zamiyeh | Mehdiabad | Mehr | Mehran | Menar-e Balutestan | Meydan Khalaf | Meydan | Meydar-e Olya | Meymeh | Mian Dar Zarneh | Mian Qaleh | Mian Rah-e Jaber | Mian Tang | Mir Alamdar | Mir Makan | Mirza Hoseynabad | Mivaleh-ye Olya | Mivaneh | Moradabad | Moziyeh | Mulab-e Olya | Murmuri | Murt | Musa | Mushkan | Musian

=== N ===
Naderabad | Nahr-e Anbar | Nahr-e Gholam Veys | Nahrkhan-e Olya | Nahrkhan-e Sofla | Nargesi | Nasrollahabad-e Shahid Beheshti | Negel | Nesar-e Chalab Zard | Nesar-e Meleh Maran | Ney Duleh-ye Olya | Ney Duleh-ye Sofla | Nurabad

=== P ===
Pa Qaleh | Pacham-e Deh Harun | Pacheh-ye Anjir | Pagal-e Garab | Pahleh | Pahneh Bor | Pahneh Bor | Palangabad | Palangerd | Palk Gardel | Palkaneh | Palkaneh-ye Sofla | Palkil | Panzdah-e Khordad | Pardeh | Pariab | Patak | Patak-e Arab | Patakht | Pelah Kabud | Piamen-e Olya | Piamen-e Sofla | Piazabad | Pol Kalak | Posht Qaleh | Posht Tang-e Olya | Posht Tang-e Sofla | Posht-e Aresht | Poshteh-ye Kol Kol | Poshteh-ye Mazhin | Poshteh-ye Vamarz

=== Q ===
Qadah-e Bala | Qadah-e Pain | Qadarti | Qalandar-e Olya | Qalandar-e Sofla | Qaleh Juq | Qaleh Tasmeh | Qanatabad | Qarib | Qarjiligan | Qasemabad | Qazi Khan-e Olya | Qazi Khan-e Sofla | Qebleh

=== R ===
Rah Sefid | Rezaabad | Rika | Rizehvand |

=== S ===
Sadabad | Sadaqet | Sadat Dalpari | Salehabad | Saman | Sangar Nader | Sang-e Sefid | Sanjavian | Sar Cham | Sar Choluskan-e Sofla | Sar Choqa | Sar Kamar | Sar Ney | Sar Poleh | Sarab Gur-e Tuti | Sarab | Sarabbagh | Sarab-e Kalak | Sarab-e Kalan | Sarab-e Karzan | Sarab-e Noql | Sarableh | Sarbisheh | Sarcham-e Deh Harun | Sarchamlu | Sareh Vian | Sarkan | Sarpitak | Sartang | Satian | Sefid Khani-ye Olya | Sefid Khani-ye Sofla | Sefid Khani-ye Vosta | Seyd Nazari-ye Olya | Seymereh | Shabab | Shahbazvand | Shahid Bahonar | Shahid Kashuri | Shahid Rajai | Shahrak-e Badr | Shahrak-e Chalab | Shahrak-e Changuleh | Shahrak-e Dasht Akbar | Shahrak-e Emam | Shahrak-e Eslamiyeh | Shahrak-e Esteqlal | Shahrak-e Fajr | Shahrak-e Hamzeh | Shahrak-e Hezarani | Shahrak-e Kavar Toveh Taq | Shahrak-e Mamlah | Shahrak-e Motarefeh | Shahrak-e Nabovat | Shahrak-e Nasr | Shahrak-e Qirab | Shahrak-e Qods | Shahrak-e Sadat | Shahrak-e Sartang | Shahrak-e Sartang-e Bijar | Shahrak-e Septun | Shahrak-e Shahid Kashvari | Shahrak-e Shahid Rajai | Shahrak-e Vahdat | Shahrak-e Vali-ye Asr Sar Tang-e Bahram Khani | Shahrak-e Vali-ye Asr | Shahrak-e Zu ol Faqari | Shahran | Shakheh | Shalah Kosh | Shaleh Shuri | Shan Kabud | Sharif | Shehmiar | Sheykh Makan | Sheykh Nowruz Shahrak-e Fath | Sheykh Saleh Qandi | Shilab | Shirah Choqa-ye Chalanchi | Shiravand | Shirinabad-e Gachan | Shur Mahi | Shurab-e Khan Ali | Shurabeh Khuran | Shurabeh-ye Malek | Shurabeh-ye Marate | Shureh | Siab-e Darvish | Siah Gav | Siah Gel | Siah Gel | Siah Khani | Siah Siah | Sireh Kaneh | Soltanabad | Sorkh-e Kan | Sorkheh Lijeh | Sorurabad | Sulabad

=== T ===
Takhtan | Takht-e Bastam-e Olya | Takht-e Bastam-e Sofla | Takht-e Narm | Taleqani | Talkhab | Talkhab | Talur | Tang-e Qir | Tang-e Zardeh-ye Farkhinvand | Tappeh Hammam-e Olya | Tappeh Hammam-e Sofla | Tappeh Hammam-e Vosta | Taq Tavi | Taq-e Gavarin | Taran | Tazehabad-e Zir Khaki | Tohamasab-e Olya | Tokhm-e Balut-e Olya | Tokhm-e Balut-e Sofla | Tom Tomu | Torshak | Toveh Siyeh | Towhid | Tul Ab | Turem | Tut-e Khvoshadul

=== V ===
Vachak Ab | Vachakbud-e Olya | Vachakbud-e Sofla | Vahdatabad | Vanit-e Olya | Var Kamareh | Varbar | Varegah | Vargach | Vargar | Varhal Cheshmeh Ramezan | Vari-ye Kalak | Varmian-e Sofla | Vazirabad | Vileh

=== Y ===
Yarabad-e Olya

=== Z ===
Zafarani | Zahervand-e Sofla | Zalu Ab | Zam Zaman | Zanjireh-ye Olya | Zanjireh-ye Sofla | Zarab | Zarangush | Zardaluabad | Zarneh | Zeyd | Zeytun Timeh | Zhivar | Zich | Zifal | Zir Khaki | Zir Tang | Zoheyri-ye Olya | Zoheyri-ye Sofla
