= Pahneh Bor =

Pahneh Bor or Pahneh Bar (Persian: پهنه بر) may refer to:

- Pahneh Bar, Hamadan
- Pahnehbor, Hamadan Province
- Pahneh Bor, Shirvan and Chardaval, Ilam Province
- Pahneh Bor, Shirvan, Shirvan and Chardaval County, Ilam Province
- Pahneh Bor, Kurdistan
