= Aliabad, Abdanan =

Aliabad علي آباد
- Village
- Location within Iran
- Coordinates: 32°43′00″N 47°53′00″E
- Country: Iran
- Province: Ilam
- County: Abdanan
- Bakhsh: Kalat
- Rural District: Abanar

Population (2006)
  - Total: 60
- Time zone: UTC+3:30 (IRST)

Aliabad (Persian: علي آباد, also Romanized as ‘Alīābād; also known as Darreh Kāvolī) is a village in Abanar Rural District, Kalat District, Abdanan County, Ilam Province, Iran. The 2006 census reported its population as 60 citizens between 14 families. The village is populated by Lurs.
