= Hungeh =

Hungeh حونگه
- Village
- Country: Iran
- Province: Ilam
- County: Abdanan
- Bakhsh: Kalat
- Rural District: Abanar

Population (2006)
  - Total: 211
- Time zone: UTC+3:30 (IRST)
  - Summer (DST): UTC+4:30 (IRDT)

Hungeh (Persian: حونگه, also Romanized as Ḩūngeh) is a village in Abanar Rural District, Kalat District, Abdanan County, Ilam Province, Iran. At the 2006 census, its population was 211, in 31 families. The village is populated by Lurs.
