= Heliveh =

Heliveh هليوه
- Village
- Location within Iran
- Coordinates: 32°43′48″N 47°51′21″E
- Country: Iran
- Province: Ilam
- County: Abdanan
- Bakhsh: Kalat
- Rural District: Abanar

Population (2006)
  - Total: 350
- Time zone: UTC+3:30 (IRST)
  - Summer (DST): UTC+4:30 (IRDT)

Heliveh (Persian: هليوه, also Romanized as Helīveh and Ḩalīveh) is a village in Abanar Rural District, Kalat District, Abdanan County, Ilam Province, Iran. At the 2006 census, its population was 350, in 72 families. The village is populated by Lurs.
