= Charmel =

Charmel چرمل
- Village
- Location within Iran
- Coordinates: 32°41′00″N 47°51′00″E
- Country: Iran
- Province: Ilam
- County: Abdanan
- Bakhsh: Kalat
- Rural District: Abanar

Population (2006)
  - Total: 58
- Time zone: UTC+3:30 (IRST)
  - Summer (DST): UTC+4:30 (IRDT)

Charmel (Persian: چرمل) is a village in Abanar Rural District, Kalat District, Abdanan County, Ilam Province, Iran. At the 2006 census, its population was 58, in 12 families. The village is populated by Lurs.
