= Chap va Rast =

Chap va Rast چپوراست
- Village
- Location within Iran
- Coordinates: 32°40′00″N 47°52′00″E
- Country: Iran
- Province: Ilam
- County: Abdanan
- Bakhsh: Kalat
- Rural District: Abanar

Population (2006)
  - Total: 51
- Time zone: UTC+3:30 (IRST)
  - Summer (DST): UTC+4:30 (IRDT)

Chap va Rast (Persian: چپوراست, also Romanized as Chap va Rāst; also known as Chap Rāst) is a village in Abanar Rural District, Kalat District, Abdanan County, Ilam Province, Iran. At the 2006 census, its population was 51, in 9 families. The village is populated by Lurs.
