= Kuh Neshin =

Kuh Neshin كوه نشين
- Village
- Location within Iran
- Coordinates: 32°53′00″N 47°48′00″E
- Country: Iran
- Province: Ilam
- County: Darreh Shahr
- Bakhsh: Majin
- Rural District: Majin

Population (2006)
  - Total: 29
- Time zone: UTC+3:30 (IRST)
  - Summer (DST): UTC+4:30 (IRDT)

Kuh Neshin (Persian: كوه نشين, also Romanized as Kūh Neshīn) is a village in Majin Rural District, Majin District, Darreh Shahr County, Ilam Province, Iran. According to the 2006 census, its population was 29, with six families.
