= Palangerd =

Palangerd پلنگرد
- Village
- Location within Iran
- Coordinates: 33°50′30″N 46°16′22″E
- Country: Iran
- Province: Ilam
- County: Eyvan
- Bakhsh: Central
- Rural District: Nabovat

Population (2006)
  - Total: 439
- Time zone: UTC+3:30 (IRST)
  - Summer (DST): UTC+4:30 (IRDT)

Palangerd (Persian: پلنگرد) is a village in Nabovat Rural District, in the Central District of Eyvan County, Ilam Province, Iran. At the 2006 census, its population was 439, in 78 families. The village is populated by Kurds.
