= Ghoslak =

Ghoslak غسلك
- Village
- Location within Iran
- Coordinates: 33°39′02″N 46°38′31″E
- Country: Iran
- Province: Ilam
- County: Sirvan
- Bakhsh: Karezan
- Rural District: Zangvan

Population (2006)
  - Total: 41
- Time zone: UTC+3:30 (IRST)
  - Summer (DST): UTC+4:30 (IRDT)

Ghoslak (Persian: غسلك) is a village in Zangvan Rural District, Karezan District, Sirvan County, Ilam Province, Iran. At the 2006 census, its population was 41, in 8 families. The village is populated by Kurds.
