= Nahr-e Gholam Veys =

Nahr-e Gholam Veys نهرغلام ويس
- Village
- Location within Iran
- Coordinates: 33°51′54″N 46°15′19″E
- Country: Iran
- Province: Ilam
- County: Eyvan
- Bakhsh: Central
- Rural District: Nabovat

Population (2006)
  - Total: 340
- Time zone: UTC+3:30 (IRST)
  - Summer (DST): UTC+4:30 (IRDT)

Nahr-e Gholam Veys (Persian: نهرغلام ويس, also romanized as Nahr-e Gholām Veys) is a village in Nabovat Rural District, in the Central District of Eyvan County, Ilam Province, Iran. At the 2006 census, its population was 340, in 78 families. The village is populated by Kurds.
