= Vanit-e Olya =

Vanit-e Olya ونيت عليا
- Village
- Location within Iran
- Coordinates: 33°50′11″N 46°13′34″E
- Country: Iran
- Province: Ilam
- County: Eyvan
- Bakhsh: Central
- Rural District: Nabovat

Population (2006)
  - Total: 178
- Time zone: UTC+3:30 (IRST)
  - Summer (DST): UTC+4:30 (IRDT)

Vanit-e Olya (Persian: ونيت عليا, also Romanized as Vanīt-e ‘Olyā; also known as Vanīt) is a village in Nabovat Rural District, in the Central District of Eyvan County, Ilam Province, Iran. At the 2006 census, its population was 178, in 33 families. The village is populated by Kurds.
