= Abtaf-e Sofla =

Village in Ilam, Iran

Abtaf-e Sofla ابطاف سفلي
- Village
- Location within Iran
- Coordinates: 32°38′34″N 47°48′45″E
- Country: Iran
- Province: Ilam
- County: Abdanan
- Bakhsh: Kalat
- Rural District: Murmuri

Population (2006)
  - Total: 117
- Time zone: UTC+3:30 (IRST)
  - Summer (DST): UTC+4:30 (IRDT)

Abtaf-e Sofla (Persian: ابطاف سفلي, also Romanized as Ābţāf-e Soflá; also known as Ābţāf) is a village in Murmuri Rural District, Kalat District, Abdanan County, Ilam Province, Iran. At the 2006 census, its population was 117, in 23 families. The village is populated by Lurs.
