= Takht-e Narm =

Takht-e Narm تخت نرم
- Village
- Location within Iran
- Coordinates: 32°53′56″N 47°55′51″E
- Country: Iran
- Province: Ilam
- County: Darreh Shahr
- Bakhsh: Majin
- Rural District: Majin

Population (2006)
  - Total: 80
- Time zone: UTC+3:30 (IRST)
  - Summer (DST): UTC+4:30 (IRDT)

Takht-e Narm (Persian: تخت نرم) is a village in Majin Rural District, Majin District, Darreh Shahr County, Ilam Province, Iran. At the 2006 census, its population was 80, in 13 families.
