= Sefid Khani-ye Olya =

Sefid Khani-ye Olya سفيدخاني عليا
- Village
- Location within Iran
- Coordinates: 33°39′50″N 46°36′07″E
- Country: Iran
- Province: Ilam
- County: Sirvan
- Bakhsh: Karezan
- Rural District: Zangvan

Population (2006)
  - Total: 27
- Time zone: UTC+3:30 (IRST)
  - Summer (DST): UTC+4:30 (IRDT)

Sefid Khani-ye Olya (Persian: سفيدخاني عليا, also Romanized as Sefīd Khānī-ye ‘Olyā; also known as Sefīd Khānī) is a village in Zangvan Rural District, Karezan District, Sirvan County Ilam Province, Iran. At the 2006 census, its population was 27, in 9 families. The village is populated by Kurds.
