= Hasan Gavdari =

Hasan Gavdari حسن گاوداري
- Village
- Location within Iran
- Coordinates: 33°34′29″N 46°41′15″E
- Country: Iran
- Province: Ilam
- County: Sirvan
- Bakhsh: Karezan
- Rural District: Zangvan

Population (2006)
  - Total: 432
- Time zone: UTC+3:30 (IRST)
  - Summer (DST): UTC+4:30 (IRDT)

Hasan Gavdari (Persian: حسن گاوداري, also Romanized as Ḩasan Gāvdārī; also known as Ḩasan) is a village in Zangvan Rural District, Karezan District, Sirvan County, Ilam Province, Iran. At the 2006 census, its population was 432, in 94 families. The village is populated by Lurs.
