= Kallehabad =

Kallehabad كله باد
- Village
- Country: Iran
- Province: Ilam
- County: Darreh Shahr
- Bakhsh: Majin
- Rural District: Majin

Population (2006)
  - Total: 59
- Time zone: UTC+3:30 (IRST)
  - Summer (DST): UTC+4:30 (IRDT)

Kallehabad (Persian: كله باد, also Romanized as Kallehabād) is a village in Majin Rural District, Majin District, Darreh Shahr County, Ilam Province, Iran. At the 2006 census, its population was 59, in 10 families.
