= Javadabad, Ilam =

Javadabad جواداباد
- Village
- Location within Iran
- Coordinates: 32°58′16″N 47°48′19″E
- Country: Iran
- Province: Ilam
- County: Darreh Shahr
- Bakhsh: Majin
- Rural District: Majin

Population (2006)
  - Total: 107
- Time zone: UTC+3:30 (IRST)
  - Summer (DST): UTC+4:30 (IRDT)

Javadabad (Persian: جواداباد, also Romanized as Javādābād) is a village in Majin Rural District, Majin District, Darreh Shahr County, Ilam Province, Iran. At the 2006 census, its population was 107, in 23 families. The village is populated by Lurs.
