= Satian =

Satian ساتيان
- village
- Satian
- Location within Iran
- Coordinates: 33°53′03″N 46°14′13″E
- Country: Iran
- Province: Ilam
- County: Eyvan
- Bakhsh: Central
- Rural District: Nabovat
- Time zone: UTC+3:30 (IRST)
  - Summer (DST): UTC+4:30 (IRDT)

Satian is a village in the Ilam province of Iran, located in the village of Nevut in the central part of Eyvan County.The village is mostly populated by Kurds.
