= Kan-e Ahmadkhan =

Kan-e Ahmadkhan كن احمدخان
- Village
- Location within Iran
- Coordinates: 32°40′00″N 47°50′00″E
- Country: Iran
- Province: Ilam
- County: Abdanan
- Bakhsh: Kalat
- Rural District: Murmuri

Population (2006)
  - Total: 34
- Time zone: UTC+3:30 (IRST)
  - Summer (DST): UTC+4:30 (IRDT)

Kan-e Ahmadkhan (Persian: كن احمدخان, also Romanized as Kan-e Aḩmadkhān) is a village in Murmuri Rural District, Kalat District, Abdanan County, Ilam Province, Iran. At the 2006 census, its population was 34, in 7 families. The village is populated by Lurs.
