= Aligah =

Aligah عليگه
- Village
- Location within Iran
- Coordinates: 33°51′14″N 46°14′10″E
- Country: Iran
- Province: Ilam
- County: Eyvan
- Bakhsh: Central
- Rural District: Nabovat

Population (2006)
  - Total: 196
- Time zone: UTC+3:30 (IRST)
  - Summer (DST): UTC+4:30 (IRDT)

Aligah (Persian: عليگه, also Romanized as ‘Alīgah) is a village in Nabovat Rural District, in the Central District of Eyvan County, Ilam Province, Iran. At the 2006 census, its population was 196, in 36 families. The village is populated by Kurds.
