= Hava Dul =

Hava Dul هوادول
- Village
- Location within Iran
- Coordinates: 32°57′00″N 47°49′18″E
- Country: Iran
- Province: Ilam
- County: Darreh Shahr
- Bakhsh: Majin
- Rural District: Majin

Population (2006)
  - Total: 38
- Time zone: UTC+3:30 (IRST)
  - Summer (DST): UTC+4:30 (IRDT)

Hava Dul (Persian: هوادول, also Romanized as Havā Dūl) is a village in Majin Rural District, Majin District, Darreh Shahr County, Ilam Province, Iran. At the 2006 census, its population was 38, in 6 families. The village is populated by Lurs.
