= Mazhin Mianeh Sorkh =

Mazhin Mianeh Sorkh ماژين ميانه سرخ
- Village
- Country: Iran
- Province: Ilam
- County: Eyvan
- Bakhsh: Central
- Rural District: Nabovat

Population (2006)
  - Total: 438
- Time zone: UTC+3:30 (IRST)
  - Summer (DST): UTC+4:30 (IRDT)

Mazhin Mianeh Sorkh (Persian: ماژين ميانه سرخ, also Romanized as Māzhīn Mīāneh Sorkh) is a village in Nabovat Rural District, in the Central District of Eyvan County, Ilam Province, Iran. At the 2006 census, its population was 438, in 76 families. The village is populated by Kurds.
