= Nesar-e Meleh Maran =

Nesar-e Meleh Maran نسارمله ماران
- Village
- Location within Iran
- Coordinates: 33°35′29″N 46°42′07″E
- Country: Iran
- Province: Ilam
- County: Sirvan
- Bakhsh: Karezan
- Rural District: Zangvan

Population (2006)
  - Total: 232
- Time zone: UTC+3:30 (IRST)
  - Summer (DST): UTC+4:30 (IRDT)

Nesar-e Meleh Maran (Persian: نسارمله ماران, also Romanized as Neşār-e Meleh Mārān and Nes̄ār-e Maleh-ye Mārān) is a village in Zangvan Rural District, Karezan District, Sirvan County, Ilam Province, Iran. At the 2006 census, its population was 232, in 46 families. The village is populated by Kurds.
