= Damrud =

Damrud دمرود
- Village
- Location within Iran
- Coordinates: 32°55′15″N 47°52′35″E
- Country: Iran
- Province: Ilam
- County: Darreh Shahr
- Bakhsh: Majin
- Rural District: Majin

Population (2006)
  - Total: 98
- Time zone: UTC+3:30 (IRST)
  - Summer (DST): UTC+4:30 (IRDT)

Damrud (Persian: دمرود, also Romanized as Damrūd) is a village in Majin Rural District, Majin District, Darreh Shahr County, Ilam Province, Iran. At the 2006 census, its population was 98, in 20 families. The village is populated by Lurs.
