= Cham Shalan =

Cham Shalan چم شالان
- Village
- Location within Iran
- Coordinates: 32°37′26″N 47°53′35″E
- Country: Iran
- Province: Ilam
- County: Abdanan
- Bakhsh: Kalat
- Rural District: Murmuri

Population (2006)
  - Total: 71
- Time zone: UTC+3:30 (IRST)
  - Summer (DST): UTC+4:30 (IRDT)

Cham Shalan (Persian: چم شالان, also Romanized as Cham Shālān and Cham-e Shalān) is a village in Murmuri Rural District, Kalat District, Abdanan County, Ilam Province, Iran. At the 2006 census, its population was 71, in 9 families. The village is populated by Lurs.
