= Poshteh-ye Mazhin =

Poshteh-ye Mazhin پشته ماژين
- Village
- Location within Iran
- Coordinates: 32°56′00″N 47°47′00″E
- Country: Iran
- Province: Ilam
- County: Darreh Shahr
- Bakhsh: Majin
- Rural District: Majin

Population (2006)
  - Total: 245
- Time zone: UTC+3:30 (IRST)
  - Summer (DST): UTC+4:30 (IRDT)

Poshteh-ye Mazhin (Persian: پشته ماژين, also Romanized as Poshteh-ye Māzhīn) is a village in Majin Rural District, Majin District, Darreh Shahr County, Ilam Province, Iran. At the 2006 census, its population was 245, in 46 families. The village is populated by Lurs.
