= Galhi =

Galhi گلهي
- Village
- Location within Iran
- Coordinates: 32°37′39″N 47°50′40″E
- Country: Iran
- Province: Ilam
- County: Abdanan
- Bakhsh: Kalat
- Rural District: Murmuri

Population (2006)
  - Total: 58
- Time zone: UTC+3:30 (IRST)
  - Summer (DST): UTC+4:30 (IRDT)

Galhi (Persian: گلهي, also Romanized as Galhī; also known as Galehhī) is a village in Murmuri Rural District, Kalat District, Abdanan County, Ilam Province, Iran. At the 2006 census, its population was 58, in 13 families. The village is populated by Lurs.
