= Sharif, Ilam =

Sharif شريف
- Village
- Location within Iran
- Coordinates: 33°50′43″N 46°14′22″E
- Country: Iran
- Province: Ilam
- County: Eyvan
- Bakhsh: Central
- Rural District: Nabovat

Population (2006)
  - Total: 34
- Time zone: UTC+3:30 (IRST)
  - Summer (DST): UTC+4:30 (IRDT)

Sharif (Persian: شريف, also Romanized as Sharīf; also known as Jūb-e Sharīf) is a village in Nabovat Rural District, in the Central District of Eyvan County, Ilam province, Iran. At the 2006 census, its population was 34, in 6 families. The village is populated by Kurds.
