= Linjab Sharif =

Linjab Sharif لينجاب شريف
- Village
- Location within Iran
- Coordinates: 33°50′12″N 46°14′07″E
- Country: Iran
- Province: Ilam
- County: Eyvan
- Bakhsh: Central
- Rural District: Nabovat

Population (2006)
  - Total: 60
- Time zone: UTC+3:30 (IRST)
  - Summer (DST): UTC+4:30 (IRDT)

Linjab Sharif (Persian: لينجاب شريف, also Romanized as Līnjāb Sharīf; also known as Līnjāb, Līnjāv Sharīf, and Venīt Sharīf) is a village in Nabovat Rural District, in the Central District of Eyvan County, Ilam Province, Iran. At the 2006 census, its population was 60, in 13 families. The village is populated by Kurds.
