= Choqa Mahi =

Choqa Mahi چقاماهي
- Village
- Location within Iran
- Coordinates: 33°51′14″N 46°16′52″E
- Country: Iran
- Province: Ilam
- County: Eyvan
- Bakhsh: Central
- Rural District: Nabovat

Population (2006)
  - Total: 131
- Time zone: UTC+3:30 (IRST)
  - Summer (DST): UTC+4:30 (IRDT)

Choqa Mahi (Persian: چقاماهي, also Romanized as Choqā Māhī) is a village in Nabovat Rural District, in the Central District of Eyvan County, Ilam Province, Iran. At the 2006 census, its population was 131, in 23 families. The village is populated by Kurds.
