= Qalandar-e Olya =

Qalandar-e Olya قلندرعليا
- Village
- Location within Iran
- Coordinates: 33°38′39″N 46°37′42″E
- Country: Iran
- Province: Ilam
- County: Sirvan
- Bakhsh: Karezan
- Rural District: Zangvan

Population (2006)
  - Total: 66
- Time zone: UTC+3:30 (IRST)
  - Summer (DST): UTC+4:30 (IRDT)

Qalandar-e Olya (Persian: قلندرعليا, also Romanized as Qalandar-e ‘Olyā; also known as Shāh Qalandar) is a village in Zangvan Rural District, Karezan District, Sirvan County, Ilam Province, Iran. At the 2006 census, its population was 66, in 10 families. The village is populated by Kurds.
