= Varmian-e Sofla =

Varmian-e Sofla ورميان سفلي
- Village
- Location within Iran
- Coordinates: 33°39′00″N 46°39′03″E
- Country: Iran
- Province: Ilam
- County: Sirvan
- Bakhsh: Karezan
- Rural District: Zangvan

Population (2006)
  - Total: 169
- Time zone: UTC+3:30 (IRST)
  - Summer (DST): UTC+4:30 (IRDT)

Varmian-e Sofla (Persian: ورميان سفلي, also Romanized as Varmīān-e Soflá; also known as Varmīān and Varmīyān) is a village in Zangvan Rural District, Karezan District, Sirvan County, Ilam Province, Iran. At the 2006 census, its population was 169, in 34 families. The village is populated by Kurds.
