= Latab =

Latab لتاب
- Village
- Location within Iran
- Coordinates: 33°43′11″N 46°39′31″E
- Country: Iran
- Province: Ilam
- County: Chardavol
- Bakhsh: Shabab
- Rural District: Shabab

Population (2006)
  - Total: 386
- Time zone: UTC+3:30 (IRST)
  - Summer (DST): UTC+4:30 (IRDT)

Latab (Persian: لتاب, also Romanized as Latāb; also known as Latāb-e Soflá) is a village in Shabab Rural District, in the Shabab District of Chardavol County, Ilam Province, Iran. At the 2006 census, its population was 386, in 85 families. The village is populated by Kurds.
