= Rah Sefid =

Rah Sefid راه سفيد
- Village
- Location within Iran
- Coordinates: 33°42′14″N 46°17′33″E
- Country: Iran
- Province: Ilam
- County: Ilam
- Bakhsh: Chavar
- Rural District: Arkavazi

Population (2006)
  - Total: 181
- Time zone: UTC+3:30 (IRST)
  - Summer (DST): UTC+4:30 (IRDT)

Rah Sefid (Persian: راه سفيد, also Romanized as Rāh Sefīd) is a village in Arkavazi Rural District, Chavar District, Ilam County, Ilam Province, Iran. At the 2006 census, its population was 181, in 26 families. The village is populated by Kurds.
