= Shilab =

Shilab شيلاب
- Village
- Location within Iran
- Coordinates: 33°01′50″N 47°17′28″E
- Country: Iran
- Province: Ilam
- County: Abdanan
- Bakhsh: Central
- Rural District: Maspi

Population (2006)
  - Total: 59
- Time zone: UTC+3:30 (IRST)
  - Summer (DST): UTC+4:30 (IRDT)

Shilab (Persian: شيلاب, also Romanized as Shīlāb) is a village in Maspi Rural District, in the Central District of Abdanan County, Ilam Province, Iran. At the 2006 census, its population was 59, in 11 families. The village is populated by Kurds.
