= Zam Zaman =

Zam Zaman زمزمان
- Village
- Location within Iran
- Coordinates: 33°48′18″N 46°05′21″E
- Country: Iran
- Province: Ilam
- County: Ilam
- Bakhsh: Chavar
- Rural District: Arkavazi

Population (2006)
  - Total: 31
- Time zone: UTC+3:30 (IRST)
  - Summer (DST): UTC+4:30 (IRDT)

Zam Zaman (Persian: زمزمان, also Romanized as Zam Zamān) is a village in Arkavazi Rural District, Chavar District, Ilam County, Ilam Province, Iran. At the 2006 census, its population was 31, in 5 families. The village is populated by Kurds.
