= Ban Kalvali =

Ban Kalvali بان كل ولي
- Village
- Location within Iran
- Coordinates: 33°43′52″N 46°07′14″E
- Country: Iran
- Province: Ilam
- County: Ilam
- Bakhsh: Chavar
- Rural District: Arkavazi

Population (2006)
  - Total: 69
- Time zone: UTC+3:30 (IRST)
  - Summer (DST): UTC+4:30 (IRDT)

Ban Kalvali (Persian: بان كل ولي, also Romanized as Bān Kalvalī; also known as Kūh Khāleh) is a village in Arkavazi Rural District, Chavar District, Ilam County, Ilam Province, Iran. At the 2006 census, its population was 69, in 16 families. The village is populated by Kurds.
