= Shaleh Shuri =

Shaleh Shuri شاله شوري
- Village
- Location within Iran
- Coordinates: 33°53′44″N 46°11′45″E
- Country: Iran
- Province: Ilam
- County: Eyvan
- Bakhsh: Zarneh
- Rural District: Kalan

Population (2006)
  - Total: 102
- Time zone: UTC+3:30 (IRST)
  - Summer (DST): UTC+4:30 (IRDT)

Shaleh Shuri (Persian: شاله شوري, also Romanized as Shāleh Shūrī and Shāleh Showrī; also known as Baleh Shūrī) is a village in Kalan Rural District, Zarneh District, Eyvan County, Ilam Province, Iran. At the 2006 census, its population was 102, made up of 22 families. The village is populated by Kurds.
