= Balaveh Khoshkeh =

Balaveh Khoshkeh بلاوه خشكه
- Village
- Location within Iran
- Coordinates: 33°39′51″N 46°49′46″E
- Country: Iran
- Province: Ilam
- County: Chardavol
- Bakhsh: Zagros
- Rural District: Bijnavand

Population (2006)
  - Total: 316
- Time zone: UTC+3:30 (IRST)
  - Summer (DST): UTC+4:30 (IRDT)

Balaveh Khoshkeh (Persian: بلاوه خشكه, also Romanized as Balāveh Khoshkeh and Belāveh Khoshkeh) is a village in Bijnavand Rural District, in the Zagros District of Chardavol County, Ilam Province, Iran. At the 2006 census, its population was 316, in 62 families. The village is populated by Kurds.
