= Aliabad-e Bozorg =

Aliabad-e Bozorg علي ابادبزرگ
- Village
- Location within Iran
- Coordinates: 33°06′22″N 46°48′05″E
- Country: Iran
- Province: Ilam
- County: Dehloran
- Bakhsh: Zarrinabad
- Rural District: Seyyed Nasereddin

Population (2006)
  - Total: 145
- Time zone: UTC+3:30 (IRST)
  - Summer (DST): UTC+4:30 (IRDT)

Aliabad-e Bozorg (Persian: علي ابادبزرگ, also Romanized as ‘Alīābād-e Bozorg) is a village in Seyyed Nasereddin Rural District, Zarrinabad District, Dehloran County, Ilam Province, Iran. At the 2006 census, its population was 145, in 25 families. The village is populated by Kurds.
