= Haranmar =

Haranmar هرانمر
- Village
- Location within Iran
- Coordinates: 33°16′26″N 47°07′35″E
- Country: Iran
- Province: Ilam
- County: Darreh Shahr
- Bakhsh: Badreh
- Rural District: Hendmini

Population (2006)
  - Total: 127
- Time zone: UTC+3:30 (IRST)
  - Summer (DST): UTC+4:30 (IRDT)

Haranmar (Persian: هرانمر, also Romanized as Harānmar) is a village in Hendmini Rural District, Badreh District, Darreh Shahr County, Ilam Province, Iran. At the 2006 census, its population was 127, in 24 families. The village is populated by Lurs.
