= Sarpitak =

Sarpitak سرپتك
- Village
- Location within Iran
- Coordinates: 33°49′50″N 45°55′04″E
- Country: Iran
- Province: Ilam
- County: Ilam
- Bakhsh: Chavar
- Rural District: Boli

Population (2006)
  - Total: 32
- Time zone: UTC+3:30 (IRST)
  - Summer (DST): UTC+4:30 (IRDT)

Sarpitak (Persian: سرپتك, also Romanized as Sarpītak; also known as Sar Pītang) is a village in Boli Rural District, Chavar District, Ilam County, Ilam Province, Iran. At the 2006 census, its population was 32, in 7 families. The village is populated by Kurds.
