= Shahrak-e Dasht Akbar =

Shahrak-e Dasht Akbar شهرك دشت اكبر
- Village
- Country: Iran
- Province: Ilam
- County: Dehloran
- Bakhsh: Musian
- Rural District: Nahr-e Anbar

Population (2006)
  - Total: 164
- Time zone: UTC+3:30 (IRST)
  - Summer (DST): UTC+4:30 (IRDT)

Shahrak-e Dasht Akbar (Persian: شهرك دشت اكبر, also Romanized as Shahrak-e Dasht Ākbar) is a village in Nahr-e Anbar Rural District, Musian District, Dehloran County, Ilam Province, Iran. At the 2006 census, its population was 164, in 39 families. The village is populated by Arabs.
