= Sorurabad =

Sorurabad سروراباد
- Village
- Location within Iran
- Coordinates: 33°12′17″N 47°22′27″E
- Country: Iran
- Province: Ilam
- County: Darreh Shahr
- Bakhsh: Central
- Rural District: Zarrin Dasht

Population (2006)
  - Total: 230
- Time zone: UTC+3:30 (IRST)
  - Summer (DST): UTC+4:30 (IRDT)

Sorurabad (Persian: سروراباد, also Romanized as Sorūrābād) is a village in Zarrin Dasht Rural District, in the Central District of Darreh Shahr County, Ilam Province, Iran. At the 2006 census, its population was 230, in 52 families. The village is populated by Kurds.
