= Mian Dar Zarneh =

Mian Dar Zarneh مياندارزرنه
- Village
- Location within Iran
- Coordinates: 33°57′38″N 46°05′21″E
- Country: Iran
- Province: Ilam
- County: Eyvan
- Bakhsh: Zarneh
- Rural District: Zarneh

Population (2006)
  - Total: 33
- Time zone: UTC+3:30 (IRST)
  - Summer (DST): UTC+4:30 (IRDT)

Mian Dar Zarneh (Persian: مياندارزرنه, also Romanized as Mīān Dār Zarneh; also known as Mīān Dār) is a village in Zarneh Rural District, Zarneh District, Eyvan County, Ilam Province, Iran. At the 2006 census, its population was 33, in 6 families. The village is populated by Kurds.
