= Bardeh Bal =

Bardeh Bal برده بل
- Village
- Location within Iran
- Coordinates: 33°41′33″N 46°41′29″E
- Country: Iran
- Province: Ilam
- County: Chardavol
- Bakhsh: Shabab
- Rural District: Shabab

Population (2006)
  - Total: 304
- Time zone: UTC+3:30 (IRST)
  - Summer (DST): UTC+4:30 (IRDT)

Bardeh Bal (Persian: برده بل; also known as Bardbal) is a village in Shabab Rural District, in the Shabab District of Chardavol County, Ilam Province, Iran. At the 2006 census, its population was 304, in 64 families. The village is populated by Kurds.
