= Jub Shaleh =

Jub Shaleh جوب شله
- Village
- Location within Iran
- Coordinates: 33°37′07″N 46°49′23″E
- Country: Iran
- Province: Ilam
- County: Chardavol
- Bakhsh: Zagros
- Rural District: Bijnavand

Population (2006)
  - Total: 167
- Time zone: UTC+3:30 (IRST)
  - Summer (DST): UTC+4:30 (IRDT)

Jub Shaleh (Persian: جوب شله, also Romanized as Jūb Shaleh; also known as Chūb Shaleh) is a village in Bijnavand Rural District, in the Zagros District of Chardavol County, Ilam Province, Iran. At the 2006 census, its population was 167, in 35 families. The village is populated by Kurds.
