= Zeyd, Ilam =

Zeyd زيد
- Village
- Location within Iran
- Coordinates: 33°15′00″N 47°11′30″E
- Country: Iran
- Province: Ilam
- County: Darreh Shahr
- Bakhsh: Badreh
- Rural District: Hendmini

Population (2006)
  - Total: 643
- Time zone: UTC+3:30 (IRST)
  - Summer (DST): UTC+4:30 (IRDT)

Zeyd (Persian: زيد; also known as Zat) is a village in Hendmini Rural District, Badreh District, Darreh Shahr County, Ilam Province, Iran. At the 2006 census, its population was 643, in 101 families. The village is populated by Lurs.
