= Maleh Safarkhan Kheybar =

Maleh Safarkhan Kheybar مله صفرخان خيبر
- Village
- Country: Iran
- Province: Ilam
- County: Darreh Shahr
- Bakhsh: Badreh
- Rural District: Dustan

Population (2006)
  - Total: 82
- Time zone: UTC+3:30 (IRST)
  - Summer (DST): UTC+4:30 (IRDT)

Maleh Safarkhan Kheybar (Persian: مله صفرخان خيبر, also Romanized as Maleh S̱afarkhān Kheybar) is a village in Dustan Rural District, Badreh District, Darreh Shahr County, Ilam Province, Iran. At the 2006 census, its population was 82, in 13 families. The village is populated by Kurds.
