= Vari-ye Kalak =

Vari-ye Kalak ورئ كلك
- Village
- Location within Iran
- Coordinates: 33°22′59″N 46°28′13″E
- Country: Iran
- Province: Ilam
- County: Malekshahi
- Bakhsh: Gachi
- Rural District: Gachi

Population (2006)
  - Total: 744
- Time zone: UTC+3:30 (IRST)
  - Summer (DST): UTC+4:30 (IRDT)

Vari-ye Kalak (Persian: ورئ كلك, also Romanized as Varī-ye Kalak) is a village in Gachi Rural District, Gachi District, Malekshahi County, Ilam Province, Iran. At the 2006 census, its population was 744, in 100 families. The village is populated by Kurds.
