= Sarchamlu =

Sarchamlu سرچملو
- Village
- Location within Iran
- Coordinates: 33°47′48″N 46°00′41″E
- Country: Iran
- Province: Ilam
- County: Ilam
- Bakhsh: Chavar
- Rural District: Boli

Population (2006)
  - Total: 47
- Time zone: UTC+3:30 (IRST)
  - Summer (DST): UTC+4:30 (IRDT)

Sarchamlu (Persian: سرچملو, also romanized as Sarchamlū) is a village in Boli Rural District, Chavar District, Ilam County, Ilam Province, Iran. At the 2006 census, its population was 47, with 11 families. The village is populated by Kurds.
