= Chal Khoshk =

Chal Khoshk چال خشك
- Village
- Location within Iran
- Coordinates: 33°53′37″N 47°28′21″E
- Country: Iran
- Province: Ilam
- County: Chardavol
- Bakhsh: Helilan
- Rural District: Zardalan

Population (2006)
  - Total: 358
- Time zone: UTC+3:30 (IRST)
  - Summer (DST): UTC+4:30 (IRDT)

Chal Khoshk (Persian: چال خشك, also Romanized as Chāl Khoshk; ) is a village in Zardalan Rural District, Helilan District, Chardavol County, Ilam Province, Iran. At the 2006 census, its population was 358, in 75 families. The village is populated by Laks.
