= Shahrak-e Shahid Rajai, Ilam =

Shahrak-e Shahid Rajai بانحاجی )شهرك شهيدرجايي)
- Village
- Location within Iran
- Coordinates: 33°45′35″N 46°09′24″E
- Country: Iran
- Province: Ilam
- County: Ilam
- Bakhsh: Chavar
- Rural District: Arkavazi

Population (2006)
  - Total: 280
- Time zone: UTC+3:30 (IRST)
  - Summer (DST): UTC+4:30 (IRDT)

Shahrak-e Shahid Rajai (Persian: شهرك شهيدرجايي, also Romanized as Shahrak-e Shahīd Rajā’ī; also known as Cham-e Shāţer) is a village in Arkavazi Rural District, Chavar District, Ilam County, Ilam Province, Iran. At the 2006 census, its population was 280, in 80 families. The village is populated by Kurds.
