= Zeytun Timeh =

Zeytun Timeh زيتون تيمه
- Village
- Country: Iran
- Province: Ilam
- County: Dehloran
- Bakhsh: Zarrinabad
- Rural District: Seyyed Nasereddin

Population (2006)
  - Total: 48
- Time zone: UTC+3:30 (IRST)
  - Summer (DST): UTC+4:30 (IRDT)

Zeytun Timeh (Persian: زيتون تيمه, also Romanized as Zeytūn Tīmeh) is a village in Seyyed Nasereddin Rural District, Zarrinabad District, Dehloran County, Ilam Province, Iran. At the 2006 census, its population was 48, in 9 families. The village is populated by Kurds.
