= Varbar =

Village in Ilam, Iran

Varbar وربر
- Village
- Location within Iran
- Coordinates: 33°47′37″N 47°05′00″E
- Country: Iran
- Province: Ilam
- County: Chardavol
- Bakhsh: Helilan
- Rural District: Helilan

Population (2006)
  - Total: 109
- Time zone: UTC+3:30 (IRST)
  - Summer (DST): UTC+4:30 (IRDT)

Varbar (Persian: وربر; also known as Varbar-e Helīlān) is a village in Helilan Rural District, Helilan District, Chardavol County, Ilam Province, Iran. At the 2006 census, its population was 109, with 25 families. The village is populated by Kurds.
