= Sheykh Nowruz Shahrak-e Fath =

Sheykh Nowruz Shahrak-e Fath شيخ نوروز شهرك فتح
- Village
- Location within Iran
- Coordinates: 32°19′32″N 47°51′31″E
- Country: Iran
- Province: Ilam
- County: Dehloran
- Bakhsh: Musian
- Rural District: Dasht-e Abbas

Population (2006)
  - Total: 321
- Time zone: UTC+3:30 (IRST)
  - Summer (DST): UTC+4:30 (IRDT)

Sheykh Nowruz Shahrak-e Fath (Persian: شيخ نوروز شهرك فتح, also Romanized as Sheykh Nowrūz Shahrak-e Fatḩ; also known as Fatḩ) is a village in Dasht-e Abbas Rural District, Musian District, Dehloran County, Ilam Province, Iran. At the 2006 census, its population was 321, in 48 families.
