= Ban-e Sarv =

Ban-e Sarv بان سرو
- Village
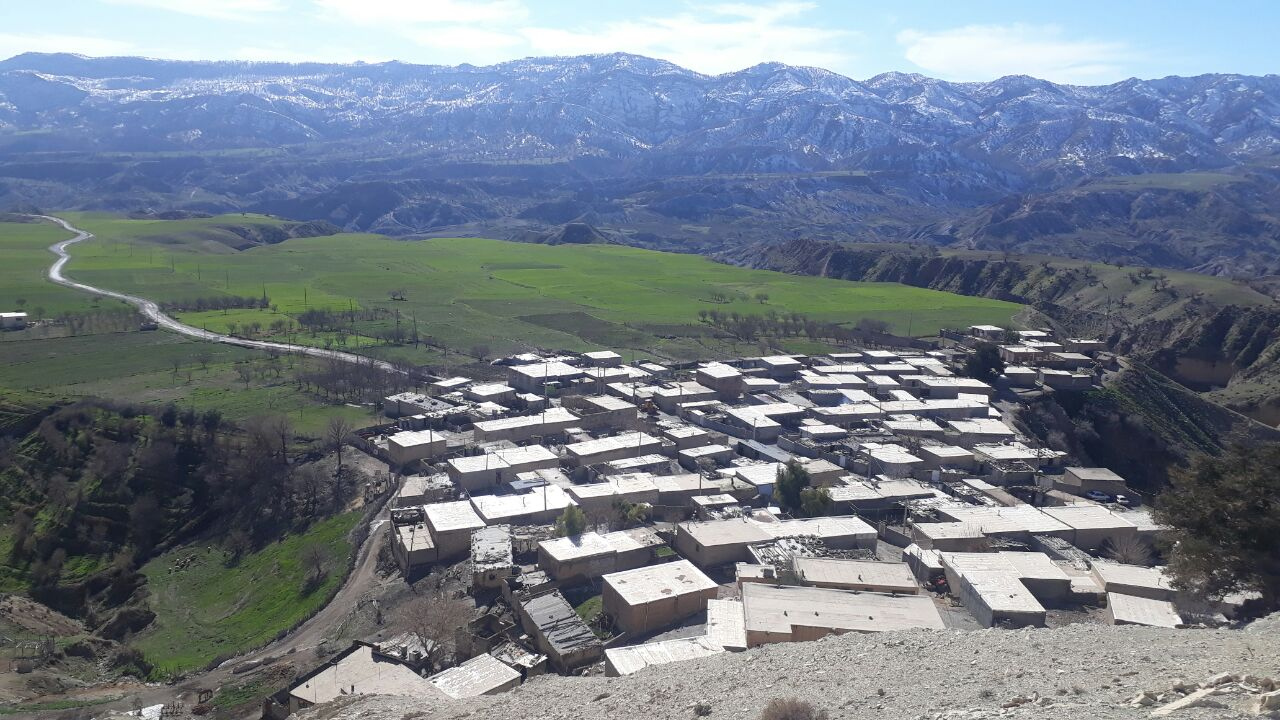
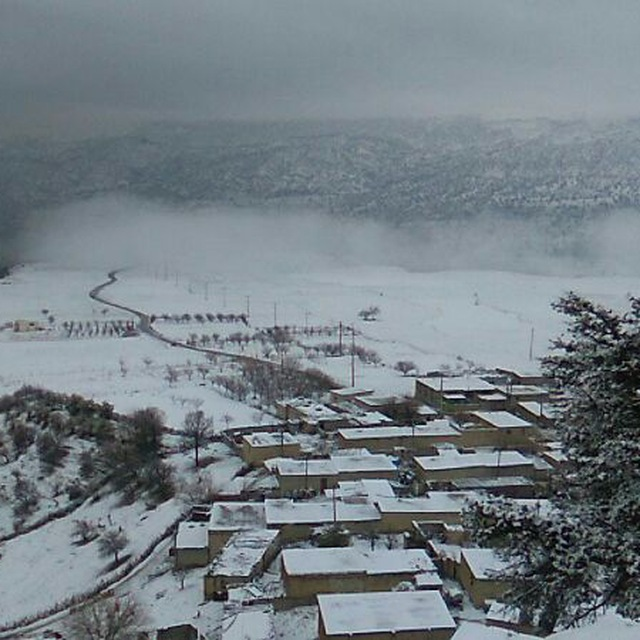

- Location within Iran
- Coordinates: 33°48′01″N 46°08′05″E
- Country: Iran
- Province: Ilam
- County: Ilam
- Bakhsh: Chavar
- Rural District: Arkavazi

Population (2006)
  - Total: 244
- Time zone: UTC+3:30 (IRST)
  - Summer (DST): UTC+4:30 (IRDT)

Ban-e Sarv (Persian: بان سرو, also Romanized as Bān-e Sarv and Bān Sarv; also known as Sarv Şūl) is a village in Arkavazi Rural District, Chavar District, Ilam County, Ilam Province, Iran. At the 2006 census, its population was 244, in 51 families. The village is populated by Kurds.
