= Sadaqet =

Sadaqet صداقت
- Village
- Country: Iran
- Province: Ilam
- County: Eyvan
- Bakhsh: Zarneh
- Rural District: Zarneh

Population (2006)
  - Total: 56
- Time zone: UTC+3:30 (IRST)
  - Summer (DST): UTC+4:30 (IRDT)

Sadaqet (Persian: صداقت, also Romanized as Şadāqet) is a village in Zarneh Rural District, Zarneh District, Eyvan County, Ilam Province, Iran. At the 2006 census, its population was 56, in 10 families. The village is populated by Kurds.
