= Bavalak =

Bavalak باولگ
- Village
- Location within Iran
- Coordinates: 33°24′59″N 46°37′40″E
- Country: Iran
- Province: Ilam
- County: Malekshahi
- Bakhsh: Gachi
- Rural District: Gachi

Population (2006)
  - Total: 1,795
- Time zone: UTC+3:30 (IRST)
  - Summer (DST): UTC+4:30 (IRDT)

Bavalak (Persian: باولگ, also Romanized as Bāvalak; also known as Bāāvalag) is a village in Gachi Rural District, Gachi District, Malekshahi County, Ilam Province, Iran. At the 2006 census, its population was 1,795, in 290 families. The village is populated by Kurds.
