= Kali Kali =

Kali Kali كلي كلي
- Village
- Location within Iran
- Coordinates: 33°42′01″N 46°33′41″E
- Country: Iran
- Province: Ilam
- County: Sirvan
- Bakhsh: Karezan
- Rural District: Karezan

Population (2006)
  - Total: 524
- Time zone: UTC+3:30 (IRST)
  - Summer (DST): UTC+4:30 (IRDT)

Kali Kali (Persian: كلي كلي, also Romanized as Kalī Kalī) is a village in Karezan Rural District, Karezan District, Sirvan County, Ilam Province, Iran. At the 2006 census, its population was 524, in 101 families. The village is populated by Kurds.
