= Palangabad, Ilam =

Palangabad پلنگ اباد
- Village
- Location within Iran
- Coordinates: 33°09′09″N 47°19′27″E
- Country: Iran
- Province: Ilam
- County: Darreh Shahr
- Bakhsh: Central
- Rural District: Zarrin Dasht

Population (2006)
  - Total: 189
- Time zone: UTC+3:30 (IRST)
  - Summer (DST): UTC+4:30 (IRDT)

Palangabad (Persian: پلنگ اباد, also Romanized as Palangābād; also known as Beheshtābād) is a village in Zarrin Dasht Rural District, in the Central District of Darreh Shahr County, Ilam Province, Iran. At the 2006 census, its population was 189, in 44 families. The village is populated by Kurds.
