= Cham Charud =

Village in Ilam, Iran

Cham Charud چمچرود
- Village
- Location within Iran
- Coordinates: 33°36′28″N 46°50′33″E
- Country: Iran
- Province: Ilam
- County: Chardavol
- Bakhsh: Zagros
- Rural District: Bijnavand

Population (2006)
  - Total: 184
- Time zone: UTC+3:30 (IRST)
  - Summer (DST): UTC+4:30 (IRDT)

Cham Charud (Persian: چمچرود, also Romanized as Cham Charūd; also known as Chamcharū) is a village in Bijnavand Rural District, in the Zagros District of Chardavol County, Ilam Province, Iran. At the 2006 census, its population was 184, in 44 families. The village is dominated by Kurds.
