= Banbur-e Farkhinvand =

Banbur-e Farkhinvand بانبور فرخينوند
- Village
- Country: Iran
- Province: Ilam
- County: Chardavol
- Bakhsh: Zagros
- Rural District: Bijnavand

Population (2006)
  - Total: 18
- Time zone: UTC+3:30 (IRST)
  - Summer (DST): UTC+4:30 (IRDT)

Banbur-e Farkhinvand (Persian: بانبور فرخينوند, also Romanized as Bānbūr-e Farkhīnvand) is a village in Bijnavand Rural District, in the Zagros District of Chardavol County, Ilam Province, Iran. At the 2006 census, its population was 18, in 4 families. The village is populated by Kurds.
