= Meydar-e Olya =

Meydar-e Olya ميدرعليا
- Village
- Location within Iran
- Coordinates: 33°55′02″N 47°29′33″E
- Country: Iran
- Province: Ilam
- County: Chardavol
- Bakhsh: Helilan
- Rural District: Zardalan

Population (2006)
  - Total: 302
- Time zone: UTC+3:30 (IRST)
  - Summer (DST): UTC+4:30 (IRDT)

Meydar-e Olya (Persian: ميدرعليا, as Meydar-e ‘Olyā) is a village in Zardalan Rural District, Helilan District, Chardavol County, Ilam Province, Iran. At the 2006 census, its population was 302, in 72 families. Laki is the primary language spoken by the residents of this village
