= Haft Kadeh =

Haft Kadeh هفتكده
- Village
- Location within Iran
- Coordinates: 33°03′49″N 46°54′10″E
- Country: Iran
- Province: Ilam
- County: Dehloran
- Bakhsh: Zarrinabad
- Rural District: Seyyed Nasereddin

Population (2006)
  - Total: 280
- Time zone: UTC+3:30 (IRST)
  - Summer (DST): UTC+4:30 (IRDT)

Haft Kadeh (Persian: هفتكده) is a village in Seyyed Nasereddin Rural District, Zarrinabad District, Dehloran County, Ilam Province, Iran. At the 2006 census, its population was 280, in 54 families. The village is populated by Kurds.
