= Galmeh =

Galmeh Persian: گلمه
- village
- Location within Iran
- Coordinates: 33°47′03″N 46°35′42″E
- Country: Iran
- Province: Ilam
- County: Chardavol
- Bakhsh: Shabab
- Rural District: Zanjireh

Population (2006)
  - Total: 307
- Time zone: UTC+3:30 (IRST)
  - Summer (DST): UTC+4:30 (IRDT)

Galmeh (Persian: گلمه, also Romanized as Galāmeh, Golameh, Golmeh, and Kalmeh) is a village in Zanjireh Rural District, in the Shabab District of Chardavol County, Ilam Province, Iran. At the 2006 census, its population was 307, in 53 families. The village is populated by Kurds.
