= Sareh Vian =

Sareh Vian سره ويان
- Village
- Country: Iran
- Province: Ilam
- County: Chardavol
- Bakhsh: Helilan
- Rural District: Zardalan

Population (2006)
  - Total: 76
- Time zone: UTC+3:30 (IRST)
  - Summer (DST): UTC+4:30 (IRDT)

Sareh Vian (Persian: سره ويان, also Romanized as Sareh Vīān) is a village in Zardalan Rural District, Helilan District, Chardavol County, Ilam Province, Iran. At the 2006 census, its population was 76, in 13 families. The village is populated by Kurds.
