= Dul-e Moniri =

Dul-e Moniri دول منيري
- Village
- Location within Iran
- Coordinates: 32°45′18″N 47°06′08″E
- Country: Iran
- Province: Ilam
- County: Dehloran
- Bakhsh: Central
- Rural District: Anaran

Population (2006)
  - Total: 43
- Time zone: UTC+3:30 (IRST)
  - Summer (DST): UTC+4:30 (IRDT)

Dul-e Moniri (Persian: دول منيري, also Romanized as Dūl-e Monīrī) is a village in Anaran Rural District, in the Central District of Dehloran County, Ilam Province, Iran. At the 2006 census, its population was 43, in 8 families. The village is populated by Lurs.
