= Sarcham-e Deh Harun =

Sarcham-e Deh Harun سرچم ده هارون
- Village
- Location within Iran
- Coordinates: 33°49′23″N 45°57′27″E
- Country: Iran
- Province: Ilam
- County: Ilam
- Bakhsh: Chavar
- Rural District: Boli

Population (2006)
  - Total: 102
- Time zone: UTC+3:30 (IRST)
  - Summer (DST): UTC+4:30 (IRDT)

Sarcham-e Deh Harun (Persian: سرچم ده هارون, also Romanized as Sarcham-e Deh Hārūn) is a village in Boli Rural District, Chavar District, Ilam County, Ilam Province, Iran. At the 2006 census, its population was 102, in 21 families. The village is populated by Kurds.
