= Dalpari =

Dalpari دال پري
- Village
- Location within Iran
- Coordinates: 32°29′16″N 47°33′22″E
- Country: Iran
- Province: Ilam
- County: Dehloran
- Bakhsh: Musian
- Rural District: Nahr-e Anbar

Population (2006)
  - Total: 28
- Time zone: UTC+3:30 (IRST)
  - Summer (DST): UTC+4:30 (IRDT)

Dalpari (Persian: دال پري, also Romanized as Dālparī) is a village in Nahr-e Anbar Rural District, Musian District, Dehloran County, Ilam Province, Iran. At the 2006 census, its population was 28, in 7 families.
