= Chaviz =

Chaviz چاويز
- Village
- Location within Iran
- Coordinates: 33°31′15″N 46°26′06″E
- Country: Iran
- Province: Ilam
- County: Ilam
- Bakhsh: Sivan
- Rural District: Mishkhas

Population (2006)
  - Total: 177
- Time zone: UTC+3:30 (IRST)
  - Summer (DST): UTC+4:30 (IRDT)

Chaviz (Persian: چاويز, also Romanized as Chāvīz) is a village in Mishkhas Rural District, in the Sivan District of Ilam County, Ilam Province, Iran. At the 2006 census, its population was 177, in 35 families. The village is populated by Kurds.
