= Posht Tang-e Sofla =

Village in Ilam, Iran

Posht Tang-e Sofla پشت تنگ سفلي
- Village
- Location within Iran
- Coordinates: 33°46′26″N 47°06′02″E
- Country: Iran
- Province: Ilam
- County: Chardavol
- Bakhsh: Helilan
- Rural District: Helilan

Population (2006)
  - Total: 255
- Time zone: UTC+3:30 (IRST)
  - Summer (DST): UTC+4:30 (IRDT)

Posht Tang-e Sofla (Persian: پشت تنگ سفلي, also Romanized as Posht Tang-e Soflá; also known as Lareh Vand, Poshteh Tang-e Soflá, and Posht Tang-e Lareh Vand) is a village in Helilan Rural District, Helilan District, Chardavol County, Ilam Province, Iran. At the 2006 census, its population was 255, in 55 families. The village is populated by Kurds.
