= Cheshmeh Meru =

Meru چشمه مرو
- Village
- Location within Iran
- Coordinates: 33°55′38″N 45°59′33″E
- Country: Iran
- Province: Ilam
- County: Eyvan
- Bakhsh: Zarneh
- Rural District: Zarneh

Population (2006)
  - Total: 25
- Time zone: UTC+3:30 (IRST)
  - Summer (DST): UTC+4:30 (IRDT)

Meru (Persian: چشمه مرو, also Romanized as Merū and Cheshmeh Mīrū) is a village in Zarneh Rural District, Zarneh District, Eyvan County, Ilam Province, Iran. At the 2006 census, its population was 25, in 6 families. The village is populated by Kurds.
