= Shahrak-e Kavar Toveh Taq =

Shahrak-e Kavar Toveh Taq شهرك كاورتوه طاق
- Village
- Location within Iran
- Coordinates: 32°55′08″N 46°48′26″E
- Country: Iran
- Province: Ilam
- County: Dehloran
- Bakhsh: Central
- Rural District: Anaran

Population (2006)
  - Total: 456
- Time zone: UTC+3:30 (IRST)
  - Summer (DST): UTC+4:30 (IRDT)

Shahrak-e Kavar Toveh Taq (Persian: شهرك كاورتوه طاق, also Romanized as Shahrak-e Kāvar Toveh Ţāq; also known as Kāvar Toveh Ţāq and Toveh Ţāq) is a village in Anaran Rural District, in the Central District of Dehloran County, Ilam Province, Iran. At the 2006 census, its population was 456, in 84 families. The village is populated by Lurs.
