= Ban-e Amrud =

Ban-e Amrud بان امرود
- Village
- Location within Iran
- Coordinates: 33°46′18″N 46°11′34″E
- Country: Iran
- Province: Ilam
- County: Ilam
- Bakhsh: Chavar
- Rural District: Arkavazi

Population (2006)
  - Total: 52
- Time zone: UTC+3:30 (IRST)
  - Summer (DST): UTC+4:30 (IRDT)

Ban-e Amrud (Persian: بان امرود, also Romanized as Bān Amrūd and Bān-e Amrūd) is a village in Arkavazi Rural District, Chavar District, Ilam County, Ilam Province, Iran. At the 2006 census, its population was 52, in 14 families. The village is populated by Kurds.
