= Shurabeh Khuran =

Shurabeh Khuran شورابه خوران
- Village
- Location within Iran
- Coordinates: 33°56′45″N 46°07′44″E
- Country: Iran
- Province: Ilam
- County: Eyvan
- Bakhsh: Zarneh
- Rural District: Zarneh

Population (2006)
  - Total: 265
- Time zone: UTC+3:30 (IRST)
  - Summer (DST): UTC+4:30 (IRDT)

Shurabeh Khuran (Persian: شورابه خوران, also Romanized as Shūrābeh Khūrān; also known as Shūrābeh Taran) is a village in Zarneh Rural District, Zarneh District, Eyvan County, Ilam Province, Iran. At the 2006 census, its population was 265, in 52 families. The village is populated by Kurds.
