= Mivaneh =

Mivaneh ميوانه
- Village
- Location within Iran
- Coordinates: 34°01′15″N 46°03′53″E
- Country: Iran
- Province: Ilam
- County: Eyvan
- Bakhsh: Zarneh
- Rural District: Zarneh

Population (2006)
  - Total: 48
- Time zone: UTC+3:30 (IRST)
  - Summer (DST): UTC+4:30 (IRDT)

Mivaneh (Persian: ميوانه, also Romanized as Mīvāneh) is a village in Zarneh Rural District, Zarneh District, Eyvan County, Ilam Province, Iran. At the 2006 census, its population was 48, in 10 families. The village is populated by Kurds.
