= Siah Gav =

Siah Gav سياه گاو
- Village
- Location within Iran
- Coordinates: 32°51′00″N 47°42′00″E
- Country: Iran
- Province: Ilam
- County: Abdanan
- Bakhsh: Sarab Bagh
- Rural District: Sarab Bagh

Population (2006)
  - Total: 113
- Time zone: UTC+3:30 (IRST)
  - Summer (DST): UTC+4:30 (IRDT)

Siah Gav (Persian: سياه گاو, also Romanized as Sīāh Gāv) is a village in Sarab Bagh Rural District, Sarab Bagh District, Abdanan County, Ilam Province, Iran. At the 2006 census, its population was 113, in 22 families. The village is populated by Lurs.
