= Khordeh Cheshmeh =

Khordeh Cheshmeh خرده چشمه
- Village
- Location within Iran
- Coordinates: 33°44′09″N 47°07′51″E
- Country: Iran
- Province: Ilam
- County: Chardavol
- Bakhsh: Helilan
- Rural District: Helilan

Population (2006)
  - Total: 556
- Time zone: UTC+3:30 (IRST)
  - Summer (DST): UTC+4:30 (IRDT)

Khordeh Cheshmeh (Persian: خرده چشمه; also known as Cheshmeh Khvordeh, Khūrdeh Cheshmeh, and Khvordeh Cheshmeh) is a village in Helilan Rural District, Helilan District, Chardavol County, Ilam Province, Iran. At the 2006 census, its population was 556, in 106 families. The village is populated by Kurds.
