= Kolang Bor =

Kolang Bor كلنگبر
- Village
- Location within Iran
- Coordinates: 33°37′05″N 46°48′51″E
- Country: Iran
- Province: Ilam
- County: Chardavol
- Bakhsh: Zagros District
- Rural District: Bijnavand

Population (2006)
  - Total: 302
- Time zone: UTC+3:30 (IRST)
  - Summer (DST): UTC+4:30 (IRDT)

Kolang Bor (Persian: كلنگبر) is a village in Bijnavand Rural District, in the Zagros District of Chardavol County, Ilam Province, Iran. At the 2006 census, its population was 302, in 66 families. The village is populated by Kurds.
