= Banhalan-e Bala =

Banhalan-e Bala بان هلان بالا
- Village
- Location within Iran
- Coordinates: 33°19′35″N 47°01′00″E
- Country: Iran
- Province: Ilam
- County: Darreh Shahr
- Bakhsh: Badreh
- Rural District: Dustan

Population (2006)
  - Total: 250
- Time zone: UTC+3:30 (IRST)
  - Summer (DST): UTC+4:30 (IRDT)

Banhalan-e Bala (Persian: بان هلان بالا, also Romanized as Bānhalān-e Bālā; also known as Bānhalān) is a village in Dustan Rural District, Badreh District, Darreh Shahr County, Ilam Province, Iran. At the 2006 census, its population was 250, in 47 families. The village is populated by Kurds.
