= Shahran, Ilam =

Shahran شاهران
- Village
- Location within Iran
- Coordinates: 33°54′04″N 47°26′52″E
- Country: Iran
- Province: Ilam
- County: Chardavol
- Bakhsh: Helilan
- Rural District: Zardalan

Population (2006)
  - Total: 90
- Time zone: UTC+3:30 (IRST)
  - Summer (DST): UTC+4:30 (IRDT)

Shahran (Persian: شاهران, also Romanized as Shāhrān; also known as Shārān and Shārān Zardalān) is a village in Zardalan Rural District, Helilan District, Chardavol County, Ilam Province, Iran. At the 2006 census, its population was 90, in 18 families. The village is populated by Kurds.
