= Eyn Khvosh =

Eyn Khvosh عين خوش
- Village
- Location within Iran
- Coordinates: 32°24′45″N 47°38′14″E
- Country: Iran
- Province: Ilam
- County: Dehloran
- Bakhsh: Musian
- Rural District: Dasht-e Abbas

Population (2006)
  - Total: 709
- Time zone: UTC+3:30 (IRST)
  - Summer (DST): UTC+4:30 (IRDT)

Eyn Khvosh (Persian: عين خوش, also Romanized as ‘Eyn Khvosh, ‘Eyn-e Khvosh, Eyn Khūsh, and ‘Eyn-e Khowsh; also known as Chashmeh Khush) is a village in Dasht-e Abbas Rural District, Musian District, Dehloran County, Ilam Province, Iran. At the 2006 census, its population was 709, in 118 families. The village is populated by Arabs.
