= Shirah Choqa-ye Chalanchi =

Shirah Choqa-ye Chalanchi شيره چقاچالانچي
- Village
- Location within Iran
- Coordinates: 33°49′13″N 46°16′52″E
- Country: Iran
- Province: Ilam
- County: Eyvan
- Bakhsh: Central
- Rural District: Sarab

Population (2006)
  - Total: 76
- Time zone: UTC+3:30 (IRST)
  - Summer (DST): UTC+4:30 (IRDT)

Shirah Choqa-ye Chalanchi (Persian: شيره چقاچالانچي, also Romanized as Shīrah Choqā-ye Chālānchī; also known as Shīrah Choqā) is a village in Sarab Rural District, in the Central District of Eyvan County, Ilam Province, Iran. At the 2006 census, its population was 76, in 17 families. The village is populated by Kurds.
