= Agreh Bid =

Agreh Bid اگره بيد
- Village
- Location within Iran
- Coordinates: 33°09′45″N 47°01′18″E
- Country: Iran
- Province: Ilam
- County: Dehloran
- Bakhsh: Zarrinabad
- Rural District: Seyyed Nasereddin

Population (2006)
  - Total: 68
- Time zone: UTC+3:30 (IRST)
  - Summer (DST): UTC+4:30 (IRDT)

Agreh Bid (Persian: اگره بيد, also Romanized as Āgreh Bīd; also known as Āgar Bīd, Agārī Seyyed, and Agrī Bīd) is a village in Seyyed Nasereddin Rural District, Zarrinabad District, Dehloran County, Ilam Province, Iran. At the 2006 census, its population was 68, in 14 families. The village is populated by Kurds.
