= Dul Zard-e Zirtang =

Dul Zard-e Zirtang دول زردزيرتنگ
- Village
- Location within Iran
- Coordinates: 33°38′19″N 46°55′56″E
- Country: Iran
- Province: Ilam
- County: Chardavol
- Bakhsh: Zagros
- Rural District: Bijnavand

Population (2006)
  - Total: 59
- Time zone: UTC+3:30 (IRST)
  - Summer (DST): UTC+4:30 (IRDT)

Dul Zard-e Zirtang (Persian: دول زردزيرتنگ, also Romanized as Dūl Zard-e Zīrtang; also known as Dūl-e Zard and Dūl Zard) is a village in Bijnavand Rural District, in the Zagros District of Chardavol County, Ilam Province, Iran. At the 2006 census, its population was 59, in 12 families. The village is populated by Kurds.
