= Shahrak-e Emam, Ilam =

Shahrak-e Emam شهرك امام
- Village
- Location within Iran
- Coordinates: 33°44′25″N 47°07′24″E
- Country: Iran
- Province: Ilam
- County: Chardavol
- Bakhsh: Helilan
- Rural District: Helilan

Population (2006)
  - Total: 442
- Time zone: UTC+3:30 (IRST)
  - Summer (DST): UTC+4:30 (IRDT)

Shahrak-e Emam (Persian: شهرك امام, also Romanized as Shahrak-e Emām) is a village in Helilan Rural District, Helilan District, Chardavol County, Ilam Province, Iran. At the 2006 census, its population was 442, in 95 families. The village is populated by Kurds.
