= Toveh Siyeh =

Toveh Siyeh توه سيه
- Village
- Country: Iran
- Province: Ilam
- County: Eyvan
- Bakhsh: Zarneh
- Rural District: Kalan

Population (2006)
  - Total: 13
- Time zone: UTC+3:30 (IRST)
  - Summer (DST): UTC+4:30 (IRDT)

Toveh Siyeh (Persian: توه سيه, also Romanized as Toveh Sīyeh) is a village in Kalan Rural District, Zarneh District, Eyvan County, Ilam Province, Iran. At the 2006 census, its population was 13, in 4 families. The village is populated by Kurds.
