= Jub Bur =

Village in Ilam, Iran

Jub Bur جوب بور
- Village
- Location within Iran
- Coordinates: 33°38′55″N 46°47′12″E
- Country: Iran
- Province: Ilam
- County: Chardavol
- Bakhsh: Zagros
- Rural District: Bijnavand

Population (2006)
  - Total: 151
- Time zone: UTC+3:30 (IRST)
  - Summer (DST): UTC+4:30 (IRDT)

Jub Bur (Persian: جوب بور, also Romanized as Jūb Būr, Jūb Bor, and Jūbūr) is a village in Bijnavand Rural District, in the Zagros District of Chardavol County, Ilam Province, Iran. At the 2006 census, its population was 151, in 33 families. The village is populated by Kurds.
