= Delfanabad =

Delfanabad دلفان اباد
- Village
- Location within Iran
- Coordinates: 33°11′39″N 47°23′28″E
- Country: Iran
- Province: Ilam
- County: Darreh Shahr
- Bakhsh: Central
- Rural District: Zarrin Dasht

Population (2006)
  - Total: 439
- Time zone: UTC+3:30 (IRST)
  - Summer (DST): UTC+4:30 (IRDT)

Delfanabad (Persian: دلفان اباد, also Romanized as Delfānābād) is a village in Zarrin Dasht Rural District, in the Central District of Darreh Shahr County, Ilam Province, Iran. As per the 2006 census, its population was 439, in 79 families. The village is populated by Kurds.
