= Ban Gonbad =

Ban Gonbad بان گنبد
- Village
- Location within Iran
- Coordinates: 32°51′00″N 47°30′00″E
- Country: Iran
- Province: Ilam
- County: Abdanan
- Bakhsh: Sarab Bagh
- Rural District: Cham Kabud

Population (2006)
  - Total: 41
- Time zone: UTC+3:30 (IRST)
  - Summer (DST): UTC+4:30 (IRDT)

Ban Gonbad (Persian: بان گنبد, also Romanized as Bān Gonbad) is a village in Cham Kabud Rural District, Sarab Bagh District, Abdanan County, Ilam Province, Iran. At the 2006 census, its population was 41, in 8 families. The village is populated by Kurds.
