= Qasemabad, Ilam =

Qasemabad قاسم اباد
- Village
- Location within Iran
- Coordinates: 33°40′54″N 46°43′17″E
- Country: Iran
- Province: Ilam
- County: Chardavol
- Bakhsh: Zagros
- Rural District: Bijnavand

Population (2006)
  - Total: 53
- Time zone: UTC+3:30 (IRST)
  - Summer (DST): UTC+4:30 (IRDT)

Qasemabad (Persian: قاسم اباد, also Romanized as Qāsemābād) is a village in Bijnavand Rural District, in the Zagros District of Chardavol County, Ilam Province, Iran. At the 2006 census, its population was 53, in 13 families. The village is populated by Kurds.
