= Maleh-e Shirkhan =

Maleh-e Shirkhan مله شيرخان
- Village
- Location within Iran
- Coordinates: 33°37′22″N 46°59′37″E
- Country: Iran
- Province: Ilam
- County: Chardavol
- Bakhsh: Zagros
- Rural District: Ghaleh

Population (2006)
  - Total: 41
- Time zone: UTC+3:30 (IRST)
  - Summer (DST): UTC+4:30 (IRDT)

Maleh-e Shirkhan (Persian: مله شيرخان, also romanized as Maleh-e Shīrkhān and Maleh Shīrkhān) is a village in Ghaleh Rural District, Zagros District, Chardavol County, Ilam Province, Iran. At the 2006 census, its population was 41 in nine families. The village is populated by Kurds.
