= Tang-e Qir =

Tang-e Qir تنگقير
- Village
- Location within Iran
- Coordinates: 33°46′00″N 46°40′00″E
- Country: Iran
- Province: Ilam
- County: Chardavol
- Bakhsh: Shabab
- Rural District: Shabab

Population (2006)
  - Total: 85
- Time zone: UTC+3:30 (IRST)
  - Summer (DST): UTC+4:30 (IRDT)

Tang-e Qir (Persian: تنگقير, also Romanized as Tang-e Qīr) is a village in Shabab Rural District, in the Shabab District of Chardavol County, Ilam Province, Iran. At the 2006 census, its population was 85, in 16 families. The village is populated by Kurds.
