= Zardaluabad =

Village in Ilam, Iran

Zardaluabad زردالواباد
- Village
- Location within Iran
- Coordinates: 33°32′32″N 46°34′18″E
- Country: Iran
- Province: Ilam
- County: Ilam
- Bakhsh: Sivan
- Rural District: Mishkhas

Population (2006)
  - Total: 256
- Time zone: UTC+3:30 (IRST)
  - Summer (DST): UTC+4:30 (IRDT)

Zardaluabad (Persian: زردالواباد, also romanized as Zardālūābād and Zard Ālūābād) is a village in Mishkhas Rural District, in the Sivan District of Ilam County, Ilam Province, Iran. At the 2006 census, its population was 256, in 51 families. The village is populated by Kurds.
