= Kamangaran =

Kamangaran کمان گران
- Village
- Location within Iran
- Coordinates: 33°32′55″N 46°47′10″E
- Country: Iran
- Province: Ilam
- County: Sirvan
- Bakhsh: Central
- Rural District: Rudbar

Population (2006)
  - Total: 52
- Time zone: UTC+3:30 (IRST)
  - Summer (DST): UTC+4:30 (IRDT)

Kamangaran (Persian: کمان گران, also Romanized as Kamāngarān) is a village in Rudbar Rural District, Central District, Sirvan County, Ilam Province, Iran. At the 2006 census, its population was 52, in 10 families. The village is populated by Kurds.
