= Kulkani =

Kulkani كولكني
- Village
- Country: Iran
- Province: Ilam
- County: Darreh Shahr
- Bakhsh: Majin
- Rural District: Kulkani

Population (2006)
  - Total: 29
- Time zone: UTC+3:30 (IRST)
  - Summer (DST): UTC+4:30 (IRDT)

Kulkani (Persian: كولكني, also Romanized as Kūlḵanī) is a village in Kulkani Rural District, Majin District, Darreh Shahr County, Ilam Province, Iran. At the 2006 census, its population was 29, in 5 families. The village is populated by Lurs.
