= Cheshmeh Barik =

Cheshmeh Barik چشمه باريك
- Village
- Location within Iran
- Coordinates: 33°21′03″N 46°32′16″E
- Country: Iran
- Province: Ilam
- County: Malekshahi
- Bakhsh: Gachi
- Rural District: Gachi

Population (2006)
  - Total: 164
- Time zone: UTC+3:30 (IRST)
  - Summer (DST): UTC+4:30 (IRDT)

Cheshmeh Barik Kurdish as Kyani Wáyerr (Persian: چشمه باريك, also Romanized as Cheshmeh Bārīk) is a village in Gachi Rural District, Gachi District, Malekshahi County, Ilam Province, Iran. At the 2006 census, its population was 164, in 32 families. The village is populated by Kurds.
