= Cham Zhab =

Cham Zhab چم ژاب
- Village
- Location within Iran
- Coordinates: 33°08′42″N 47°27′06″E
- Country: Iran
- Province: Ilam
- County: Darreh Shahr
- Bakhsh: Central
- Rural District: Aramu

Population (2006)
  - Total: 857
- Time zone: UTC+3:30 (IRST)
  - Summer (DST): UTC+4:30 (IRDT)

Cham Zhab (Persian: چم ژاب, also Romanized as Cham Zhāb) is a village in Aramu Rural District, in the Central District of Darreh Shahr County, Ilam Province, Iran. At the 2006 census, its population was 857, in 170 families. The village is populated by Kurds.
