= Siah Siah, Ilam =

Siah Siah سياه سياه
- Village
- Location within Iran
- Coordinates: 33°31′29″N 46°50′11″E
- Country: Iran
- Province: Ilam
- County: Sirvan
- Bakhsh: Central
- Rural District: Rudbar

Population (2006)
  - Total: 96
- Time zone: UTC+3:30 (IRST)
  - Summer (DST): UTC+4:30 (IRDT)

Siah Siah (Persian: سياه سياه, also Romanized as Sīāh Sīāh) is a village in Rudbar Rural District, Central District, Sirvan County, Ilam Province, Iran. At the 2006 census, its population was 96, in 21 families. The village is populated by Kurds.
