= Chitlan =

Chitlan چيتلان
- Village
- Country: Iran
- Province: Ilam
- County: Chardavol
- Bakhsh: Shabab
- Rural District: Zanjireh

Population (2006)
  - Total: 116
- Time zone: UTC+3:30 (IRST)
  - Summer (DST): UTC+4:30 (IRDT)

Chitlan (Persian: چيتلان, also Romanized as Chītlān) is a village in Zanjireh Rural District, in the Shabab District of Chardavol County, Ilam Province, Iran. At the 2006 census, its population was 116, in 24 families. The village is populated by Kurds.
