= Shur Mahi =

Coordinates: 32.5746°N 47.2543°E

Shur Mahi شور ماهي
- Village
- Interactive map of Shur Mahi
- Country: Iran
- Province: Ilam
- County: Dehloran
- Bakhsh: Central
- Rural District: Anaran

Population (2006)
  - Total: 98
- Time zone: UTC+3:30 (IRST)
  - Summer (DST): UTC+4:30 (IRDT)

Shur Mahi (Persian: شور ماهي, also Romanized as Shūr Māhī) is a village in Anaran Rural District, in the Central District of Dehloran County, Ilam Province, Iran. At the 2006 census, its population was 98, in 18 families. The village is populated by Lurs.
