= Cham Quleh =

Coordinates: 33.6978°N 46.6647°E

Cham Quleh چمقوله
- Village
- Interactive map of Cham Quleh
- Country: Iran
- Province: Ilam
- County: Chardavol
- Bakhsh: Shabab
- Rural District: Shabab

Population (2006)
  - Total: 287
- Time zone: UTC+3:30 (IRST)
  - Summer (DST): UTC+4:30 (IRDT)

Cham Quleh (Persian: چمقوله, also Romanized as Cham Qūleh) is a village in Shabab Rural District, in Shabab District of Chardavol County, Ilam Province, Iran. At the 2006 census, its population was 287, in 58 families. The village is populated by Kurds.
