= Cheshmeh Davi =

Cheshmeh Davi چشمه داوي
- Village
- Location within Iran
- Coordinates: 33°33′33″N 46°28′23″E
- Country: Iran
- Province: Ilam
- County: Ilam
- Bakhsh: Sivan
- Rural District: Mishkhas

Population (2006)
  - Total: 71
- Time zone: UTC+3:30 (IRST)
  - Summer (DST): UTC+4:30 (IRDT)

Cheshmeh Davi (Persian: چشمه داوي, also Romanized as Cheshmeh Dāvī) is a village in Mishkhas Rural District, in the Sivan District of Ilam County, Ilam Province, Iran. At the 2006 census, its population was 71, in 13 families. The village is populated by Kurds.
