= Shahrak-e Qirab =

Shahrak-e Qirab شهرك قيراب
- Village
- Location within Iran
- Coordinates: 32°47′02″N 47°02′34″E
- Country: Iran
- Province: Ilam
- County: Dehloran
- Bakhsh: Central
- Rural District: Anaran

Population (2006)
  - Total: 83
- Time zone: UTC+3:30 (IRST)
  - Summer (DST): UTC+4:30 (IRDT)

Shahrak-e Qirab (Persian: شهرك قيراب, also Romanized as Shahrak-e Qīrāb; also known as Qīrāb) is a village in Anaran Rural District, in the Central District of Dehloran County, Ilam Province, Iran. At the 2006 census, its population was 83, in 14 families. The village is populated by Lurs.
