= Tom Tomu =

Tom Tomu تم تمو
- Village
- Location within Iran
- Coordinates: 32°44′29″N 47°11′34″E
- Country: Iran
- Province: Ilam
- County: Dehloran
- Bakhsh: Central
- Rural District: Anaran

Population (2006)
  - Total: 354
- Time zone: UTC+3:30 (IRST)
  - Summer (DST): UTC+4:30 (IRDT)

Tom Tomu (Persian: تم تمو, also Romanized as Tom Tomū and Tam Tamū) is a village in Anaran Rural District, in the Central District of Dehloran County, Ilam Province, Iran. At the 2006 census, its population was 354, in 77 families. The village is populated by Kurds.
