= Pacham-e Deh Harun =

Pacham-e Deh Harun پاچم ده هارون
- Village
- Location within Iran
- Coordinates: 33°48′07″N 45°57′40″E
- Country: Iran
- Province: Ilam
- County: Ilam
- Bakhsh: Chavar
- Rural District: Boli

Population (2006)
  - Total: 183
- Time zone: UTC+3:30 (IRST)
  - Summer (DST): UTC+4:30 (IRDT)

Pacham-e Deh Harun (Persian: پاچم ده هارون, also Romanized as Pācham-e Deh Hārūn; also known as Deh-e Hārūn) is a village in Boli Rural District, Chavar District, Ilam County, Ilam Province, Iran. At the 2006 census, its population was 183, in 43 families. The village is populated by Kurds.
