= Galuzeh Mashhad =

Galuzeh Mashhad گلوزه مشهد
- Village
- Location within Iran
- Coordinates: 33°00′50″N 46°53′38″E
- Country: Iran
- Province: Ilam
- County: Dehloran
- Bakhsh: Zarrinabad
- Rural District: Seyyed Nasereddin

Population (2006)
  - Total: 324
- Time zone: UTC+3:30 (IRST)
  - Summer (DST): UTC+4:30 (IRDT)

Galuzeh Mashhad (Persian: گلوزه مشهد, also Romanized as Galūzeh Mashhad; also known as Galūzeh and Galūzeh Pahl) is a village in Seyyed Nasereddin Rural District, Zarrinabad District, Dehloran County, Ilam Province, Iran. At the 2006 census, its population was 324, in 66 families. The village is populated by Kurds.
