= Abzar =

Abzar ابزار
- Village
- Location within Iran
- Coordinates: 33°29′08″N 46°52′42″E
- Country: Iran
- Province: Ilam
- County: Sirvan
- Bakhsh: Central
- Rural District: Rudbar

Population (2006)
  - Total: 96
- Time zone: UTC+3:30 (IRST)
  - Summer (DST): UTC+4:30 (IRDT)

Abzar (Persian: ابزار, also Romanized as Ābzār) is a village in Rudar Rural District, Central District, Sirvan County, Ilam Province, Iran. At the 2006 census, its population was 96, in 16 families. The village is populated by Kurds.
