= Babagir =

Babagir باباگير
- Village
- Location within Iran
- Coordinates: 34°00′24″N 46°05′29″E
- Country: Iran
- Province: Ilam
- County: Eyvan
- Bakhsh: Zarneh
- Rural District: Zarneh

Population (2006)
  - Total: 195
- Time zone: UTC+3:30 (IRST)
  - Summer (DST): UTC+4:30 (IRDT)

Babagir (Persian: باباگير, also Romanized as Bābāgīr) is a village in Zarneh Rural District, Zarneh District, Eyvan County, Ilam Province, Iran. At the 2006 census, its population was 195, in 46 families. The village is populated by Kurds.
