= Zahervand-e Sofla =

Zahervand-e Sofla ظاهروندسفلي
- Village
- Location within Iran
- Coordinates: 33°44′20″N 46°57′51″E
- Country: Iran
- Province: Ilam
- County: Chardavol
- Bakhsh: Helilan
- Rural District: Helilan

Population (2006)
  - Total: 241
- Time zone: UTC+3:30 (IRST)
  - Summer (DST): UTC+4:30 (IRDT)

Zahervand-e Sofla (Persian: ظاهروندسفلي, also Romanized as Z̧āhervand-e Soflá; also known as Z̧āhervand, Zāre‘vand-e Pā’īn, and Zāre‘vand-e Soflá) is a village in Helilan Rural District, Helilan District, Chardavol County, Ilam Province, Iran. At the 2006 census, its population was 241, in 49 families. The village is populated by Kurds.
