= Banzerkah =

Banzerkah بان زركه
- Village
- Location within Iran
- Coordinates: 33°00′00″N 47°41′48″E
- Country: Iran
- Province: Ilam
- County: Darreh Shahr
- Bakhsh: Majin
- Rural District: Kulkani

Population (2006)
  - Total: 180
- Time zone: UTC+3:30 (IRST)
  - Summer (DST): UTC+4:30 (IRDT)

Banzerkah (Persian: بان زركه, also Romanized as Bānzerkah and Bānzergah) is a village in Kulkani Rural District, Majin District, Darreh Shahr County, Ilam Province, Iran. At the 2006 census, its population was 180, in 35 families. The village is populated by Lurs.
