= Garazan-e Pain =

Garazan-e Pain گرازان پايين
- Village
- Country: Iran
- Province: Ilam
- County: Abdanan
- Bakhsh: Central
- Rural District: Maspi

Population (2006)
  - Total: 227
- Time zone: UTC+3:30 (IRST)
  - Summer (DST): UTC+4:30 (IRDT)

Garazan-e Pain (Persian: گرازان پايين, also Romanized as Garāzān-e Pā’īn) is a village in Maspi Rural District, in the Central District of Abdanan County, Ilam Province, Iran. At the 2006 census, its population was 227, in 42 families.
