= Kalleh-ye Garaz =

Kalleh-ye Garaz كله گراز
- Village
- Country: Iran
- Province: Ilam
- County: Abdanan
- Bakhsh: Central
- Rural District: Maspi

Population (2006)
  - Total: 70
- Time zone: UTC+3:30 (IRST)
  - Summer (DST): UTC+4:30 (IRDT)

Kalleh-ye Garaz (Persian: كله گراز, also Romanized as Kalleh-ye Garāz) is a village in Maspi Rural District, in the Central District of Abdanan County, Ilam Province, Iran. At the 2006 census, its population was 70, in 13 families. The village is populated by Kurds.
