= Rizehvand =

Rizehvand ريزه وند
- Village
- Location within Iran
- Coordinates: 33°46′47″N 46°01′40″E
- Country: Iran
- Province: Ilam
- County: Ilam
- Bakhsh: Chavar
- Rural District: Boli

Population (2006)
  - Total: 16
- Time zone: UTC+3:30 (IRST)
  - Summer (DST): UTC+4:30 (IRDT)

Rizehvand (Persian: ريزه وند, also Romanized as Rīzehvand; also known as Rīzehvand-e Būlī) is a village in Boli Rural District, Chavar District, Ilam County, Ilam Province, Iran. At the 2006 census, its population was 16, in 6 families. The village is populated by Kurds.
