= Shan Kabud =

Shan Kabud شان كبود
- Village
- Location within Iran
- Coordinates: 33°33′56″N 46°27′55″E
- Country: Iran
- Province: Ilam
- County: Ilam
- Bakhsh: Sivan
- Rural District: Mishkhas

Population (2006)
  - Total: 136
- Time zone: UTC+3:30 (IRST)
  - Summer (DST): UTC+4:30 (IRDT)

Shan Kabud (Persian: شان كبود, also Romanized as Shān Kabūd) is a village in Mishkhas Rural District, in the Sivan District of Ilam County, Ilam Province, Iran. At the 2006 census, its population was 136, in 25 families. The village is populated by Kurds.
