= Hajji Hazer =

Hajji Hazer حاجي حاضر
- Village
- Location within Iran
- Coordinates: 33°54′20″N 46°12′50″E
- Country: Iran
- Province: Ilam
- County: Eyvan
- Bakhsh: Zarneh
- Rural District: Kalan

Population (2006)
  - Total: 49
- Time zone: UTC+3:30 (IRST)
  - Summer (DST): UTC+4:30 (IRDT)

Hajji Hazer (Persian: حاجي حاضر, also Romanized as Ḩājjī Ḩāẕer; also known as Ḩājī Āzar, Ḩājjī Āzar, Mazār-e Ḩājjī Bābā Ḩāzer, Mazār-e Ḩajjī Hazār, Mazār Hāji Hazār, and Mazār Ḩājjī Hazār) is a village in Kalan Rural District, Zarneh District, Eyvan County, Ilam Province, Iran. At the 2006 census, its population was 49, in 11 families. The village is populated by Kurds.
