= Sireh Kaneh =

Sireh Kaneh سيره كانه
- Village
- Country: Iran
- Province: Ilam
- County: Chardavol
- Bakhsh: Helilan
- Rural District: Zardalan

Population (2006)
  - Total: 66
- Time zone: UTC+3:30 (IRST)
  - Summer (DST): UTC+4:30 (IRDT)

Sireh Kaneh (Persian: سيره كانه, also Romanized as Sīreh Kāneh) is a village in Zardalan Rural District, Helilan District, Chardavol County, Ilam Province, Iran. At the 2006 census, its population was 66, in 12 families. The village is populated by Kurds.
