= Changiyeh-ye Qajar =

Changiyeh-ye Qajar چنگيه قجر
- Village
- Location within Iran
- Coordinates: 33°34′09″N 46°29′41″E
- Country: Iran
- Province: Ilam
- County: Ilam
- Bakhsh: Sivan
- Rural District: Mishkhas

Population (2006)
  - Total: 321
- Time zone: UTC+3:30 (IRST)
  - Summer (DST): UTC+4:30 (IRDT)

Changiyeh-ye Qajar (Persian: چنگيه قجر, also Romanized as Changīyeh-ye Qajar; also known as Changīyeh, Changīyeh Gāvdārī, and Gāvdārī-ye Changīyeh) is a village in Mishkhas Rural District, in the Sivan District of Ilam County, Ilam Province, Iran. At the 2006 census, its population was 321, in 73 families. The village is populated by Kurds.
