= Nesar-e Chalab Zard =

Nesar-e Chalab Zard نسارچالاب زرد
- Village
- Location within Iran
- Coordinates: 33°37′55″N 46°51′08″E
- Country: Iran
- Province: Ilam
- County: Chardavol
- Bakhsh: Zagros
- Rural District: Bijnavand

Population (2006)
  - Total: 151
- Time zone: UTC+3:30 (IRST)
  - Summer (DST): UTC+4:30 (IRDT)

Nesar-e Chalab Zard (Persian: نسارچالاب زرد, also Romanized as Nesār-e Chālāb Zard and Neşār-e Chālāb Zard) is a village in Bijnavand Rural District, in the Zagros District of Chardavol County, Ilam Province, Iran. At the 2006 census, its population was 151, in 35 families. The village is populated by Kurds.
