= Gach Kuban =

Gach Kuban گچ كوبان
- Village
- Location within Iran
- Coordinates: 33°17′46″N 47°06′06″E
- Country: Iran
- Province: Ilam
- County: Darreh Shahr
- Bakhsh: Badreh
- Rural District: Hendmini

Population (2006)
  - Total: 877
- Time zone: UTC+3:30 (IRST)
  - Summer (DST): UTC+4:30 (IRDT)

Gach Kuban (Persian: گچ كوبان, also Romanized as Gach Kūbān; also known as Gachkūpān) is a village in Hendmini Rural District, Badreh District, Darreh Shahr County, Ilam Province, Iran. At the 2006 census, its population was 877, in 174 families. The village is populated by Lurs.
