= Lashekan =

Lashekan لاشكن
- Village
- Location within Iran
- Coordinates: 33°42′22″N 46°18′03″E
- Country: Iran
- Province: Ilam
- County: Ilam
- Bakhsh: Chavar
- Rural District: Arkavazi

Population (2006)
  - Total: 245
- Time zone: UTC+3:30 (IRST)
  - Summer (DST): UTC+4:30 (IRDT)

Lashekan (Persian: لاشكن, also Romanized as Lāshekan) is a village in Arkavazi Rural District, Chavar District, Ilam County, Ilam Province, Iran. At the 2006 census, its population was 245, in 49 families. The village is populated by Kurds.
