= Turem =

Turem تورم
- Village
- Location within Iran
- Coordinates: 33°45′08″N 47°24′49″E
- Country: Iran
- Province: Ilam
- County: Chardavol
- Bakhsh: Helilan
- Rural District: Zardalan

Population (2006)
  - Total: 22
- Time zone: UTC+3:30 (IRST)
  - Summer (DST): UTC+4:30 (IRDT)

Turem (Persian: تورم, also Romanized as Tūrem) is a village in Zardalan Rural District, Helilan District, Chardavol County, Ilam Province, Iran. At the 2006 census, its population was 22, in 5 families. The village is populated by Kurds.
