= Shahrak-e Motarefeh =

Village in Dehloran County, Iran

Shahrak-e Motarefeh شهرك مطارفه
- Village
- Location within Iran
- Coordinates: 32°23′59″N 47°45′16″E
- Country: Iran
- Province: Ilam
- County: Dehloran
- Bakhsh: Musian
- Rural District: Dasht-e Abbas

Population (2006)
  - Total: 72
- Time zone: UTC+3:30 (IRST)
  - Summer (DST): UTC+4:30 (IRDT)

Shahrak-e Motarefeh (Persian: شهرك مطارفه, also Romanized as Shahrak-e Moţārefeh; also known as Moţārefeh) is a village in Dasht-e Abbas Rural District, Musian District, Dehloran County, Ilam Province, Iran. At the 2006 census, its population was 72, in 12 families. The village is populated by Arabs.
