= Jurab Deraz Mirza Beygi =

juob Deraz & Mirza Beygi جوبدراز و ميرزابيگي
- Village
- Location within Iran
- Coordinates: 33°43′07″N 46°32′45″E
- Country: Iran
- Province: Ilam
- County: Sirvan
- Bakhsh: Karezan
- Rural District: Karezan

Population (2006)
  - Total: 666
- Time zone: UTC+3:30 (IRST)
  - Summer (DST): UTC+4:30 (IRDT)

Juob Deraz & Mirza Beygi (Persian: جوب‌دراز و ميرزابيگي, also Romanized as Jūob Derāz & Mīrzā Beygī; also known as jubderāz va Mīrzābeygī, Jūb Derāz & Mīrzā Beygī, and Joub Derāz & Mīrzā Beygī) is a village in Karezan Rural District, Karezan District, Sirvan County, Ilam Province, Iran. At the 2006 census, its population was 666, in 133 families. The village is populated by Kurds.
