= Cham Zhiyeh =

Cham Zhiyeh چم ژيه
- Village
- Location within Iran
- Coordinates: 33°41′07″N 46°07′44″E
- Country: Iran
- Province: Ilam
- County: Ilam
- Bakhsh: Chavar
- Rural District: Arkavazi

Population (2006)
  - Total: 75
- Time zone: UTC+3:30 (IRST)
  - Summer (DST): UTC+4:30 (IRDT)

Cham Zhiyeh (Persian: چم ژيه, also Romanized as Cham Zhīyeh; also known as Chamzheh) is a village in Arkavazi Rural District, Chavar District, Ilam County, Ilam Province, Iran. At the 2006 census, its population was 75, in 13 families. The village is populated by Kurds.
