= Panzdah-e Khordad =

Panzdah-e Khordad پانزده خرداد
- Village
- Location within Iran
- Coordinates: 33°34′00″N 46°46′00″E
- Country: Iran
- Province: Ilam
- County: Sirvan
- Bakhsh: Central
- Rural District: Lumar

Population (2006)
  - Total: 178
- Time zone: UTC+3:30 (IRST)
  - Summer (DST): UTC+4:30 (IRDT)

Panzdah-e Khordad (Persian: پانزده خرداد, also Romanized as Pānzdah-e Khordād) is a village in Lumar Rural District, Central District, Sirvan County, Ilam Province, Iran. At the 2006 census, its population was 178, in 33 families. The village is populated by Kurds.
