= Sadat Dalpari =

Sadat Dalpari سادات دالپري
- Village
- Location within Iran
- Coordinates: 32°38′59″N 47°32′39″E
- Country: Iran
- Province: Ilam
- County: Dehloran
- Bakhsh: Musian
- Rural District: Nahr-e Anbar

Population (2006)
  - Total: 390
- Time zone: UTC+3:30 (IRST)
  - Summer (DST): UTC+4:30 (IRDT)

Sadat Dalpari (Persian: سادات دالپري, also Romanized as Sādāt Dālparī; also known as Dālparī, Dāl Parī, and Seyyed Yūsefī) is a village in Nahr-e Anbar Rural District, Musian District, Dehloran County, Ilam Province, Iran. At the 2006 census, its population was 390, in 60 families. The village is populated by Arabs.
