= Varhal Cheshmeh Ramezan =

Varhal Cheshmeh Ramezan ورهال چشمه رمضان
- Village
- Location within Iran
- Coordinates: 33°47′42″N 45°56′57″E
- Country: Iran
- Province: Ilam
- County: Ilam
- Bakhsh: Chavar
- Rural District: Boli

Population (2006)
  - Total: 82
- Time zone: UTC+3:30 (IRST)
  - Summer (DST): UTC+4:30 (IRDT)

Varhal Cheshmeh Ramezan (Persian: ورهال چشمه رمضان, also Romanized as Varhāl Cheshmeh Rameẕān; also known as Cheshmeh Ramezān and Cheshmeh Rameẕān) is a village in Boli Rural District, Chavar District, Ilam County, Ilam Province, Iran. At the 2006 census, its population was 82, in 18 families. The village is populated by Kurds.
