= Cham Hendi =

Cham Hendi چم هندي
- Village
- Location within Iran
- Coordinates: 32°18′54″N 47°35′59″E
- Country: Iran
- Province: Ilam
- County: Dehloran
- Bakhsh: Musian
- Rural District: Abu Ghoveyr

Population (2006)
  - Total: 142
- Time zone: UTC+3:30 (IRST)
  - Summer (DST): UTC+4:30 (IRDT)

Cham Hendi (Persian: چم هندي, also Romanized as Cham Hendī and Cham-e Hendī; also known as Cham-e Hend) is a village in Abu Ghoveyr Rural District, Musian District, Dehloran County, Ilam Province, Iran. At the 2006 census, its population was 142, in 17 families.
