= Vargar =

Vargar ورگر
- Village
- Location within Iran
- Coordinates: 32°59′23″N 47°20′04″E
- Country: Iran
- Province: Ilam
- County: Abdanan
- Bakhsh: Central
- Rural District: Jaber-e Ansar

Population (2006)
  - Total: 45
- Time zone: UTC+3:30 (IRST)
  - Summer (DST): UTC+4:30 (IRDT)

Vargar (Persian: ورگر) is a village in Jaber-e Ansar Rural District, in the Central District of Abdanan County, Ilam Province, Iran. At the 2006 census, its population was 45, in 13 families.
