= Beyt-e Fazieh =

Beyt-e Fazieh بيت فزيه
- Village
- Country: Iran
- Province: Ilam
- County: Dehloran
- Bakhsh: Musian
- Rural District: Dasht-e Abbas

Population (2006)
  - Total: 114
- Time zone: UTC+3:30 (IRST)
  - Summer (DST): UTC+4:30 (IRDT)

Beyt-e Fazieh (Persian: بيت فزيه, also Romanized as Beyt-e Fazīeh) is a village in Dasht-e Abbas Rural District, Musian District, Dehloran County, Ilam Province, Iran. At the 2006 census, its population was 114, in 21 families. The village is populated by Arabs.
