= Gatareh =

Gatareh گتاره
- Village
- Location within Iran
- Coordinates: 32°27′36″N 47°48′00″E
- Country: Iran
- Province: Ilam
- County: Dehloran
- Bakhsh: Musian
- Rural District: Dasht-e Abbas

Population (2006)
  - Total: 513
- Time zone: UTC+3:30 (IRST)
  - Summer (DST): UTC+4:30 (IRDT)

Gatareh (Persian: گتاره, also Romanized as Gatāreh; also known as Shahrak-e S̱ārāllah) is a village in Dasht-e Abbas Rural District, Musian District, Dehloran County, Ilam Province, Iran. At the 2006 census, its population was 513, in 77 families. Cheshme Gatareh or Ktar from Musian and Dehlran districts was the residence of Amr Ali Gatar from Zayd Ali Biranvand clan. Due to the tension he had with the (Qajar) government at the time, he separated from his tribe and settled there (that's why this area was called Gatarah or Katar ). He leaves the area and moves to Horo
