= Posht-e Aresht =

Posht-e Aresht پشت ارشت
- Village
- Location within Iran
- Coordinates: 33°18′28″N 46°57′23″E
- Country: Iran
- Province: Ilam
- County: Darreh Shahr
- Bakhsh: Badreh
- Rural District: Dustan

Population (2006)
  - Total: 23
- Time zone: UTC+3:30 (IRST)
  - Summer (DST): UTC+4:30 (IRDT)

Posht-e Aresht (Persian: پشت ارشت; also known as Poshteh Arīsht) is a village in Dustan Rural District, Badreh District, Darreh Shahr County, Ilam Province, Iran. At the 2006 census, its population was 23, in 5 families. The village is populated by Kurds.
