= Cham Bur-e Farkhinvand =

Village in Ilam, Iran

Cham Bur-e Farkhinvand چم بورفرخينوند
- Village
- Location within Iran
- Coordinates: 33°37′00″N 47°01′00″E
- Country: Iran
- Province: Ilam
- County: Chardavol
- Bakhsh: Zagros
- Rural District: Ghaleh

Population (2006)
  - Total: 252
- Time zone: UTC+3:30 (IRST)
  - Summer (DST): UTC+4:30 (IRDT)

Cham Bur-e Farkhinvand (Persian: چم بورفرخينوند, also Romanized as Cham Būr-e Farkhīnvand; also known as Cham Būr and Chambūr) is a village in Ghaleh Rural District, Zagros District, Chardavol County, Ilam Province, Iran. At the 2006 census, its population was 252, in 53 families. The village is populated by Kurds.
