= Shahrak-e Qods, Ilam =

Shahrak-e Qods شهرك قدس
- Village
- Location within Iran
- Coordinates: 33°36′24″N 46°22′41″E
- Country: Iran
- Province: Ilam
- County: Ilam
- Bakhsh: Central
- Rural District: Deh Pain

Population (2006)
  - Total: 284
- Time zone: UTC+3:30 (IRST)
  - Summer (DST): UTC+4:30 (IRDT)

Shahrak-e Qods (Persian: شهرك قدس) is a village in Deh Pain Rural District, in the Central District of Ilam County, Ilam Province, Iran. At the 2006 census, its population was 284, in 52 families. The village is populated by Kurds.
