= Jaber-e Ansar =

Jaber-e Ansar جابرانصار
- Village
- Location within Iran
- Coordinates: 32°46′10″N 47°08′40″E
- Country: Iran
- Province: Ilam
- County: Abdanan
- Bakhsh: Central
- Rural District: Jaber-e Ansar

Population (2006)
  - Total: 1,017
- Time zone: UTC+3:30 (IRST)
  - Summer (DST): UTC+4:30 (IRDT)

Jaber-e Ansar (Persian: جابرانصار, also Romanized as Jāber-e Anşār; also known as Shahrak-e Jāber-e Anşār) is a village in Jaber-e Ansar Rural District, in the Central District of Abdanan County, Ilam Province, Iran. At the 2006 census, its population was 1,017, in 205 families.
