= Tul Ab =

Tul Ab طولاب
- Village
- Location within Iran
- Coordinates: 33°33′17″N 46°35′06″E
- Country: Iran
- Province: Ilam
- County: Ilam
- Bakhsh: Sivan
- Rural District: Mishkhas

Population (2006)
  - Total: 359
- Time zone: UTC+3:30 (IRST)
  - Summer (DST): UTC+4:30 (IRDT)

Tul Ab (Persian: طولاب, also Romanized as Ţūl Āb and Ţūlāb) is a village in Mishkhas Rural District, in the Sivan District of Ilam County, Ilam Province, Iran. At the 2006 census, its population was 359, in 73 families. The village is populated by Kurds.
