= Palk Gardel =

Coordinates: 33°45′06″N 46°15′39″E

Palk Gardel پلك گردل
- Village
- Interactive map of Palk Gardel
- Country: Iran
- Province: Ilam
- County: Ilam
- Bakhsh: Chavar
- Rural District: Arkavazi

Population (2006)
  - Total: 21
- Time zone: UTC+3:30 (IRST)
  - Summer (DST): UTC+4:30 (IRDT)

Palk Gardel (Persian: پلك گردل) is a village in Arkavazi Rural District, Chavar District, Ilam County, Ilam Province, Iran. At the 2006 census, its population was 21, in 5 families.
