= Cham Namesht =

Cham Namesht چم نمشت
- Village
- Location within Iran
- Coordinates: 33°10′26″N 47°25′07″E
- Country: Iran
- Province: Ilam
- County: Darreh Shahr
- Bakhsh: Central
- Rural District: Zarrin Dasht

Population (2006)
  - Total: 90
- Time zone: UTC+3:30 (IRST)
  - Summer (DST): UTC+4:30 (IRDT)

Cham Namesht (Persian: چم نمشت) is a village in Zarrin Dasht Rural District, in the Central District of Darreh Shahr County, Ilam Province, Iran. At the 2006 census, its population was 90, in 15 families. The village is populated by Kurds.
