= Pelah Kabud =

Village in Ilam, Iran

Pelah Kabud روستای پله كبود (بزرگان درگاهی)
- Village
- Location within Iran
- Coordinates: 33°48′02″N 47°07′22″E
- Country: Iran
- Province: Ilam
- County: Chardavol
- Bakhsh: Holeylan
- Rural District: Helilan

Population (2006)
  - Total: 465
- Time zone: UTC+3:30 (IRST)
  - Summer (DST): UTC+4:30 (IRDT)

Pelah Kabud (Persian: پله كبود بزرگان درگاهی, also Romanized as Pelah Kabūd and Pelleh Kabūd; also known as Pelah Kabūd-e Soflá) is a village in Helilan Rural District, Holeylan District, Chardavol County, Ilam Province, Iran. At the 2006 census, its population was 465, in 91 families. The village is populated by Kurds.
