= Cham Push =

Cham Push چم پوش
- Village
- Location within Iran
- Coordinates: 33°37′28″N 45°48′43″E
- Country: Iran
- Province: Ilam
- County: Chardavol
- Bakhsh: Zagros
- Rural District: Bijnavand

Population (2006)
  - Total: 57
- Time zone: UTC+3:30 (IRST)
  - Summer (DST): UTC+4:30 (IRDT)

Cham Push (Persian: چم پوش, also Romanized as Cham Pūsh and Champūsh) is a village in Bijnavand Rural District, in the Zagros District of Chardavol County, Ilam Province, Iran. At the 2006 census, its population was 57, in 14 families. The village is populated by Kurds.
