= Abu Qarib =

Abu Qarib ابوقريب
- Village
- Location within Iran
- Coordinates: 32°21′44″N 47°48′03″E
- Country: Iran
- Province: Ilam
- County: Dehloran
- Bakhsh: Musian
- Rural District: Dasht-e Abbas

Population (2006)
  - Total: 171
- Time zone: UTC+3:30 (IRST)
  - Summer (DST): UTC+4:30 (IRDT)

Abu Qarib (Persian: ابوقريب, also Romanized as Abū Qarīb) is a village in Dasht-e Abbas Rural District, Musian District, Dehloran County, Ilam Province, Iran. At the 2006 census, its population was 171, in 29 families. The village is populated by Arabs.
