= Beg Beg-e Ban Khoshg =

Beg Beg-e Ban Khoshg بگ بگ بان خشگ
- Village
- Location within Iran
- Coordinates: 33°42′41″N 46°05′37″E
- Country: Iran
- Province: Ilam
- County: Ilam
- Bakhsh: Chavar
- Rural District: Arkavazi

Population (2006)
  - Total: 147
- Time zone: UTC+3:30 (IRST)
  - Summer (DST): UTC+4:30 (IRDT)

Beg Beg-e Ban Khoshg (Persian: بگ بگ بان خشگ, also Romanized as Beg Beg-e Bān Khoshg; also known as Bag Bag Bān Khoshk and Bān Khoshk-e Beg Beg) is a village in Arkavazi Rural District, Chavar District, Ilam County, Ilam Province, Iran. At the 2006 census, its population was 147, in 28 families. The village is populated by Kurds.
