= Sar Choluskan-e Sofla =

Sar Choluskan-e Sofla سرچلوسكان سفلي
- Village
- Location within Iran
- Coordinates: 33°47′00″N 47°26′00″E
- Country: Iran
- Province: Ilam
- County: Chardavol
- Bakhsh: Helilan
- Rural District: Zardalan

Population (2006)
  - Total: 34
- Time zone: UTC+3:30 (IRST)
  - Summer (DST): UTC+4:30 (IRDT)

Sar Choluskan-e Sofla (Persian: سرچلوسكان سفلي, also Romanized as Sar Cholūskān-e Soflá) is a village in Zardalan Rural District, Helilan District, Chardavol County, Ilam Province, Iran. At the 2006 census, its population was 34, in 7 families. The village is populated by Kurds.
