= Shahrak-e Nasr =

Shahrak-e Nasr شهرك نصر
- Village
- Location within Iran
- Coordinates: 32°20′14″N 47°50′56″E
- Country: Iran
- Province: Ilam
- County: Dehloran
- Bakhsh: Musian
- Rural District: Dasht-e Abbas

Population (2006)
  - Total: 547
- Time zone: UTC+3:30 (IRST)
  - Summer (DST): UTC+4:30 (IRDT)

Shahrak-e Nasr (Persian: شهرك نصر, also Romanized as Shahrak-e Naşr; also known as Naşr) is a village in Dasht-e Abbas Rural District, Musian District, Dehloran County, Ilam Province, Iran. At the 2006 census, its population was 547, in 81 families. The village is populated by Arabs.
