= Havian =

Havian هاويان
- Village
- Location within Iran
- Coordinates: 32°51′48″N 46°54′07″E
- Country: Iran
- Province: Ilam
- County: Dehloran
- Bakhsh: Central
- Rural District: Anaran

Population (2006)
  - Total: 59
- Time zone: UTC+3:30 (IRST)
  - Summer (DST): UTC+4:30 (IRDT)

Havian (Persian: هاويان, also Romanized as Hāvīān) is a village in Anaran Rural District, in the Central District of Dehloran County, Ilam Province, Iran. At the 2006 census, its population was 59, in 10 families. The village is populated by Lurs.
