= Palkil =

Palkil پلكيل
- Village
- Location within Iran
- Coordinates: 33°37′54″N 46°58′07″E
- Country: Iran
- Province: Ilam
- County: Chardavol
- Bakhsh: Helilan
- Rural District: Helilan

Population (2006)
  - Total: 33
- Time zone: UTC+3:30 (IRST)
  - Summer (DST): UTC+4:30 (IRDT)

Palkil (Persian: پلكيل, also Romanized as Palḵīl; also known as Pol Kal) is a village in Helilan Rural District, Helilan District, Chardavol County, Ilam Province, Iran. At the 2006 census, its population was 33, in 5 families. The village is populated by Kurds.
