= Pacheh-ye Anjir =

Pacheh-ye Anjir پاچه انجير
- Village
- Country: Iran
- Province: Ilam
- County: Ilam
- Bakhsh: Chavar
- Rural District: Boli

Population (2006)
  - Total: 25
- Time zone: UTC+3:30 (IRST)
  - Summer (DST): UTC+4:30 (IRDT)

Pacheh-ye Anjir (Persian: پاچه انجير, also Romanized as Pācheh-ye Ānjīr) is a village in Boli Rural District, Chavar District, Ilam County, Ilam Province, Iran. At the 2006 census, its population was 25, in 5 families. The village is populated by Kurds.
