= Pahneh Bor, Kurdistan =

Pahneh Bor پهنه بر
- Village
- Location within Iran
- Coordinates: 35°51′22″N 47°21′31″E
- Country: Iran
- Province: Kurdistan
- County: Bijar
- Bakhsh: Central
- Rural District: Howmeh

Population (2006)
  - Total: 49
- Time zone: UTC+3:30 (IRST)
  - Summer (DST): UTC+4:30 (IRDT)

Pahneh Bor (Persian: پهنه بر; also known as Fainābūr and Feynābor) is a village in Howmeh Rural District, in the Central District of Bijar County, Kurdistan Province, Iran. At the 2006 census, its population was 49, in 12 families. The village is populated by Kurds.
