= Taq Tavi =

Taq Tavi طاق تاوي
- Village
- Location within Iran
- Coordinates: 33°43′02″N 46°08′52″E
- Country: Iran
- Province: Ilam
- County: Ilam
- Bakhsh: Chavar
- Rural District: Arkavazi

Population (2006)
  - Total: 13
- Time zone: UTC+3:30 (IRST)
  - Summer (DST): UTC+4:30 (IRDT)

Taq Tavi (Persian: طاق تاوي, also Romanized as Ţāq Tāvī and Ţāqţāvī) is a village in Arkavazi Rural District, Chavar District, Ilam County, Ilam Province, Iran. At the 2006 census, its population was 13, in 4 families. The village is populated by Kurds.
