= Shahbazvand =

Village in Ilam, Iran

Shahbazvand شهبازوند
- Village
- Location within Iran
- Coordinates: 33°43′15″N 46°58′40″E
- Country: Iran
- Province: Ilam
- County: Chardavol
- Bakhsh: Helilan
- Rural District: Helilan

Population (2006)
  - Total: 291
- Time zone: UTC+3:30 (IRST)
  - Summer (DST): UTC+4:30 (IRDT)

Shahbazvand (Persian: شهبازوند, also Romanized as Shahbāzvand; also known as Shahbāzān) is a village in Helilan Rural District, Helilan District, Chardavol County, Ilam Province, Iran. At the 2006 census, its population was 291, in 64 families. The village is populated by Kurds.
