= Qadarti =

Qadarti قدرتي
- Village
- Country: Iran
- Province: Ilam
- County: Abdanan
- Bakhsh: Sarab Bagh
- Rural District: Sarab Bagh

Population (2006)
  - Total: 36
- Time zone: UTC+3:30 (IRST)
  - Summer (DST): UTC+4:30 (IRDT)

Qadarti (Persian: قدرتي, also Romanized as Qadartī) is a village in Sarab Bagh Rural District, Sarab Bagh District, Abdanan County, Ilam Province, Iran. At the 2006 census, its population was 36, in 7 families. The village is populated by Kurds.
