= Chenan =

Chenan چنان
- Village
- Location within Iran
- Coordinates: 33°44′46″N 46°10′22″E
- Country: Iran
- Province: Ilam
- County: Ilam
- Bakhsh: Chavar
- Rural District: Arkavazi

Population (2006)
  - Total: 146
- Time zone: UTC+3:30 (IRST)
  - Summer (DST): UTC+4:30 (IRDT)

Chenan (Persian: چنان, also Romanized as Chenān and Chanān) is a village in Arkavazi Rural District, Chavar District, Ilam County, Ilam Province, Iran. At the 2006 census, its population was 146, in 29 families. The village is populated by Kurds.
