= Cham Zard-e Mahizan =

Cham Zard-e Mahizan چمزردماهيزان
- Village
- Location within Iran
- Coordinates: 33°42′33″N 47°01′35″E
- Country: Iran
- Province: Ilam
- County: Chardavol
- Bakhsh: Helilan
- Rural District: Helilan

Population (2006)
  - Total: 56
- Time zone: UTC+3:30 (IRST)
  - Summer (DST): UTC+4:30 (IRDT)

Cham Zard-e Mahizan (Persian: چمزردماهيزان, also Romanized as Cham Zard-e Māhīzān; also known as Cham Zard) is a village in Helilan Rural District, Helilan District, Chardavol County, Ilam Province, Iran. At the 2006 census, its population was 56, in 10 families. The village is populated by Kurds.
