= Mahuteh =

Village in Ilam, Iran

Mahuteh ماهوته
- Village
- Location within Iran
- Coordinates: 32°53′46″N 47°29′20″E
- Country: Iran
- Province: Ilam
- County: Abdanan
- Bakhsh: Sarab Bagh
- Rural District: Cham Kabud

Population (2006)
  - Total: 173
- Time zone: UTC+3:30 (IRST)
  - Summer (DST): UTC+4:30 (IRDT)

Mahuteh (Persian: ماهوته, also Romanized as Māhūteh) is a village in Cham Kabud Rural District, Sarab Bagh District, Abdanan County, Ilam Province, Iran. At the 2006 census, its population was 173, in 33 families. The village is populated by Lurs.
