= Dul Kalan =

Dul Kalan دول كلان
- Village
- Country: Iran
- Province: Ilam
- County: Chardavol
- Bakhsh: Zagros
- Rural District: Bijnavand

Population (2006)
  - Total: 112
- Time zone: UTC+3:30 (IRST)
  - Summer (DST): UTC+4:30 (IRDT)

Dul Kalan (Persian: دول كلان, also Romanized as Dūl Kalān) is a village in Bijnavand Rural District, in the Zagros District of Chardavol County, Ilam Province, Iran. At the 2006 census, its population was 112, in 23 families. The village is populated by Kurds.
