= Aliabad-e Kuchak =

Aliabad-e Kuchak علي ابادكوچك
- Village
- Location within Iran
- Coordinates: 33°06′36″N 46°47′54″E
- Country: Iran
- Province: Ilam
- County: Dehloran
- Bakhsh: Zarrinabad
- Rural District: Seyyed Nasereddin

Population (2006)
  - Total: 184
- Time zone: UTC+3:30 (IRST)
  - Summer (DST): UTC+4:30 (IRDT)

Aliabad-e Kuchak (Persian: علي ابادكوچك, also Romanized as ‘Alīābād-e Kūchak) is a village in Seyyed Nasereddin Rural District, Zarrinabad District, Dehloran County, Ilam Province, Iran. At the 2006 census, its population was 184, in 35 families. The village is populated by Kurds.
