= Banqalan =

Banqalan بانقلان
- Village
- Location within Iran
- Coordinates: 33°37′18″N 46°22′31″E
- Country: Iran
- Province: Ilam
- County: Ilam
- Bakhsh: Central
- Rural District: Deh Pain

Population (2006)
  - Total: 2,586
- Time zone: UTC+3:30 (IRST)
  - Summer (DST): UTC+4:30 (IRDT)
- Climate: Csa

Banqalan (Persian: بانقلان, also Romanized as Bānqalān; also known as Bāneh Kalān and Bāngalān) is a village in Deh Pain Rural District, in the Central District of Ilam County, Ilam Province, Iran. At the 2006 census, its population was 2,586, in 510 families. The village is populated by Kurds.
