= Bankat =

Bankat بانكت
- Village
- Location within Iran
- Coordinates: 32°57′23″N 47°26′46″E
- Country: Iran
- Province: Ilam
- County: Abdanan
- Bakhsh: Central
- Rural District: Jaber-e Ansar

Population (2006)
  - Total: 297
- Time zone: UTC+3:30 (IRST)
  - Summer (DST): UTC+4:30 (IRDT)

Bankat (Persian: بانكت, also Romanized as Bānḵat; also known as Shamshīrābād) is a village in Jaber-e Ansar Rural District, in the Central District of Abdanan County, Ilam Province, Iran. At the 2006 census, its population was 297, in 59 families. The village is populated by Kurds.
