= Mahtabi =

Mahtabi مهتابي
- Village
- Location within Iran
- Coordinates: 33°03′21″N 47°34′35″E
- Country: Iran
- Province: Ilam
- County: Darreh Shahr
- Bakhsh: Central
- Rural District: Aramu

Population (2006)
  - Total: 298
- Time zone: UTC+3:30 (IRST)
  - Summer (DST): UTC+4:30 (IRDT)

Mahtabi (Persian: مهتابي, also Romanized as Mahtābī) is a village in Aramu Rural District, in the Central District of Darreh Shahr County, Ilam Province, Iran. At the 2006 census, its population was 298, in 55 families. The village is populated by Lurs.
