= Sangar Nader =

Sangar Nader سنگرنادر
- Village
- Location within Iran
- Coordinates: 32°46′18″N 47°01′21″E
- Country: Iran
- Province: Ilam
- County: Dehloran
- Bakhsh: Central
- Rural District: Anaran

Population (2006)
  - Total: 28
- Time zone: UTC+3:30 (IRST)
  - Summer (DST): UTC+4:30 (IRDT)

Sangar Nader (Persian: سنگرنادر, also Romanized as Sangar Nāder and Sangar-e Nāder; also known as Sangat-e Nāder) is a village in Anaran Rural District, in the Central District of Dehloran County, Ilam Province, Iran. At the 2006 census, its population was 28, in 5 families. The village is populated by Lurs.
