= Mazhareh =

Mazhareh مژاره
- Village
- Location within Iran
- Coordinates: 32°52′00″N 47°40′00″E
- Country: Iran
- Province: Ilam
- County: Abdanan
- Bakhsh: Sarab Bagh
- Rural District: Sarab Bagh

Population (2006)
  - Total: 34
- Time zone: UTC+3:30 (IRST)
  - Summer (DST): UTC+4:30 (IRDT)

Mazhareh (Persian: مژاره, also Romanized as Mazhāreh; also known as Mazhādeh) is a village in Sarab Bagh Rural District, Sarab Bagh District, Abdanan County, Ilam Province, Iran. At the 2006 census, its population was 34, in 7 families. The village is populated by Kurds.
