= Pahneh Bor, Shirvan =

Pahneh Bor پهنه بر
- Village
- Location within Iran
- Coordinates: 33°39′05″N 46°40′24″E
- Country: Iran
- Province: Ilam
- County: Sirvan
- Bakhsh: Karezan
- Rural District: Zangvan

Population (2006)
  - Total: 137
- Time zone: UTC+3:30 (IRST)
  - Summer (DST): UTC+4:30 (IRDT)

Pahneh Bor (Persian: پهنه بر; also known as Panābar) is a village in Zangvan Rural District, Karezan District, Sirvan County, Ilam Province, Iran. At the 2006 census, its population was 137, in 29 families. The village is populated by Kurds.
