= Qaleh Tasmeh =

Qaleh Tasmeh قلعه تسمه
- Village
- Location within Iran
- Coordinates: 33°12′17″N 47°18′21″E
- Country: Iran
- Province: Ilam
- County: Darreh Shahr
- Bakhsh: Central
- Rural District: Zarrin Dasht

Population (2006)
  - Total: 1,021
- Time zone: UTC+3:30 (IRST)
  - Summer (DST): UTC+4:30 (IRDT)

Qaleh Tasmeh (Persian: قلعه تسمه, also Romanized as Qal‘eh Tasmeh) is a village in Zarrin Dasht Rural District, in the Central District of Darreh Shahr County, Ilam Province, Iran. At the 2006 census, its population was 1,021, in 197 families. The village is populated by Kurds.
