= Pahneh Bor, Ilam =

Pahneh Bor پهنه بر
- Village
- Location within Iran
- Coordinates: 33°39′00″N 46°46′27″E
- Country: Iran
- Province: Ilam
- County: Chardavol
- Bakhsh: Zagros
- Rural District: Bijnavand

Population (2006)
  - Total: 60
- Time zone: UTC+3:30 (IRST)
  - Summer (DST): UTC+4:30 (IRDT)

Pahneh Bor (Persian: پهنه بر) is a village in Bijnavand Rural District, in the Zagros District of Chardavol County, Ilam Province, Iran. At the 2006 census, its population was 60, in 9 families. The village is populated by Kurds.
