= Abanar Rural District =

Rural district in Ilam province, Iran

Abanar Rural District Persian: دهستان آب انار
- Rural District
- Location within Iran Location within Ilam Province
- Coordinates: 32°42′38″N 47°52′26″E
- Country: Iran
- Province: Ilam
- County: Abdanan
- District: Kalat
- Capital: Abanar

Population (2016)
  - Total: 2,119
- Time zone: UTC+3:30 (IRST)

Abanar Rural District (Persian: دهستان آب انار) is in Kalat District of Abdanan County, Ilam province, Iran. Its capital is the village of Abanar.

== Demographics ==
=== Population ===
At the time of the 2006 National Census, the rural district's population was 2,149 in 380 households. There were 2,158 inhabitants in 487 households at the following census of 2011. The 2016 census measured the population of the rural district as 2,119 in 549 households. The most populous of its nine villages was Abanar, with 1,322 people.
