= Zangvan Rural District =

Rural district in Ilam province, Iran

Zangvan Rural District Persian: دهستان زنگوان
- Rural District
- Location within Iran Location within Ilam Province
- Coordinates: 33°36′27″N 46°39′07″E
- Country: Iran
- Province: Ilam
- County: Sirvan
- District: Karezan
- Capital: Shahrak-e Sartang

Population (2016)
  - Total: 3,360
- Time zone: UTC+3:30 (IRST)

Zangvan Rural District (Persian: دهستان زنگوان) is in Karezan District of Sirvan County, Ilam province, Iran. Its capital is the village of Shahrak-e Sartang.

== Demographics ==
=== Population ===
At the time of the 2006 National Census, the rural district's population (as a part of the former Shirvan District of Chardavol County (Note: Formerly Shirvan and Chardavol County)) was 3,679 in 764 households. There were 3,695 inhabitants in 904 households at the following census of 2011. The 2016 census measured the population of the rural district as 3,360 in 874 households, by which time the district had been separated from the county in the establishment of Sirvan County. The rural district was transferred to the new Karezan District. The most populous of its 22 villages was Shahrak-e Sartang, with 786 people.
