= Nabovat Rural District =

Rural district in Ilam province, Iran

Nabovat Rural District Persian: دهستان نبوت
- Rural District
- Location within Iran Location within Ilam Province
- Coordinates: 33°50′31″N 46°15′16″E
- Country: Iran
- Province: Ilam
- County: Eyvan
- District: Central
- Capital: Shahrak-e Nabovat

Population (2016)
  - Total: 6,204
- Time zone: UTC+3:30 (IRST)

Nabovat Rural District (Persian: دهستان نبوت) (Note: Formerly Sarab-e Eyvan Rural District (دهستان سراب ایوان)) is in the Central District of Eyvan County, Ilam province, Iran. Its capital is the village of Shahrak-e Nabovat.

== Demographics ==
=== Population ===
At the time of the 2006 National Census, the rural district's population was 6,416 in 1,258 households. There were 6,467 inhabitants in 1,547 households at the following census of 2011. The 2016 census measured the population of the rural district as 6,204 in 1,753 households. The most populous of its 28 villages was Shahrak-e Nabovat, with 1,509 people.
