= Kalat District (Iran) =

District in Ilam province, Iran

Kalat District Persian: بخش کلات
- District
- Location within Iran Location within Ilam Province
- Coordinates: 32°39′57″N 47°47′07″E
- Country: Iran
- Province: Ilam
- County: Abdanan
- Capital: Murmuri

Population (2016)
  - Total: 6,847
- Time zone: UTC+3:30 (IRST)

Kalat District (Persian: بخش کلات) is in Abdanan County, Ilam province, Iran. Its capital is the city of Murmuri.

== Demographics ==
=== Population ===
At the time of the 2006 National Census, the district's population was 6,812 in 1,285 households. The following census in 2011 counted 6,614 people in 1,562 households. The 2016 census measured the population of the district as 6,847 inhabitants in 1,849 households.

=== Administrative divisions ===
Kalat District Population
Administrative Divisions	2006	2011	2016
Abanar RD	2,149	2,158	2,119
Murmuri RD	1,172	927	960
Murmuri (city)	3,491	3,529	3,768
Total	6,812	6,614	6,847
RD = Rural District
