= Mazhin Rural District =

Rural district in Ilam province, Iran

Mazhin Rural District Persian: دهستان ماژين
- Rural District
- Location within Iran Location within Ilam Province
- Coordinates: 32°53′14″N 47°52′41″E
- Country: Iran
- Province: Ilam
- County: Darreh Shahr
- District: Mazhin
- Capital: Meydan Khalaf

Population (2016)
  - Total: 1,250
- Time zone: UTC+3:30 (IRST)

Mazhin Rural District (Persian: دهستان ماژين) is in Mazhin District of Darreh Shahr County, Ilam province, Iran. Its capital is the village of Meydan Khalaf. The previous capital of the rural district was the village of Mazhin, now a city.

== Demographics ==
=== Population ===
At the time of the 2006 National Census, the rural district's population was 3,166 in 619 households. There were 2,827 inhabitants in 680 households at the following census of 2011. The 2016 census measured the population of the rural district as 1,250 in 348 households. The most populous of its 24 villages was Meydan Khalaf, with 327 people.
