= Darbid, Iran =

Darbid or Dar-e Bid or Dar Bid or Dorbid (Persian: داربيد) may refer to:

== Ilam Province ==
- Darbid Rural District, an administrative division of Holeylan County
- Darbid-e Karani, a village in Shirvan and Chardaval County

== Kermanshah Province ==
- Darbid-e Mansuri, a village in Eslamabad-e Gharb County
- Darbid-e Ali Akbar, a village in Gilan-e Gharb County
- Darbid-e Hoseyn Ali, a village in Gilan-e Gharb County
- Darbid-e Nazer Ali, a village in Gilan-e Gharb County
- Darbid, Kangavar, a village in Kangavar County

== Lorestan Province ==
- Darbid Haft Cheshmeh-e Olya, a village in Delfan County
- Darbid Haft Cheshmeh-e Sofla, a village in Delfan County
- Darbid-e Zangivand, a village in Delfan County
- Darbid-e Olya, a village in Selseleh County
- Darbid-e Sofla, a village in Selseleh County
- Darbid-e Vosta, a village in Selseleh County

== Yazd Province ==
- Darbid, Yazd, a village in Yazd County
