= Dar Tut =

Dar Tut or Dar-e Tut or Dartut (Persian: دارتوت) may refer to:

- Dar Tut, Ilam
- Dartut, Shirvan and Chardaval, Ilam Province
- Dartut, Kermanshah
- Dartut-e Movvali, Kermanshah Province
- Dartut-e Rahim, Kermanshah Province
- Dar Tut, Kurdistan
- Dar Tut, Lorestan
- Dartut, Lorestan
