= Shineh =

Shineh (Persian: شينه) may refer to the following places in Iran:

- Shineh, Kermanshah
- Shineh, Kurdistan
- Shineh-ye Sharifabad, Kurdistan Province
- Shineh-ye Olya, Lorestan Province
- Shineh-ye Sofla, Lorestan Province
- Shineh, alternate name of Cham Shateh-ye Sofla
