= Sarcham, Ilam =

Village in Ilam province, Iran

Sarcham Persian: سرچم
- Village
- Location within Iran Location within Ilam Province
- Coordinates: 33°43′58″N 47°13′24″E
- Country: Iran
- Province: Ilam
- County: Holeylan
- District: Jazman
- Rural District: Darbid

Population (2016)
  - Total: 520
- Time zone: UTC+3:30 (IRST)

Sarcham (Persian: سرچم) (Note: Also romanized as Sar Cham) is a village in, and the capital of, Darbid Rural District of Jazman District, Holeylan County, Ilam province, Iran.

== Demographics ==
=== Ethnicity ===
The village is populated by Kurds.

=== Population ===
At the time of the 2006 National Census, the village's population was 502 in 98 households, when it was in Holeylan Rural District (Note: Renamed Guran Rural District) of the former Holeylan District of Chardavol County. (Note: Formerly Shirvan and Chardavol County) The following census in 2011 counted 517 people in 127 households. The 2016 census measured the population of the village as 520 people in 137 households.

In 2018, the district was separated from the county in the establishment of Holeylan County. The rural district was transferred to the new Central District and renamed Guran Rural District. Sar Cham was transferred to Darbid Rural District created in the new Jazman District.
