= Mahdiyeh, Ilam =

Village in Ilam province, Iran

Mahdiyeh Persian: مهديه
- Village
- Location within Iran Location within Ilam Province
- Coordinates: 33°43′27″N 46°59′03″E
- Country: Iran
- Province: Ilam
- County: Holeylan
- District: Central
- Rural District: Dajivand

Population (2016)
  - Total: 517
- Time zone: UTC+3:30 (IRST)

Mahdiyeh (Persian: مهديه) (Note: Also romanized as Mahdīyeh) is a village in, and the capital of, Dajivand Rural District of the Central District of Holeylan County, Ilam province, Iran.

== Demographics ==
=== Ethnicity ===
The village is populated by Kurds.

=== Population ===
At the time of the 2006 National Census, the village's population was 557 in 102 households, when it was in Holeylan Rural District (Note: Renamed Guran Rural District) of the former Holeylan District of Chardavol County. (Note: Formerly Shirvan and Chardavol County) The following census in 2011 counted 497 people in 122 households. The 2016 census measured the population of the village as 517 people in 143 households.

In 2018, the district was separated from the county in the establishment of Holeylan County. The rural district was transferred to the new Central District and renamed Guran Rural District. Mahdiyeh was transferred to Dajivand Rural District created in the district.
