= Zardalu, Ardabil =

Rural district in Ilam province, Iran

Zardalan Rural District Persian: دهستان زردلان
- Rural District
- Location within Iran Location within Ilam Province
- Coordinates: 33°49′30″N 47°25′00″E
- Country: Iran
- Province: Ilam
- County: Holeylan
- District: Jazman
- Capital: Piyazabad

Population (2016)
  - Total: 2,514
- Time zone: UTC+3:30 (IRST)

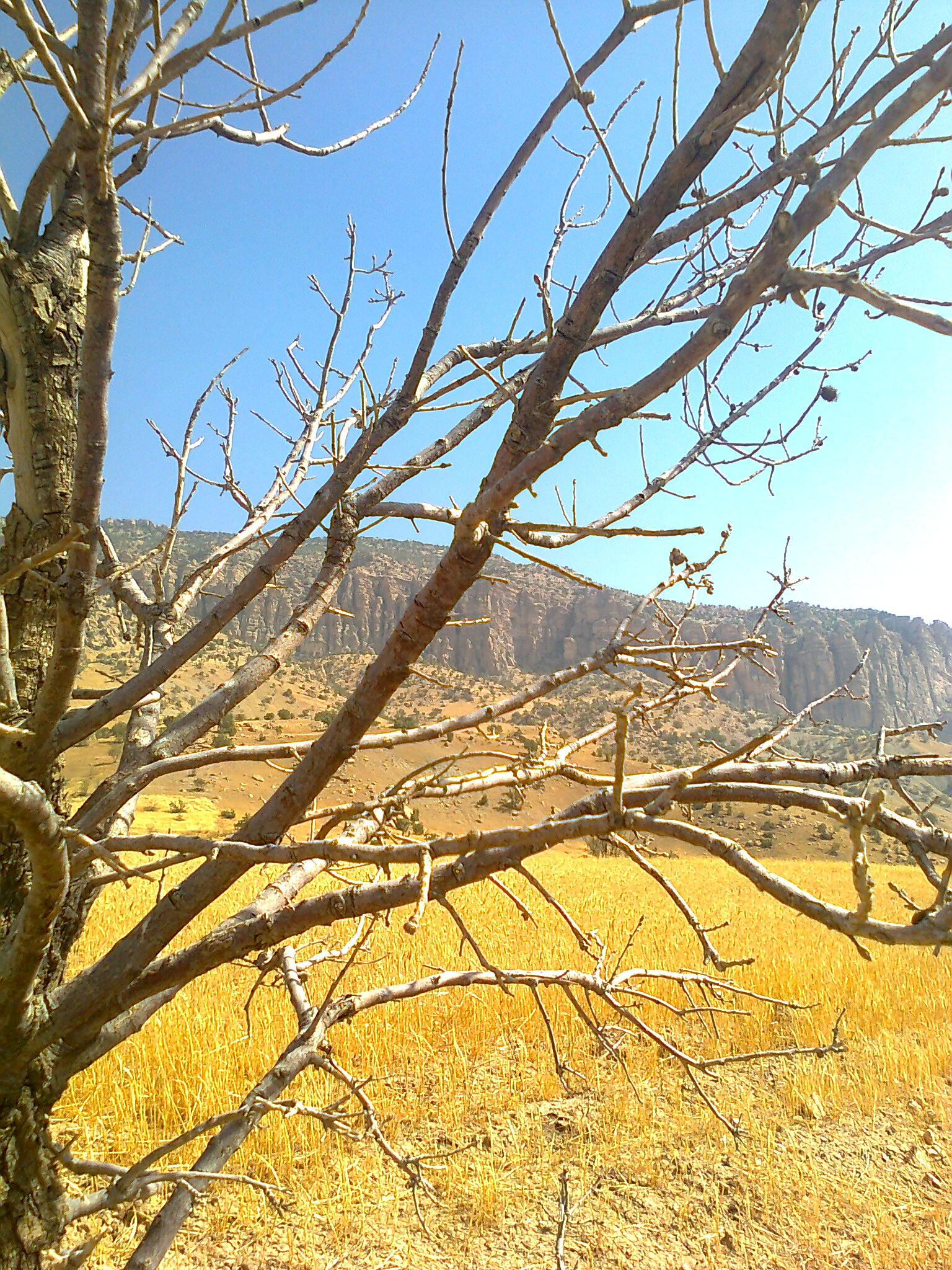
A landscape view of the Zardalan Rural District in Holeylan County, Ilam Province, Iran

Zardalan Rural District (Persian: دهستان زردلان) is in Jazman District of Holeylan County, Ilam province, Iran. Its capital is the village of Piyazabad.

== Demographics ==
=== Population ===
At the time of the 2006 National Census, the rural district's population (as a part of the former Holeylan District of Chardavol County (Note: Formerly Shirvan and Chardavol County)) was 2,518 in 512 households. There were 2,527 inhabitants in 590 households at the following census of 2011. The 2016 census measured the population of the rural district as 2,514 in 650 households. The most populous of its 31 villages was Piyazabad, with 389 people.

In 2018, the district was separated from the county in the establishment of Holeylan County, and the rural district was transferred to the new Jazman District.
