= Cheshmeh Mahi, Ilam =

Village in Ilam province, Iran

Cheshmeh Mahi Persian: چشمه ماهي
- Village
- Location within Iran Location within Ilam Province
- Coordinates: 33°43′50″N 47°08′26″E
- Country: Iran
- Province: Ilam
- County: Holeylan
- District: Jazman
- Rural District: Darbid

Population (2016)
  - Total: 827
- Time zone: UTC+3:30 (IRST)

Cheshmeh Mahi (Persian: چشمه ماهي) (Note: Also romanized as Cheshmeh Māhī; also known as Sāmān) is a village in Darbid Rural District of Jazman District, Holeylan County, Ilam province, Iran, serving as capital of the district.

== Demographics ==
=== Ethnicity ===
The village is populated by Kurds.

=== Population ===
At the time of the 2006 National Census, the village's population wa 816 in 161 households, when it was in Holeylan Rural District (Note: Renamed Guran Rural District) of the former Holeylan District of Chardavol County. The following census in 2011 counted 597 people in 148 households. The 2016 census measured the population of the village as 827 people in 246 households.

In 2018, the district was separated from the county in the establishment of Holeylan County. The rural district was transferred to the new Central District and renamed Guran Rural District. Cheshmeh Mahi was transferred to Darbid Rural District created in the new Jazman District.
