= Khor-e Shir Ali =

Khor-e Shir Ali خرشيرعلي
- Village
- Location within Iran
- Coordinates: 33°44′17″N 46°37′47″E
- Country: Iran
- Province: Ilam
- County: Chardavol
- Bakhsh: Shabab
- Rural District: Shabab

Population (2006)
  - Total: 103
- Time zone: UTC+3:30 (IRST)
  - Summer (DST): UTC+4:30 (IRDT)

Khor-e Shir Ali (Persian: خرشيرعلي, also Romanized as Khor-e Shīr ‘Alī; also known as Jūb-e Shīr ‘Alī) is a village in Shabab Rural District 20 kilometers from Sarableh, in the Shabab District of Chardavol County, Ilam Province, Iran. At the 2006 census, its population was 103, in 28 families.

The village is populated by Kurds.
