= Pa Takht =

Pa Takht (Persian: پاتخت) may refer to:

- Pa Takht, Isfahan
- Pa Takht 1, Lorestan Province
- Pa Takht 2, Lorestan Province
- Pa Takht 3, Lorestan Province
- Patakht, Ilam Province

== See also ==
- Pa-ye Takht (disambiguation)
