= Zanjireh-ye Olya =

Village in Ilam province, Iran

Zanjireh-ye Olya Persian: زنجيره عليا
- Village
- Location within Iran Location within Ilam Province
- Coordinates: 33°48′26″N 46°34′05″E
- Country: Iran
- Province: Ilam
- County: Chardavol
- District: Shabab
- Rural District: Zanjireh

Population (2016)
  - Total: 2,724
- Time zone: UTC+3:30 (IRST)

Zanjireh-ye Olya (Persian: زنجيره عليا) (Note: Also romanized as Zanjīreh-ye ‘Olyā; also known as Zanjīreh) is a village in, and the capital of, Zanjireh Rural District of Shabab District, Chardavol County, (Note: Formerly Shirvan and Chardavol County) Ilam province, Iran.

== Demographics ==
=== Ethnicity ===
The village is populated by Kurds.

=== Population ===
At the time of the 2006 National Census, the village's population was 2,519 in 532 households, when it was in Shabab Rural District of the Central District. The following census in 2011 counted 2,709 people in 709 households. The 2016 census measured the population of the village as 2,724 people in 786 households, by which time the rural district had been separated from the district in the formation of Shabab District. Zanjireh-ye Olya was transferred to Zanjireh Rural District created in the new district. It was the most populous village in its rural district.
