= Kahreh =

Village in Ilam province, Iran

Kahreh Persian: كهره
- Village
- Location within Iran Location within Ilam Province
- Coordinates: 33°44′19″N 47°02′18″E
- Country: Iran
- Province: Ilam
- County: Holeylan
- District: Central
- Rural District: Guran

Population (2016)
  - Total: 1,600
- Time zone: UTC+3:30 (IRST)

Kahreh (Persian: كهره) (Note: Also romanized as Kahareh; also known as Bara Khaireh) is a village in, and a former capital of, Guran Rural District (Note: Formerly Holeylan Rural District) of the Central District of Holeylan County, Ilam province, Iran. The previous capital of the rural district was the village of Towhid, now a city. Its capital has been transferred to the village of Shiravand.

== Demographics ==
=== Ethnicity ===
The village is populated by Kurds.

=== Population ===
At the time of the 2006 National Census, the village's population was 1,898 in 379 households, when it was in Holeylan Rural District (Note: Renamed Guran Rural District) of the former Holeylan District of Chardavol County. (Note: Formerly Shirvan and Chardavol County) The following census in 2011 counted 1,776 people in 448 households. The 2016 census measured the population of the village as 1,600 people in 458 households. It was the most populous village in its rural district.

In 2018, the district was separated from the county in the establishment of Holeylan County. The rural district was transferred to the new Central District and renamed Guran Rural District.
