= Shiravand, Ilam =

Village in Ilam province, Iran

Shiravand Persian: شيراوند
- Village
- Location within Iran Location within Ilam Province
- Coordinates: 33°45′36″N 47°05′19″E
- Country: Iran
- Province: Ilam
- County: Holeylan
- District: Central
- Rural District: Guran

Population (2016)
  - Total: 1,391
- Time zone: UTC+3:30 (IRST)

Shiravand (Persian: شيراوند) (Note: Also romanized as Shīrāvand; also known as Jūb Shahr) is a village in, and the capital of, Guran Rural District (Note: Formerly Holeylan Rural District) of the Central District of Holeylan County, Ilam province, Iran. The previous capital of the rural district was the village of Kahreh. Prior to this, its capital was the village of Towhid, now a city.

== Demographics ==
=== Ethnicity ===
The village is populated by Kurds with a Lur minority.

=== Population ===
At the time of the 2006 National Census, the village's population was 1,150 in 224 households, when it was in Holeylan Rural District (Note: Renamed Guran Rural District) of the former Holeylan District of Chardavol County. (Note: Formerly Shirvan and Chardavol County) The following census in 2011 counted 1,086 people in 282 households. The 2016 census measured the population of the village as 1,391 people in 392 households.

In 2018, the district was separated from the county in the establishment of Holeylan County. The rural district was transferred to the new Central District and renamed Guran Rural District.
