= Sorkh-e Kan, Ilam =

Sorkh-e Kan سرخكان
- Village
- Location within Iran
- Coordinates: 33°49′17″N 46°42′06″E
- Country: Iran
- Province: Ilam
- County: Chardavol
- Bakhsh: Shabab District
- Rural District: Shabab

Population (2006)
  - Total: 377
- Time zone: UTC+3:30 (IRST)
  - Summer (DST): UTC+4:30 (IRDT)

Sorkh-e Kan (Persian: سرخكان, also Romanized as Sorkh-e Kān; also known as Sorkheh Khānī) is a village in Shabab Rural District, in the Shabab District of Chardavol County, Ilam Province, Iran. At the 2006 census, its population was 377, in 85 families. The village is populated by Kurds.
