= Halesam =

Village in Ilam province, Iran

Halesam Persian: هله سم
- Village
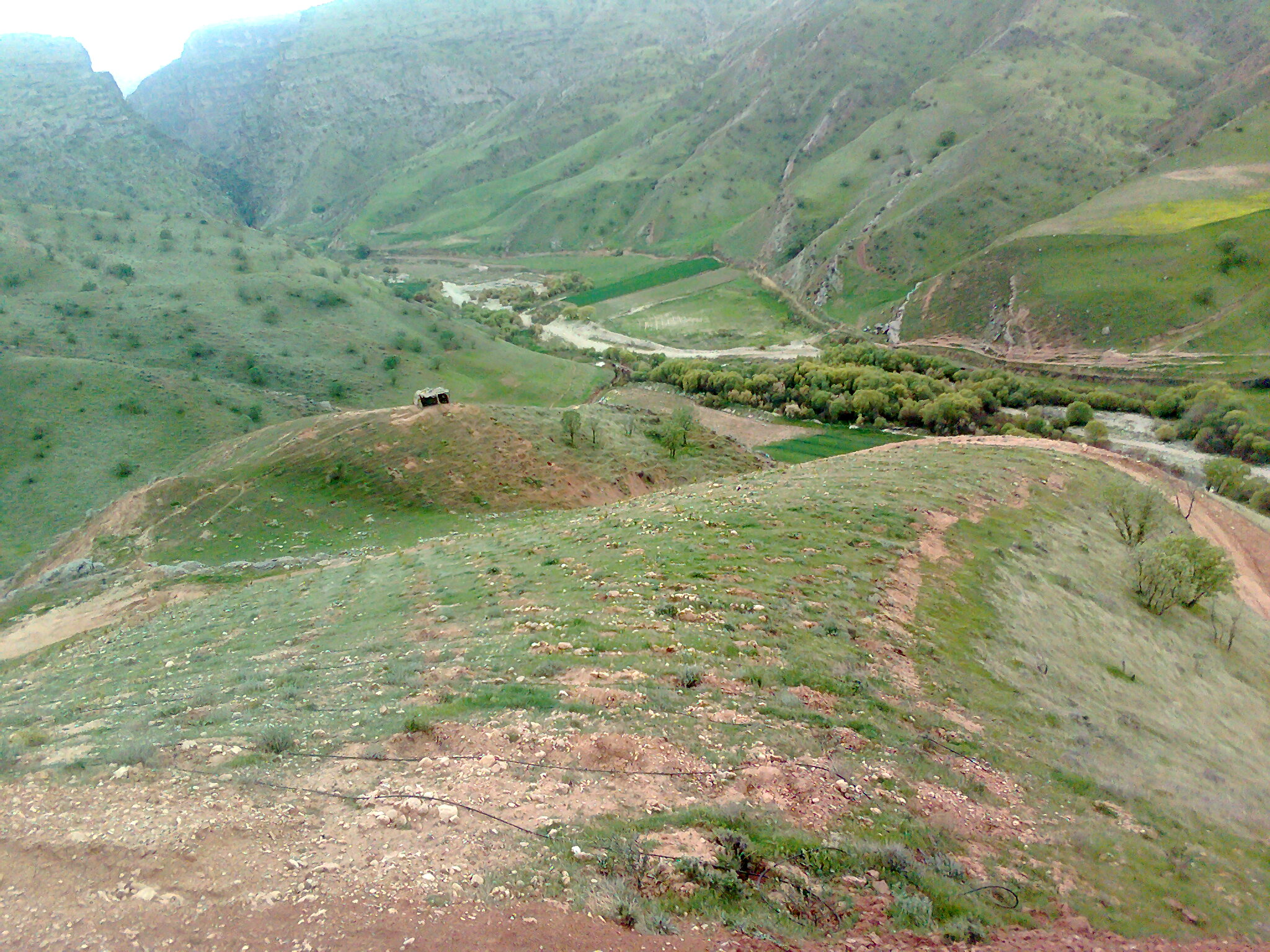

- Location within Iran Location within Ilam Province
- Coordinates: 33°41′31″N 46°41′52″E
- Country: Iran
- Province: Ilam
- County: Chardavol
- District: Central
- Rural District: Halesam

Population (2016)
  - Total: 494
- Time zone: UTC+3:30 (IRST)

Halesam (Persian: هلسم) (Note: Also known as Haleh Sam (هله سم) and Halehsam) is a village in, and the capital of, Halesam Rural District of the Central District of Chardavol County, (Note: Formerly Shirvan and Chardavol County) Ilam province, Iran. It was the capital of Shabab Rural District until its capital was transferred to the village of Sang-e Sefid.

== Demographics ==
=== Ethnicity ===
The village is populated by Kurds.

=== Population ===
At the time of the 2006 National Census, the village had a population of 663 in 137 households, when it was in Shabab Rural District of the Central District. The following census in 2011 recorded 630 people in 156 households. By the 2016 census, the population had declined to 494 in 140 households. By that time, the rural district had been separated from the district in the establishment of Shabab District. It was the most populous village in its rural district.

After the census, Halesam was transferred to Halesam Rural District, which was created in the Central District.
