= Cham Kabud, Ilam =

Village in Ilam, Iran

Cham Kabud چم كبود
- Village
- Location within Iran
- Coordinates: 33°42′17″N 46°39′22″E
- Country: Iran
- Province: Ilam
- County: Chardavol
- Bakhsh: Shabab
- Rural District: Shabab

Population (2006)
  - Total: 53
- Time zone: UTC+3:30 (IRST)
  - Summer (DST): UTC+4:30 (IRDT)

Cham Kabud (Persian: چم كبود, also Romanized as Cham Kabūd; also known as Cheshmeh Kabūd) is a village in Shabab Rural District, in the Shabab District of Chardavol County, Ilam Province, Iran. At the 2006 census, its population was 53, in 10 families. The village is populated by Kurds.
