= Poshteh-ye Vamarz =

Poshteh-ye Vamarz پشته وامرز
- village
- Location within Iran
- Coordinates: 33°52′12″N 46°29′52″E
- Country: Iran
- Province: Ilam
- County: Chardavol
- Bakhsh: Asemanabad
- Rural District: Kol Kol

Population (2006)
  - Total: 137
- Time zone: UTC+3:30 (IRST)
  - Summer (DST): UTC+4:30 (IRDT)

Poshteh-ye Vamarz (Persian: پشته وامرز, also Romanized as Poshteh-ye Vāmarz) is a village in Kol Kol Rural District, in the Asemanabad District of Chardavol County, Ilam Province, Iran. At the 2006 census, its population was 137, in 26 families. The village is populated by Kurds.
