= Al-Shabab =

Al-Shabab or Al-Shabaab (Arabic: الشباب, lit. 'the Youth') may refer to:

== Football clubs ==
- Al Shabab Al Arabi Club Beirut, in Lebanon, now Ansar Al Mawadda SC
- Al Shabab Al Arabi Club (Dubai), in the United Arab Emirates
- Al-Shabab Club (Manama), in Bahrain
- Al Shabab FC (Riyadh), in Saudi Arabia
- Al-Shabab SC (Kuwait)
- Al-Shabab SC (Iraq)
- Al-Shabab SC (Seeb), in Oman
- Al-Shabab SC (Syria)
- Chabab SC Ghazieh, in Lebanon
- Shabab Al Ahli Club, in Dubai, United Arab Emirates
- Shabab Al-Aqaba SC, in Aqaba, Jordan
- Shabaab al Jabal, in Libya
- Shabab Al-Ordon SC, in Amman, Jordan
- Shabab Al-Ordon Club (women), in Amman, Jordan
- Shabab Al Sahel FC, in Lebanon
- Shabab El Bourj SC, in Lebanon
- Shabab Rafah, in Palestine
- Muaither SC, in Qatar, previously known as Al Shahab

== Groups ==
- Al-Shabaab (militant group), in Somalia
- Al-Shabab Al-Muslim, an Islamic extremist Palestinian coalition
- Al-Shabaab (Mozambique), an Islamist rebel group

== Places ==
- Shabab District, Chardavol County, Ilam province, Iran
  - Shabab Rural District
  - Shabab, Iran, a city

== People ==
- Yasser Abu Shabab, Palestinian militant
- Khalifa ibn Khayyat, nicknamed Shabab

== Other uses ==
- Shabaab (film), a 1954 Indian film
- Shabab, fictional character portrayed by Ratna Bhushan in the 1960 Indian film Barsaat Ki Raat

== See also ==
- RNOV Shabab Oman, two ships of the Royal Omani Navy
