= Varegah, Ilam =

Varegah وارگه
- village
- Location within Iran
- Coordinates: 33°56′16″N 46°19′48″E
- Country: Iran
- Province: Ilam
- County: Chardavol
- Bakhsh: Asemanabad
- Rural District: Kol Kol

Population (2006)
  - Total: 1,019
- Time zone: UTC+3:30 (IRST)
  - Summer (DST): UTC+4:30 (IRDT)

Varegah (Persian: وارگه, also Romanized as Vāregah; also known as Vārgar) is a village in Kol Kol Rural District, in the Asemanabad District of Chardavol County, Ilam Province, Iran. At the 2006 census, its population was 1,019, in 215 families. The village is populated by Kurds.
