= Piyazabad, Ilam =

Village in Ilam province, Iran

Piyazabad Persian: پيازاباد
- Village
- Location within Iran Location within Ilam Province
- Coordinates: 33°49′01″N 47°24′33″E
- Country: Iran
- Province: Ilam
- County: Holeylan
- District: Jazman
- Rural District: Zardalan

Population (2016)
  - Total: 389
- Time zone: UTC+3:30 (IRST)

Piyazabad (Persian: پيازاباد) (Note: Also romanized as Piazabad, Pīāzābād, Pīyāz Ābād, and Pīyāzābād) is a village in, and the capital of, Zardalan Rural District of Jazman District, Holeylan County, Ilam province, Iran.

== Demographics ==
=== Ethnicity ===
The village is populated by Kurds.

=== Population ===
At the time of the 2006 National Census, the village's population was 443 in 87 households, when it was in the former Holeylan District of Chardavol County. (Note: Formerly Shirvan and Chardavol County) The following census in 2011 counted 403 people in 96 households. The 2016 census measured the population of the village as 389 people in 100 households. It was the most populous village in its rural district.

In 2018, the district was separated from the county in the establishment of Holeylan County, and the rural district was transferred to the new Jazman District.
