= Kol Kol-e Olya, Chardavol =

Village in Ilam province, Iran

Kol Kol-e Olya Persian: كل كل عليا
- Village
- Location within Iran Location within Ilam Province
- Coordinates: 33°53′57″N 46°24′06″E
- Country: Iran
- Province: Ilam
- County: Chardavol
- District: Asemanabad
- Rural District: Kol Kol

Population (2016)
  - Total: 1,576
- Time zone: UTC+3:30 (IRST)

Kol Kol-e Olya (Persian: كل كل عليا) (Note: Also romanized as Kol Kol-e ‘Olyā; also known as Kol Kol and Kolkol-e Āsmanābād) is a village in, and the capital of, Kol Kol Rural District of Asemanabad District, Chardavol County, (Note: Formerly Shirvan and Chardavol County) Ilam province, Iran.

== Demographics ==
=== Ethnicity ===
The village is populated by Kurds.

=== Population ===
At the time of the 2006 National Census, the village's population was 1,775 in 331 households, when it was in Asemanabad Rural District of the Central District. The following census in 2011 counted 1,603 people in 378 households. The 2016 census measured the population of the village as 1,576 people in 448 households. It was the most populous village in its rural district.

After the census, the rural district was separated from the district in the formation of Asemanabad District. Kol Kol-e Olya was transferred to Kol Kol Rural District created in the new district.
