= Pir Jad =

Pir Jad may refer to:

- Pirijed
- Pirjed
- Pirjad-e Pain
