= Poshteh-ye Kol Kol =

Poshteh-ye Kol Kol پشته كل كل
- village
- Location within Iran
- Coordinates: 33°52′55″N 46°28′39″E
- Country: Iran
- Province: Ilam
- County: Chardavol
- Bakhsh: Asemanabad
- Rural District: Kol Kol

Population (2006)
  - Total: 111
- Time zone: UTC+3:30 (IRST)
  - Summer (DST): UTC+4:30 (IRDT)

Poshteh-ye Kol Kol (Persian: پشته كل كل; also known as Peleh-ye Kolkol and Pelleh Kalkal) is a village in Kol Kol Rural District, in the Asemanabad District of Chardavol County, Ilam Province, Iran. At the 2006 census, its population was 111, in 19 families. The village is populated by Kurds.
