= Jan Jan, Ilam =

Jan Jan جانجان
- village
- Location within Iran
- Coordinates: 33°55′32″N 46°21′32″E
- Country: Iran
- Province: Ilam
- County: Chardavol
- Bakhsh: Asemanabad
- Rural District: Kol Kol

Population (2006)
  - Total: 1,048
- Time zone: UTC+3:30 (IRST)
  - Summer (DST): UTC+4:30 (IRDT)

Jan Jan (Persian: جانجان, also Romanized as Jān Jān; also known as Jājān-e Borzog and Jān Jān-e Āsmānābād) is a village in kol kol Rural District, in the Asemanabad District of Chardavol County, Ilam Province, Iran. At the 2006 census, its population was 1,048, in 229 families. The village is populated by Kurds.
