= Babamoradi-e Olya =

Babamoradi-e Olya بابامرادي عليا
- village
- Location within Iran
- Coordinates: 33°53′02″N 46°25′00″E
- Country: Iran
- Province: Ilam
- County: Chardavol
- Bakhsh: Asemanabad
- Rural District: Kol Kol

Population (2006)
  - Total: 132
- Time zone: UTC+3:30 (IRST)
  - Summer (DST): UTC+4:30 (IRDT)

Babamoradi-e Olya (Persian: بابامرادي عليا, also Romanized as Bābāmorādī-e ‘Olyā; also known as Bābāmorād-e ‘Olyā) is a village in Kol kol Rural District, in the Asemanabad District of Chardavol County, Ilam Province, Iran. At the 2006 census, its population was 132, in 20 families. The village is populated by Kurds.
