= Palkaneh =

Palkaneh (Persian: پلكانه) may refer to:

- Palkaneh, Ilam
- Palkaneh-ye Sofla, Ilam Province
- Palkaneh, Kermanshah
