= Gadmeh =

Gadmeh گدمه
- village
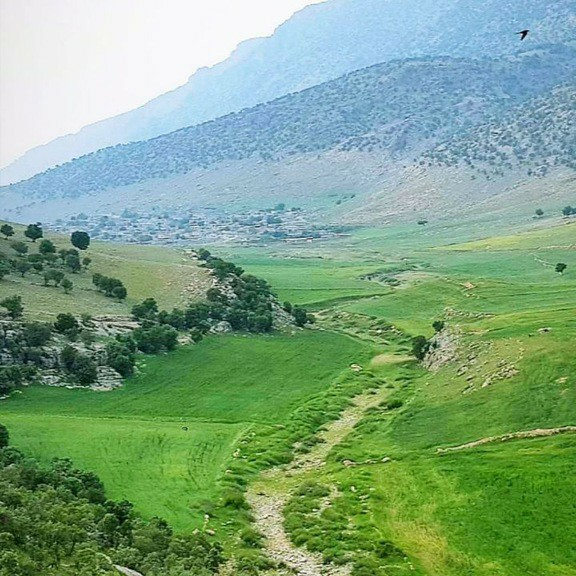

- Location within Iran
- Coordinates: 33°49′15″N 46°30′00″E
- Country: Iran
- Province: Ilam
- County: Chardavol
- Bakhsh: Asemanabad
- Rural District: Asemanabad

Population (2006)
  - Total: 686
- Time zone: UTC+3:30 (IRST)
  - Summer (DST): UTC+4:30 (IRDT)

Gadmeh (Persian: گدمه, also Romanized as Gadameh; also known as Garmeh) is a village in Asemanabad Rural District, in the Asemanabad District of Chardavol County, Ilam Province, Iran. At the 2006 census, its population was 686, in 149 families. The village is populated by Kurds.
