= Dar Eshgaft, Ilam =

Dar Eshgaft دراشگفت
- Village
- Location within Iran
- Coordinates: 33°42′19″N 46°39′03″E
- Country: Iran
- Province: Ilam
- County: Chardavol
- Bakhsh: Shabab
- Rural District: Shabab

Population (2006)
  - Total: 471
- Time zone: UTC+3:30 (IRST)
  - Summer (DST): UTC+4:30 (IRDT)

Dar Eshgaft (Persian: دراشگفت) is a village in Shabab Rural District, in the Shabab District of Chardavol County, Ilam Province, Iran. At the 2006 census, its population was 471, in 103 families. The village is majorly populated by Kurds.
