= Seyd Nazari-ye Olya =

Village in Ilam province, Iran

Seyd Nazari-ye Olya Persian: صيدنظري عليا
- Village
- Location within Iran Location within Ilam Province
- Coordinates: 33°52′20″N 46°25′41″E
- Country: Iran
- Province: Ilam
- County: Chardavol
- District: Asemanabad
- Rural District: Asemanabad

Population (2016)
  - Total: 638
- Time zone: UTC+3:30 (IRST)

Seyd Nazari-ye Olya (Persian: صيدنظري عليا) (Note: Also romanized as Şeyd Naz̧arī-ye ‘Olyā; also known as Seyyed Naz̧arī) is a village in, and the capital of, Asemanabad Rural District of Asemanabad District, Chardavol County, (Note: Formerly Shirvan and Chardavol County) Ilam province, Iran. The previous capital of the rural district was the village of Seyd Nazari-ye Sofla.

== Demographics ==
=== Ethnicity ===
The village is populated by Kurds.

=== Population ===
At the time of the 2006 National Census, the village's population was 677 in 120 households, when it was in the Central District. The following census in 2011 counted 693 people in 156 households. The 2016 census measured the population of the village as 638 people in 169 households.

After the census, the rural district was separated from the district in the formation of Asemanabad District.
