= Tohamasab-e Olya =

Coordinates: 33.8862°N 46.4174°E

Tohamasab-e Olya طهماسب عليا
- village
- Interactive map of Tohamasab-e Olya
- Country: Iran
- Province: Ilam
- County: Chardavol
- Bakhsh: Asemanabad
- Rural District: Kol Kol

Population (2006)
  - Total: 169
- Time zone: UTC+3:30 (IRST)
  - Summer (DST): UTC+4:30 (IRDT)

Tohamasab-e Olya (Persian: طهماسب عليا, also Romanized as Ţohamāsab-e ‘Olyā) is a village in Kol Kol Rural District, in the Asemanabad District of Chardavol County, Ilam Province, Iran. At the 2006 census, its population was 169, in 29 families. The village is populated by Kurds.
