= Pa-ye Takht =

Payetakht (Persian: پايتخت, meaning "capital city"), also Romanized as Paytakht, Pa-ye Takht, or Pa yi Takht, may refer to:

- Payetakht, Kerman
- Payetakht-e Golzar
- Payetakht-e Talkor
- Paytakht (TV series), Iranian TV show

== See also ==
- Pa Takht (disambiguation)
