= Zanjireh-ye Sofla =

Zanjireh-ye Sofla زنجيره سفلي
- Village
- Location within Iran
- Coordinates: 33°47′27″N 46°35′10″E
- Country: Iran
- Province: Ilam
- County: Chardavol
- Bakhsh: Shabab
- Rural District: Zanjireh

Population (2006)
  - Total: 446
- Time zone: UTC+3:30 (IRST)
  - Summer (DST): UTC+4:30 (IRDT)

Zanjireh-ye Sofla (Persian: زنجيره سفلي, also Romanized as Zanjīreh-ye Soflá; also known as Zanjīreh-ye Pā’īn) is a village in Zanjireh Rural District, in the Shabab District of Chardavol County, Ilam Province, Iran. At the 2006 census, its population was 446, in 98 families. The village is populated by Kurds.
