= Teymur Suri =

Teymur Suri (Persian: تيمورسوري) may refer to:

- Teymur Suri-ye Olya, Iran, a village
- Teymur Suri-ye Sofla, Iran, a village
