= Hareh Bagh-e Khayyat =

Hareh Bagh-e Khayyat هره باغ خياط
- Village
- Location within Iran
- Coordinates: 33°53′56″N 48°02′05″E
- Country: Iran
- Province: Lorestan
- County: Selseleh
- Bakhsh: Firuzabad
- Rural District: Firuzabad

Population (2006)
  - Total: 220
- Time zone: UTC+3:30 (IRST)
  - Summer (DST): UTC+4:30 (IRDT)

Hareh Bagh-e Khayyat (Persian: هره باغ خياط, Romanized Persian: Hareh Bāgh-e Khayyāţ; also Hareh Bāgh, Har Bāgh, Har Bāgh-e Khayyāţ, and Harreh Bāgh) is a village in Firuzabad Rural District, Firuzabad District, Selseleh County, Lorestan Province, Iran. At the 2006 census, the village's population was 220, having 46 families.
