= Cheshmeh Tala =

Cheshmeh Tala (Persian: چشمه طلا) may refer to:

- Cheshmeh Tala, Khorramabad
- Cheshmeh Tala, Selseleh
