= Kurak =

Kurak or Kūrak (Persian: كورك) may refer to:

== People ==
- Mário Kurák (born 1983), Slovak footballer
- Adam Kurak (born 1985), Russian wrestler

== Places ==
- Kurak, Tangestan, Bushehr Province, Iran
- Kurak, Fars, Iran
- Kurak, Ilam, Iran
