= Piamen =

Piamen or Piyamen (Persian: پيامن) may refer to:

- Piamen-e Olya
- Piamen-e Sofla
