= Darbid Haft Cheshmeh =

Darbid Haft Cheshmeh (Persian: داربيدهفت چشمه) may refer to:

- Darbid Haft Cheshmeh-e Olya
- Darbid Haft Cheshmeh-e Sofla
