= Tokhm-e Balut-e Sofla =

Village in Ilam, Iran

Tokhm-e Balut-e Sofla تخم بلوطسفلي
- Village
- Location within Iran
- Coordinates: 33°43′33″N 46°58′06″E
- Country: Iran
- Province: Ilam
- County: Chardavol
- Bakhsh: Helilan
- Rural District: Helilan

Population (2006)
  - Total: 468
- Time zone: UTC+3:30 (IRST)
  - Summer (DST): UTC+4:30 (IRDT)

Tokhm-e Balut-e Sofla (Persian: تخم بلوطسفلي, also Romanized as Tokhm-e Balūţ-e Soflá; also known as Varkabūd) is a village in Helilan Rural District, Helilan District, Chardavol County, Ilam Province, Iran. At the 2006 census, its population was 468, in 99 families. The village is populated by Kurds.
