= Fatemiyeh, Chardavol =

Fatemiyeh فاطميه
- village
- Country: Iran
- Province: Ilam
- County: Chardavol
- Bakhsh: Asemanabad
- Rural District: kol kol

Population (2006)
  - Total: 505
- Time zone: UTC+3:30 (IRST)
  - Summer (DST): UTC+4:30 (IRDT)

Fatemiyeh (Persian: فاطميه, also Romanized as Fāţemīyeh) is a village in Kol kol Rural District, in the Asemanabad District of Chardavol County, Ilam Province, Iran. At the 2006 census, its population was 505, in 103 families. The village is populated by Kurds.
