= Shalah Kosh =

Village in Ilam province, Iran

Shalah Kosh Persian: شله كش
- Village
- Location within Iran Location within Ilam Province
- Coordinates: 33°45′08″N 46°46′55″E
- Country: Iran
- Province: Ilam
- County: Chardavol
- District: Zagros
- Rural District: Qaleh

Population (2016)
  - Total: 773
- Time zone: UTC+3:30 (IRST)

Shalah Kosh (Persian: شله كش) (Note: Also romanized as Sholeh Kosh) is a village in, and the capital of, Qaleh Rural District of Zagros District, Chardavol County, (Note: Formerly Shirvan and Chardavol County) Ilam province, Iran.

== Demographics ==
=== Ethnicity ===
The village is populated by Kurds.

=== Population ===
At the time of the 2006 National Census, the village's population was 965 in 172 households, when it was in Bijnavand Rural District of the Central District. The following census in 2011 counted 958 people in 240 households. The 2016 census measured the population of the village as 773 people in 240 households, by which time the rural district had been separated from the district in the formation of Zagros District. Shalah Kosh was transferred to Qaleh Rural District created in the new district. It was the most populous village in its rural district.
