= Mivaleh-ye Olya =

Village in Ilam, Iran

Mivaleh-ye Olya Mivaleh
- village
- Location within Iran
- Coordinates: 33°50′43″N 46°32′07″E
- Country: Iran
- Province: Ilam
- County: Chardavol
- Bakhsh: Asemanabad
- Rural District: Kol Kol

Population (2006)
  - Total: 152
- Time zone: UTC+3:30 (IRST)
  - Summer (DST): UTC+4:30 (IRDT)

Mivaleh-ye Olya is a village in Kol Kol Rural District, in the Asemanabad District of Chardavol County, Ilam Province, Iran. At the 2001 census, its population was 152, in 29 families. The village is populated by Kurds.
