= Sang-e Sefid, Ilam =

Village in Ilam province, Iran

Sang-e Sefid Persian: سنگ سفيد
- Village
- Location within Iran Location within Ilam Province
- Coordinates: 33°43′59″N 46°40′25″E
- Country: Iran
- Province: Ilam
- County: Chardavol
- District: Shabab
- Rural District: Shabab

Population (2016)
  - Total: 460
- Time zone: UTC+3:30 (IRST)

Sang-e Sefid (Persian: سنگ سفيد) (Note: Also romanized as Sang Sefīd and Sang-e Sefīd) is a village in, and the capital of, Shabab Rural District of Shabab District, Chardavol County, (Note: Formerly Shirvan and Chardavol County) Ilam province, Iran. The previous capital of the rural district was the village of Shabab, now a city.

== Demographics ==
=== Ethnicity ===
The village is populated by Kurds.

=== Population ===
At the time of the 2006 National Census, the village's population was 442 in 94 households, when it was in the Central District. The following census in 2011 counted 444 people in 114 households. The 2016 census measured the population of the village as 460 people in 135 households, by which time the rural district had been separated from the district in the formation of Shabab District.
