= Cham Shahi =

Cham Shahi (Persian: چم شاهي) may refer to:

- Cham Shahi, Kermanshah
- Cham Shahi, Lorestan
