= Shayileh =

Shayileh شائيله
- Village
- Country: Iran
- Province: Lorestan
- County: Selseleh
- Bakhsh: Firuzabad
- Rural District: Qalayi

Population (2006)
  - Total: 30
- Time zone: UTC+3:30 (IRST)
  - Summer (DST): UTC+4:30 (IRDT)

Shayileh (Persian: شائيله, also Romanized as Shāyīleh; also known as Shāhīlān) is a village in Qalayi Rural District, Firuzabad District, Selseleh County, Lorestan Province, Iran. At the 2006 census, its population was 30, in 5 families.
