= Chal Suz =

Chal Suz چال سوز
- Village
- Location within Iran
- Coordinates: 33°45′24″N 47°59′37″E
- Country: Iran
- Province: Lorestan
- County: Selseleh
- Bakhsh: Firuzabad
- Rural District: Qalayi

Population (2006)
  - Total: 47
- Time zone: UTC+3:30 (IRST)
  - Summer (DST): UTC+4:30 (IRDT)

Chal Suz (Persian: چال سوز, also Romanized as Chāl Sūz; also known as Chāl Sabz and Chālsabz) is a village in Qalayi Rural District, Firuzabad District, Selseleh County, Lorestan Province, Iran. At the 2006 census, its population was 47, in 8 families.
