= Tokhm-e Balut-e Olya =

Tokhm-e Balut-e Olya تخم بلوطعليا
- Village
- Location within Iran
- Coordinates: 33°44′04″N 46°57′44″E
- Country: Iran
- Province: Ilam
- County: Chardavol
- Bakhsh: Helilan
- Rural District: Helilan

Population (2006)
  - Total: 641
- Time zone: UTC+3:30 (IRST)
  - Summer (DST): UTC+4:30 (IRDT)

Tokhm-e Balut-e Olya (Persian: تخم بلوطعليا, also Romanized as Tokhm-e Balūţ-e ‘Olyā; also known as Karbesāneh and Karsīāneh) is a village in Helilan Rural District, Helilan District, Chardavol County, Ilam Province, Iran. At the 2006 census, its population was 641, in 143 families. The village is populated by Kurds.
