= Mushkan =

Mushkan or Mooshkan (Persian: موشكان) may refer to:

- Mushkan, Fars
- Mushkan, Ilam
