= Darbid-e Karani =

Village in Ilam, Iran

Darbid-e Karani داربيدكرني
- Village
- Location within Iran
- Coordinates: 33°47′00″N 47°13′00″E
- Country: Iran
- Province: Ilam
- County: Chardavol
- Bakhsh: Helilan
- Rural District: Helilan

Population (2006)
  - Total: 96
- Time zone: UTC+3:30 (IRST)
  - Summer (DST): UTC+4:30 (IRDT)

Darbid-e Karani (Persian: داربيدكرني, also Romanized as Dārbīd-e Karanī) is a village in Helilan Rural District, Helilan District, Chardavol County, Ilam Province, Iran. At the 2006 census, its population was 96, in 20 families. The village is populated by Kurds.
