= Zhiryan =

Zhiryan ژيريان
- Village
- Location within Iran
- Coordinates: 33°47′16″N 48°07′45″E
- Country: Iran
- Province: Lorestan
- County: Selseleh
- Bakhsh: Firuzabad
- Rural District: Firuzabad

Population (2006)
  - Total: 244
- Time zone: UTC+3:30 (IRST)
  - Summer (DST): UTC+4:30 (IRDT)

Zhiryan (Persian: ژيريان, also Romanized as Zhīryān, Zhīrayān, Zhīrīān, Zhīzīān, Zīrīān, and Zīryān; also known as Jīrīān Gargar) is a village in Firuzabad Rural District, Firuzabad District, Selseleh County, Lorestan Province, Iran. At the 2006 census, its population was 244, in 48 families.
