= Qarib =

Qarib قريب
- Village
- Location within Iran
- Coordinates: 33°42′00″N 46°40′10″E
- Country: Iran
- Province: Ilam
- County: Chardavol
- Bakhsh: Shabab
- Rural District: Shabab

Population (2006)
  - Total: 171
- Time zone: UTC+3:30 (IRST)
  - Summer (DST): UTC+4:30 (IRDT)

Qarib (Persian: قريب, also Romanized as Qarīb; also known as Gharībī) is a village in Shabab Rural District, in the Shabab District of Chardavol County, Ilam Province, Iran. At the 2006 census, its population was 171, in 38 families. The village is populated by Kurds.
