= Tokhm-e Balut =

Tokhm-e Balut (Persian: تخم بلوط) may refer to:

- Tokhm-e Balut-e Olya
- Tokhm-e Balut-e Sofla
