= Jub Sorkh =

Jub Sorkh (Persian: جوب سرخ) may refer to:

- Jub Sorkh-e Olya
- Jub Sorkh-e Sofla
