= Dajivand Rural District =

Rural district in Ilam province, Iran

Dajivand Rural District Persian: دهستان داجیوند
- Rural District
- Location within Iran Location within Ilam Province
- Coordinates: 33°43′56″N 46°58′45″E
- Country: Iran
- Province: Ilam
- County: Holeylan
- District: Central
- Capital: Mahdiyeh
- Time zone: UTC+3:30 (IRST)

Dajivand Rural District (Persian: دهستان داجیوند) is in the Central District of Holeylan County, Ilam province, Iran. Its capital is the village of Mahdiyeh, whose population at the time of the 2016 National Census was 517 people in 143 households.

== History ==
In 2018, Holeylan District was separated from Chardavol County (Note: Formerly Shirvan and Chardavol County) in the establishment of Holeylan County, and Dajivand Rural District was created in the new Central District.
