= Baghelah-ye Olya =

Baghelah-ye Olya or Baghleh-ye Olya (Persian: باغله عليا) may refer to:

- Baghleh-ye Olya, Ilam
- Baghleh-ye Olya, Kermanshah
- Baghelah-ye Olya, Lorestan
