= Dartut, Ilam =

Dartut دارتوت
- Village
- Location within Iran
- Coordinates: 33°44′13″N 46°40′05″E
- Country: Iran
- Province: Ilam
- County: Chardavol
- Bakhsh: Shabab
- Rural District: Shabab

Population (2006)
  - Total: 121
- Time zone: UTC+3:30 (IRST)
  - Summer (DST): UTC+4:30 (IRDT)

Dartut (Persian: دارتوت, also Romanized as Dārtūt) is a village in Shabab Rural District, in the Shabab District of Chardavol County, Ilam Province, Iran. At the 2006 census, its population was 121, in 22 families. The village is populated by Kurds.
