= Bishi-ye Olya =

Village in Ilam, Iran

Bishi-ye Olya بيشي عليا
- Village
- Location within Iran
- Coordinates: 33°47′57″N 47°23′32″E
- Country: Iran
- Province: Ilam
- County: Chardavol
- Bakhsh: Helilan
- Rural District: Zardalan

Population (2006)
  - Total: 60
- Time zone: UTC+3:30 (IRST)
  - Summer (DST): UTC+4:30 (IRDT)

Bishi-ye Olya (Persian: بيشي عليا, also Romanized as Bīshī-ye ‘Olyā; also known as Bī Shī) is a village in Zardalan Rural District, Helilan District, Chardavol County, Ilam Province, Iran. At the 2006 census, its population was 60, in 11 families. The village is populated by Kurds.
