= Mahizan =

Mahizan (Persian: ماهيزان) may refer to:

- Mahizan-e Olya
- Mahizan-e Sofla
