= Tang-e Zardeh-ye Farkhinvand =

Village in Ilam, Iran

Tang-e Zardeh-ye Farkhinvand تنگ زرده فرخينوند
- Village
- Location within Iran
- Coordinates: 33°37′42″N 46°58′56″E
- Country: Iran
- Province: Ilam
- County: Chardavol
- Bakhsh: Helilan
- Rural District: Helilan

Population (2006)
  - Total: 30
- Time zone: UTC+3:30 (IRST)
  - Summer (DST): UTC+4:30 (IRDT)

Tang-e Zardeh-ye Farkhinvand (Persian: تنگ زرده فرخينوند, also Romanized as Tang-e Zardeh-ye Farkhīnvand; also known as Meleh Shotorkhān, Tang Zard, and Tang Zard-e Farkhīvand) is a village in Helilan Rural District, Helilan District, Chardavol County, Ilam Province, Iran. At the 2006 census, its population was 30, in five families. The village is populated by Kurds.
