= Bishi =

Bishi or Bi Shi may refer to:

- Bishōnen, a modern aesthetic ideal of Asian origin or a beautiful young boy
- Bishi Bhattacharya, a British musician and DJ
- Al-Bishi, Arabic family name
- Bishi, Hubei (碧石镇), town in Echeng District, Ezhou, Hubei, China
- Bishi, Miluo (弼时镇), a town in Miluo City, Hunan province.
- Bishi-ye Olya, village in Ilam Province, Iran
- Ian Bishop (cricketer) (born 1967), Trinidadian cricketer who played Tests for the West Indies, nicknamed Bishi
