= Baghleh-ye Olya, Ilam =

Baghleh-ye Olya باغله عليا
- Village
- Location within Iran
- Coordinates: 33°46′11″N 46°36′50″E
- Country: Iran
- Province: Ilam
- County: Chardavol
- Bakhsh: Shabab
- Rural District: Shabab

Population (2006)
  - Total: 239
- Time zone: UTC+3:30 (IRST)
  - Summer (DST): UTC+4:30 (IRDT)

Baghleh-ye Olya (Persian: باغله عليا, also Romanized as Bāghleh-ye ‘Olyā; also known as Bāghleh and Pā Qal‘eh-ye Bālā) is a village in Shabab Rural District, in the Shabab District of Chardavol County, Ilam Province, Iran. At the 2006 census, its population was 239, in 45 families. The village is populated by Kurds.
