= Mahizan-e Sofla =

Village in Ilam, Iran

Mahizan-e Sofla ماهيزان سفلي
- Village
- Location within Iran
- Coordinates: 33°41′39″N 47°02′51″E
- Country: Iran
- Province: Ilam
- County: Chardavol
- Bakhsh: Helilan
- Rural District: Helilan

Population (2006)
  - Total: 270
- Time zone: UTC+3:30 (IRST)
  - Summer (DST): UTC+4:30 (IRDT)

Mahizan-e Sofla (Persian: ماهيزان سفلي, also Romanized as Māhīzān-e Soflá; also known as Māhizān) is a village in Helilan Rural District, Helilan District, Chardavol County, Ilam Province, Iran. At the 2006 census, its population was 270, in 57 families. The village is populated by Laks.
