= Mahizan-e Olya =

Mahizan-e Olya ماهيزان عليا
- Village
- Location within Iran
- Coordinates: 33°42′00″N 47°02′42″E
- Country: Iran
- Province: Ilam
- County: Chardavol
- Bakhsh: Helilan
- Rural District: Helilan

Population (2006)
  - Total: 167
- Time zone: UTC+3:30 (IRST)
  - Summer (DST): UTC+4:30 (IRDT)

Mahizan-e Olya (Persian: ماهيزان عليا, also Romanized as Māhīzān-e ‘Olyā; also known as Māhīzān and) is a village in Helilan Rural District, Helilan District, Chardavol County, Ilam Province, Iran. At the 2006 census, its population was 167, in 38 families. The village is populated by Laks
