= Jub Sorkh-e Olya =

Jub Sorkh-e Olya جوب سرخ عليا
- Village
- Location within Iran
- Coordinates: 33°43′33″N 46°38′12″E
- Country: Iran
- Province: Ilam
- County: Chardavol
- Bakhsh: Shabab
- Rural District: Shabab

Population (2006)
  - Total: 338
- Time zone: UTC+3:30 (IRST)
  - Summer (DST): UTC+4:30 (IRDT)

Jub Sorkh-e Olya (Persian: جوب سرخ عليا, also Romanized as Jūb Sorkh-e ‘Olyā; also known as Tū Sorkh-e Bālā) is a village in Shabab Rural District, in the Shabab District of Chardavol County, Ilam Province, Iran. At the 2006 census, its population was 338, in 73 families. The village is populated by Kurds.
