= Chaleh Chaleh, Ilam =

Chaleh Chaleh چاله چاله
- Village
- Location within Iran
- Coordinates: 33°50′00″N 47°29′00″E
- Country: Iran
- Province: Ilam
- County: Chardavol
- Bakhsh: Helilan
- Rural District: Zardalan

Population (2006)
  - Total: 99
- Time zone: UTC+3:30 (IRST)
  - Summer (DST): UTC+4:30 (IRDT)

Chaleh Chaleh (Persian: چاله چاله, also Romanized as Chāleh Chāleh) is a village in Zardalan Rural District, Helilan District, Chardavol County, Ilam Province, Iran. At the 2006 census, its population was 99, in 19 families. The village is populated by Kurds.
