= Rumeshteh =

Rumeshteh رومشته
- Village
- Location within Iran
- Coordinates: 33°51′44″N 48°05′13″E
- Country: Iran
- Province: Lorestan
- County: Selseleh
- Bakhsh: Firuzabad
- Rural District: Firuzabad

Population (2006)
  - Total: 349
- Time zone: UTC+3:30 (IRST)
  - Summer (DST): UTC+4:30 (IRDT)

Rumeshteh (Persian: رومشته, also Romanized as Rūmeshteh, Roomooshtah, Rowmeshteh, and Rūmasheteh) is a village in Firuzabad Rural District, Firuzabad District, Selseleh County, Lorestan Province, Iran. At the 2006 census, its population was 349, in 72 families.
