= Mushkan, Ilam =

Mushkan موشكان
- Village
- Location within Iran
- Coordinates: 33°44′09″N 46°35′52″E
- Country: Iran
- Province: Ilam
- County: Chardavol
- Bakhsh: Shabab
- Rural District: Zanjireh

Population (2006)
  - Total: 196
- Time zone: UTC+3:30 (IRST)
  - Summer (DST): UTC+4:30 (IRDT)

Mushkan (Kurdish:Müşekan(مۊشەکان), also Persian as موشکان) is a village in Zanjireh Rural District, in the Shawaw District of Chardawol County, Ilam Province, Iran. At the 2006 census, its population was 196, in 45 families. The village is populated by Kurds.احسان کمرخانی
