= Patakht =

Coordinates: 33.2014°N 48.8717°E

Patakht پاتخت
- Village
- Interactive map of Patakht
- Country: Iran
- Province: Ilam
- County: Chardavol
- Bakhsh: Helilan
- Rural District: Zardalan

Population (2006)
  - Total: 176
- Time zone: UTC+3:30 (IRST)
  - Summer (DST): UTC+4:30 (IRDT)

Patakht (Persian: پاتخت, also Romanized as Pātakht) is a village in Zardalan Rural District, Helilan District, Chardavol County, Ilam Province, Iran. At the 2006 census, its population was 176, in 36 families. The village is populated by Kurds.
