= Piamen-e Sofla =

Piamen-e Sofla پيامن سفلي
- Village
- Location within Iran
- Coordinates: 33°49′18″N 47°26′37″E
- Country: Iran
- Province: Ilam
- County: Chardavol
- Bakhsh: Helilan
- Rural District: Zardalan

Population (2006)
  - Total: 93
- Time zone: UTC+3:30 (IRST)
  - Summer (DST): UTC+4:30 (IRDT)

Piamen-e Sofla (Persian: پيامن سفلي, also Romanized as Pīāmen-e Soflá) is a village in Zardalan Rural District, Helilan District, Chardavol County, Ilam Province, Iran. At the 2006 census, its population was 93, in 22 families. The village is populated by Kurds.
