= Chaleh Chaleh =

Chaleh Chaleh (Persian: چاله چاله) may refer to:

- Chaleh Chaleh, Ilam
- Chaleh Chaleh, Lorestan
