= Sar Firuzabad =

Sar Firuzabad or Sar-e Firuzabad (Persian: سرفيروزاباد) may refer to:

- Sar-e Firuzabad, Kermanshah
- Sar Firuzabad, Lorestan
- Sar Firuzabad Rural District, in Kermanshah Province
