= Tang Zard =

Tang Zard (Persian: تنگ زرد) may refer to:

- Tang Zard, Ilam
- Tang Zard, Kohgiluyeh and Boyer-Ahmad
