= Betaki =

Betaki بتکی
- Village
- Location within Iran
- Coordinates: 33°53′19″N 48°11′36″E
- Country: Iran
- Province: Lorestan
- County: Selseleh
- Bakhsh: Firuzabad
- Rural District: Firuzabad

Population (2006)
  - Total: 357
- Time zone: UTC+3:30 (IRST)
  - Summer (DST): UTC+4:30 (IRDT)

Betaki (Persian: بتکی, also Romanized as Betakī, Bateki, Botkī, Bottakī, and Būtehki) is a village in Firuzabad Rural District, Firuzabad District, Selseleh County, Lorestan Province, Iran. At the 2006 census, its population was 357, in 75 families.
