= Mivaleh =

Mivaleh (Persian: ميوله) may refer to:

- Mivaleh-ye Olya
- Mivaleh Sofla
