= Zich =

Zich (Persian: زيچ) may refer to:

- Zich, Ilam
- Zich, Lorestan
