= Darbid =

Darbid may refer to:

- Isopropamide, a drug
- Darbid, Iran (disambiguation), places in Iran
