= Adlabad, Lorestan =

Village in Lorestan province, Iran

Adlabad Persian: عدل اباد
- Village
- Location within Iran
- Coordinates: 33°48′55″N 48°00′06″E
- Country: Iran
- Province: Lorestan
- County: Selseleh
- District: Firuzabad
- Rural District: Qalayi

Population (2016)
  - Total: 614
- Time zone: UTC+3:30 (IRST)

Adlabad (Persian: عدل اباد) (Note: Also romanized as ‘Ādelābād and ‘Adlābād; formerly known as Zesht (زشت)) is a village in, and the capital of, Qalayi Rural District in Firuzabad District of Selseleh County, Lorestan province, Iran. The previous capital of the rural district was the village of Shineh.

== Demographics ==
=== Population ===
At the time of the 2006 National Census, the village's population was 639 in 138 households. The following census in 2011 counted 606 people in 160 households. The 2016 census measured the population of the village as 614 people in 181 households, the most populous in its rural district.
