= Darti =

Darti (Persian: دارتي) may refer to:

- Darti, Borujerd
- Darti, Khorramabad
