= Lalabad, Lorestan =

Village in Lorestan province, Iran

Lalabad Persian: لعل اباد
- Village
- Location within Iran
- Coordinates: 33°45′37″N 47°54′54″E
- Country: Iran
- Province: Lorestan
- County: Selseleh
- District: Firuzabad
- Rural District: Qalayi

Population (2016)
  - Total: 215
- Time zone: UTC+3:30 (IRST)

Lalabad (Persian: لعل اباد) (Note: Also romanized as La‘lābād; also known as La‘lābād-e Qalā'ī) is a village in Qalayi Rural District of Firuzabad District in Selseleh County, Lorestan province, Iran.

== Demographics ==
=== Population ===
At the time of the 2006 National Census, the village's population was 250 in 42 households. The following census in 2011 counted 217 people in 43 households. The 2016 census measured the population of the village as 215 people in 46 households.
