= Pir Mohammad Shah =

Village in Lorestan province, Iran

Pir Mohammad Shah Persian: پيرمحمدشاه
- Village
- Location within Iran
- Coordinates: 33°54′27″N 48°08′46″E
- Country: Iran
- Province: Lorestan
- County: Selseleh
- District: Firuzabad
- Rural District: Firuzabad

Population (2016)
  - Total: 508
- Time zone: UTC+3:30 (IRST)

Pir Mohammad Shah (Persian: پيرمحمدشاه) (Note: Also romanized as Pīr Moḩammad Shāh) is a village in Firuzabad Rural District of Firuzabad District in Selseleh County, Lorestan province, Iran.

== Demographics ==
=== Population ===
At the time of the 2006 National Census, the village's population was 541 in 112 households. The following census in 2011 counted 536 people in 142 households. The 2016 census measured the population of the village as 508 people in 143 households.
