= Chaleh Chaleh, Lorestan =

Chaleh Chaleh چاله چاله
- Village
- Location within Iran
- Coordinates: 33°56′02″N 48°03′51″E
- Country: Iran
- Province: Lorestan
- County: Selseleh
- Bakhsh: Firuzabad
- Rural District: Firuzabad

Population (2006)
  - Total: 81
- Time zone: UTC+3:30 (IRST)
  - Summer (DST): UTC+4:30 (IRDT)

Chaleh Chaleh (Persian: چاله چاله, also Romanized as Chāleh Chāleh; also known as Chāleh Chūleh) is a village in Firuzabad Rural District, Firuzabad District, Selseleh County, Lorestan Province, Iran. According to 2006 census, its population was 81, in 19 families.
