= Gharibi =

Gharibi may refer to:

- Milad Gharibi (b. 1992), Iranian footballer
- Gharibi, Iran, a village in Ilam Province
- Music of Tajikistan
- Gharibi (EP), a 2024 EP by Talia Lahoud
- Gharibi (Song), a 2024 song by Talia Lahoud
