= Teymur Suri-ye Sofla =

Teymur Suri-ye Sofla تيمورسوري سفلي
- Village
- Location within Iran
- Coordinates: 33°51′55″N 48°09′42″E
- Country: Iran
- Province: Lorestan
- County: Selseleh
- Bakhsh: Firuzabad
- Rural District: Firuzabad

Population (2006)
  - Total: 99
- Time zone: UTC+3:30 (IRST)
  - Summer (DST): UTC+4:30 (IRDT)

Teymur Suri-ye Sofla (Persian: تيمورسوري سفلي, also Romanized as Teymūr Sūrī-ye Soflá) is a village in Firuzabad Rural District, Firuzabad District, Selseleh County, Lorestan Province, Iran. At the 2006 census, its population was 99, in 23 families.
