= Gari Sarab =

Gari Sarab گري سراب
- village
- Location within Iran
- Coordinates: 33°21′01″N 48°30′49″E
- Country: Iran
- Province: Lorestan
- County: Khorramabad
- Bakhsh: Central
- Rural District: Kakasharaf

Population (2006)
  - Total: 56
- Time zone: UTC+3:30 (IRST)
  - Summer (DST): UTC+4:30 (IRDT)

Gari Sarab (Persian: گري سراب, also Romanized as Garī Sarāb) is a village in Kakasharaf Rural District, in the Central District of Khorramabad County, Lorestan Province, Iran. As of the 2006 census, its population was 42, in 11 families.
