= Sarab-e Sheykh Ali =

Village in Lorestan province, Iran

Sarab-e Sheykh Ali Persian: سراب شيخ عالي
- Village
- Location within Iran
- Coordinates: 33°53′48″N 48°03′00″E
- Country: Iran
- Province: Lorestan
- County: Selseleh
- District: Firuzabad
- Rural District: Firuzabad

Population (2016)
  - Total: 426
- Time zone: UTC+3:30 (IRST)

Sarab-e Sheykh Ali (Persian: سراب شيخ عالي) (Note: Also romanized as Sarāb-e Sheykh ‘Ālī; also known as Sarāb Shaikh ‘Ali) is a village in Firuzabad Rural District of Firuzabad District in Selseleh County, Lorestan province, Iran.

== Demographics ==
=== Population ===
At the time of the 2006 National Census, the village's population was 480 in 95 households. The following census in 2011 counted 445 people in 111 households. The 2016 census measured the population of the village as 426 people in 124 households.
