= Pir Mohammad Baba Hoseyn =

Pir Mohammad Baba Hoseyn پيرمحمدباباحسين
- Village
- Country: Iran
- Province: Lorestan
- County: Khorramabad
- Bakhsh: Central
- Rural District: Kakasharaf

Population (2006)
  - Total: 25
- Time zone: UTC+3:30 (IRST)
  - Summer (DST): UTC+4:30 (IRDT)

Pir Mohammad Baba Hoseyn (Persian: پيرمحمدباباحسين, also Romanized as Pīr Moḥammad Bābā Ḩoseyn) is a village in Kakasharaf Rural District, in the Central District of Khorramabad County, Lorestan Province, Iran. At the 2006 census, its population was 25, in 4 families.
