= Fatemiyeh =

Fatemiyeh (Persian: فاطميه) may refer to:

- Fatemiyeh, Ilam
- Fatemiyeh, Shirvan and Chardaval, Ilam Province
- Fatemiyeh, Shirvan, Ilam Province
- Fatemiyeh, Razavi Khorasan
