= Aslan Shahi =

Village in Lorestan province, Iran

Aslan Shahi Persian: اصلان شاهي
- Village
- Location within Iran
- Coordinates: 33°52′11″N 48°09′04″E
- Country: Iran
- Province: Lorestan
- County: Selseleh
- District: Firuzabad
- Rural District: Firuzabad

Population (2016)
  - Total: 655
- Time zone: UTC+3:30 (IRST)

Aslan Shahi (Persian: اصلان شاهي) (Note: Also romanized as Āṣlān Shāhī) is a village in Firuzabad Rural District of Firuzabad District in Selseleh County, Lorestan province, Iran.

== Demographics ==
=== Population ===
At the time of the 2006 National Census, the village's population was 718 in 156 households. The following census in 2011 counted 683 people in 180 households. The 2016 census measured the population of the village as 655 people in 200 households.
