= Palkaneh, Ilam =

Village in Ilam, Iran

Palkaneh پلكانه
- Village
- Location within Iran
- Coordinates: 33°41′41″N 46°52′24″E
- Country: Iran
- Province: Ilam
- County: Chardavol
- Bakhsh: Zagros
- Rural District: Ghaleh

Population (2006)
  - Total: 70
- Time zone: UTC+3:30 (IRST)
  - Summer (DST): UTC+4:30 (IRDT)

Palkaneh (Persian: پلكانه, also Romanized as Palkāneh; also known as Palgāneh and Palkāneh-ye ‘Olyā) is a village in Ghaleh Rural District, in the Zagros District of Chardavol County, Ilam Province, Iran. At the 2006 census, its population was 70, in 14 families. The village is populated by Kurds.
