= Shabab, Iran =

City in Ilam province, Iran

Shabab Persian: شباب
- City
- Location within Iran Location within Ilam Province
- Coordinates: 33°44′56″N 46°38′15″E
- Country: Iran
- Province: Ilam
- County: Chardavol
- District: Shabab

Population (2016)
  - Total: 4,088
- Time zone: UTC+3:30 (IRST)

Shabab (Persian: شباب) (Note: Also romanized as Shabāb; also known as Shahrak-e Shabāb) is a city in, and the capital of, Shabab District of Chardavol County, (Note: Formerly Shirvan and Chardavol County) Ilam province, Iran. As a village, it was the capital of Shabab Rural District until its capital was transferred to the village of Halesam. Its capital was once again transferred to the village of Sang-e Sefid.

== Demographics ==
=== Ethnicity ===
The city is populated by Kurds.

=== Population ===
At the time of the 2006 National Census, the city's population was 3,363 in 693 households, when it was a village in Shabab Rural District of the Central District. The following census in 2011 counted 3,801 people in 949 households. The 2016 census measured the population of the city as 4,088 people in 1,083 households, by which time the rural district had been separated from the district in the establishment of Shabab District. Shabab was elevated to the status of a city.
