= Sheykhabad-e Zangivand =

Village in Lorestan province, Iran

Sheykhabad-e Zangivand Persian: شيخ آباد زنگيوند
- Village
- Location within Iran
- Coordinates: 33°52′38″N 48°02′17″E
- Country: Iran
- Province: Lorestan
- County: Selseleh
- District: Firuzabad
- Rural District: Firuzabad

Population (2016)
  - Total: 1,058
- Time zone: UTC+3:30 (IRST)

Sheykhabad-e Zangivand (Persian: شيخ آباد زنگيوند) (Note: Also romanized as Sheykhābād-e Zangīvand; also known as Shaikhābād, Sheykhābād, and Zangīvand) is a village in Firuzabad Rural District of Firuzabad District in Selseleh County, Lorestan province, Iran.

== Demographics ==
=== Population ===
At the time of the 2006 National Census, the village's population was 1,031 in 208 households. The following census in 2011 counted 1,066 people in 266 households. The 2016 census measured the population of the village as 1,058 people in 300 households.
