= Cham Shahi, Lorestan =

Cham Shahi چم شاهي
- Village
- Location within Iran
- Coordinates: 33°47′40″N 47°53′10″E
- Country: Iran
- Province: Lorestan
- County: Selseleh
- Bakhsh: Firuzabad
- Rural District: Qalayi

Population (2006)
  - Total: 97
- Time zone: UTC+3:30 (IRST)
  - Summer (DST): UTC+4:30 (IRDT)

Cham Shahi (Persian: چم شاهي, also Romanized as Cham Shāhī) is a village in Qalayi Rural District, Firuzabad District, Selseleh County, Lorestan Province, Iran. At the 2006 census, its population was 97, in 17 families.
