= Posht-e Tang-e Firuzabad =

Posht-e Tang-e Firuzabad پشتتنگ فيروزاباد
- Village
- Location within Iran
- Coordinates: 33°55′22″N 48°05′45″E
- Country: Iran
- Province: Lorestan
- County: Selseleh
- Bakhsh: Firuzabad
- Rural District: Firuzabad

Population (2006)
  - Total: 91
- Time zone: UTC+3:30 (IRST)
  - Summer (DST): UTC+4:30 (IRDT)

Posht-e Tang-e Firuzabad (Persian: پشتتنگ فيروزاباد, also Romanized as Posht-e Tang-e Fīrūzābād and Posht Tang-e Fīrūzābād; also known as Fīrūzābād Pass, Gardaneh-ye Fīrūzābād, Gardan-i-Fīrūzābād, Ja‘farābād, and Sar Fīrūzābād) is a village in Firuzabad Rural District, Firuzabad District, Selseleh County, Lorestan Province, Iran. At the 2006 census, its population was 91, in 17 families.
