= Temeliyeh =

Village in Lorestan province, Iran

Temeliyeh Persian: تمليه
- Village
- Location within Iran
- Coordinates: 33°54′51″N 48°07′51″E
- Country: Iran
- Province: Lorestan
- County: Selseleh
- District: Firuzabad
- Rural District: Firuzabad

Population (2016)
  - Total: 1,114
- Time zone: UTC+3:30 (IRST)

Temeliyeh (Persian: تمليه) (Note: Also romanized as Tamelīyeh, Temalīyēh, Temlīyeh, and Tomelīyeh; also known as Tamīleh and Temīleh) is a village in Firuzabad Rural District of Firuzabad District in Selseleh County, Lorestan province, Iran.

== Demographics ==
=== Population ===
At the time of the 2006 National Census, the village's population was 1,340 in 1,220 households. The following census in 2011 counted 1,220 people in 310 households. The 2016 census measured the population of the village as 1,114 people in 333 households, the most populous in its rural district.
