= Cham Shateh-ye Sofla =

Cham Shateh-ye Sofla چم شته سفلي
- Village
- Location within Iran
- Coordinates: 33°47′23″N 47°53′56″E
- Country: Iran
- Province: Lorestan
- County: Selseleh
- Bakhsh: Firuzabad
- Rural District: Qalayi

Population (2006)
  - Total: 26
- Time zone: UTC+3:30 (IRST)
  - Summer (DST): UTC+4:30 (IRDT)

Cham Shateh-ye Sofla (Persian: چم شته سفلي, also romanized as Cham Shateh-ye Soflá; also known as Cham Shīneh, Shīneh, and Şaḩneh) is a village in Qalayi Rural District, Firuzabad District, Selseleh County, Lorestan Province, Iran. At the 2006 census, its population was 26, in 5 families.
