= Ab Barik-e Pain, Lorestan =

Village in Lorestan province, Iran

Ab Barik-e Pain Persian: آب باريک پايين
- Village
- Location within Iran
- Coordinates: 33°51′02″N 48°08′42″E
- Country: Iran
- Province: Lorestan
- County: Selseleh
- District: Firuzabad
- Rural District: Firuzabad

Population (2016)
  - Total: 75
- Time zone: UTC+3:30 (IRST)

Ab Barik-e Pain (Persian: آب باريک پايين) (Note: Also romanized as Āb Bārīk-e Pā’īn; formerly known as Ab Barik-e Sofla (آب باریک سفلی), also romanized as Āb Bārīk-e Soflá; also known as Āb Bārīk and Āb-i-Bārīk) is a village in Firuzabad Rural District of Firuzabad District in Selseleh County, Lorestan province, Iran.

== Demographics ==
=== Population ===
At the time of the 2006 National Census, the village's population, as Ab Barik-e Sofla, was 116 in 23 households. The following census in 2011 counted 96 people in 20 households, by which time the village was listed as Ab Barik-e Pain. The 2016 census measured the population of the village as 75 people in 19 households.
