= Palkaneh-ye Sofla =

Village in Ilam, Iran

Palkaneh-ye Sofla پلكانه سفلي
- Village
- Location within Iran
- Coordinates: 33°41′39″N 46°53′18″E
- Country: Iran
- Province: Ilam
- County: Chardavol
- Bakhsh: Zagros
- Rural District: Ghaleh

Population (2006)
  - Total: 106
- Time zone: UTC+3:30 (IRST)
  - Summer (DST): UTC+4:30 (IRDT)

Palkaneh-ye Sofla (Persian: پلكانه سفلي, also Romanized as Palkāneh-ye Soflá; also known as Palgāneh and Palkāneh) is a village in Ghaleh Rural District, in the Zagros District of Chardavol County, Ilam Province, Iran. At the 2006 census, its population was 106, in 22 families. The village is populated by Kurds.
