= Deh-e Hasanali, Lorestan =

Village in Lorestan province, Iran

Deh-e Hasanali Persian: ده حسنعلي
- Village
- Location within Iran
- Coordinates: 33°54′27″N 48°09′11″E
- Country: Iran
- Province: Lorestan
- County: Selseleh
- District: Firuzabad
- Rural District: Firuzabad

Population (2016)
  - Total: 473
- Time zone: UTC+3:30 (IRST)

Deh-e Hasanali (Persian: ده حسنعلي) (Note: Also romanized as Deh-e Ḩasan‘alī; also known as Ḩasan‘alī) is a village in Firuzabad Rural District of Firuzabad District in Selseleh County, Lorestan province, Iran.

== Demographics ==
=== Population ===
At the time of the 2006 National Census, the village's population was 552 in 122 households. The following census in 2011 counted 494 people in 128 households. The 2016 census measured the population of the village as 473 people in 139 households.
