= Varnameh =

Village in Lorestan province, Iran

Varnameh Persian: ورنمه
- Village
- Location within Iran
- Coordinates: 33°50′36″N 47°51′46″E
- Country: Iran
- Province: Lorestan
- County: Selseleh
- District: Firuzabad
- Rural District: Qalayi

Population (2016)
  - Total: 130
- Time zone: UTC+3:30 (IRST)

Varnameh (Persian: ورنمه) (Note: Also known as Varghameh) is a village in Qalayi Rural District of Firuzabad District in Selseleh County, Lorestan province, Iran.

== Demographics ==
=== Population ===
At the time of the 2006 National Census, the village's population was 149 in 29 households. The following census in 2011 counted 143 people in 28 households. The 2016 census measured the population of the village as 130 people in 26 households.
