= Zich, Ilam =

Zich زيچ
- Village
- Location within Iran
- Coordinates: 33°38′14″N 46°59′14″E
- Country: Iran
- Province: Ilam
- County: Chardavol
- Bakhsh: Zagros
- Rural District: Ghaleh

Population (2006)
  - Total: 48
- Time zone: UTC+3:30 (IRST)
  - Summer (DST): UTC+4:30 (IRDT)

Zich (Persian: زيچ, also Romanized as Zīch; also known as Zaj-e Tāzehābād and Zīj) is a village in Ghaleh Rural District, Zagros District, Chardavol County, Ilam Province, Iran. At the 2006 census, its population was 48, in 7 families. The village is populated by Kurds.
