= Ab Barik-e Bala, Lorestan =

Village in Lorestan province, Iran

Ab Barik-e Bala Persian: آب باريک بالا
- Village
- Location within Iran
- Coordinates: 33°50′29″N 48°08′22″E
- Country: Iran
- Province: Lorestan
- County: Selseleh
- District: Firuzabad
- Rural District: Firuzabad

Population (2016)
  - Total: 449
- Time zone: UTC+3:30 (IRST)

Ab Barik-e Bala (Persian: آب باريک بالا) (Note: Also romanized as Āb Bārīk-e Bālā; formerly known as Ab Barik-e Olya (آب باریک علیا), also romanized as Āb Bārīk-e ‘Olyā; also known as Āb Bārīk) is a village in Firuzabad Rural District of Firuzabad District in Selseleh County, Lorestan province, Iran.

== Demographics ==
=== Population ===
At the time of the 2006 National Census, the village's population, as Ab Barik-e Olya, was 513 in 99 households. The following census in 2011 counted 480 people in 110 households, by which time the village was listed as Ab Barik-e Bala. The 2016 census measured the population of the village as 449 people in 115 households.
