= Kurag =

Kurag كورگ
- Village
- Location within Iran
- Coordinates: 33°43′52″N 46°49′47″E
- Country: Iran
- Province: Ilam
- County: Chardavol
- Bakhsh: Zagros
- Rural District: Ghaleh

Population (2006)
  - Total: 250
- Time zone: UTC+3:30 (IRST)
  - Summer (DST): UTC+4:30 (IRDT)

Kurag (Persian: كورگ, also Romanized as Kūrag and Kūrak) is a village in Ghaleh Rural District, in the Zagros District of Chardavol County, Ilam Province, Iran. At the 2006 census, its population was 250, in 49 families. The village is populated by Kurds.
