= Seyl-e Habil =

Village in Lorestan province, Iran

Seyl-e Habil Persian: سيل هابيل
- Village
- Location within Iran
- Coordinates: 33°51′32″N 48°06′14″E
- Country: Iran
- Province: Lorestan
- County: Selseleh
- District: Firuzabad
- Rural District: Firuzabad

Population (2016)
  - Total: 411
- Time zone: UTC+3:30 (IRST)

Seyl-e Habil (Persian: سيل هابيل) (Note: Also romanized as Seyl-e Hābīl; also known as Sel Hābīl and Seyl Hābī) is a village in Firuzabad Rural District of Firuzabad District in Selseleh County, Lorestan province, Iran.

== Demographics ==
=== Population ===
At the time of the 2006 National Census, the village's population was 462 in 102 households. The following census in 2011 counted 399 people in 97 households. The 2016 census measured the population of the village as 411 people in 113 households.
