= Tappeh Dar =

Village in Lorestan province, Iran

Tappeh Dar Persian: تپه دار
- Village
- Location within Iran
- Coordinates: 33°20′56″N 48°33′33″E
- Country: Iran
- Province: Lorestan
- County: Khorramabad
- District: Central
- Rural District: Kakasharaf

Population (2016)
  - Total: 336
- Time zone: UTC+3:30 (IRST)

Tappeh Dar (Persian: تپه دار) (Note: Also romanized as Tappeh Dār) is a village in Kakasharaf Rural District of the Central District in Khorramabad County, Lorestan province, Iran.

== Demographics ==
=== Population ===
At the time of the 2006 National Census, the village's population was 389 in 65 households. The following census in 2011 counted 406 people in 92 households. The 2016 census measured the population of the village as 336 people in 92 households.
