= Pa Takht-e Do =

Pa Takht-e Do پاتخت دو
- Village
- Location within Iran
- Coordinates: 33°20′05″N 48°34′59″E
- Country: Iran
- Province: Lorestan
- County: Khorramabad
- Bakhsh: Central
- Rural District: Kakasharaf

Population (2006)
  - Total: 59
- Time zone: UTC+3:30 (IRST)
  - Summer (DST): UTC+4:30 (IRDT)

Pa Takht-e Do (Persian: پاتخت دو, also Romanized as Pā Takht-e Do, meaning "Pa Takht 2") is a village in Kakasharaf Rural District, in the Central District of Khorramabad County, Lorestan Province, Iran. At the 2006 census, its population was 59, in 9 families.
