= Nushabad, Lorestan =

Village in Lorestan province, Iran

Nushabad Persian: نوش اباد
- Village
- Location within Iran
- Coordinates: 33°19′58″N 48°34′28″E
- Country: Iran
- Province: Lorestan
- County: Khorramabad
- District: Central
- Rural District: Kakasharaf

Population (2016)
  - Total: 122
- Time zone: UTC+3:30 (IRST)

Nushabad (Persian: نوش اباد) (Note: Also romanized as Nūshābād) is a village in Kakasharaf Rural District of the Central District in Khorramabad County, Lorestan province, Iran.

== Demographics ==
=== Population ===
At the time of the 2006 National Census, the village's population was 173 in 31 households. The following census in 2011 counted 141 people in 31 households. The 2016 census measured the population of the village as 122 people in 35 households.
