= Pa Takht-e Seh =

Pa Takht-e Seh پاتخت سه
- Village
- Location within Iran
- Coordinates: 33°20′07″N 48°35′16″E
- Country: Iran
- Province: Lorestan
- County: Khorramabad
- Bakhsh: Central
- Rural District: Kakasharaf

Population (2006)
  - Total: 73
- Time zone: UTC+3:30 (IRST)
  - Summer (DST): UTC+4:30 (IRDT)

Pa Takht-e Seh (Persian: پاتخت سه, also Romanized as Pā Takht-e Seh, meaning "Pa Takht 3") is a village in Kakasharaf Rural District, in the Central District of Khorramabad County, Lorestan Province, Iran. At the 2006 census, its population was 73, in 14 families.
