= Jazman District =

District in Ilam province, Iran

Jazman District Persian: بخش جزمان
- District
- Location within Iran Location within Ilam Province
- Coordinates: 33°45′54″N 47°18′11″E
- Country: Iran
- Province: Ilam
- County: Holeylan
- Capital: Cheshmeh Mahi
- Time zone: UTC+3:30 (IRST)

Jazman District (Persian: بخش جزمان) is in Holeylan County, Ilam province, Iran. Its capital is the village of Cheshmeh Mahi, whose population at the time of the 2016 National Census was 827 in 246 households.

== History ==
In 2018, Holeylan District was separated from Chardavol County (Note: Formerly Shirvan and Chardavol County) in the establishment of Holeylan County, which was divided into two districts of two rural districts each, with Towhid as its capital and only city.

== Demographics ==
=== Administrative divisions ===
Jazman District
Administrative Divisions
Darbid RD
Zardalan RD
RD = Rural District
