= Soranjeh, Khorramabad =

Village in Lorestan province, Iran

Soranjeh Persian: سرنجه
- Village
- Location within Iran
- Coordinates: 33°19′24″N 48°29′05″E
- Country: Iran
- Province: Lorestan
- County: Khorramabad
- District: Central
- Rural District: Kakasharaf

Population (2016)
  - Total: 121
- Time zone: UTC+3:30 (IRST)

Soranjeh (Persian: سرنجه) (Note: Also romanized as Serenjeh) is a village in Kakasharaf Rural District of the Central District in Khorramabad County, Lorestan province, Iran.

== Demographics ==
=== Population ===
At the time of the 2006 National Census, the village's population was 263 in 50 households. The following census in 2011 counted 225 people in 50 households. The 2016 census measured the population of the village as 121 people in 31 households.
