= Jub Sorkh-e Sofla =

Jub Sorkh-e Sofla جوب سرخ سفلي
- Village
- Location within Iran
- Coordinates: 33°38′28″N 46°47′58″E
- Country: Iran
- Province: Ilam
- County: Chardavol
- Bakhsh: Zagros
- Rural District: Bijnavand

Population (2006)
  - Total: 118
- Time zone: UTC+3:30 (IRST)
  - Summer (DST): UTC+4:30 (IRDT)

Jub Sorkh-e Sofla (Persian: جوب سرخ سفلي, also Romanized as Jūb Sorkh-e Soflá; also known as Jū Sorkh-e Pā'īn) is a village in Bijnavand Rural District, in the Zagros District of Chardavol County, Ilam Province, Iran. At the 2006 census, its population was 118, in 28 families. The village is populated by Kurds.
