= Shineh-ye Pain =

Village in Lorestan province, Iran

Shineh-ye Pain Persian: شينه پايين
- Village
- Location within Iran
- Coordinates: 33°47′10″N 47°55′46″E
- Country: Iran
- Province: Lorestan
- County: Selseleh
- District: Firuzabad
- Rural District: Qalayi

Population (2016)
  - Total: 81
- Time zone: UTC+3:30 (IRST)

Shineh-ye Pain (Persian: شينه پايين) (Note: Also romanized as Shīneh-Pā’īn; formerly known as Shineh-ye Sofla (شينه سفلي), also romanized as Shīneh-ye Soflá) is a village in Qalayi Rural District of Firuzabad District in Selseleh County, Lorestan province, Iran.

== Demographics ==
=== Population ===
At the time of the 2006 National Census, the village's population, as Shineh-ye Sofla, was 138 in 25 households. The following census in 2011 counted 133 people in 29 households, by which time the village was listed as Shineh-ye Pain. The 2016 census measured the population of the village as 81 people in 20 households.
