= Darbid-e Pain =

Village in Lorestan province, Iran

Darbid-e Pain Persian: داربيد پايين
- Village
- Location within Iran
- Coordinates: 33°50′52″N 47°57′53″E
- Country: Iran
- Province: Lorestan
- County: Selseleh
- District: Firuzabad
- Rural District: Qalayi

Population (2016)
  - Total: 41
- Time zone: UTC+3:30 (IRST)

Darbid-e Pain (Persian: داربيد پايين) (Note: Also romanized as Dārbīd-e Pā’īn; formerly known as Darbid-e Sofla (داربيد سفلي), also romanized as Dārbīd-e Soflá; also known as Bīzhanvand-e Soflá) is a village in Qalayi Rural District of Firuzabad District in Selseleh County, Lorestan province, Iran.

== Demographics ==
=== Population ===
At the time of the 2006 National Census, the village's population, as Darbid-e Sofla, was 103 in 24 households. The following census in 2011 counted 63 people in 15 households, by which time the village was listed as Darbid-e Pain. The 2016 census measured the population of the village as 41 people in 11 households.
