= Deh Now, Kakasharaf =

Village in Lorestan province, Iran

Deh Now Persian: ده نو
- Village
- Location within Iran
- Coordinates: 33°19′56″N 48°36′13″E
- Country: Iran
- Province: Lorestan
- County: Khorramabad
- District: Central
- Rural District: Kakasharaf

Population (2016)
  - Total: 112
- Time zone: UTC+3:30 (IRST)

Deh Now (Persian: ده نو) (Note: Also romanized as Deh-e Now and Dehnow) is a village in Kakasharaf Rural District of the Central District in Khorramabad County, Lorestan province, Iran.

== Demographics ==
=== Population ===
At the time of the 2006 National Census, the village's population was 85 in 14 households. The following census in 2011 counted 99 people in 23 households. The 2016 census measured the population of the village as 112 people in 31 households.
