= Cheshmeh Tala, Khorramabad =

Cheshmeh Tala چشمه طلا
- Village
- Location within Iran
- Coordinates: 33°20′36″N 48°31′34″E
- Country: Iran
- Province: Lorestan
- County: Khorramabad
- Bakhsh: Central
- Rural District: Kakasharaf

Population (2006)
  - Total: 31
- Time zone: UTC+3:30 (IRST)
  - Summer (DST): UTC+4:30 (IRDT)

Cheshmeh Tala (Persian: چشمه طلا, also Romanized as Cheshmeh Ţalā) is a village in Kakasharaf Rural District, in the Central District of Khorramabad County, Lorestan province, Iran. At the 2006 census, its population was 31, in 8 families.
