= Firuzabad, Lorestan =

City in Lorestan province, Iran

Firuzabad Persian: فيروزآباد
- City
- Location within Iran
- Coordinates: 33°53′53″N 48°06′13″E
- Country: Iran
- Province: Lorestan
- County: Selseleh
- District: Firuzabad
- Established as a city: 1999

Population (2016)
  - Total: 3,399
- Time zone: UTC+3:30 (IRST)

Firuzabad (Persian: فيروزآباد) (Note: Also romanized as Fīrūz Ābād and Fīrūzābād) is a city in, and the capital of, Firuzabad District in Selseleh County, Lorestan province, Iran. It also serves as the administrative center for Firuzabad Rural District. The village of Firuzabad was converted to a city in 1999.

== Demographics ==
=== Population ===
At the time of the 2006 National Census, the city's population was 2,857 in 614 households. The following census in 2011 counted 2,876 people in 705 households. The 2016 census measured the population of the city as 3,399 people in 958 households.
