= Asemanabad =

City in Ilam province, Iran

Asemanabad Persian: آسمان آباد
- City
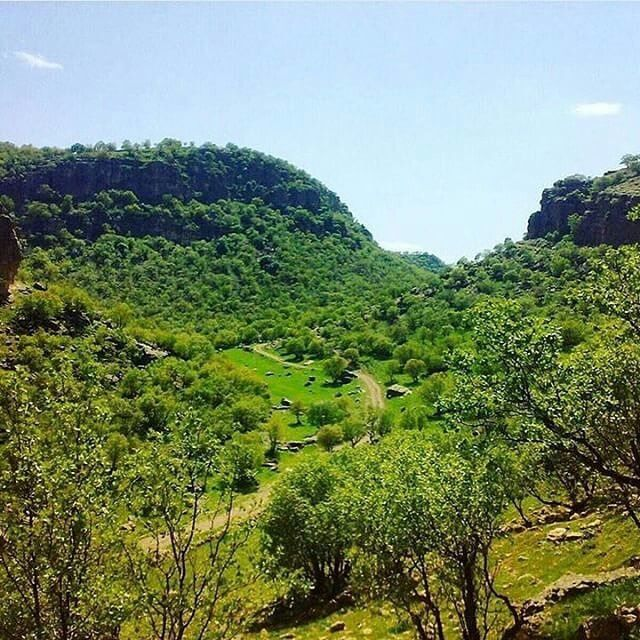
- A view of Asemamabad

- Location within Iran Location within Ilam Province
- Coordinates: 33°51′14″N 46°27′33″E
- Country: Iran
- Province: Ilam
- County: Chardavol
- District: Asemanabad

Population (2016)
  - Total: 6,280
- Time zone: UTC+3:30 (IRST)

Asemanabad (Persian: آسمان آباد) (Note: Also romanized as Āsemānābād) is a city in, and the capital of, Asemanabad District of Chardavol County, (Note: Formerly Shirvan and Chardavol County) Ilam province, Iran.

== Demographics ==
=== Ethnicity ===
The city is populated by Kurds.

=== Population ===
At the time of the 2006 National Census, the city's population was 5,899 in 1,136 households, when it was in the Central District. The following census in 2011 counted 5,889 people in 1,324 households. The 2016 census measured the population of the city as 6,280 people in 1,660 households.

After the census, the city was separated from the district in the formation of Asemanabad District.
