= Halesam Rural District =

Rural district in Ilam province, Iran

Halesam Rural District Persian: دهستان هلسم
- Rural District
- Location within Iran Location within Ilam Province
- Coordinates: 33°45′N 46°34′E
- Country: Iran
- Province: Ilam
- County: Chardavol
- District: Central
- Capital: Halesam
- Time zone: UTC+3:30 (IRST)

Halesam Rural District (Persian: دهستان هلسم) is in the Central District of Chardavol County, (Note: Formerly Shirvan and Chardavol County) Ilam province, Iran. Its capital is the village of Halesam, whose population at the time of the 2016 National Census was 494 in 140 households.

== History ==
Halesam Rural District was created in the Central District after the 2016 census.
