= Cheshmeh Ali, Lorestan =

Village in Lorestan province, Iran

Cheshmeh Ali Persian: چشمه علي
- Village
- Location within Iran
- Coordinates: 33°19′30″N 48°33′48″E
- Country: Iran
- Province: Lorestan
- County: Khorramabad
- District: Central
- Rural District: Kakasharaf

Population (2016)
  - Total: 232
- Time zone: UTC+3:30 (IRST)

Cheshmeh Ali (Persian: چشمه علي) (Note: Also romanized as Cheshmeh 'Alī) is a village in Kakasharaf Rural District of the Central District in Khorramabad County, Lorestan province, Iran.

== Demographics ==
=== Population ===
At the time of the 2006 National Census, the village's population was 314 in 50 households. The following census in 2011 counted 317 people in 70 households. The 2016 census measured the population of the village as 232 people in 54 households.
