= Deh Now Pirjed =

Village in Lorestan province, Iran

Deh Now Pirjed Persian: دهنوپيرجد
- Village
- Country: Iran
- Province: Lorestan
- County: Khorramabad
- District: Central
- Rural District: Kakasharaf

Population (2016)
  - Total: 444
- Time zone: UTC+3:30 (IRST)

Deh Now Pirjed (Persian: دهنوپيرجد) (Note: Also romanized as Deh Now Pīrjed) is a village in Kakasharaf Rural District of the Central District in Khorramabad County, Lorestan province, Iran.

== Demographics ==
=== Population ===
At the time of the 2006 National Census, the village's population was 762 in 169 households. The following census in 2011 counted 692 people in 151 households. The 2016 census measured the population of the village as 444 people in 112 households.
