= Darbid-e Vosta =

Village in Lorestan province, Iran

Darbid-e Vosta Persian: داربيد وسطي
- Village
- Location within Iran
- Coordinates: 33°50′49″N 47°58′18″E
- Country: Iran
- Province: Lorestan
- County: Selseleh
- District: Firuzabad
- Rural District: Qalayi

Population (2016)
  - Total: 125
- Time zone: UTC+3:30 (IRST)

Darbid-e Vosta (Persian: داربيد وسطي) (Note: Also romanized as Dārbīd-e Vosţá) is a village in Qalayi Rural District of Firuzabad District in Selseleh County, Lorestan province, Iran.

== Demographics ==
=== Population ===
At the time of the 2006 National Census, the village's population was 91 in 20 households. The following census in 2011 counted 99 people in 28 households. The 2016 census measured the population of the village as 125 people in 34 households.
