= Zanjireh Rural District =

Rural district in Ilam province, Iran

Zanjireh Rural District Persian: دهستان زنجیره
- Rural District
- Location within Iran Location within Ilam Province
- Coordinates: 33°46′39″N 46°35′13″E
- Country: Iran
- Province: Ilam
- County: Chardavol
- District: Shabab
- Capital: Zanjireh-ye Olya

Population (2016)
  - Total: 3,984
- Time zone: UTC+3:30 (IRST)

Zanjireh Rural District (Persian: دهستان زنجیره) is in Shabab District of Chardavol County, (Note: Formerly Shirvan and Chardavol County) Ilam province, Iran. Its capital is the village of Zanjireh-ye Olya.

== History ==
After the 2011 National Census, Shabab Rural District was separated from the Central District in the formation of Shabab District, and Zanjireh Rural District was created in the new district.

== Demographics ==
=== Population ===
At the time of the 2016 census, the rural district's population was 3,984 in 1,157 households. The most populous of its eight villages was Zanjireh-ye Olya, with 2,724 people.
