= Darbid Rural District (Holeylan County) =

Rural district in Ilam province, Iran

Darbid Rural District Persian: دهستان داربید
- Rural District
- Location within Iran Location within Ilam Province
- Coordinates: 33°45′34″N 47°10′42″E
- Country: Iran
- Province: Ilam
- County: Holeylan
- District: Jazman
- Capital: Sarcham
- Time zone: UTC+3:30 (IRST)

Darbid Rural District (Persian: دهستان داربید) is in Jazman District of Holeylan County, Ilam province, Iran. Its capital is the village of Sarcham, whose population at the time of the 2016 National Census was 520 in 137 households.

== History ==
In 2018, Holeylan District was separated from Chardavol County (Note: Formerly Shirvan and Chardavol County) in the establishment of Holeylan County, and Darbid Rural District was created in the new Jazman District.
