= Cheshmeh Tala, Selseleh =

Village in Lorestan province, Iran

Cheshmeh Tala Persian: چشمه طلا
- Village
- Location within Iran
- Coordinates: 33°46′45″N 47°55′07″E
- Country: Iran
- Province: Lorestan
- County: Selseleh
- District: Firuzabad
- Rural District: Qalayi

Population (2016)
  - Total: 203
- Time zone: UTC+3:30 (IRST)

Cheshmeh Tala (Persian: چشمه طلا) (Note: Also romanized as Cheshmeh Ţalā) is a village in Qalayi Rural District of Firuzabad District in Selseleh County, Lorestan province, Iran.

== Demographics ==
=== Population ===
At the time of the 2006 National Census, the village's population was 243 in 46 households. The following census in 2011 counted 221 people in 46 households. The 2016 census measured the population of the village as 203 people in 49 households.
