= Darbid-e Bala =

Village in Lorestan province, Iran

Darbid-e Bala Persian: داربيد بالا
- Village
- Location within Iran
- Coordinates: 33°50′14″N 47°58′48″E
- Country: Iran
- Province: Lorestan
- County: Selseleh
- District: Firuzabad
- Rural District: Qalayi

Population (2016)
  - Total: 275
- Time zone: UTC+3:30 (IRST)

Darbid-e Bala (Persian: داربيد بالا) (Note: Also romanized as Dārbīd-e Bālā; formerly known as Darbid-e Olya (داربيد عليا), also romanized as Dārbīd-e 'Olyā) is a village in Qalayi Rural District of Firuzabad District in Selseleh County, Lorestan province, Iran.

== Demographics ==
=== Population ===
At the time of the 2006 National Census, the village's population, as Darbid-e Olya, was 255 in 58 households. The following census in 2011 counted 250 people in 60 households, by which time the village was listed as Darbid-e Bala. The 2016 census measured the population of the village as 275 people in 69 households.
