= Shineh-ye Bala =

Village in Lorestan province, Iran

Shineh-ye Bala Persian: شينه بالا
- Village
- Location within Iran
- Coordinates: 33°47′32″N 47°55′54″E
- Country: Iran
- Province: Lorestan
- County: Selseleh
- District: Firuzabad
- Rural District: Qalayi

Population (2016)
  - Total: 238
- Time zone: UTC+3:30 (IRST)

Shineh-ye Bala (Persian: شينه بالا) (Note: Also romanized as Shīneh-ye Bālā; formerly known as Shineh-ye Olya (شينه عليا), also romanized as Shīneh-ye ‘Olyā) is a village in Qalayi Rural District of Firuzabad District in Selseleh County, Lorestan province, Iran.

== Demographics ==
=== Population ===
At the time of the 2006 National Census, the village's population, as Shineh-ye Olya, was 177 in 36 households. The following census in 2011 counted 154 people in 40 households, by which time the village was listed as Shineh-ye Bala. The 2016 census measured the population of the village as 238 people in 63 households.
