= Dartut-e Rahim =

Dartut-e Rahim دارتوت رحيم
- Village
- Location within Iran
- Coordinates: 34°21′42″N 45°56′40″E
- Country: Iran
- Province: Kermanshah
- County: Gilan-e Gharb
- Bakhsh: Central
- Rural District: Howmeh

Population (2006)
  - Total: 41
- Time zone: UTC+3:30 (IRST)
  - Summer (DST): UTC+4:30 (IRDT)

Dartut-e Rahim (Persian: دارتوت رحيم, also Romanized as Dārtūt-e Raḥīm; also known as Dārtūt) is a village in Howmeh Rural District, in the Central District of Gilan-e Gharb County, Kermanshah Province, Iran. At the 2006 census, its population was 41, in 8 families.
