= Pirijed =

Pirijed پيري جد
- Village
- Location within Iran
- Coordinates: 33°36′40″N 48°16′13″E
- Country: Iran
- Province: Lorestan
- County: Khorramabad
- Bakhsh: Central
- Rural District: Robat

Population (2006)
  - Total: 102
- Time zone: UTC+3:30 (IRST)
  - Summer (DST): UTC+4:30 (IRDT)

Pirijed (Persian: پيري جد, also Romanized as Pīrījed; also known as Pīr Jad, Pīr Jād, and Tang-e Parījeh) is a village in Robat Rural District, in the Central District of Khorramabad County, Lorestan Province, Iran. At the 2006 census, its population was 102, in 22 families.
