= Towhid =

City in Ilam province, Iran

Towhid Persian: توحید
- City
- Location within Iran Location within Ilam Province
- Coordinates: 33°43′34″N 47°04′01″E
- Country: Iran
- Province: Ilam
- County: Holeylan
- District: Central

Population (2016)
  - Total: 2,128
- Time zone: UTC+3:30 (IRST)

Towhid (Persian: توحید) (Note: Also romanized as Towḥīd) is a city in the Central District of Holeylan County, Ilam province, Iran, serving as capital of both the county and the district. As a village, it was the capital of Holeylan Rural District (Note: Renamed Guran Rural District) until its capital was transferred to the village of Kahreh. Its capital has been transferred once again, to the village of Shiravand.

== Demographics ==
=== Ethnicity ===
The city is populated by Laks.

=== Population ===
At the time of the 2006 National Census, the city's population was 604 in 132 households, when it was capital of the former Holeylan District of Chardavol County. (Note: Formerly Shirvan and Chardavol County) The following census in 2011 counted 1,475 people in 375 households. The 2016 census measured the population of the city as 2,128 people in 601 households.

In 2018, the district was separated from the county in the establishment of Holeylan County, and Towhid was transferred to the new Central District as the county's capital.
