= Pirjad-e Pain =

Pirjad-e Pain پيرجدپايين
- Village
- Location within Iran
- Coordinates: 33°19′40″N 48°28′29″E
- Country: Iran
- Province: Lorestan
- County: Khorramabad
- Bakhsh: Central
- Rural District: Koregah-e Sharqi

Population (2006)
  - Total: 107
- Time zone: UTC+3:30 (IRST)
  - Summer (DST): UTC+4:30 (IRDT)

Pirjad-e Pain (Persian: پيرجدپايين, also Romanized as Pīrjad-e Pā’īn; also known as Pīrjed, Pīrjerd, and Pīr Jad) is a village in Koregah-e Sharqi Rural District, in the Central District of Khorramabad County, Lorestan Province, Iran. At the 2006 census, its population was 107, in 24 families.
