= Shineh, Kurdistan =

Shineh شينه
- Village
- Location within Iran
- Coordinates: 35°08′05″N 46°59′29″E
- Country: Iran
- Province: Kurdistan
- County: Sanandaj
- Bakhsh: Central
- Rural District: Naran

Population (2006)
  - Total: 110
- Time zone: UTC+3:30 (IRST)
  - Summer (DST): UTC+4:30 (IRDT)

Shineh (Persian: شينه, also Romanized as Shīneh) is a village in Naran Rural District, in the Central District of Sanandaj County, Kurdistan Province, Iran. At the 2006 census, its population was 110, in 25 families. The village is populated by Kurds.
