= Mushkan, Fars =

Mushkan موشكان
- Village
- Location within Iran
- Coordinates: 28°49′33″N 52°27′56″E
- Country: Iran
- Province: Fars
- County: Firuzabad
- Bakhsh: Central
- Rural District: Ahmadabad

Population (2006)
  - Total: 532
- Time zone: UTC+3:30 (IRST)
  - Summer (DST): UTC+4:30 (IRDT)

Mushkan (Persian: موشكان, also Romanized as Mūshkān and Mooshakan; also known as Mūshgān) is a village in Ahmadabad Rural District, in the Central District of Firuzabad County, Fars province, Iran. At the 2006 census, its population was 532, in 124 families.
