= Payetakht-e Talkor =

Pa-ye Takht-e Talkor پایتخت تل‌کر
- Village
- Location within Iran
- Coordinates: 32°48′49″N 48°24′48″E
- Country: Iran
- Province: Khuzestan
- County: Andimeshk
- Bakhsh: Alvar-e Garmsiri
- Rural District: Qilab

Population (2006)
  - Total: 69
- Time zone: UTC+3:30 (IRST)
  - Summer (DST): UTC+4:30 (IRDT)

Pa-ye Takht-e Talkor (Persian: پایتخت تل‌کر, also Romanized as Pā-ye Takht-e Talkor; also known as Pātakht, Pāyetakht, and Pāytakht) is a village in Qilab Rural District, Alvar-e Garmsiri District, Andimeshk County, Khuzestan Province, Iran. At the 2006 census, its population was 69, in 11 families.
