= Sarableh =

City in Ilam province, Iran

Sarableh Persian: سرابله
- City
- Location within Iran Location within Ilam Province
- Coordinates: 33°46′06″N 46°33′43″E
- Country: Iran
- Province: Ilam
- County: Chardavol
- District: Central

Population (2016)
  - Total: 12,393
- Time zone: UTC+3:30 (IRST)

Sarableh (Persian: سرابله) (Note: Also romanized as Sar Ābleh) is a city in the Central District of Chardavol County, (Note: Formerly Shirvan and Chardavol County) Ilam province, Iran, serving as capital of both the county and the district.

== Demographics ==
=== Ethnicity ===
The city is populated by Kurds.

=== Population ===
At the time of the 2006 National Census, the city's population was 9,703 in 2,079 households. The following census in 2011 counted 10,967 people in 2,762 households. The 2016 census measured the population of the city as 12,393 people in 3,417 households.
