= Pay Taq =

Pay Taq پاي طاق
- Village
- Location within Iran
- Coordinates: 29°17′27″N 57°07′25″E
- Country: Iran
- Province: Kerman
- County: Rabor
- Bakhsh: Hanza
- Rural District: Hanza

Population (2006)
  - Total: 22
- Time zone: UTC+3:30 (IRST)
  - Summer (DST): UTC+4:30 (IRDT)

Pay Taq (Persian: پاي طاق, also Romanized as Pāy Ţāq; also known as Pā-ye Takht and Pa yi Takht) is a village in Hanza Rural District, Hanza District, Rabor County, Kerman Province, Iran. At the 2006 census, its population was 22, in 5 families.
