= Dar Tut, Kurdistan =

Dar Tut دارتوت
- Village
- Location within Iran
- Coordinates: 34°46′41″N 47°00′45″E
- Country: Iran
- Province: Kurdistan
- County: Kamyaran
- Bakhsh: Central
- Rural District: Bilavar

Population (2006)
  - Total: 43
- Time zone: UTC+3:30 (IRST)
  - Summer (DST): UTC+4:30 (IRDT)

Dar Tut (Persian: دارتوت, also Romanized as Dār Tūt) is a village in Bilavar Rural District, in the Central District of Kamyaran County, Kurdistan Province, Iran. At the 2006 census, its population was 43, in 10 families. The village is populated by Kurds.
