= Payetakht-e Golzar =

Pa-ye Takht-e Golzar پایتخت گلزار
- Village
- Location within Iran
- Coordinates: 32°50′49″N 48°22′58″E
- Country: Iran
- Province: Khuzestan
- County: Andimeshk
- Bakhsh: Alvar-e Garmsiri
- Rural District: Qilab

Population (2006)
  - Total: 143
- Time zone: UTC+3:30 (IRST)
  - Summer (DST): UTC+4:30 (IRDT)

Pa-ye Takht-e Golzar (Persian: پایتخت گلزار, also Romanized as 'Pā-ye Takht-e Golzār; also known as Takht-e Golzār) is a village in Qilab Rural District, Alvar-e Garmsiri District, Andimeshk County, Khuzestan Province, Iran. At the 2006 census, its population was 143, in 24 families.
