= Zich, Lorestan =

Zich زچ
- Village
- Location within Iran
- Coordinates: 34°03′00″N 47°38′00″E
- Country: Iran
- Province: Lorestan
- County: Delfan
- Bakhsh: Kakavand
- Rural District: Kakavand-e Gharbi

Population (2006)
  - Total: 68
- Time zone: UTC+3:30 (IRST)
  - Summer (DST): UTC+4:30 (IRDT)

Zich (Persian: زچ, also Romanized as Zej; also known as Zej-e Pā’īn) is a village in Kakavand-e Gharbi Rural District, Kakavand District, Delfan County, Lorestan Province, Iran. At the 2006 census, its population was 68, in 9 families.
