= Mivaleh Sofla =

Mivaleh Sofla ميوله سفلي
- Village
- Location within Iran
- Coordinates: 33°45′56″N 48°07′02″E
- Country: Iran
- Province: Lorestan
- County: Selseleh
- Bakhsh: Central
- Rural District: Doab

Population (2006)
  - Total: 31
- Time zone: UTC+3:30 (IRST)
  - Summer (DST): UTC+4:30 (IRDT)

Mivaleh Sofla (Persian: ميوله سفلي, also Romanized as Mīvaleh Soflá; also known as Mīvaleh and Mīsūleh) is a village in Doab Rural District, in the Central District of Selseleh County, Lorestan Province, Iran. At the 2006 census, its population was 31, in 9 families.
