= Baqeleh-ye Olya =

Baqeleh-ye Olya باقله عليا
- Village
- Location within Iran
- Coordinates: 34°53′02″N 47°07′04″E
- Country: Iran
- Province: Kermanshah
- County: Sonqor
- Bakhsh: Kolyai
- Rural District: Kivanat

Population (2006)
  - Total: 118
- Time zone: UTC+3:30 (IRST)
  - Summer (DST): UTC+4:30 (IRDT)

Baqeleh-ye Olya (Persian: باقله عليا, also Romanized as Bāqeleh-ye ‘Olyā; also known as Bāghleh-ye Bālā, Bāghleh-ye ‘Olyā, Bāqeleh-ye Bālā, and Gāgheleh-ye Bālā) is a village in Kivanat Rural District, Kolyai District, Sonqor County, Kermanshah Province, Iran. At the 2006 census, its population was 118, in 22 families.
