= Shineh-ye Sharifabad =

Shineh-ye Sharifabad شينه شريف آباد
- Village
- Country: Iran
- Province: Kurdistan
- County: Sanandaj
- Bakhsh: Central
- Rural District: Naran

Population (2006)
  - Total: 58
- Time zone: UTC+3:30 (IRST)
  - Summer (DST): UTC+4:30 (IRDT)

Shineh-ye Sharifabad (Persian: شينه شريف آباد, also Romanized as Shīneh-ye Sharīfābād) is a village in Naran Rural District, in the Central District of Sanandaj County, Kurdistan Province, Iran. At the 2006 census, its population was 58, in 11 families. The village is populated by Kurds.
