= Al-Bishi =

Al-Bishi (Arabic: البيشي) is an Arabic family name.

== People ==
- Abdulrahman Al-Bishi, Saudi footballer
- Fahad Al-Bishi, Saudi footballer
- Hamdan Al-Bishi, Saudi athlete
- Hamed Al-Bishi, Saudi athlete
- Mohamed Al-Bishi, Saudi footballer
- Sultan Al-Bishi, Saudi footballer
