= Tang Zard-e Gelal =

Tang Zard-e Gelal تنگ زردگلال
- Village
- Location within Iran
- Coordinates: 30°55′35″N 50°32′57″E
- Country: Iran
- Province: Kohgiluyeh and Boyer-Ahmad
- County: Boyer-Ahmad
- Bakhsh: Ludab
- Rural District: Chin

Population (2006)
  - Total: 27
- Time zone: UTC+3:30 (IRST)
  - Summer (DST): UTC+4:30 (IRDT)

Tang Zard-e Gelal (Persian: تنگ زردگلال, also Romanized as Tang Zard-e Gelāl; also known as Tang Zard) is a village in Chin Rural District, Ludab District, Boyer-Ahmad County, Kohgiluyeh and Boyer-Ahmad Province, Iran. At the 2006 census, its population was 27, in 5 families.
