= Pirjed =

Village in Lorestan province, Iran

Pirjed Persian: پيرجد
- Village
- Location within Iran
- Coordinates: 33°19′39″N 48°28′34″E
- Country: Iran
- Province: Lorestan
- County: Khorramabad
- District: Central
- Rural District: Kakasharaf

Population (2016)
  - Total: 471
- Time zone: UTC+3:30 (IRST)

Pirjed (Persian: پيرجد) (Note: Also romanized as Pīr Jad and Pīrjed; also known as Pīrjad-e Pā’īn and Pīrjerd) is a village in Kakasharaf Rural District of the Central District in Khorramabad County, Lorestan province, Iran.

== Demographics ==
=== Population ===
At the time of the 2006 National Census, the village's population was 691 in 131 households. The following census in 2011 counted 592 people in 127 households. The 2016 census measured the population of the village as 471 people in 128 households, the most populous in its rural district.
