= Palkaneh, Kermanshah =

Palkaneh پلكانه
- Village
- Location within Iran
- Coordinates: 33°50′41″N 47°10′28″E
- Country: Iran
- Province: Kermanshah
- County: Kermanshah
- Bakhsh: Firuzabad
- Rural District: Osmanvand

Population (2006)
  - Total: 117
- Time zone: UTC+3:30 (IRST)
  - Summer (DST): UTC+4:30 (IRDT)

Palkaneh (Persian: پلكانه, also Romanized as Palkāneh) is a village in Osmanvand Rural District, Firuzabad District, Kermanshah County, Kermanshah Province, Iran. At the 2006 census, its population was 117, in 24 families.
