= Cham Shahi, Kermanshah =

Cham Shahi چم شاهي
- Village
- Location within Iran
- Coordinates: 34°08′27″N 47°23′42″E
- Country: Iran
- Province: Kermanshah
- County: Harsin
- Bakhsh: Central
- Rural District: Cheshmeh Kabud

Population (2006)
  - Total: 46
- Time zone: UTC+3:30 (IRST)
  - Summer (DST): UTC+4:30 (IRDT)

Cham Shahi (Persian: چم شاهي, also Romanized as Cham Shāhī) is a village in Cheshmeh Kabud Rural District, in the Central District of Harsin County, Kermanshah Province, Iran. At the 2006 census, its population was 46, in 10 families.
