= Sarab-e Sar Firuzabad =

Village in Kermanshah, Iran

Sarab-e Sar Firuzabad سراب سرفيروزاباد
- Village
- Location within Iran
- Coordinates: 34°03′36″N 47°16′45″E
- Country: Iran
- Province: Kermanshah
- County: Kermanshah
- Bakhsh: Firuzabad
- Rural District: Sar Firuzabad

Population (2006)
  - Total: 941
- Time zone: UTC+3:30 (IRST)
  - Summer (DST): UTC+4:30 (IRDT)

Sarab-e Sar Firuzabad (Persian: سراب سرفيروزاباد, also Romanized as Sarāb-e Sar Fīrūzābād; also known as Sarāb, Sarāb-e Fīrūzābād, Sarāb-e Soflá, Sar-e Fīrūzābād, and Sar-i-Āb-i-Fīrūzābād) is a village in Sar Firuzabad Rural District, Firuzabad District, Kermanshah County, Kermanshah Province, Iran. At the 2006 census, its population was 941, in 179 families.
