= Dartut-e Movvali =

Dartut-e Movvali دارتوت موالي
- Village
- Country: Iran
- Province: Kermanshah
- County: Salas-e Babajani
- Bakhsh: Ozgoleh
- Rural District: Jeygaran

Population (2006)
  - Total: 153
- Time zone: UTC+3:30 (IRST)
  - Summer (DST): UTC+4:30 (IRDT)

Dartut-e Movvali (Persian: دارتوت موالي, also Romanized as Dārtūt-e Movvālī) is a village in Jeygaran Rural District, Ozgoleh District, Salas-e Babajani County, Kermanshah Province, Iran. At the 2006 census, its population was 153, in 27 families.
