= Dartut, Kermanshah =

Dartut دارتوت
- Village
- Location within Iran
- Coordinates: 34°10′42″N 45°53′43″E
- Country: Iran
- Province: Kermanshah
- County: Sarpol-e Zahab
- Bakhsh: Central
- Rural District: Qaleh Shahin

Population (2006)
  - Total: 538
- Time zone: UTC+3:30 (IRST)
  - Summer (DST): UTC+4:30 (IRDT)

Dartut (Persian: دارتوت, also Romanized as Dārtūt; also known as Dāreh Tūt and Dārtūt-e Gorāzān) is a village in Qaleh Shahin Rural District, in the Central District of Sarpol-e Zahab County, Kermanshah Province, Iran. At the 2006 census, its population was 538, in 138 families.
