= Darbid-e Ali Akbar =

Darbid-e Ali Akbar داربيدعلي اكبر
- Village
- Country: Iran
- Province: Kermanshah
- County: Gilan-e Gharb
- Bakhsh: Central
- Rural District: Vizhenan

Population (2006)
  - Total: 21
- Time zone: UTC+3:30 (IRST)
  - Summer (DST): UTC+4:30 (IRDT)

Darbid-e Ali Akbar (Persian: داربيدعلي اكبر, also Romanized as Dārbīd-e ʿAlī Akbar) is a village in Vizhenan Rural District, in the Central District of Gilan-e Gharb County, Kermanshah Province, Iran. At the 2006 census, its population was 21, in 6 families.
