= Asemanabad Rural District =

Rural district in Ilam province, Iran

Asemanabad Rural District Persian: دهستان آسمان آباد
- Rural District
- Location within Iran Location within Ilam Province
- Coordinates: 33°50′N 46°28′E
- Country: Iran
- Province: Ilam
- County: Chardavol
- District: Asemanabad
- Capital: Seyd Nazari-ye Olya

Population (2016)
  - Total: 5,895
- Time zone: UTC+3:30 (IRST)

Asemanabad Rural District (Persian: دهستان آسمان آباد) is in Asemanabad District of Chardavol County, (Note: Formerly Shirvan and Chardavol County) Ilam province, Iran. Its capital is the village of Seyd Nazari-ye Olya. The previous capital of the rural district was the village of Seyd Nazari-ye Sofla.

== Demographics ==
=== Population ===
At the time of the 2006 National Census, the rural district's population (as a part of the Central District) was 6,411 in 1,270 households. There were 6,275 inhabitants in 1,480 households at the following census of 2011. The 2016 census measured the population of the rural district as 5,895 in 1,660 households. The most populous of its 21 villages was Kol Kol-e Olya, with 1,576 people.

After the census, the rural district was separated from the district in the formation of Asemanabad District.
