= Central District (Holeylan County) =

District in Ilam province, Iran

Central District (Holeylan County) Persian: بخش مرکزی شهرستان هلیلان
- District
- Location within Iran Location within Ilam Province
- Coordinates: 33°44′49″N 47°00′52″E
- Country: Iran
- Province: Ilam
- County: Holeylan
- Capital: Towhid
- Time zone: UTC+3:30 (IRST)

The Central District of Holeylan County (Persian: بخش مرکزی شهرستان هلیلان) is in Ilam province, Iran. Its capital is the city of Towhid, whose population at the time of the 2016 National Census was 2,128 in 601 households.

== History ==
In 2018, Holeylan District was separated from Chardavol County (Note: Formerly Shirvan and Chardavol County) in the establishment of Holeylan County, which was divided into two districts of two rural districts each, with Towhid as its capital and only city.

== Demographics ==
=== Administrative divisions ===
Central District (Holeylan County)
Administrative Divisions
Dajivand RD
Guran RD (Note: Formerly Holeylan Rural District)
Towhid (city)
RD = Rural District
