= Darti, Khorramabad =

Darti دارتي
- Village
- Location within Iran
- Coordinates: 33°29′22″N 48°14′23″E
- Country: Iran
- Province: Lorestan
- County: Khorramabad
- Bakhsh: Central
- Rural District: Koregah-e Gharbi

Population (2006)
  - Total: 42
- Time zone: UTC+3:30 (IRST)
  - Summer (DST): UTC+4:30 (IRDT)

Darti (Persian: دارتي, also Romanized as Dārtī; also known as Dārtūt) is a village in Koregah-e Gharbi Rural District, in the Central District of Khorramabad County, Lorestan Province, Iran. At the 2006 census, its population was 42, in 10 families.
