= Darbid Haft Cheshmeh-e Sofla =

Darbid Haft Cheshmeh-e Sofla داربيد هفت چشمه سفلي
- Village
- Location within Iran
- Coordinates: 34°12′59″N 47°45′35″E
- Country: Iran
- Province: Lorestan
- County: Delfan
- Bakhsh: Kakavand
- Rural District: Kakavand-e Sharqi

Population (2006)
  - Total: 69
- Time zone: UTC+3:30 (IRST)
  - Summer (DST): UTC+4:30 (IRDT)

Darbid Haft Cheshmeh-e Sofla (Persian: داربيد هفت چشمه سفلي, also Romanized as Dārbīd Haft Cheshmeh-e Soflá; also known as Dārbīd-e Soflá) is a village in Kakavand-e Sharqi Rural District, Kakavand District, Delfan County, Lorestan Province, Iran. At the 2006 census, its population was 69, in 13 families.
