= Darbid Haft Cheshmeh-e Olya =

Darbid Haft Cheshmeh-e Olya داربيدهفت چشمه عليا
- Village
- Location within Iran
- Coordinates: 34°13′10″N 47°45′37″E
- Country: Iran
- Province: Lorestan
- County: Delfan
- Bakhsh: Kakavand
- Rural District: Kakavand-e Sharqi

Population (2006)
  - Total: 55
- Time zone: UTC+3:30 (IRST)
  - Summer (DST): UTC+4:30 (IRDT)

Darbid Haft Cheshmeh-e Olya (Persian: داربيدهفت چشمه عليا, also Romanized as Dārbīd Haft Cheshmeh-e 'Olyā; also known as Dārbīd-e 'Olyā) is a village in Kakavand-e Sharqi Rural District, Kakavand District, Delfan County, Lorestan province, Iran. At the 2006 census, its population was 55, in 13 families.
