= Qaleh Rural District (Chardavol County) =

Rural district in Ilam province, Iran

Qaleh Rural District Persian: دهستان قلعه
- Rural District
- Location within Iran Location within Ilam Province
- Coordinates: 33°42′N 46°53′E
- Country: Iran
- Province: Ilam
- County: Chardavol
- District: Zagros
- Capital: Shalah Kosh

Population (2016)
  - Total: 1,937
- Time zone: UTC+3:30 (IRST)

Qaleh Rural District (Persian: دهستان قلعه) is in Zagros District of Chardavol County, (Note: Formerly Shirvan and Chardavol County) Ilam province, Iran. Its capital is the village of Shalah Kosh.

== History ==
After the 2011 National Census, Bijnavand Rural District was separated from the Central District in the formation of Zagros District, and Qaleh Rural District was created in the new district.

== Demographics ==
=== Population ===
At the time of the 2016 census, the rural district's population was 1,937 in 577 households. The most populous of its 17 villages was Shalah Kosh, with 773 people.
