= Qalayi Rural District =

Rural district in Lorestan province, Iran

Qalayi Rural District Persian: دهستان قلائي
- Rural District
- Location within Iran
- Coordinates: 33°46′N 47°54′E
- Country: Iran
- Province: Lorestan
- County: Selseleh
- District: Firuzabad
- Established: 1987
- Capital: Adlabad

Population (2016)
  - Total: 2,677
- Time zone: UTC+3:30 (IRST)

Qalayi Rural District (Persian: دهستان قلائي) is in Firuzabad District of Selseleh County, Lorestan province, Iran. Its capital is the village of Adlabad. The previous capital of the rural district was the village of Shineh.

== Demographics ==
=== Population ===
At the time of the 2006 National Census, the rural district's population was 2,841 in 575 households. There were 2,593 inhabitants in 606 households at the following census of 2011. The 2016 census measured the population of the rural district as 2,677 in 684 households. The most populous of its 34 villages was Adlabad, with 614 people.

=== Other villages in the rural district ===
- Cheshmeh Tala
- Darbid-e Bala
- Darbid-e Pain
- Darbid-e Vosta
- Lalabad
- Shineh-ye Bala
- Shineh-ye Pain
- Varnameh
