= Kol Kol Rural District =

Rural district in Ilam province, Iran

Kol Kol Rural District Persian: دهستان کل کل
- Rural District
- Location within Iran
- Coordinates: 33°55′19″N 46°24′00″E
- Country: Iran
- Province: Ilam
- County: Chardavol
- District: Asemanabad
- Capital: Kol Kol-e Olya
- Time zone: UTC+3:30 (IRST)

Kol Kol Rural District (Persian: دهستان کل کل) is in Asemanabad District of Chardavol County, (Note: Formerly Shirvan and Chardavol County) Ilam province, Iran. Its capital is the village of Kol Kol-e Olya, whose population at the time of the 2016 National Census was 1,576 in 448 households.

== History ==
After the 2016 census, Asemanabad Rural District was separated from the Central District in the formation of Asemanabad District, and Kol Kol Rural District was created in the new district.
