= Kakasharaf Rural District =

Rural district in Lorestan province, Iran

Kakasharaf Rural District Persian: دهستان كاكاشرف
- Rural District
- Location within Iran
- Coordinates: 33°19′N 48°30′E
- Country: Iran
- Province: Lorestan
- County: Khorramabad
- District: Central
- Established: 1987

Population (2016)
  - Total: 2,742
- Time zone: UTC+3:30 (IRST)

Kakasharaf Rural District (Persian: دهستان كاكاشرف) is in the Central District of Khorramabad County, Lorestan province, Iran.

== Demographics ==
=== Population ===
At the time of the 2006 National Census, the rural district's population was 4,091 in 799 households. There were 3,627 inhabitants in 807 households at the following census of 2011. The 2016 census measured the population of the rural district as 2,742 in 732 households. The most populous of its 39 villages was Pirjed, with 471 people.

=== Other villages in the rural district ===
- Cheshmeh Ali
- Deh Now
- Deh Now Pirjed
- Nushabad
- Soranjeh
- Tappeh Dar
