= Firuzabad Rural District =

Rural district in Lorestan province, Iran

Firuzabad Rural District Persian: دهستان فيروزآباد
- Rural District
- Location within Iran
- Coordinates: 33°54′N 48°06′E
- Country: Iran
- Province: Lorestan
- County: Selseleh
- District: Firuzabad
- Established: 1987
- Capital: Firuzabad

Population (2016)
  - Total: 10,092
- Time zone: UTC+3:30 (IRST)

Firuzabad Rural District (Persian: دهستان فيروزآباد) is in Firuzabad District of Selseleh County, Lorestan province, Iran. It is administered from the city of Firuzabad.

== Demographics ==
=== Population ===
At the time of the 2006 National Census, the rural district's population was 11,503 in 2,390 households. There were 10,615 inhabitants in 2,645 households at the following census of 2011. The 2016 census measured the population of the rural district as 10,092 in 2,891 households. The most populous of its 47 villages was Temeliyeh, with 1,114 people.

=== Other villages in the rural district ===
- Ab Barik-e Bala
- Ab Barik-e Pain
- Aslan Shahi
- Deh-e Hasanali
- Mohammadabad
- Pir Mohammad Shah
- Sarab-e Sheykh Ali
- Seyl-e Habil
- Sheykhabad-e Zangivand
