= Guran Rural District =

Rural district in Ilam province, Iran

Guran Rural District Persian: دهستان گوران
- Rural District
- Location within Iran Location within Ilam Province
- Coordinates: 33°46′10″N 47°04′06″E
- Country: Iran
- Province: Ilam
- County: Holeylan
- District: Central
- Capital: Shiravand

Population (2016)
  - Total: 10,634
- Time zone: UTC+3:30 (IRST)

Guran Rural District (Persian: دهستان گوران) (Note: Formerly Holeylan Rural District (دهستان هُلِيلان)) is in the Central District of Holeylan County, Ilam province, Iran. Its capital is the village of Shiravand. The previous capital of the rural district was the village of Kahreh. Prior to this, its capital was the village of Towhid, now a city.

== Demographics ==
=== Population ===
At the time of the 2006 National Census, the rural district's population (as Holeylan Rural District of the former Holeylan District of Chardavol County (Note: Formerly Shirvan and Chardavol County)) was 12,069 in 2,422 households. There were 10,791 inhabitants in 2,731 households at the following census of 2011. The 2016 census measured the population of the rural district as 10,634 in 2,989 households. The most populous of its 36 villages was Kahreh, with 1,600 people.

In 2018, the district was separated from the county in the establishment of Holeylan County. The rural district was transferred to the new Central District and renamed Guran Rural District.
