= Central District (Chardavol County) =

District in Ilam province, Iran

Central District (Chardavol County) Persian: بخش مرکزی شهرستان چرداول
- District
- Location within Iran Location within Ilam Province
- Coordinates: 33°45′N 46°34′E
- Country: Iran
- Province: Ilam
- County: Chardavol
- Capital: Sarableh

Population (2016)
  - Total: 24,568
- Time zone: UTC+3:30 (IRST)

The Central District of Chardavol County (Note: Formerly Shirvan and Chardavol County) (Persian: بخش مرکزی شهرستان چرداول) is in Ilam province, Iran. Its capital is the city of Sarableh.

== History ==
After the 2011 National Census, Shabab Rural District was separated from the district in the formation of Shabab District. Bijnavand Rural District was separated from the Central District to form Zagros District. After the 2016 census, Halesam Rural District was created in the Central District, and Asemanabad Rural District and the city of Asemanabad were separated from it in the formation of Asemanabad District.

== Demographics ==
=== Population ===
At the time of the 2006 census, the district's population was 41,034 in 8,461 households. The following census in 2011 counted 41,469 people in 10,133 households. The 2016 census measured the population of the district as 24,568 inhabitants in 6,737 households.

=== Administrative divisions ===
Central District (Chardavol County) Population
Administrative Divisions	2006	2011	2016
Asemanabad RD (Note: Transferred to Asemanabad District after the 2016 census)	6,411	6,275	5,895
Bijnavand RD (Note: Transferred to Zagros District)	8,017	7,327	
Halesam RD (Note: Established after the 2016 census)			
Shabab RD (Note: Transferred to Shabab District)	11,004	11,011	
Asemanabad (city)	5,899	5,889	6,280
Sarableh (city)	9,703	10,967	12,393
Total	41,034	41,469	24,568
RD = Rural District
