= Asemanabad District =

District in Ilam province, Iran

Asemanabad District Persian: بخش آسمان آباد
- District
- Location within Iran Location within Ilam Province
- Coordinates: 33°53′46″N 46°26′31″E
- Country: Iran
- Province: Ilam
- County: Chardavol
- Capital: Asemanabad
- Time zone: UTC+3:30 (IRST)

Asemanabad District (Persian: بخش آسمان آباد) is in Chardavol County, (Note: Formerly Shirvan and Chardavol County) Ilam province, Iran. Its capital is the city of Asemanabad, whose population at the time of the 2016 National Census was 6,280 people in 1,660 households.

== History ==
After the 2016 census, Asemanabad Rural District and Asemanabad were separated from the Central District in the formation of Asemanabad District.

== Demographics ==
=== Administrative divisions ===
Asemanabad District
Administrative Divisions
Asemanabad RD
Kol Kol RD
Asemanabad (city)
RD = Rural District
