= Shabab Rural District =

Rural district in Ilam province, Iran

Shabab Rural District Persian: دهستان شباب
- Rural District
- Location within Iran Location within Ilam Province
- Coordinates: 33°43′50″N 46°39′32″E
- Country: Iran
- Province: Ilam
- County: Chardavol
- District: Shabab
- Capital: Sang-e Sefid

Population (2016)
  - Total: 3,063
- Time zone: UTC+3:30 (IRST)

Shabab Rural District (Persian: دهستان شباب) is in Shabab District of Chardavol County, (Note: Formerly Shirvan and Chardavol County) Ilam province, Iran. Its capital is the village of Sang-e Sefid. The previous capital of the rural district was the village of Halesam, and prior to this, its capital was the village of Shabab, now a city.

== Demographics ==
=== Population ===
At the time of the 2006 National Census, the rural district's population (as a part of the Central District) was 11,004 in 2,306 households. There were 11,011 inhabitants in 2,796 households at the following census of 2011. The 2016 census measured the population of the rural district as 3,063 in 852 households, by which time it had been separated from the district in the establishment of Shahab District. The most populous of its 20 villages was Halesam, with 494 people.
