= Holeylan District =

Former district in Ilam province, Iran

Holeylan District Persian: بخش هلیلان
- Former District
- Location within Iran Location within Ilam Province
- Coordinates: 33°44′45″N 47°11′55″E
- Country: Iran
- Province: Ilam
- County: Chardavol
- Capital: Towhid

Population (2016)
  - Total: 15,276
- Time zone: UTC+3:30 (IRST)

Holeylan District (Persian: بخش هلیلان) is a former administrative division of Chardavol County, (Note: Formerly Shirvan and Chardavol County) Ilam province, Iran. Its capital was the city of Towhid.

== History ==
After the 2016 National Census, the district was separated from the county in the establishment of Holeylan County.

== Demographics ==
=== Population ===
At the time of the 2006 census, the district's population was 15,191 in 3,066 households. The following census in 2011 counted 14,793 people in 3,696 households. The 2016 census measured the population of the district as 15,276 inhabitants in 4,240 households.

=== Administrative divisions ===
Holeylan District Population
Administrative Divisions	2006	2011	2016
Holeylan RD (Note: Renamed Guran Rural District)	12,069	10,791	10,634
Zardalan RD	2,518	2,527	2,514
Towhid (city)	604	1,475	2,128
Total	15,191	14,793	15,276
RD = Rural District
