= Shabab District =

District in Ilam province, Iran

Shabab District Persian: بخش شباب
- District
- Location within Iran Location within Ilam Province
- Coordinates: 33°44′32″N 46°38′20″E
- Country: Iran
- Province: Ilam
- County: Chardavol
- Capital: Shabab

Population (2016)
  - Total: 11,135
- Time zone: UTC+3:30 (IRST)

Shabab District (Persian: بخش شباب) is in Chardavol County, (Note: Formerly Shirvan and Chardavol County) Ilam province, Iran. Its capital is the city of Shabab.

== History ==
After the 2011 National Census, Shabab Rural District was separated from the Central District in the formation of Shabab District. In addition, the village of Shabab was elevated to the status of a city.

== Demographics ==
=== Population ===
At the time of the 2016 census, the district's population was 11,135 inhabitants in 3,092 households.

=== Administrative divisions ===
Shabab District Population
Administrative Divisions	2016
Shabab RD	3,063
Zanjireh RD	3,984
Shabab (city)	4,088
Total	11,135
RD = Rural District
