= Holeylan County =

County in Ilam Province, Iran

Holeylan County Persian: شهرستان هلیلان
- County
- Location of Holeylan County in Ilam province (top right, green)

- Location of Ilam Province in Iran
- Coordinates: 33°45′45″N 47°11′55″E
- Country: Iran
- Province: Ilam
- Capital: Towhid
- Districts: Central, Jazman
- Time zone: UTC+3:30 (IRST)

Holeylan County (Persian: شهرستان هلیلان) is in Ilam province, Iran. Its capital is the city of Towhid, whose population at the time of the 2016 National Census was 2,128 in 601 households. The village is populated by Kurds.

== History ==
In 2018, Holeylan District was separated from Chardavol County (Note: Formerly Shirvan and Chardavol County) in the establishment of Holeylan County, which was divided into two districts of two rural districts each, with Towhid as its capital and only city.

== Demographics ==
=== Administrative divisions ===
Holeylan County's administrative structure is shown in the following table.

Holeylan County
Administrative Divisions
Central District
Dajivand RD
Guran RD (Note: Formerly Holeylan Rural District)
Towhid (city)
Jazman District
Darbid RD
Zardalan RD
RD = Rural District

== See also ==
Media related to Holeylan County at Wikimedia Commons
