= Firuzabad District (Selseleh County) =

District in Lorestan province, Iran

Firuzabad District Persian: بخش فیروزآباد
- District
- Location within Iran
- Coordinates: 33°49′N 47°57′E
- Country: Iran
- Province: Lorestan
- County: Selseleh
- Established: 1995
- Capital: Firuzabad

Population (2016)
  - Total: 16,168
- Time zone: UTC+3:30 (IRST)

Firuzabad District (Persian: بخش فیروزآباد) is in Selseleh County, Lorestan province, Iran. Its capital is the city of Firuzabad.

== Demographics ==
=== Population ===
At the time of the 2006 National Census, the district's population was 17,201 in 3,579 households. The following census in 2011 counted 16,084 people in 3,956 households. The 2016 census measured the population of the district as 16,168 inhabitants in 4,533 households.

=== Administrative divisions ===
Firuzabad District Population
Administrative Divisions	2006	2011	2016
Firuzabad RD	11,503	10,615	10,092
Qalayi RD	2,841	2,593	2,677
Firuzabad (city)	2,857	2,876	3,399
Total	17,201	16,084	16,168
RD = Rural District
