= Chardavol County =

County in Ilam Province, Iran

Chardavol County Persian: شهرستان چرداول
- County
- Location of Chardavol County in Ilam province (top, purple)

- Location of Ilam province in Iran
- Coordinates: 33°46′N 46°37′E
- Country: Iran
- Province: Ilam
- Capital: Sarableh
- Districts: Central, Asemanabad, Shabab, Zagros

Population (2016)
  - Total: 57,381
- Time zone: UTC+3:30 (IRST)

Chardavol County Persian: شهرستان چرداول) (Note: Kurdish: چەرداوڵ, romanized as Çerdawił; formerly Shirvan and Chardavol County (شهرستان شیروان و چرداول)) is in Ilam province, Iran. Its capital is the city of Sarableh.

== History ==
After the 2011 National Census, Shirvan District was separated from the county in the establishment of Sirvan County. Shabab Rural District was separated from the Central District in the formation of Shabab District, including the new Zanjireh Rural District. Bijnavand Rural District was separated from the Central District to form Zagros District, including the new Qaleh Rural District. In addition, the village of Shabab was elevated to the status of a city, and the village of Balavah Tareh-ye Sofla was elevated to city status as Balavah.

After the 2016 census, Halesam Rural District was created in the Central District, and Asemanabad Rural District and the city of Asemanabad were separated from it in the formation of Asemanabad District, including the new Kol Kol Rural District. In 2018, Holeylan District was separated from the county in the formation of Holeylan County.

== Demographics ==
=== Population ===
At the time of the 2006 census, the county's population was 73,422 in 15,087 households. The following census in 2011 counted 72,167 people in 17,764 households. The 2016 census measured the population of the county as 57,381 in 15,867 households.

=== Administrative divisions ===
Chardavol County's population history and administrative structure over three consecutive censuses are shown in the following table.

Chardavol County Population
Administrative Divisions	2006	2011	2016
Central District	41,034	41,469	24,568
Asemanabad RD	6,411	6,275	5,895
Bijnavand RD	8,017	7,327	
Halesam RD (Note: Established after the 2016 census)			
Shabab RD	11,004	11,011	
Asemanabad (city)	5,899	5,889	6,280
Sarableh (city)	9,703	10,967	12,393
Asemanabad District			
Asemanabad RD			
Kol Kol RD			
Asemanabad (city)			
Holeylan District (Note: Transferred to Holeylan County)	15,191	14,793	15,276
Holeylan RD (Note: Renamed Guran Rural District)	12,069	10,791	10,634
Zardalan RD	2,518	2,527	2,514
Towhid (city)	604	1,475	2,128
Shabab District			11,135
Shabab RD			3,063
Zanjireh RD			3,984
Shabab (city)			4,088
Shirvan District (Note: Transferred to Sirvan County)	17,197	15,855	
Karezan RD	4,593	4,345	
Lumar RD	6,223	5,157	
Zangvan RD	3,679	3,695	
Lumar (city)	2,702	2,658	
Zagros District			6,395
Bijnavand RD			4,194
Qaleh RD			1,937
Balavah (city) (Note: Formerly the village of Balavah Tareh-ye Sofla)			264
Total	73,422	72,167	57,381
RD = Rural District

== See also ==
Media related to Chardavol County at Wikimedia Commons
