= Ali Morad Khani-ye Sofla =

Village in Ilam, Iran

Ali Morad Khani-ye Sofla عليمرادخاني سفلي
- Village
- Location within Iran
- Coordinates: 33°39′17″N 46°45′48″E
- Country: Iran
- Province: Ilam
- County: Chardavol
- Bakhsh: Zagros
- Rural District: Bijnavand

Population (2006)
  - Total: 98
- Time zone: UTC+3:30 (IRST)
  - Summer (DST): UTC+4:30 (IRDT)

Ali Morad Khani-ye Sofla (Persian: عليمرادخاني سفلي, also Romanized as ‘Alī Morād Khānī-ye Soflá and ‘Alīmorādkhānī-ye Soflá; also known as ‘Alī Morād Khān-e Pā’īn and ‘Alī Morād Khān-e Soflá) is a village in Bijnavand Rural District, in the Zagros District of Chardavol County, Ilam Province, Iran. At the 2006 census, its population was 98, in 19 families. The village is populated by Kurds.
