= Neyduleh-ye Sofla =

Neyduleh-ye Sofla نيدوله سفلي
- Village
- Location within Iran
- Coordinates: 33°37′58″N 46°56′59″E
- Country: Iran
- Province: Ilam
- County: Chardavol
- Bakhsh: Zagros
- Rural District: Bijnavand

Population (2006)
  - Total: 74
- Time zone: UTC+3:30 (IRST)
  - Summer (DST): UTC+4:30 (IRDT)

Neyduleh-ye Sofla (Persian: نيدوله سفلي, also Romanized as Neydūleh-ye Soflá; also known as Neydūleh) is a village in Bijnavand Rural District, in the Zagros District of Chardavol County, Ilam Province, Iran. At the 2006 census, its population was 74, in 15 families. The village is populated by Kurds.
