= Choqa Balak-e Harqorush =

Choqa Balak-e Harqorush چقابلك هرقروش
- Village
- Location within Iran
- Coordinates: 33°39′03″N 46°49′08″E
- Country: Iran
- Province: Ilam
- County: Chardavol
- Bakhsh: Zagros
- Rural District: Bijnavand

Population (2006)
  - Total: 116
- Time zone: UTC+3:30 (IRST)
  - Summer (DST): UTC+4:30 (IRDT)

Choqa Balak-e Harqorush (Persian: چقابلك هرقروش, also Romanized as Choqā Balak-e Harqorūsh; also known as Harqorūsh) is a village in Bijnavand Rural District, in the Zagros District of Chardavol County, Ilam Province, Iran. At the 2006 census, its population was 116, in 24 families. The village is populated by Kurds.
