= Ali Morad Khani-ye Olya =

Ali Morad Khani-ye Olya عليمرادخاني عليا
- Village
- Location within Iran
- Coordinates: 33°40′01″N 46°44′29″E
- Country: Iran
- Province: Ilam
- County: Chardavol
- Bakhsh: Zagros
- Rural District: Bijnavand

Population (2006)
  - Total: 146
- Time zone: UTC+3:30 (IRST)
  - Summer (DST): UTC+4:30 (IRDT)

Ali Morad Khani-ye Olya (Persian: عليمرادخاني عليا, also Romanized as ‘Alī Morād Khānī-ye Olyā; also known as ‘Alī Morādkhānī, ‘Alī Morād Khānī-ye Bālā, and ‘Alīmorādkhānī-ye ‘Olyā) is a village in Bijnavand Rural District, in the Zagros District of Chardavol County, Ilam Province, Iran. At the 2006 census, its population was 146, in 28 families. The village is populated by Kurds.
