= Belavah Tareh-ye Olya =

Belavah Tareh-ye Olya بلاوه تره عليا
- Village
- Location within Iran
- Coordinates: 33°40′31″N 46°47′45″E
- Country: Iran
- Province: Ilam
- County: Chardavol
- Bakhsh: Zagros
- Rural District: Bijnavand

Population (2006)
  - Total: 120
- Time zone: UTC+3:30 (IRST)
  - Summer (DST): UTC+4:30 (IRDT)

Belavah Tareh-ye Olya (Persian: بلاوه تره عليا, also Romanized as Belāvah Tareh-ye ‘Olyā) is a village in Bijnavand Rural District, in the Zagros District of Chardavol County, Ilam Province, Iran. At the 2006 census, its population was 120, in 28 families. The village is populated by Kurds.
