= Choqa Balak =

Choqa Balak or Chaqa Balak (Persian: چقابلك) may refer to:

- Choqa Balak-e Chalab Zard
- Choqa Balak-e Harqorush
