= Takht-e Bastam-e Sofla =

Takht-e Bastam-e Sofla تخت بسطام سفلي
- Village
- Location within Iran
- Coordinates: 33°38′01″N 46°54′12″E
- Country: Iran
- Province: Ilam
- County: Chardavol
- Bakhsh: Zagros
- Rural District: Bijnavand

Population (2006)
  - Total: 33
- Time zone: UTC+3:30 (IRST)
  - Summer (DST): UTC+4:30 (IRDT)

Takht-e Bastam-e Sofla (Persian: تخت بسطام سفلي, also Romanized as Takht-e Basţām-e Soflá) is a village in Bijnavand Rural District, in the Zagros District of Chardavol County, Ilam Province, Iran. At the 2006 census, its population was 33, in 9 families. The village is populated by Kurds.
