= Neyduleh-ye Olya =

Village in Ilam, Iran

Neyduleh-ye Olya نيدوله عليا
- Village
- Location within Iran
- Coordinates: 33°38′07″N 46°55′40″E
- Country: Iran
- Province: Ilam
- County: Chardavol
- Bakhsh: Zagros
- Rural District: Bijnavand

Population (2006)
  - Total: 175
- Time zone: UTC+3:30 (IRST)
  - Summer (DST): UTC+4:30 (IRDT)

Neyduleh-ye Olya (Persian: نيدوله عليا, also Romanized as Neydūleh-ye ‘Olyā) is a village in Bijnavand Rural District, in the Zagros District of Chardavol County, Ilam Province, Iran. At the 2006 census, its population was 175, in 42 families. The village is populated by Kurds.
