= Takht-e Bastam =

Takht-e Bastam (Persian: تخت بسطام) may refer to:

- Takht-e Bastam-e Olya
- Takht-e Bastam-e Sofla
