= Ali Morad Khani =

Ali Morad Khani or Alimoradkhani or Ali Moradkhani or Ali Morad Khan (Persian: عليمرادخاني) may refer to:

- Alimorad Khan
- Ali Morad Khani-ye Olya
- Ali Morad Khani-ye Sofla
