= Kaleh Qatar-e Olya =

Kaleh Qatar-e Olya كله قطارعليا
- Village
- Location within Iran
- Coordinates: 33°40′31″N 46°44′33″E
- Country: Iran
- Province: Ilam
- County: Chardavol
- Bakhsh: Zagros
- Rural District: Bijnavand

Population (2006)
  - Total: 53
- Time zone: UTC+3:30 (IRST)
  - Summer (DST): UTC+4:30 (IRDT)

Kaleh Qatar-e Olya (Persian: كله قطارعليا, also Romanized as Kaleh Qaţār-e ‘Olyā; also known as Kaleh Qaţār and Kal-e Qaţār-e ‘Olyā) is a village in Bijnavand Rural District, in the Zagros District of Chardavol County, Ilam Province, Iran. At the 2006 census, its population was 53, in 12 families. The village is populated by Kurds.
