= Zir Tang, Ilam =

Village in Ilam province, Iran

Zir Tang Persian: زيرتنگ
- Village
- Location within Iran Location within Ilam Province
- Coordinates: 33°38′46″N 46°55′23″E
- Country: Iran
- Province: Ilam
- County: Chardavol
- District: Zagros
- Rural District: Bijnavand

Population (2016)
  - Total: 469
- Time zone: UTC+3:30 (IRST)

Zir Tang (Persian: زيرتنگ) (Note: Also romanized as Zīr Tang; also known as Zīrtang Bījanvand) is a village in, and the capital of, Bijnavand Rural District of Zagros District, Chardavol County, (Note: Formerly Shirvan and Chardavol County) Ilam province, Iran. The previous capital of the rural district was the village of Balavah Tareh-ye Sofla, now the city of Balavah.

== Demographics ==
=== Ethnicity ===
The village is populated by Kurds.

=== Population ===
At the time of the 2006 National Census, the village's population was 501 in 110 households, when it was in the Central District. The following census in 2011 counted 487 people in 119 households. The 2016 census measured the population of the village as 469 people in 124 households, by which time the rural district had been separated from the district in the formation of Zagros District.
