= Neyduleh =

Neyduleh or Ney Duleh (Persian: نيدوله) may refer to:

- Neyduleh-ye Olya
- Neyduleh-ye Sofla
