= Choqa Balak-e Chalab Zard =

Choqa Balak-e Chalab Zard چقابلك چالاب زرد
- Village
- Location within Iran
- Coordinates: 33°39′14″N 46°52′31″E
- Country: Iran
- Province: Ilam
- County: Chardavol
- Bakhsh: Zagros
- Rural District: Bijnavand

Population (2006)
  - Total: 153
- Time zone: UTC+3:30 (IRST)
  - Summer (DST): UTC+4:30 (IRDT)

Choqa Balak-e Chalab Zard (Persian: چقابلك چالاب زرد, also Romanized as Choqā Balak-e Chālāb Zard; also known as Chaqā Balak, Chīābalak, Choqā Balak, and Choqā Baleh Chālāb Zard) is a village in Bijnavand Rural District, in the Zagros District of Chardavol County, Ilam Province, Iran. At the 2006 census, its population was 153, in 28 families. The village is populated by Kurds.
