= Takht-e Bastam-e Olya =

Takht-e Bastam-e Olya تخت بسطام عليا
- Village
- Location within Iran
- Coordinates: 33°38′01″N 46°53′56″E
- Country: Iran
- Province: Ilam
- County: Chardavol
- Bakhsh: Zagros
- Rural District: Bijnavand

Population (2006)
  - Total: 23
- Time zone: UTC+3:30 (IRST)
  - Summer (DST): UTC+4:30 (IRDT)

Takht-e Bastam-e Olya (Persian: تخت بسطام عليا, also Romanized as Takht-e Basţām-e ‘Olyā) is a village in Bijnavand Rural District, in the Zagros District of Chardavol County, Ilam Province, Iran. At the 2006 census, its population was 23, in 5 families. The village is populated by Kurds.
