= Taq-e Gavarin =

Village in Ilam province, Iran

Taq-e Gavarin Persian: طاق گاورين
- Village
- Location within Iran Location within Ilam Province
- Coordinates: 33°41′10″N 46°43′43″E
- Country: Iran
- Province: Ilam
- County: Chardavol
- District: Zagros
- Rural District: Bijnavand

Population (2016)
  - Total: 511
- Time zone: UTC+3:30 (IRST)

Taq-e Gavarin (Persian: طاق گاورين) (Note: Also romanized as Ţāq Gāvarīn and Ţāq-e Gāvarīn; also known as Ţāq Gārvīn) is a village in Bijnavand Rural District of Zagros District, Chardavol County, (Note: Formerly Shirvan and Chardavol County) Ilam province, Iran.

== Demographics ==
=== Ethnicity ===
The village is populated by Kurds.

=== Population ===
At the time of the 2006 National Census, the village's population was 533 in 128 households, when it was in the Central District. The following census in 2011 counted 581 people in 153 households. The 2016 census measured the population of the village as 511 people in 155 households, by which time the rural district had been separated from the district in the formation of Zagros District. It was the most populous village in its rural district.
