= Belavah Tareh =

Belavah Tareh or Balavah Tareh (Persian: بلاوه تره) may refer to:

- Belavah Tareh-ye Olya
- Belavah Tareh-ye Sofla
