= Kaleh Qatar =

Kaleh Qatar (Persian: كله قطار) may refer to:

- Kaleh Qatar-e Olya
- Kaleh Qatar-e Sofla
