= Halat, Iran =

Halat هلت
- Village
- Location within Iran
- Coordinates: 33°38′29″N 46°50′50″E
- Country: Iran
- Province: Ilam
- County: Chardavol
- Bakhsh: Zagros
- Rural District: Bijnavand

Population (2006)
  - Total: 141
- Time zone: UTC+3:30 (IRST)
  - Summer (DST): UTC+4:30 (IRDT)

Halat (Persian: هلت; also known as Halat-e Chālāb Zard) is a village in Bijnavand Rural District, in the Zagros District of Chardavol County, Ilam Province, Iran. At the 2006 census, its population was 141, in 33 families. The village is populated by Kurds.
