= Halat =

Halat could refer to the following places:

- Halat, Iran, a village in Chardaval County, Ilam Province, Iran
- Halat, Lebanon, a village in Byblos District, Mount Lebanon Governorate, Lebanon
