= Kabir Kouh Tunnel =

Road tunnel in Iran

Kabir Kuh Tunnel
- One of the entrances to the tunnel.
- Interactive map of Kabir Kuh Tunnel

Overview
- Official name: Persian: تونل کبیرکوه
- Other name: Kabir Kooh Tunnel
- Line: Road
- Location: Ilam province, Iran
- Coordinates: 33°01′06″N 47°29′22″E
- Status: Under Construction
- Crosses: Kabir Kuh
- Start: Yujhendar, Darreh Shahr County
- End: Near Abdanan

Operation
- Work began: 2010
- Owner: IRI RMTO
- Toll: Toll Free

Technical
- Length: 6,250 m (20,510 ft)
- No. of lanes: 2
- Tunnel clearance: 7 metres (23 ft)
- Width: 12 metres (39 ft)

Kabir Kouh Tunnel is an ongoing road tunnel project in Ilam province, Iran. The tunnel passes under the Kabir Kouh range connecting the counties of Darreh Shahr and Abdanan, shortening the current 40-kilometre (25 mi) mountain pass to about 6 km. Kabir Kouh is a 170-kilometre (110 mi) long mountain range in Ilam Province extending along a southeast–northwest axis from an area near Pa Alam, Lorestan province to the vicinity of Chenar Bashi about 20 km (12 mi) south of Ilam. The range acts as a barrier between the province's western areas such as Abdanan and border cities of Mehran and Dehloran with the country's internal road networks.

The tunnel eliminates the 40-km Kabir Kouh Mountain Pass which reaches as high as 1,700 m (5,600 ft) above sea level at its peak and consists of hundreds of hairpin turns.

The project consists of a 4,750-metre (15,580 ft) main tunnel and eight other shorter tunnels with a total length of 1,500 m (4,900 ft) connecting the Darreh Shahr-Pole Dokhtar route to the main tunnel.

The construction of the tunnel started in May 2010 and was planned to be opened in four years. As of August 2019, the main and connecting tunnels have been dug but the project is yet to be completed.
