= Shahrak-e Zu ol Faqari =

Shahrak-e Zu ol Faqari شهرك ذوالفقاري
- Village
- Location within Iran
- Coordinates: 32°27′19″N 47°49′36″E
- Country: Iran
- Province: Ilam
- County: Dehloran
- Bakhsh: Musian
- Rural District: Dasht-e Abbas

Population (2006)
  - Total: 982
- Time zone: UTC+3:30 (IRST)
  - Summer (DST): UTC+4:30 (IRDT)

Shahrak-e Zu ol Faqari (Persian: شهرك ذوالفقاري, also Romanized as Shahrak-e Z̄ū ol Faqārī; also known as Shahrak-e Z̄ū ol Faqār) is a village in Dasht-e Abbas Rural District, Musian District, Dehloran County, Ilam Province, Iran. At the 2006 census, its population was 982, in 133 families. The village is populated by Arabs.
