= Balavah =

City in Ilam province, Iran

Balavah Persian: بلاوه
- City
- Location within Iran Location within Ilam Province
- Coordinates: 33°40′02″N 46°48′13″E
- Country: Iran
- Province: Ilam
- County: Chardavol
- District: Zagros

Population (2016)
  - Total: 264
- Time zone: UTC+3:30 (IRST)

Balavah (Persian: بلاوه) (Note: Also romanized as Belavah; formerly Balavah Tareh-ye Sofla (بلاوه تره سفلي), also romanized as Belāvah Tareh-ye Soflá; also known as Belāveh Tareh) is a city in, and the capital of, Zagros District of Chardavol County, (Note: Formerly Shirvan and Chardavol County) Ilam province, Iran. As the village of Balavah Tareh-ye Sofla, it was the capital of Bijnavand Rural District until its capital was transferred to the village of Zir Tang.

== Demographics ==
=== Ethnicity ===
The city is populated by Kurds.

=== Population ===
At the time of the 2006 National Census, Balavah's population was 290 in 63 households, when it was a village in Bijnavand Rural District of the Central District. The following census in 2011 counted 288 people in 76 households. The 2016 census measured the population as 264 people in 79 households, by which time the rural district had been separated from the district in the formation of Zagros District. Balavah Tareh-ye Sofla was elevated to city status as Balavah.
