= Pol-e Zal =

Pol-e Zal پل زال
- Village
- Location within Iran
- Coordinates: 32°47′49″N 48°04′59″E
- Country: Iran
- Province: Khuzestan
- County: Andimeshk
- Bakhsh: Alvar-e Garmsiri
- Rural District: Hoseyniyeh

Population (2006)
  - Total: 77
- Time zone: UTC+3:30 (IRST)
  - Summer (DST): UTC+4:30 (IRDT)

Pol-e Zal (Persian: پل زال, also Romanized as Pol-e Zāl; also known as Polezāl) is a village in Hoseyniyeh Rural District, Alvar-e Garmsiri District, Andimeshk County, Khuzestan Province, Iran. At the 2006 census, its population was 77, in 14 families. The village is located close to Khorramabad-Pol-e Zal Freeway.
