= Chenar Bashi =

Village in Iran

Chenar چنارباشی
- village
- Chenar Bashi
- Location within Iran
- Coordinates: 33°26′27″N 46°47′09″E
- Country: Iran
- Province: Ilam
- County: Badreh
- Bakhsh: قیطول
- Rural District: کبیرکوه

Government
  - خان: باشی کبیر

Population (2006)
  - Total: 462
- Time zone: UTC+3:30 (IRST)
  - Summer (DST): UTC+4:30 (IRDT)
- Website: https://t.me/chenar_bashi

Chenar Bashi (Persian: چنارباشی, also Romanized as Chenār Bāshī) is a village in بیره ی, in the کبیرکوه of badreh County, Ilam Province, Iran. At the 2006 census, its population was 462, in 83 families. The village is populated by Kurds.
