= Quercus persica =

Conservation status
- Near Threatened (IUCN 3.1)

Scientific classification
- Kingdom: Plantae
- Clade: Embryophytes
- Clade: Tracheophytes
- Clade: Spermatophytes
- Clade: Angiosperms
- Clade: Eudicots
- Clade: Rosids
- Order: Fagales
- Family: Fagaceae
- Genus: Quercus
- Subgenus: Quercus subg. Cerris
- Section: Quercus sect. Cerris
- Species: Q. persica

Binomial name
- Quercus persica Jaub. & Spach

Synonyms
- Quercus aegilops subsp. persica (Jaub. & Spach) Blakelock; Quercus brantii subsp. persica (Jaub. & Spach) O.Schwarz

Species of plant

Quercus persica is a species of flowering plant in the beech family Fagaceae. It is a tree native to western Iran. It was first described in 1843. It has been treated as a subspecies of Quercus brantii. It is placed in section Cerris.
