= Bijnavand Rural District =

Rural district in Ilam province, Iran

Bijnavand Rural District Persian: دهستان بيجنوند
- Rural District
- Location within Iran Location within Ilam Province
- Coordinates: 33°39′39″N 46°51′04″E
- Country: Iran
- Province: Ilam
- County: Chardavol
- District: Zagros
- Capital: Zir Tang

Population (2016)
  - Total: 4,194
- Time zone: UTC+3:30 (IRST)

Bijnavand Rural District (Persian: دهستان بيجنوند) is in Zagros District of Chardavol County, (Note: Formerly Shirvan and Chardavol County) Ilam province, Iran. Its capital is the village of Zir Tang. The previous capital of the rural district was the village of Balavah Tareh-ye Sofla, now the city of Balavah.

== Demographics ==
=== Population ===
At the time of the 2006 National Census, the rural district's population (as a part of the Central District) was 8,017 in 1,670 households. There were 7,327 inhabitants in 1,771 households at the following census of 2011. The 2016 census measured the population of the rural district as 4,194 in 1,140 households, by which time the rural district had been separated from the district in the formation of Zagros District. The most populous of its 42 villages was Taq-e Gavarin, with 511 people.
