= Zagros District =

District in Ilam province, Iran

Zagros District Persian: بخش زاگرس
- District
- Location within Iran Location within Ilam Province
- Coordinates: 33°40′30″N 46°52′10″E
- Country: Iran
- Province: Ilam
- County: Chardavol
- Capital: Balavah

Population (2016)
  - Total: 6,395
- Time zone: UTC+3:30 (IRST)

Zagros District (Persian: بخش زاگرس) is in Chardavol County, (Note: Formerly Shirvan and Chardavol County) Ilam province, Iran. Its capital is the city of Balavah. (Note: Formerly the village of Balavah Tareh-ye Sofla)

== History ==
After the 2011 National Census, Bijnavand Rural District was separated from the Central District in the formation of Zagros District. In addition, the village of Balavah Tareh-ye Sofla was elevated to city status as Balavah.

== Demographics ==
=== Population ===
At the time of the 2016 census, the district's population was 6,395 inhabitants in 1,796 households.

=== Administrative divisions ===
Zagros District Population
Administrative Divisions	2016
Bijnavand RD	4,194
Qaleh RD	1,937
Balavah (city)	264
Total	6,395
RD = Rural District
