= Ilam province =

Province of Iran

Ilam Province استان ایلام (Persian)
- Province
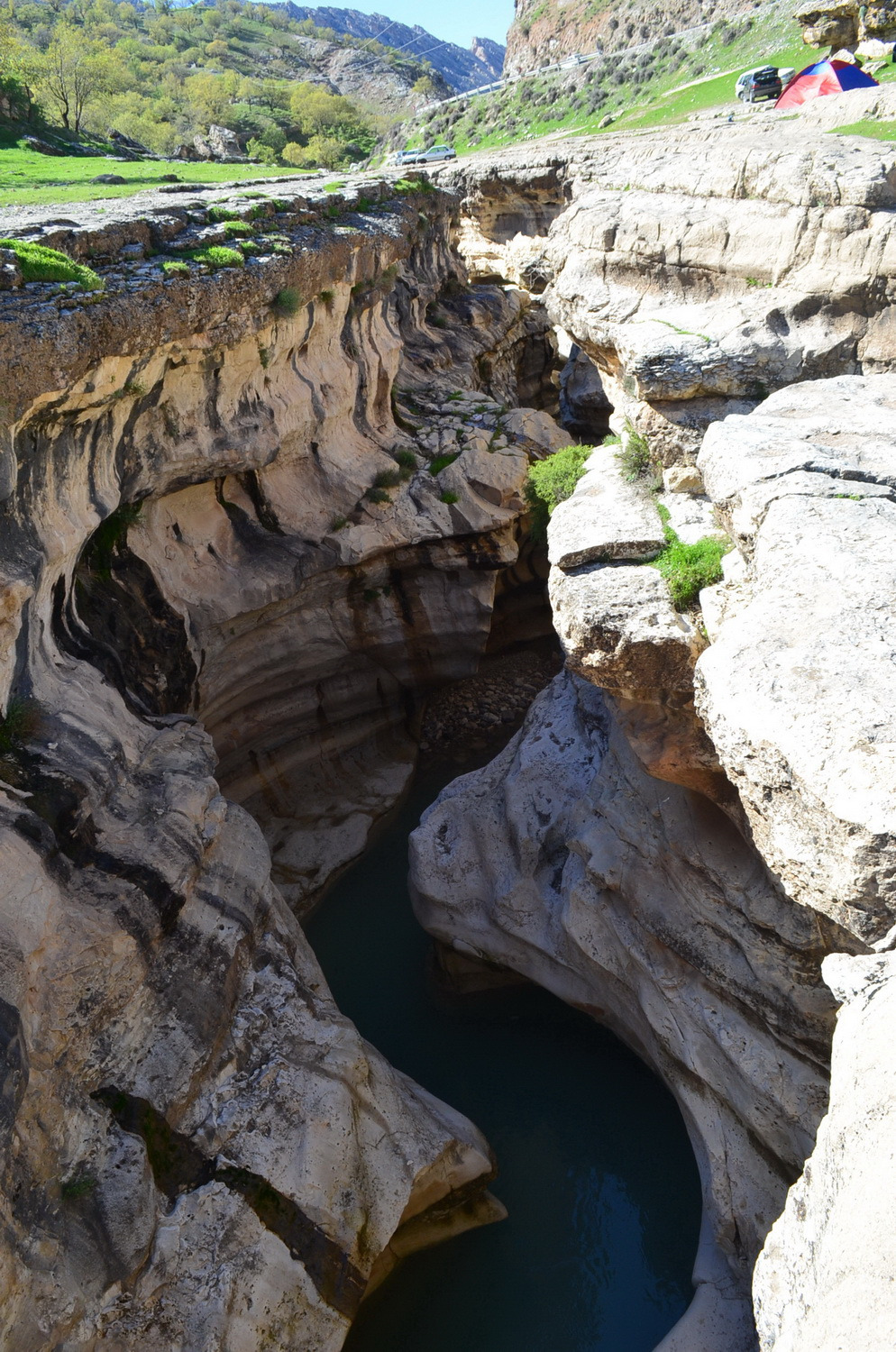
- Landscape of the province

- Location of Ilam Province in Iran
- Coordinates: 33°11′N 46°40′E
- Country: Iran
- Region: Region 4
- Founded: 1974
- Capital: Ilam
- Counties: 12

Government
  - Governor-general: Ahmad Karami (Independent)

Area
  - Province: 20,164.11 km^{2} (7,785.41 sq mi)
  - Urban: 30.13 km^{2} (11.63 sq mi)
  - Rank: 22nd
- Latest measurement in 2019
- Highest elevation (Kan Seifi Peak): 2,775 m (9,104 ft)
- Lowest elevation: 36 m (118 ft)

Population (2016)
  - Province: 580,158
  - Estimate (2024): 904,000
  - Rank: 31st (last)
  - Density: 28.7718/km^{2} (74.5187/sq mi)
  - Urban: 395,263
  - Rural: 184,444
- Time zone: UTC+03:30 (IRST)
- Postal code: 69311–69991
- Area code: +98 84
- ISO 3166 code: IR-16
- Vehicle registration: Iran 98
- Main language(s): Persian (official) local languages: Kurdish; Luri; Arabic
- HDI (2017): 0.815 very high · 8th
- Website: Ilam Portal

Ilam Province (Persian: استان ایلام) (Note: Also romanized as Ostān-e Ilām; Kurdish: پارێزگای ئیلام, romanized as Parêzgeha Îlam) is one of the 31 provinces of Iran. Its capital is the city of Ilam.

The province is in the western part of the country in Region 4 and covers 20,164.11 km^{2} (7,785.41 mi^{2}). It shares 425 km (264 mi) of the border with Iraq, and also borders on the provinces of Kermanshah, Lorestan, and Khuzestan.

== Etymology ==
The name "Ilam" comes from "Elam", the ancient civilisation that ruled in southwestern Iran and southeastern Iraq from 2700 BC to 539 BC.

== History ==
Elam civilization

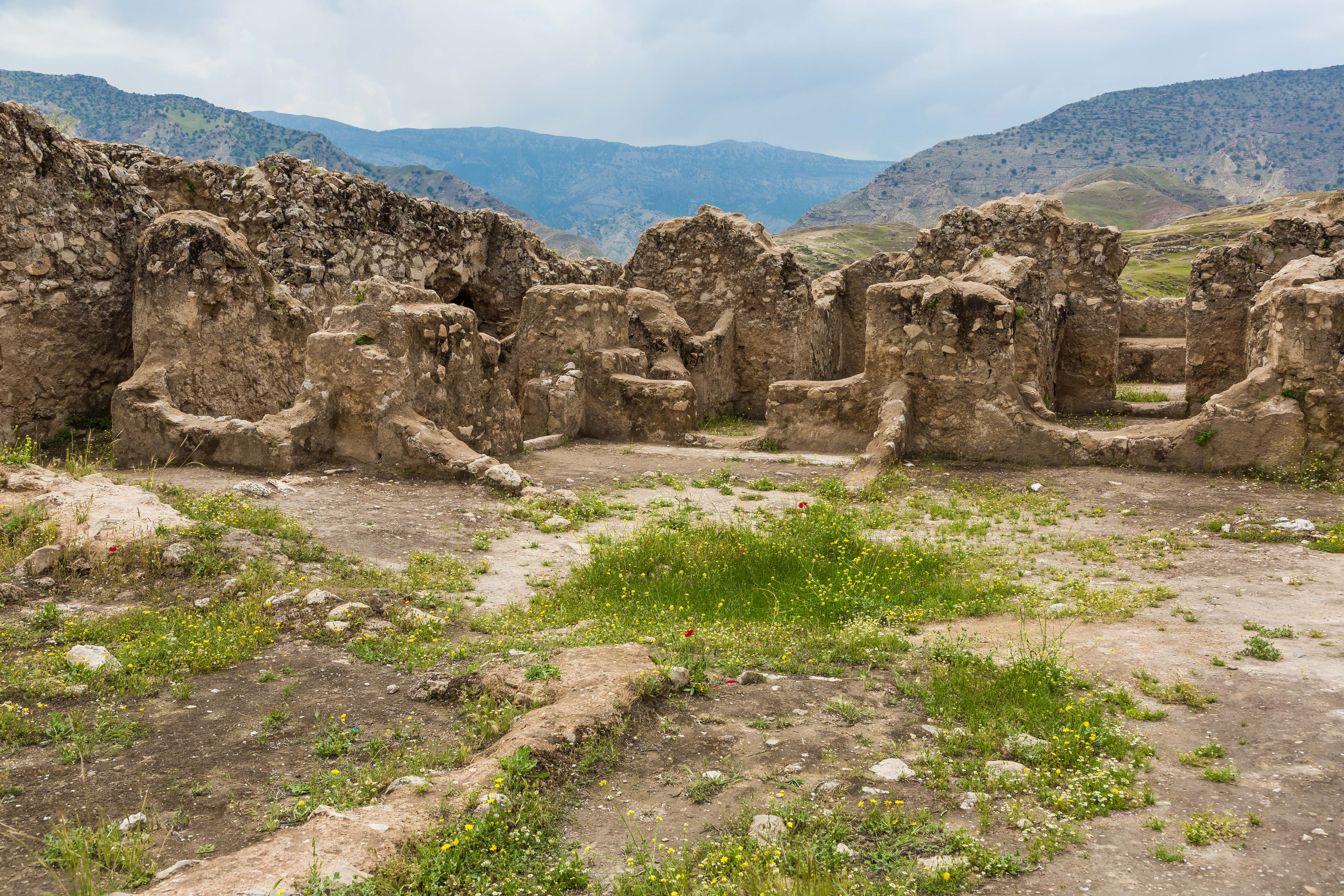
The remnants of Seymareh city, also known as Madaktu and Mehrjaqazaq.

=== Pre-history ===
The name "Ilam" comes from Elam, the ancient civilization that ruled the area in modern southwest Iran and southeast Iraq from 2700 BC to 539 BC. Archaeological findings date human settlement of the area to around 5000 BC.

Ashurbanipal, the then king of Assyria, invaded Elam in 639 BC and totally destroyed it. Although not as united as before, the Elamites survived and continued to live in the area after the invasion. Between 612 and 546 BC, Elam was incorporated into the Median kingdom and later into the Achaemenid Empire in 539 BC. During the Achaemenid era, Elam lost its independence forever and became the third province of the empire after Persis and Media.

During the Median, Achaemenid, Seleucid, and Parthian eras the area and its settlements took on importance due to its proximity to the districts of Hamadan, Kurdistan, Kermanshah, Lorestan and, most notably, Susa.

During the Sasanian era, present-day Ilam was composed of two states: Mehrjanqazaq in the east, which was the modern day Darreh Shahr, and Masbasan in the west.

=== Arab reign ===
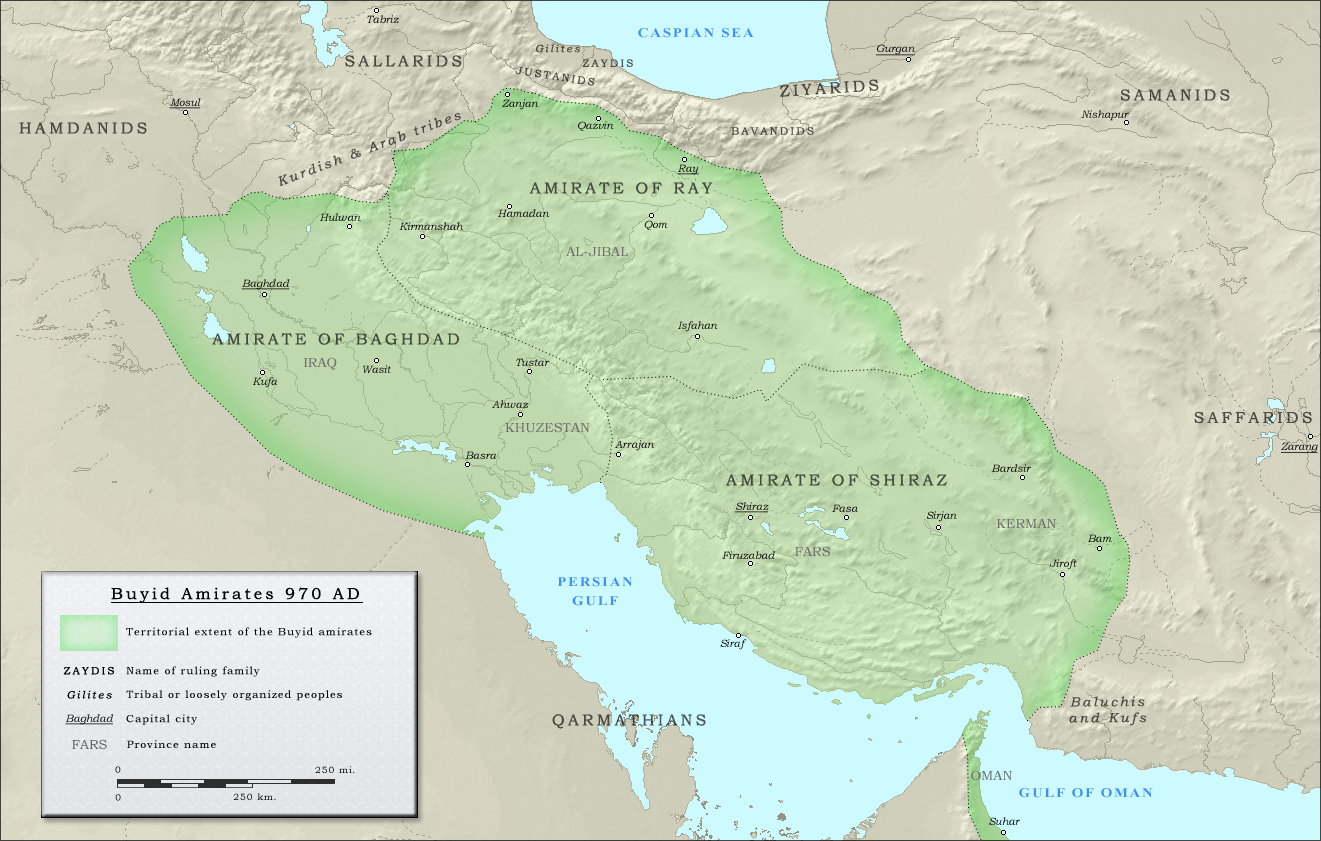
Buyids rule over western Iran

After the Muslim conquest of Mesopotamia in 640 AD, the Arabs named the area the "Land of the Mountains" or "Jibal". During the Arabs' rule, the kingdom of Jibal, whose capital was Seymareh, was one of the territories under the control of Baghdad and Basra, and lasted until 961 CE.

The Rashidun Caliphate conquered Mesopotamia by 640 CE and later the whole of the Sasanian Empire by 643 CE and kept control until their collapse in 661 CE. Prior to their collapse, civil war had taken over the caliphate, which the Muawiyah faction won and thus established the Umayyad Caliphate. The Umayyads controlled the area until their own collapse in 750 AD, after which the Abbasid Caliphate took over and reigned for around two hundred years until 945 CE. After conquering western Iran in 945 CE, the Buyid Dynasty ruled over this area until 1055.

=== Kurdish reign ===
For 270 years, between 1155 and 1424, the Kurds reigned in the Zagros Mountains, especially areas around Lorestan. Hazaraspids who are also known as Lorestan Atabegs were composed of two groups, the Little Lor, who were mostly of Lor descent and Big Lor Atabegs who were of Kurdish descent. The former controlled parts of the present-day provinces of Markazi, Hamedan, Kermanshah, Lorestan, Khuzestan and Ilam.

From 961 to 1015, the Ḥasanwayhid dynasty ruled over western Iran under the influence of the Buyid Dynasty. Centred at Dinawar, near present-day Kermanshah, Hasanwayhids, Kurdish Muslims with ties to the Kurdish Barzikani tribe, controlled central areas of the Zagros Mountains. At its greatest extent, the dynasty included the modern-day areas around Khorramabad, Borujerd, Nahavand, Asadabad, Borujerd, Ahwaz, Ilam, Kermanshah, Hulwan and Kirkuk. The Ḥasanwayhid dynasty was overthrown by the Annazids, who, with help of the Buyid dynasty, controlled the area until their collapse in 1116 CE.

=== Khorshidi dynasty ===
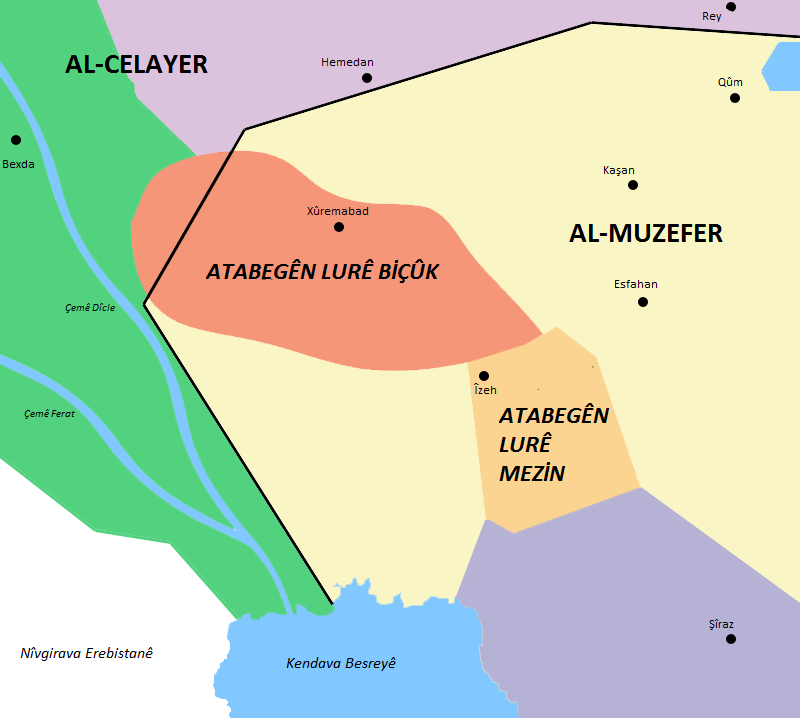
Little and Big Lorestan

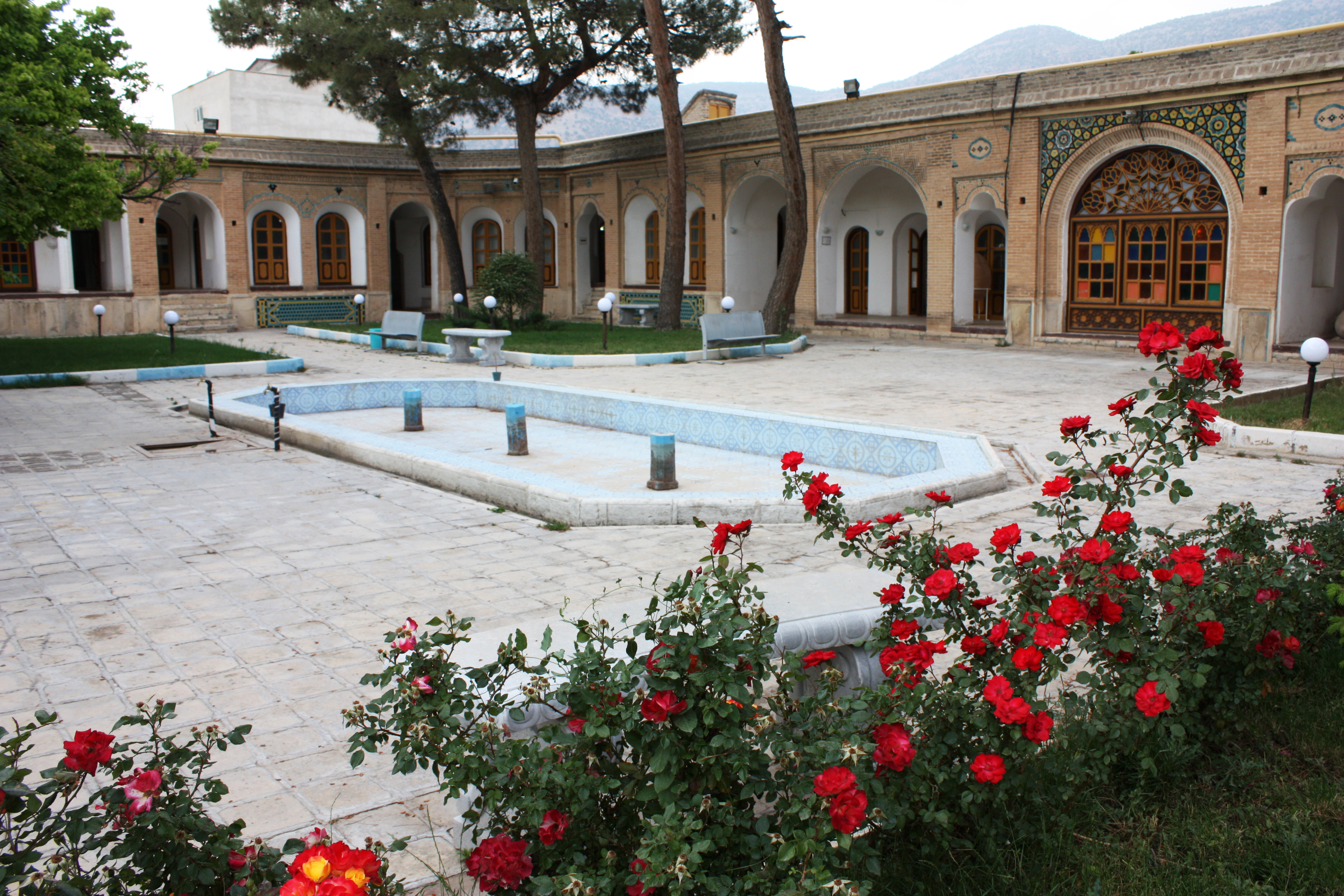
Vali Castle in Ilam

The capital of Little Lor was Shapourkhwast or the modern-day Khorramabad, especially the Falak-ol-Aflak Castle. The Little Lor Atabegs or the Khorshidi dynasty ruled over the area for over 412 years, from 1184 to 1597 CE, after which Shah Abbas the Great executed the last ruler, Shahverdi Khan, and replaced Shahverdi's nephew, Hossein Beyg/Khan, thus ending the rule of Little Lor and beginning of the Vali/Wali dynasty also known as Feyli Vali.

=== Qajar era (1789–1925) ===
During the Qajar era, Lorestan was divided into two regions: Poshtkoh (present-day Ilam province) with the center of Ilam city and Pishkouh (present-day Lorestan) with the center of Khorramabad. Poshtkhouh literally means "back of mountain"; the name was due to the fact that Ilam was situated at the westernmost parts of the Zagros Mountains and to the rest of the country it was plainly considered at the back of mountains.

From that point on, Ilam was ruled independently from Lorestan, and the governor reported directly to the central government, thereby ending Lorestan control of Ilam and Poshtkouh. The two districts were later renamed "Deh-e Bala" and "Deh-e Pa'een", meaning the upper and lower villages respectively. During the rule of Hossein Qoli Khan over Deh-e Bala (1863–1900), it was renamed to "Hossein-Abad Poshtkuh".

The Vali Castle of Ilam was built by the next Vali, Gholamreza Khan Feyli, in 1908. The castle is now a nationally registered heritage and also the Ilam Museum of Anthropology.

=== 20th century ===
Following the establishment of the Pahlavi dynasty in 1925, Reza Shah suppressed the local governments to consolidate his dominance. In 1928, the government forces took over Poshtkouh and Gholamreza Khan Feyli, the last Feyli governor left Poshtkouh for Iraq without any resistance, thus abolishing the rule of the Feylis in Ilam after 332 years. A year later, in 1929, Hossein-Abad was renamed to "Ilam" by the suggestion of Academy of Persian Language and Literature.

On 7 November 1937, the parliament passed a law on the political division of the country, the Act of Division of the Country and the Duties of the Governors, thereby dividing the country into 6 provinces and 50 counties. Poshtkouh, being a county, was part of the West Province.

The 1937 political division law did not last long and on 9 January 1938, an amendment was passed which divided the country into 10 province and 49 counties. Based on the new division, Ilam was a county of the Fifth Province.

In 1964, Darreh Shahr, Abdanan and Dehloran from Lorestan province and Mousian from Khuzestan were annexed to Ilam, thus upping its status to general governorate as part of the Kermanshah Province. Ilam subsequently became a province in March 1974.

After the 1979 Iranian Revolution, Ilam was one of the main battlegrounds of the Iran–Iraq War for years. The war began with the Iraqi invasion into western and southwestern Iran on 22 September 1980. As a border province, Ilam was a constant target for the Iraqi bombing campaign and suffered heavily in terms of economic infrastructure. The war left Ilam province devastated for years, making it one of the least developed provinces in Iran.

== Geography ==
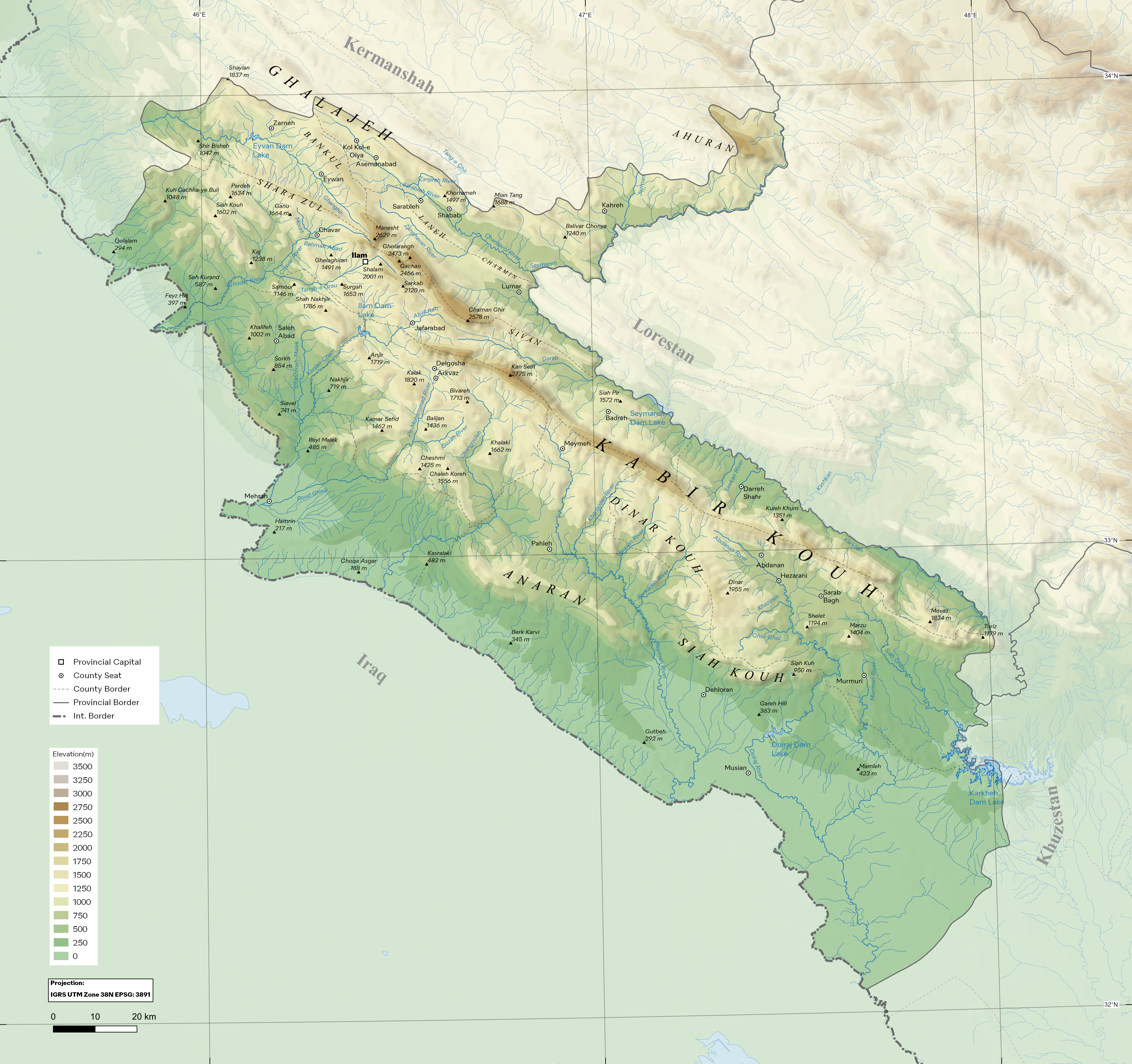
Topographic map of Ilam province indicating mountains and rivers

Ilam province, with an area of 20,150 km^{2} (7,780 mi^{2}), is the 22nd largest province in Iran. It is located in the southwest of the country, in Central Zagros, and is bordered by Iraq to the west, Khuzestan province to the south, Lorestan province to the east, and Kermanshah province to the north.

Ilam province is situated at the southwestern edge of the Zagros Mountains and right at the transition between the Arabian and the Iranian plateaus. Because of this, it is divided into two distinct natural areas: the northern and eastern parts are mountainous, whereas the southwest is covered with low plains that extend to the Iraqi and Khuzestan borders.

The mountains in the north and east are mostly parallel, running in the northwest–southeast direction. These mountains are separated by plains and rolling hills that are mostly used to grow crops and orchards by settlers.

The most prominent mountain in Ilam province is Kabir Kouh, which is located in the eastern part of the province, stretching 160 km from near Pol-e Zal in the southeast to Mishkhas village near Ilam city in the northwest. The highest point in the province, Kan Seifi peak with 2,775 m (9,104 ft) above sea level, is part of Kabir Kouh range.

Other major mountains include:

- Manesht and Qolarang near Ilam
- Sharah-Zoul and Bankoul in Eywan
- Qalajeh and Ahuran in Chardavol
- Dinar Kouh, in Abdanan
- Anaran and Siah Kouh in central Dehloran
- Laneh and Charmin near Lumar
- Chaman-Ghir and Sivan near Mishkhas.

List of highest summits in Ilam province
Peak	Elevation (m)	Elevation (ft)
Kan Seifi	2775	9104
Manesht	2629	8625
Chaman Ghir	2578	8458
Qolarangh	2473	8114
Ghachan	2464	8084
Bankoul	2304	7559
Melinjeh	2193	7195
Shalam	2174	7133
Sameleh	2150	7054

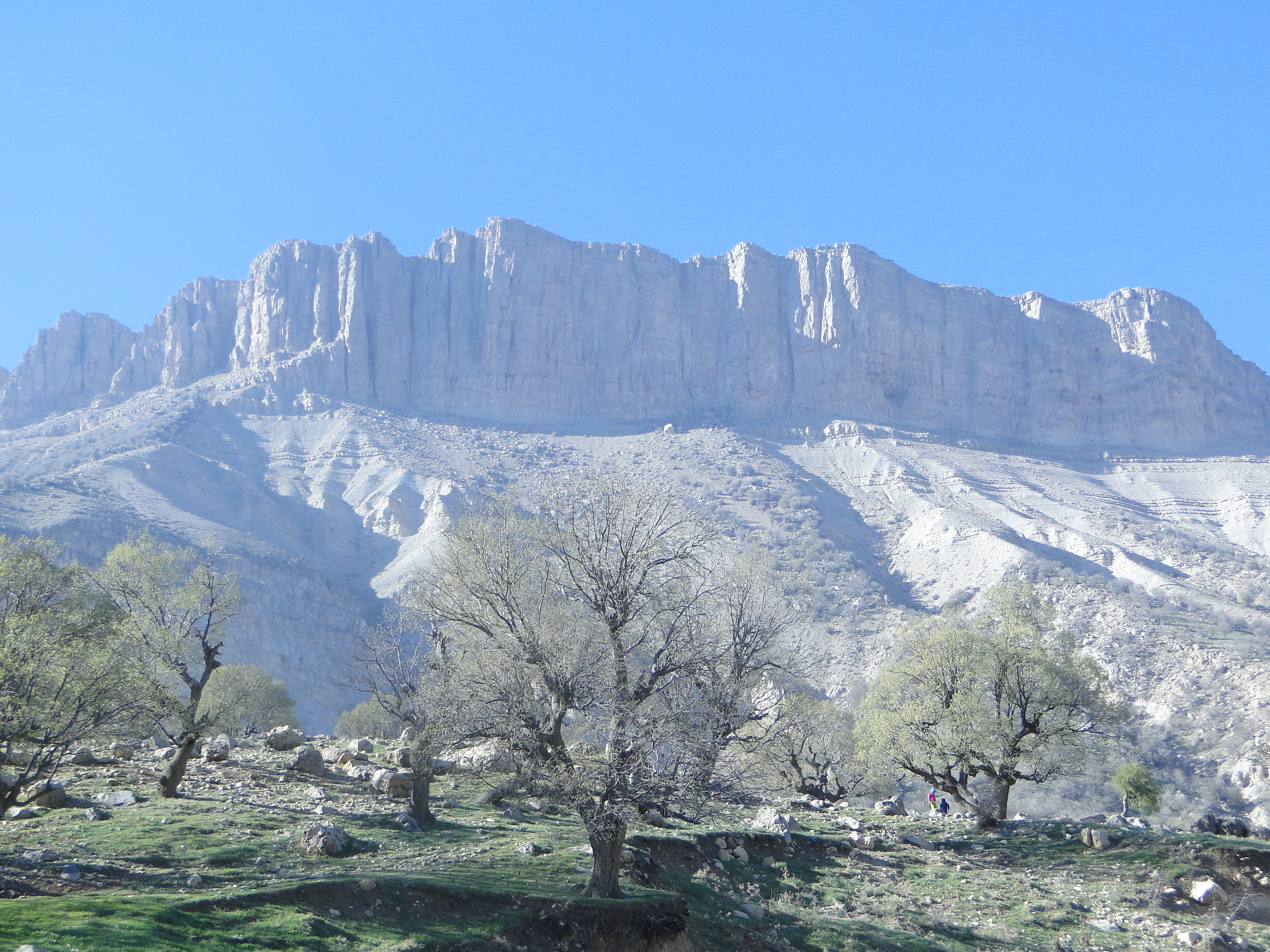
Manesht mountain

Contrary to the north, the south and southwestern part of the province is covered with low-lying plains with elevation varying between 50 and 300 m (160 and 980 ft) above sea level. Despite receiving little precipitation, large areas of these low lands, notably Dehloran, Musian and Dasht Abbas, are cultivated owing to a combination of factors such as rivers flowing from the mountains to the east, dams and irrigation networks.

The Ghamasiab river, after running through Kermanshah province, flows toward Ilam. Upon arriving at the point where the borders of Ilam, Lorestan and Kermanshah provinces meet, it is named Seymareh. It then flows west and southward and somewhere near Kal Sefid Village, Darreh Shahr, is joined by the Kashkan river and together they create the Karkheh river, the third longest river in Iran with a length of around 755 km. Seymareh and Karkheh constitute the Ilam's eastern border with Lorestan province.

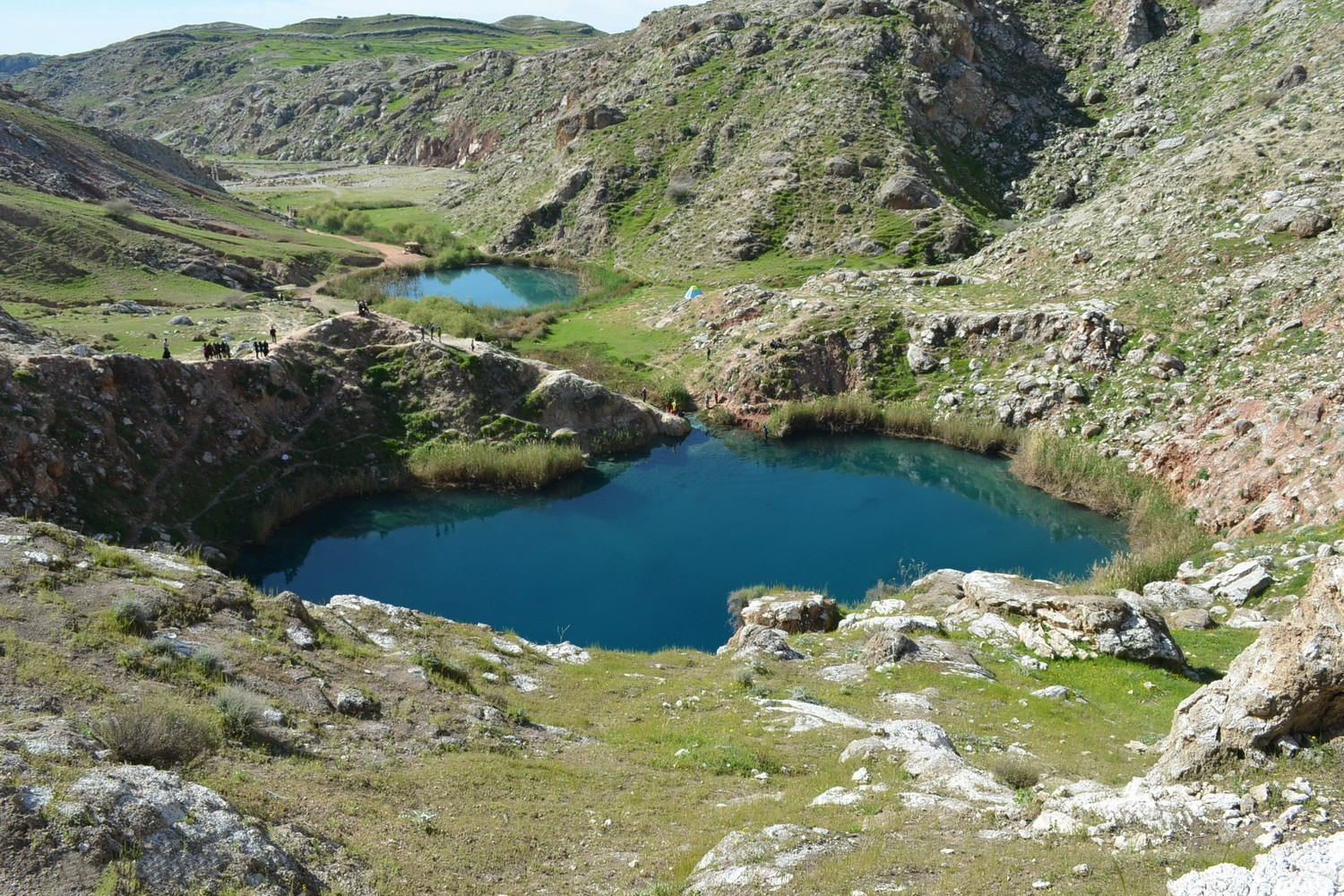
Siah-Ghav Twin Lakes, near Abdanan

Because of the terrain, the permanent and seasonal rivers and stream that originate from Ilam highlands either fall into Seymareh, such as Chardavol, Garab, Seekan, Darreh Shahr and Majeen rivers; or, flow westward toward the low lands and into Iraq and Khuzestan, such as Ghanghir, Ghodar-Khosh, Kanjan-Cham, Roud Ghavi, Changouleh Meymeh, Murmuri, Doiraj and Siah Ghav rivers.

Apart from some few springs here and there, such as Siah-Ghav Twin Lakes near Abdanan, there are no major natural bodies of water in the province. There are, however, four dam that provide important drinking water, these include Ilam, Seymareh, Eywan and Doiraj dams.

=== Biodiversity ===
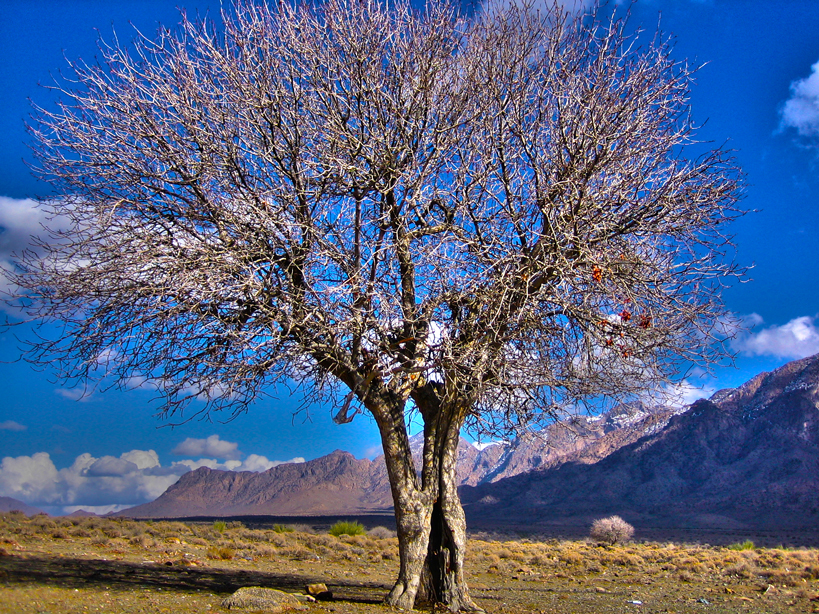
Persian turpentine tree

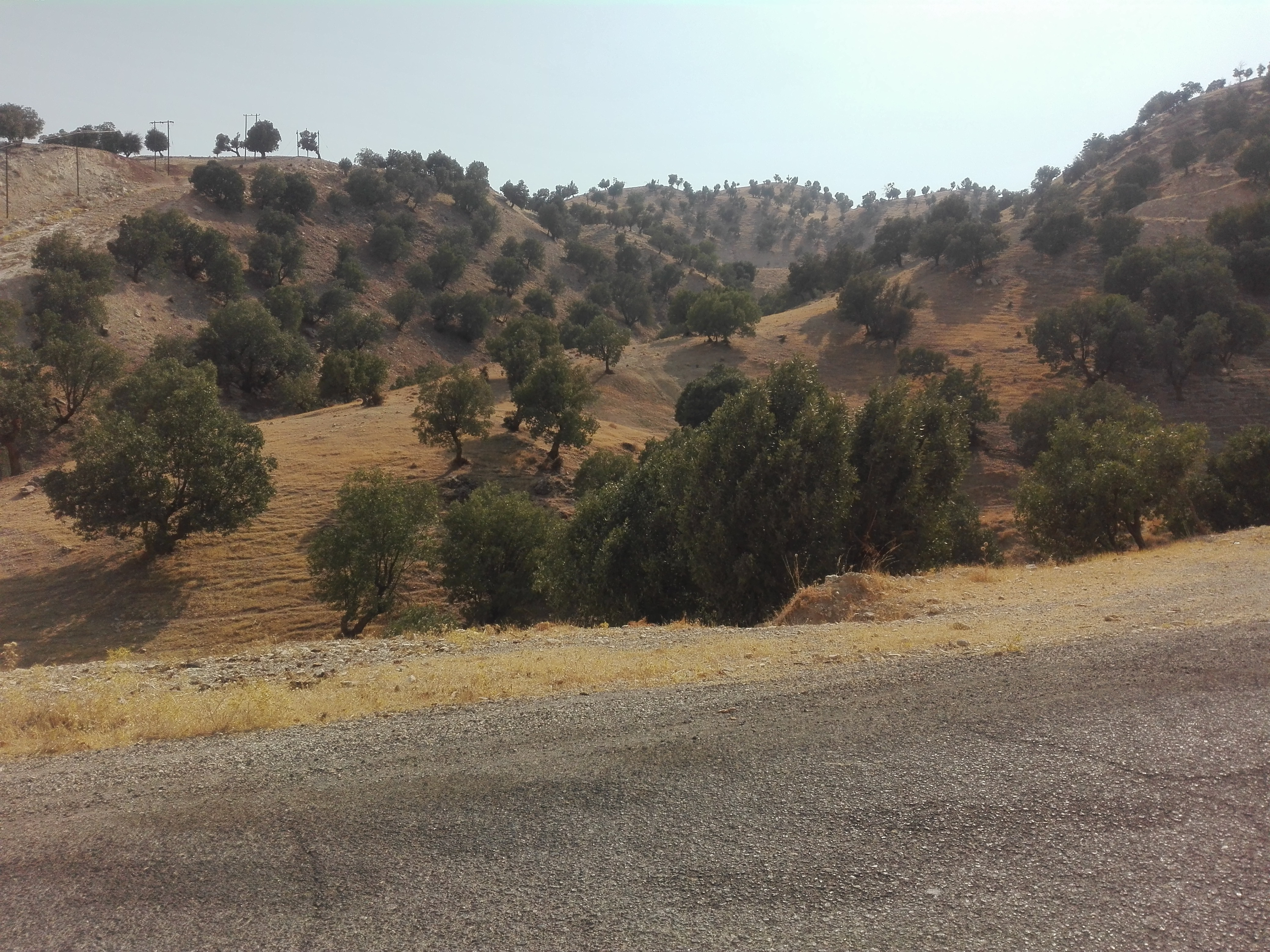
Persian oak forest in Ilam province

==== Flora ====
With about 31% of its territory covered with scattered to dense forests of mostly Persian oak, Ilam ranks 3rd in the country after Kohgiluyeh and Lorestan provinces, excluding the northern provinces of Mazandarn and Gilan. The highlands and the forests of the province are the habitat of many animals including the Asian black bear, Caracal, Caucasian squirrel, Eastern imperial eagle, Golden eagle, Black kite, Black stork, Blunt-nosed viper, and the endangered Persian leopard. Ilam is home to the endangered Spider-tailed horned viper, a unique species only found in Ilam province in the world.

More than 6,400 km^{2} (2,500 mi^{2}) of the province, around 31% of its territory, is covered with scattered to dense forests. This is about one third of the total forests in the Zagros Mountains. The predominant species of these forests are Persian oak, though other trees such as wild almond, hawthorn, Persian turpentine, Montpellier maple and Judas can be found.

The Arghavan Canyon near Ilam is known for the pink blooms of the Judas-trees, which flower in Spring.

==== Fauna ====
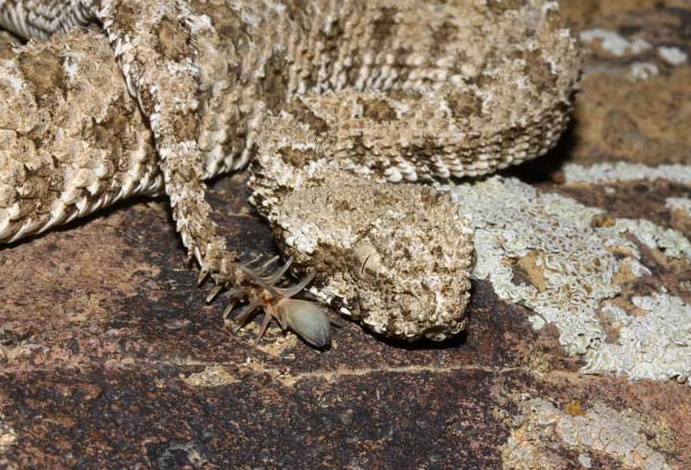
Spider-tailed horned viper

Due to its geographical location, natural conditions and the diversity of its habitats, Ilam province is home to 32 mammals and 183 birds. The mountainous areas, specifically, host mammals such as:

- wild goat, Asiatic mouflon, Argali, goitered gazelle
- the endangered Persian leopard and Asiatic cheetah
- as well as Caracal, Eurasian lynx, Asian black bear, Brown bear, wolf, Golden jackal, Red fox and wild boar
- smaller species such as Caucasian squirrel, rabbits, Long-eared hedgehog, European hedgehog, Indian crested porcupine and weasels.

Ilam province is only area in the world in which the spider-tailed horned viper can be found.

=== Nature conservatories ===
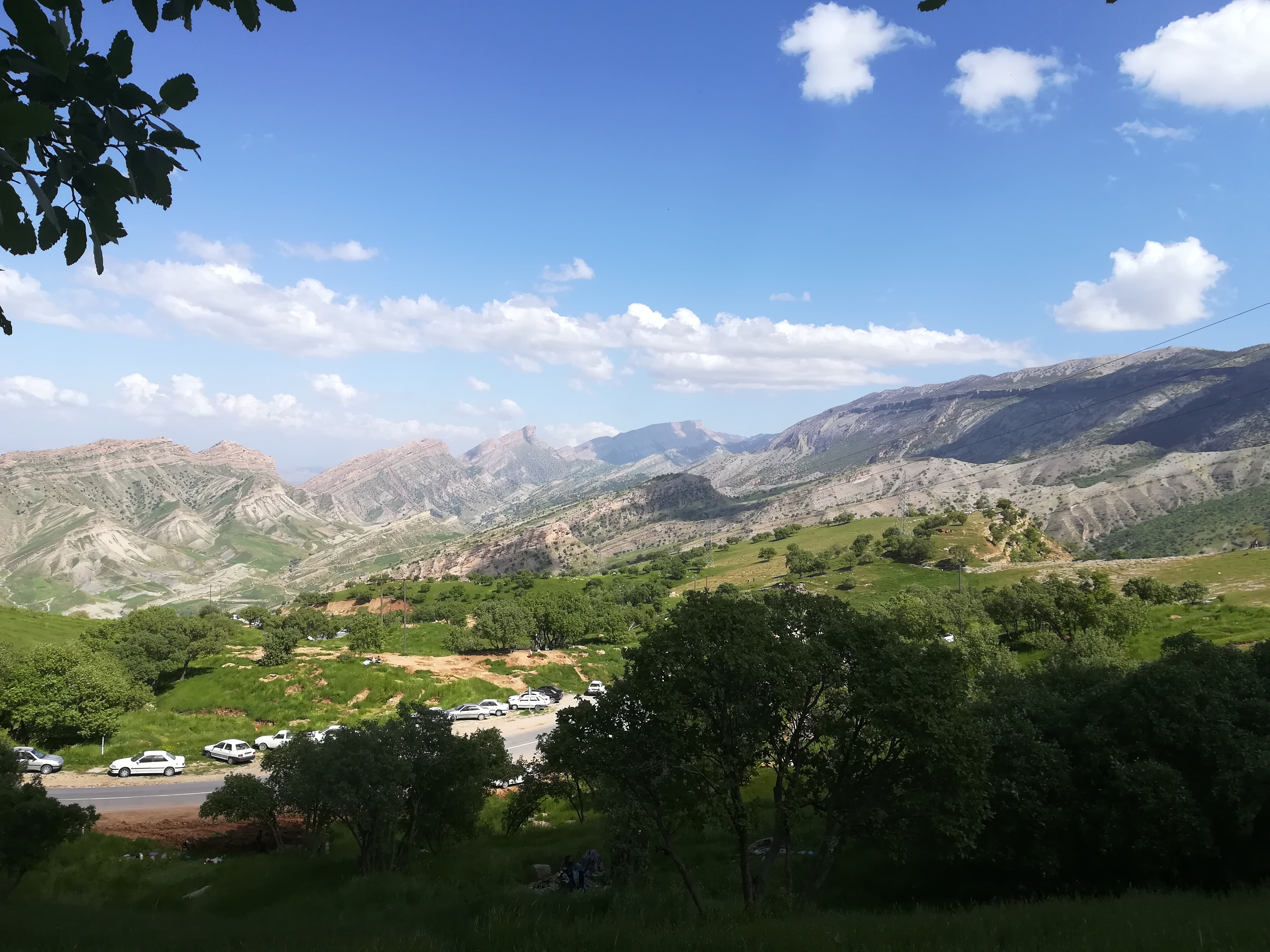
Kabir Kouh Protected Area, near Darreh Shahr

About 13% of the total territory of Ilam province is under the protection and monitoring of local and national natural reserves organizations. There are four protected areas, which in total, cover 1,377 km^{2} (532 mi^{2}):

List of protected areas in Ilam province
Name	Designation	Closest community	Area
Kabir Kouh	Protected area	Darreh Shahr	179 km^{2} (69 mi^{2})
Dinar Kouh	Protected area	Abdanan	406 km^{2} (157 mi^{2})
Manesht and Qolarangh	Protected area	Ilam	292 km^{2} (113 mi^{2})
Koulak	Protected area	Mehran	500 km^{2} (190 mi^{2})

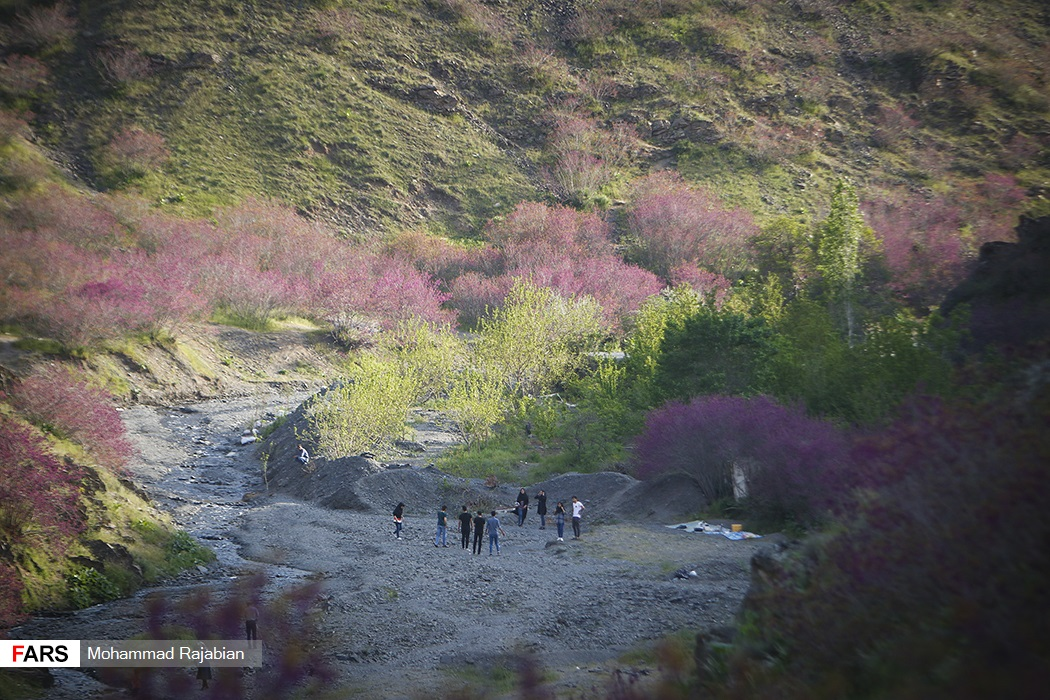
Arghavan valley near Ilam

In addition to the protected areas mentioned above, there are:

- Tang-e Bina and Bijar hunting prohibited area: around 500 km^{2} (190 mi^{2}) in area, near Chavar;
- Arghavan Valley forest reserve near Ilam city: known for its pink spring blossoms of Judas tree; and,
- Largh forest reserve: known for its Pterocarya fraxinifolia trees. These trees are usually found in the rain forests of Northern Iran, but surprisingly grow in this small patch of land in "Lart Valley" near Badreh.

And two nationally registered natural heritage sites:

- Razyaneh Canyon: a deep and narrow canyon carved by streams in the rock beds near Chenar Bashi, 10 to 30 m (33 to 98 ft) deep, 2 to 10 m (6.6 to 32.8 ft) in width, 1.5 km (0.93 mi) long; and,
- Dehloran: an 1,400 ha (3,500 acres) area near Dehloran that includes hot water and bitumen springs, as well as 'bat caves'.

=== Landslides ===
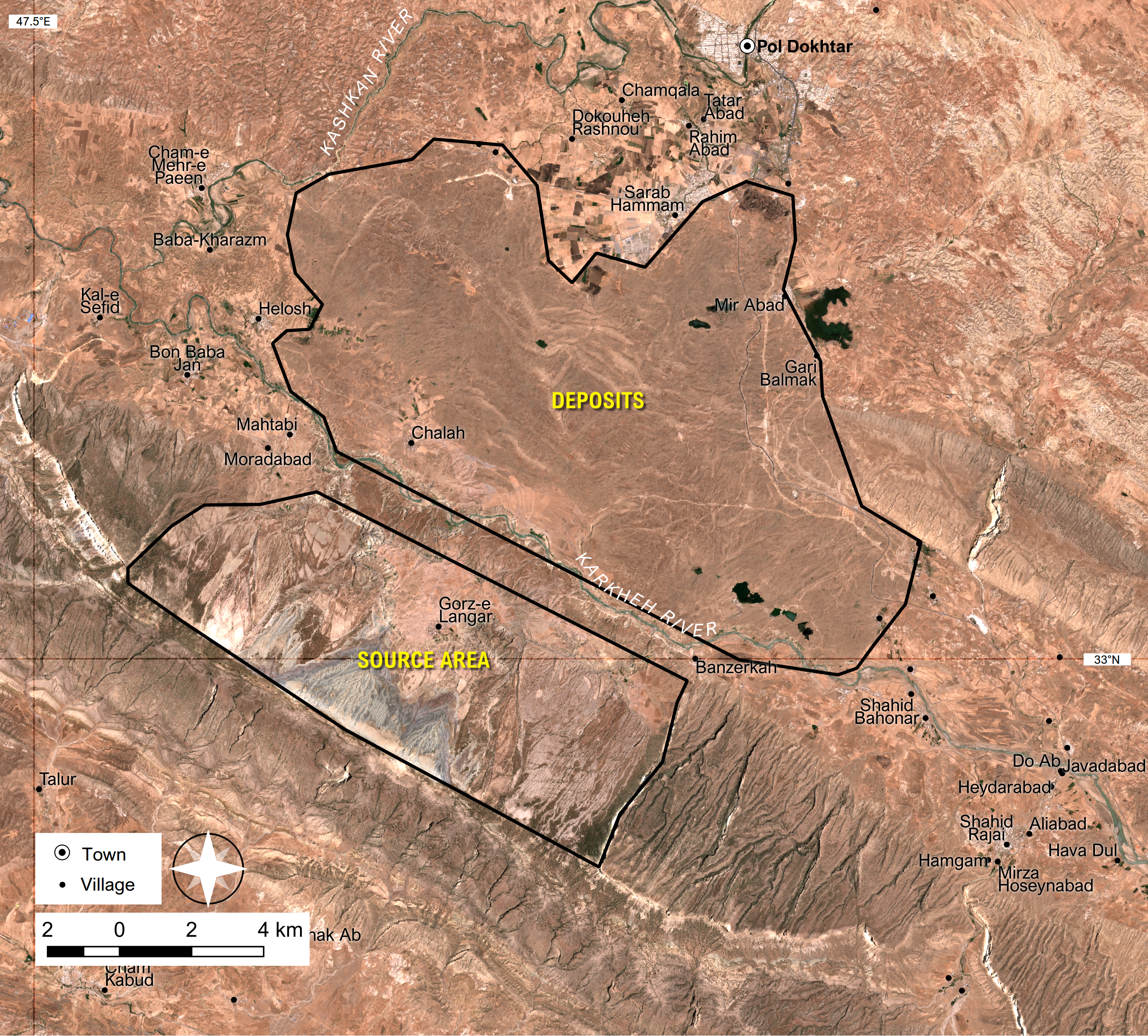
Seymareh Landslide in Darreh Shahr County

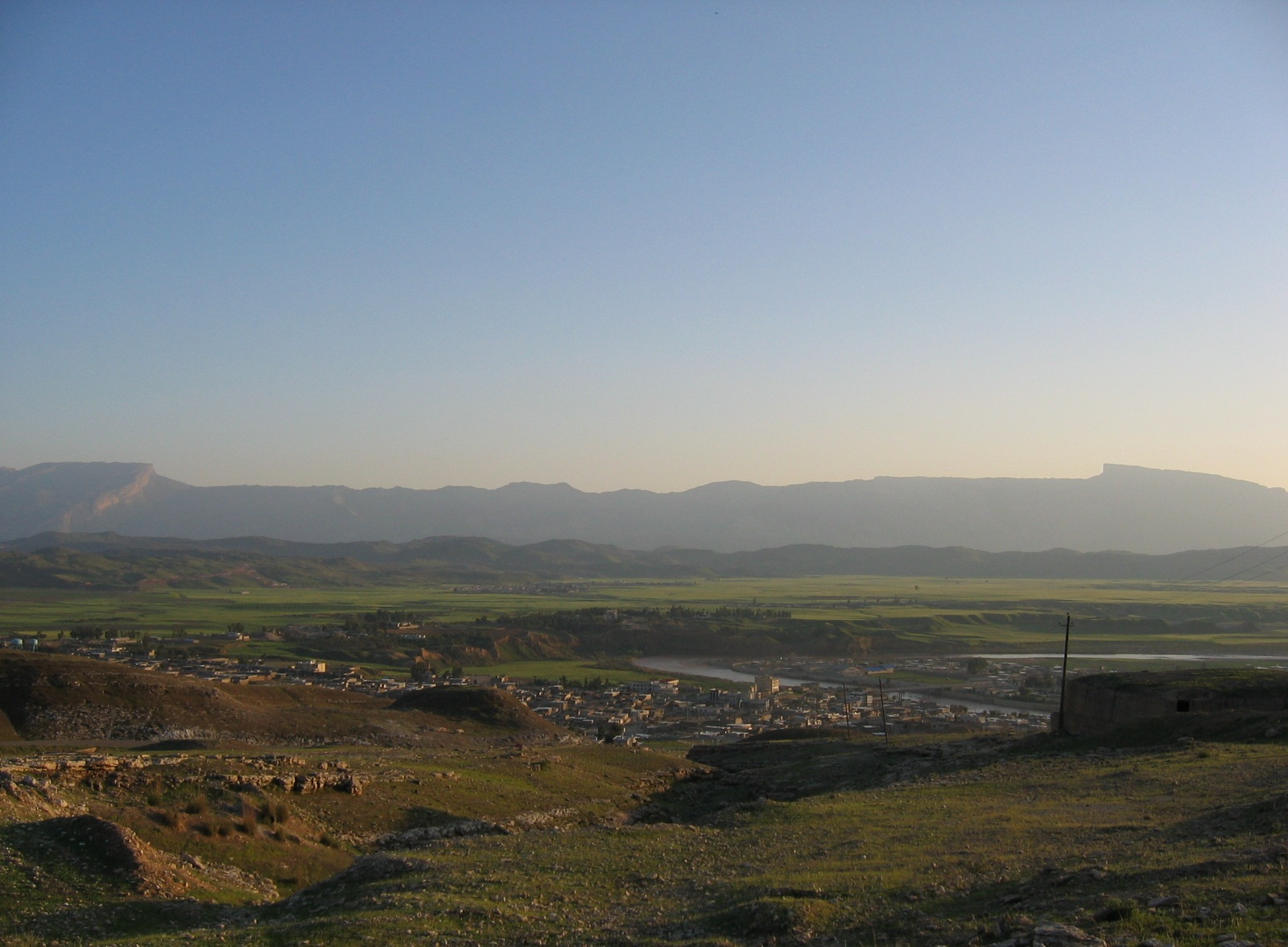
View from Pol-e Dokhtar in Lorestan to the landslide scarp on the Kabir Kouh range; below is the landslide mass that crossed the river Seymareh, which now represents the border between Ilam and Lorestan

One of the largest landslides in the eastern hemisphere and world is believed to have occurred in Ilam Province, more specifically, in the Kabir Kuh anticline at Gorz-e Langar in Darreh Shahr county. According to Harrison and Falcon in their article on Royal Geographical Society, published in 1937, the Seymareh landslide moved as much as 30 km^{3} (7.2 mi^{3}) of rock as far as 14 km (8.7 mi). It is suspected that an earthquake could have triggered such a large landslide.

=== Climate ===
Köppen climate types of Ilam province

Due to the influence of various factors such as altitude, proximity to the Arabian desert, the plains of Khuzestan and Iraq, the climate of the province is very diverse.

Different atmospheric systems affect the province, causing fall, winter, spring, and occasionally summer precipitation. The Mediterranean and Black Sea air masses from the west, trigger autumn and winter rains in the province.

The Red Sea and Saudi desert currents, too, bring winter and spring rains. The very same currents and the vast Iraqi plain to the west are the main causes of hot weather in summers. On the other hand, the northern air masses entering the country in winter from Siberia lower the temperatures and cause freezing in northern parts of the province.

Ilam province is considered as one of the tropical regions of the country, but due to difference in altitudes, temperature and precipitation, three different types of climate can be observed:

- Mountainous areas of the north and northeast, which have cold climate and long winters. The minimum temperature in winter reaches −15 to −20 °C (5 – −4 °F) and the amount of precipitation exceeds 600 mm (24 in) per year.
- The plains of the west and southwest of the province have dry hot climate. The maximum temperature in these areas can exceed 52 °C (126 °F). The rainfall in these areas is about 200 mm (7.9 in) per year.
- Other areas have temperature to warm climate with hot summers and mild winters. Temperatures can go as low as −15 °C (5 °F) in higher altitudes and in summers it can go above 45 °C (113 °F) in lower altitudes. Annual precipitation in these areas varies between 200 mm (7.9 in) and 450 mm (18 in).

Climate averages for towns in Ilam province
Town	July daily maximum	January daily maximum	Annual precipitation
Ilam	38.2 °C (100.8 °F)	10.5 °C (50.9 °F)	585.4 mm (23.05 in)
Mehran	45.6 °C (114.1 °F)	16.3 °C (61.3 °F)	230.4 mm (9.07 in)
Dehloran	48.1 °C (118.6 °F)	16.5 °C (61.7 °F)	280.4 mm (11.04 in)
Darreh Shahr	46.4 °C (115.5 °F)	15 °C (59 °F)	482.1 mm (18.98 in)
Eyvan	38.8 °C (101.8 °F)	11 °C (52 °F)	704.1 mm (27.72 in)
Sarableh	41.4 °C (106.5 °F)	11.2 °C (52.2 °F)	510.7 mm (20.11 in)
Abdanan	42.5 °C (108.5 °F)	12.9 °C (55.2 °F)	613.7 mm (24.16 in)
Lumar	45.2 °C (113.4 °F)	13.2 °C (55.8 °F)	460.3 mm (18.12 in)

=== Floods ===
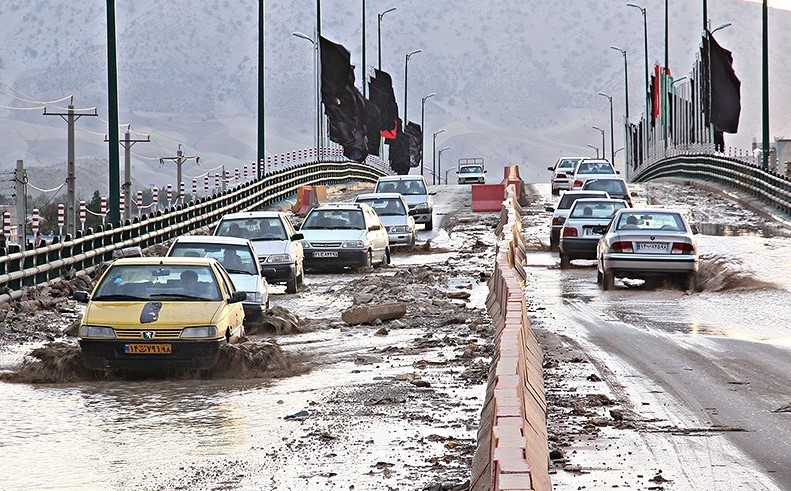
Flood of Nov 2015 city of Ilam.

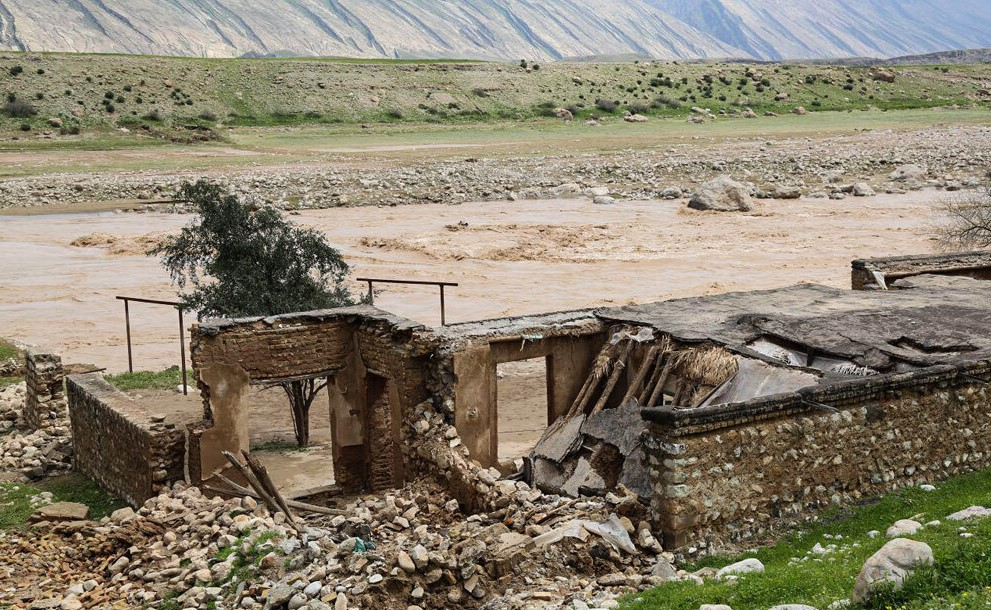
Flood of 31 March 2019 at Majeen, Darreh Shahr

Occasional heavy rainstorms in spring and autumn bring, sometimes, huge floods. The steep slopes of the Zagros Mountains, soil type, lack of vegetation are among some of the reasons why Ilam province is prone to flooding. Moreover, majority of communities in Ilam province are located in the floodplains, at the foothills of mountains, on river banks and near sources of water, so there is always risk of flooding with potential human and financial costs. According to the available statistics, Mehran and Dehloran counties are at the highest risk of flooding due to their lower elevation compared to the rest of the province and the subsequent concentration and joining of rivers and streams.

The latest flood happened in March and April 2019, in which most of country, including Ilam province, experienced levels of flooding. On 1 April 2019, the flood destructed many bridges including the Gavmishan bridge in Darreh Shahr, an important bridge over Karkheh River which connects south of the province to Lorestan and rest of the country. The bridge was reopened months later on 6 October 2019.

=== Dust ===
Ilam is occasionally affected by dust, especially in summers. It has become more frequent in the last ten years. The cities of Mehran and Dehloran are at the highest risk in the province, due to lower elevation and proximity to the deserts of Iraq and Saudi Arabia. However, in case of large dust storms, the western part of the country could be affected. The successive droughts of the recent decade in Iran and the long wars in Iraq and Syria have also exacerbated the issue.

== Demographics ==
=== Language and ethnicity ===
Ilam Province has a diverse linguistic presence, albeit having the smallest population in Iran. This diversity derives from the geographical location of the province, positioned in the transitional zone between Kurdish and the Southwestern Iranian language bloc. The predominant language is Kurdish, more specifically the Southern Kurdish dialects Kalhori, Elami, Malekshahi, Laki and the Khezeli dialect closely related to Laki. Kurdish is the dominant language in the cities of Ilam, Mehran, Eyvan, Abdanan, Sarableh, Lumar and Pahleh, and Cheshmeh-ye Shirin Shah Ahmad is the southern-most Kurdish-speaking settlement in the province.

Laki is the predominant language of Darreh Shahr County. Luri and Kurdish are also spoken in parts of the county.

Luri is spoken in the southern parts of the province and is the predominant language in Murmuri, Haft Cheshmeh and many smaller villages. Two linguistically distinctive Luri dialects called Hinimini and Shuhani are also spoken in the province. Shahrak-e Changuleh is the largest Shuhani-speaking settlement, while Hinimini is spoken in and around Zarangush.

Arabic is spoken in smaller settlements near the border to Khuzestan Province including in Shahrak-e Zu ol Faqari.

Ilam linguistic composition
language	percent
Kurdish	80.66%
Luri	14.74%
Arabic	3.43%
Other	1.16%

==== Kurdish tribes ====
The north is mostly inhabited by the Kurdish Feyli tribes. The Feyli tribes include the Malekshahi, Khezel, Arkawâzi, Kalhor, Beyrey, Shuhan, Lak, Zand and Ali Sherwan tribes.

=== Religion ===
As of 2011, 99.62% of the population are Muslim.

=== Population ===
Ilam Province Historical population
Year	Pop.	±%
1956	110,067	—
1966	148,307	+34.7%
1976	246,024	+65.9%
1986	382,091	+55.3%
1991	440,693	+15.3%
1996	487,886	+10.7%
2006	545,787	+11.9%
2011	557,599	+2.2%
2016	580,158	+4.0%
Est. 2020	602,000	+3.8%
Notes: As Ilam Census Area in 1956 and Ilam General Governorate in 1966. Source: Statistical Center of Iran

At the time of the 2006 National Census, the province's population was 530,464 in 110,515 households. The following census in 2011 counted 557,599 people in 135,499 households. The 2016 census measured the population of the province as 580,158 people in 159,310 households. Ilam is presently the least populated province in Iran.

=== Administrative divisions ===
The province of Ilam is divided into 12 counties, 28 districts and 52 rural districts. Following the approval of the government cabinet, Holeylan County was established on 4 January 2020, having been a district of Chardavol County prior to that, becoming the 11th county of the province. Chavar District was separated from Ilam County and elevated to county status.

The population history and structural changes of Ilam province's administrative divisions over three consecutive censuses are shown in the following table.

Ilam Province
Counties	2006	2011	2016
Abdanan	45,830	46,977	47,851
Badreh (Note: Separated from Darreh Shahr County after the 2011 census)	—	—	15,614
Chardavol	73,422	72,167	57,381
Chavar (Note: Separated from Ilam County)	—	—	—
Darreh Shahr	56,346	59,551	43,708
Dehloran	58,993	66,399	65,630
Eyvan	47,380	48,833	49,491
Holeylan (Note: Separated from Chardavol County after the 2016 census)	—	—	—
Ilam	193,222	213,579	235,144
Malekshahi (Note: Separated from Mehran County after the 2011 census)	—	22,587	21,138
Mehran	55,271	27,506	29,797
Sirvan (Note: Separated from Chardavol County after the 2011 census)	—	—	14,404
Total	530,464	557,599	580,158

=== Cities ===
According to the 2016 census, 395,263 people (over 68% of the population of Ilam province) live in the following cities:

City	Population
Abdanan	23,946
Arkavaz	11,977
Asemanabad	6,280
Badreh	4,278
Balavah	264
Chavar	5,831
Darrehshahr	21,900
Dehloran	32,941
Delgosha	1,819
Eyvan	31,299
Ilam	194,030
Lumar	2,696
Majin	1,512
Mehr	1,060
Mehran	17,435
Meymeh	1,913
Murmuri	3,768
Musian	2,459
Pahleh	3,870
Salehabad	1,751
Sarabbagh	2,659
Sarableh	12,393
Shabab	4,088
Towhid	2,128
Zarneh	2,966

Ilam province is the least populated province in Iran. Ilam, the provincial capital, has a population of 194,030; All other towns have less than 35,000 population.

List of cities above 10k population
Rank	Town	Pop.
1	Ilam	194,030
2	Dehloran	32,941
3	Eyvan	31,299
4	Abdanan	23,946
5	Darrehshahr	21,900
6	Mehran	17,435
7	Sarableh	12,393
8	Arkavaz	11,977

== Culture ==
The original inhabitants of Ilam were the Guitians and the Kassites, and with the arrival of the Aryans in Iran, the Medes settled in the Zagros region. Throughout history, many people have settled and ruled in the region and as the result, today, Ilam is inhabited by Kurds, Lurs, and Arabs. For the same reasons, the culture of the Ilamians is diverse, mostly a blend of many cultures.

=== Handicrafts ===
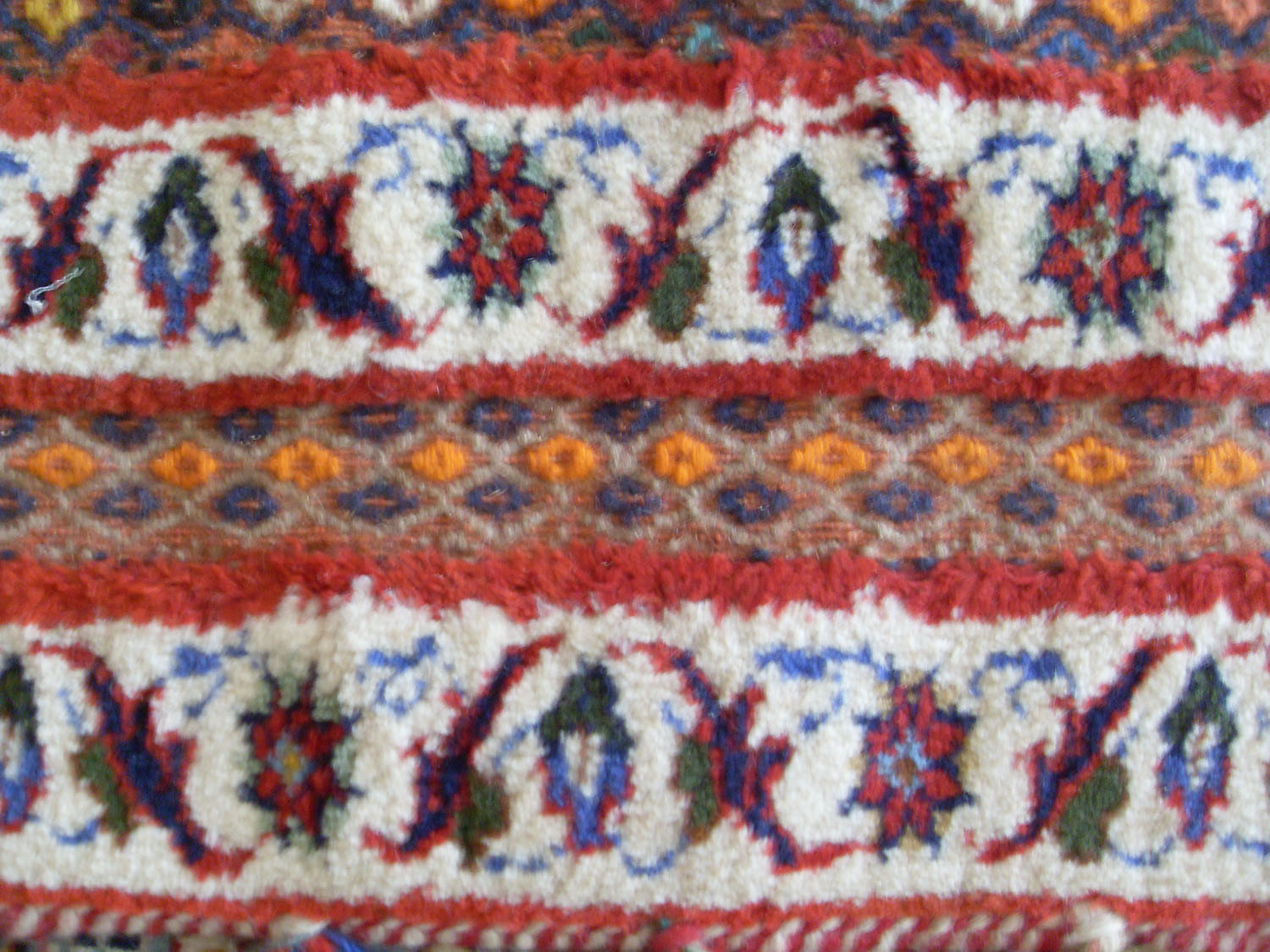
Kilim, a handicraft popular in Ilam

Embossed kilim is a combination of simple kilim and carpet knot in its text, which is considered as the most important and original handicraft in Ilam province. Ilam's embossed kilim is different from other parts of the country. Upon its creation by Sahar Chalanghar, a resident of Zanjireh village of Sarableh county, Ilam's embossed kilim became popular both in Iran and the world. Now, there are more than 4,500 weavers of this specific type of kilim in Ilam province, producing around 3,000m^{2} annually. It is estimated that around 50% of those involved in all handicrafts work in Ilam province are in the field of kilim production.

"Ilam's embossed kilim" is different from other parts of the country because a weaver named "Sahar Chalangar", a resident of Zanjireh village (one of the functions of Sarablah city of Ilam province), succeeds in performing a prominent role in a part of his woven kilim by using a carpet knot. From this, a background is provided for the growth and promotion of embossed kilims. Ilam's embossed kilim has received a national hologram and has been registered as a souvenir and brand of Ilam province. Ilam was subsequently appointed as the national capital of embossed kilim.

=== Cuisine ===
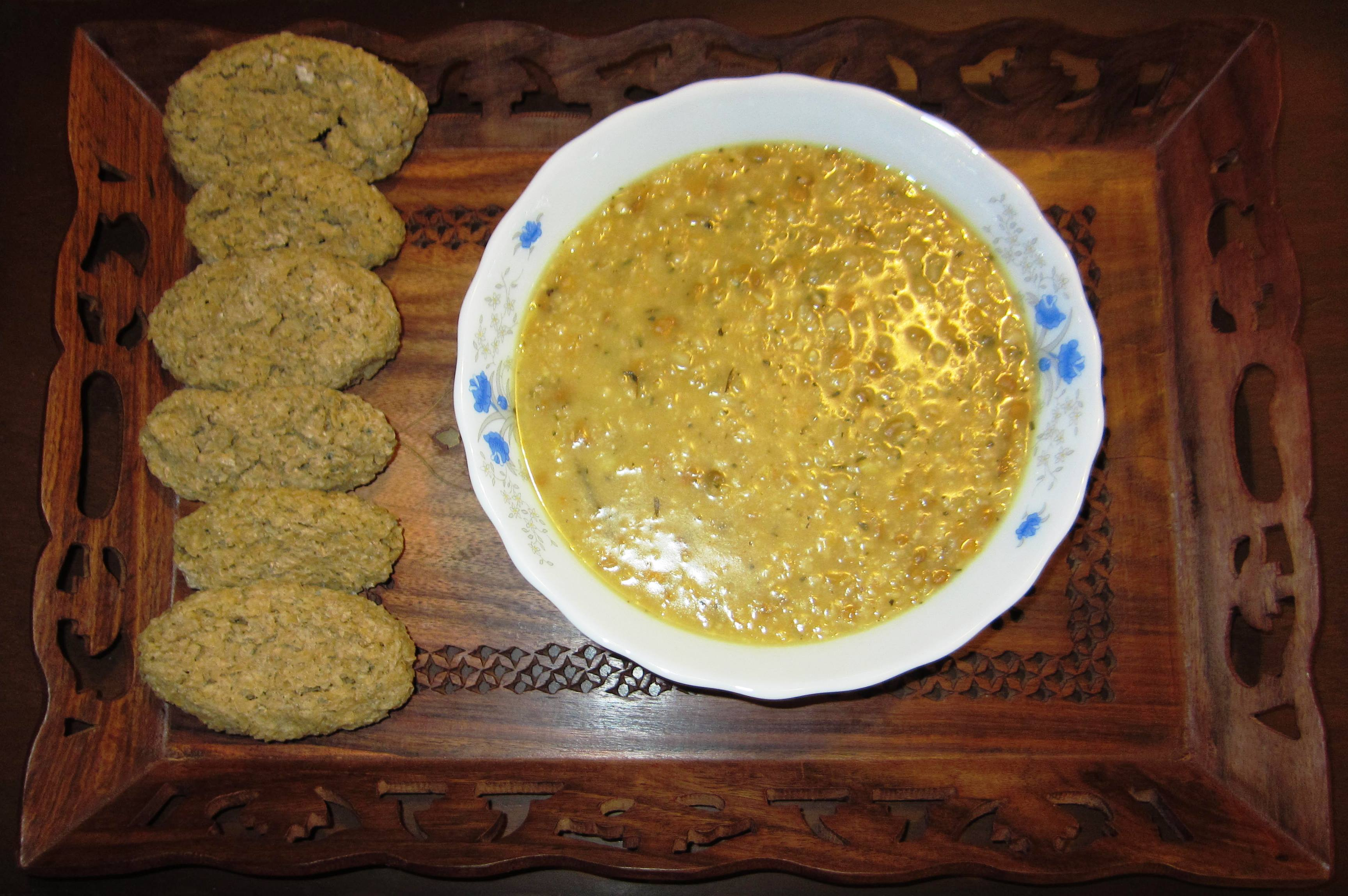
Tarkhineh, a traditional dish in Ilam

Ilam's cuisine, like its culture is a blend of Kurdish and Luri cuisines. Some of the local traditional dishes are:

- Bersaq
- Kala-Konji
- Tarkhineh
- Chezenak-Reqo
- Shola-Keena
- Mountain Leek Stew
- Kangar
- Jeghar-Vaz
- Saj bread
- Qala Masoua
- Qoyerma
- Makash

== Government ==
The highest government authority of the province is the governor-general, who is appointed by the Minister of Interior given cabinet approval. The governor-general, subsequently appoints county governors. The incumbent governor-general is Qasem Soleimani Dashtaki, who has been in office since October 2017.

== Economy ==
With about 0.99% contribution to the national GDP as of 2016, Ilam is one of the least developed provinces in Iran, ranked 26th out of 31. Most economic activities in the province are focused on agriculture and animal husbandry in the rural communities; and, skilled trades, public and private services in urban areas. The industry has a small share in the economy of the province and there are few factories.

=== Agriculture ===
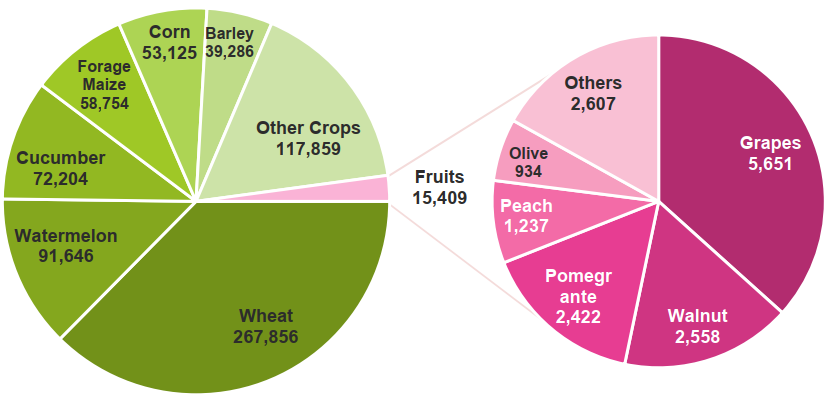
Production of crops and fruits in Ilam province as of 2018. Crops: 700,732 tons (97.8%) Fruits: 15,409 tons (2.2%)

The largest sector of Ilam's economy is agriculture, though much smaller compared to other provinces of Iran. There are more than 55,000 farmers in Ilam province. It is estimated that, about 50% of all households in the province are either directly or indirectly involved in agricultural activities.

In the 2018 harvest year, 223,228 hectares (551,610 acres) of land (11.1% of the territory of Ilam province) were cultivated for various crops such as wheat, barley, forage maize, corn, watermelon, melon and cucumber, producing 700,732 tons of produce in total, 14% through dry farming. Ilam is the bottom 3rd province in the country in terms of crop yield at 3.14 tons per hectare, only surpassing Kohgiluyeh and Kurdestan. For comparison, the average yield is 9.88 tons per hectare and highest is 25.64 tons per hectare in Alborz province.

The farming lands of Ilam, like its geography, are divided; The northern and eastern parts of the province are mountainous and despite the presence of water resources, cultivable lands are limited to inter-mountain plains, foothills and river banks; On the contrary, the hot climate plains of the south and southwest such as Hojandan-Dasht, Amir-Abad, Mehran, Mosian, Dehloran and Dasht-Abbas, are large in size but limited in water resources.

As of 2019, the total area of all orchards in Ilam province was 3,950 ha (9,800 acres), making it the last in the country. In total, these orchards produced 15,409 tons of fruits, or 0.1% of the country's production. The most grown horticultural products are: grapes, walnut, pomegranate, peach, olive and fig.

=== Industry ===
Top and bottom three province of Iran in term of number of industrial workshops (as of 2017).
Rank. Province	Count
1. Tehran	6,806
2. Isfahan	3,892
3. R. Khorasan	2,164
29. S. Khorasan	139
30. Kohgiluyeh	65
31. Ilam	52

The industry sector of Ilam's economy is poorly-developed even non-existent; As of 2017, the total number of industrial workshops (ten or more employees) in the province is just 52, 85% of which have under 50 employees. These workshops have 3,350, almost completely (96%) male, employees in total, accounting to a mere 0.6% of Ilam's population. As a comparison, the number of the same type of workshops is 6,806 for Tehran and 3,892 for Isfahan provinces, indicating how underdeveloped Ilam's industry sector is. According to the latest statistics, Ilam is the least industrial province in Iran. In recent years, some efforts went into stimulating Ilam's industry by building industrial towns and areas, providing encouraging opportunities for businesses such as cheaper land, utilities and tax. Since 2005, 8 such towns and 5 areas have been built.

The largest companies in Ilam province are:

- Ilam Cement Company
- Ilam Petrochemical Company
- Ilam Gas Treating Company
- Madakto Steel Cord
- Sepid Morgh Manesht Industrial Slaughterhouse
- Atena Steel Manufacturing Company
- Ilam Syringe Production Company
- Pouyanakh Thread Manufacturing Company
- Koulak Mineral Water Company
- Several flour companies

=== Energy ===
With an estimated 14 trillion m^{3} of gas reserves and 17 billion barrels of oil reserve, equal to 6% and 11% of Iran's reserves respectively, Ilam ranks 2nd and 3rd in the country in terms of gas and oil. Ilam province produces more than 230,000 barrels of oil per day and 1.5 billion cubic meters of gas per year, accounting to about 90% of western Iran's oil and gas, making Ilam the energy hub of western Iran. The most important oil and gas fields in Ilam are: Dehloran, Tang-e Bijar, Chashmeh Khosh, Paydar-e Gharb, Azar and Danan. Despite the huge oil and gas reserves in the province, there are few downstream processing plants including:

List of down-stream oil and gas processing plants in Ilam province
Operating	Under construction	Planned
Ilam Petrochemical Company, Phase 1; Ilam Gas Treating Company; Chashmeh Khosh Production Unit; Tang-e Bijar Production Unit	Dehloran Petrochemical Company; Ilam Petrochemical Company, Phase 2	Mehran Petrochemical Company; Darreh Shahr Petrochemical Company; Holeilan Petrochemical Company

=== Mining ===
Ilam province is part of the Zagros sedimentary structure and is completely covered with sedimentary rocks of different ages. In other words, there are no phenomena of magmatism and metamorphism in the province. Therefore, the province's metal mineral reserves are negligible. There are, however, substantial non-metallic reserves of gypsum, limestone, sandstone, dolomite, shale, bitumen, celestine, building stone and facade stone. The province's gypsum is more than 99 percent pure and can be found in colossal amounts in Dehloran, Mehran and Bouli of Abdanan. Dehloran Gypsum Factory produces a premium quality product in the country.

The limestone reserves are also very significant in size and very high in purity (93–99.9%). Ilam Cement Factory, founded 1989 to use these mines, produces one of the finest cements in Iran and has won many national and international awards. There are also large amounts of celestine discovered northwest of Dehloran. Celestine is used in oil well drilling industry.

The most valuable mineral in the province is bitumen. It is found as gilsonite and has a purity of more than 70%. Bitumen is found in Eyvan, Dehloran and Malekshahi counties. Ilam province is the 2nd province in the country in terms of production and reserves of bitumen. Eyvan has the largest reserves of bitumen in the province and is considered the largest bitumen mine in the Middle East. Ilam's bitumen reserves are estimated at 465,000 tons proven and likely up to 900,000 tons. In some places in the province, liquid bitumen seeps to the ground and creates springs. "Dehloran Bitumen Spring" is a nationally registered natural monument in Iran.

Salt stone has been recovered in Baloutestan area of Zarin Abad. There's also veins of blue salt excavated near Dashtalak (Mimak) and Majeen (Darreh Shahr).

Given the geology of the province, building stones can also found in large amounts; White and black marble stone have been discovered near the city of Ilam.

About 2.2 million tons of mineral were excavated in 2019 and Ilam's reserves are estimated at around 1 billion tons.

== Education ==
The provincial department of education, in line with the Ministry of Education, supervises elementary and secondary education in the province. Higher education is supervised by the Ministry of Science, Research and Technology (Iran). As of 2019, there were 1778 schools and 112,503 students and 26,804 higher education students. As of 2016, the literacy rate in Ilam province was 89.1% for men and 80.6% for women.

Higher education institutes in Ilam province:

- Ilam University of Medical Sciences
- Ilam University
- Islamic Azad University of Ilam
- Payame Noor University of Ilam
- Farhanghian University of Ilam:
  - Campus of Shahid Modares
  - Campus of Imam Jafar Sadegh
- Technical and Vocational University of Ilam
- University of Applied Science and Technology - Ilam Province Branch
- Bakhtar Higher Institution of Education

== Healthcare ==
As of 2018, Ilam has one of the highest ratios of number of general practitioners to population in the country, ranking 2nd. There are 3.48 GPs per 10,000 population in Ilam province, the average of the country being 2.37. Ilam also has the highest ratio of dentists in the country.

Distribution of medical practitioners in Ilam province

Despite the positively looking statistics when compared with other provinces, the medical facilities and expertise are unequally distributed in Ilam province; Ilam, the capital, serves as the medical hub in the province, hosting majority of hospitals, medical laboratories and specialist: Six of the 12 hospitals in the province; 23 of the 60 medical laboratories; 18 out of the 19 medical nuclear institutes; 123 out of the 189 specialists; all the post-specialist and professional doctorates; 13 out of 14 pharmacologists; and, the only medical university in the province are in Ilam.

The most prominent hospitals of the province are:

- Imam Khomeini Hospital
- Mostafa Khomeini Hospital
- Ayatollah Taleghani Hospital
- Kosar Private Hospital and Maternity Ward
- Ghaem Private Hospital and Maternity Ward

== Transportation ==
=== Air ===
Compared to the rest of the country, Ilam is under-developed in term of transportation. The Ilam Airport is the only airport in the province. With 2850 sorties, 215,799 passengers and around 1,416 metric tons (1,561 short tons), Ilam Airport ranked 21st in the country and 2nd to Kermanshah Airport in the western region. Built in 1996, Ilam Airport has regular flights to Tehran and Mashhad. In 2016, the airport was upgraded to international status (controlled airspace) and started a weekly service to Najaf.

=== Road ===
As of 2019, there are only 179 km (111 mi) of highway in Ilam province:

- Road 17: Connecting Eslamabad-e Gharb to Mehran through Eyvan and Ilam.
- Road 19: Connecting Eslamabad-e Gharb to Road 37 near Pol-e Dokhtar in Lorestan with a small section of it passing through the northeastern bulge of Ilam province, the Chardavol County.
- Road 21: Connecting Ilam to Road 19 at Seymareh Bridge and then to Kermanshah.
- Road 64: Connecting the border city of Mehran to Dehloran and to Road 37 near Andimeshk in Khuzestan.

As of 2019, there were 10 road tunnels in Ilam province, the most important of which are:

- Ghalajeh tunnel: 2,583 m (8,474 ft) long, passing under Qalajeh mountain and the Ilam–Kermanshah border, part of Road 17. Opened in 2019;
- Azadi Tunnel: 1,178 m (3,865 ft) long, near city of Ilam, part of Road 21;
- Rah-e Karbala Tunnel: under construction, part of Road 17;
- Kabir Kouh Tunnel: 6,250 m (20,510 ft) long, making it the longest under-construction tunnel in Iran. It crosses under the Kabir Kouh mountain near cities of Abdanan and Darreh Shahr; and
- Payambare Azam Tunnel

== Sports ==
=== Football ===
Palayesh Gas Ilam Women's football team is the only team in Ilam province competing at the professional level, the Iranian Women's Football Premier League, also known as Kowsar Women Football League.

=== Powerlifting ===
One of the most known athletic figures of Ilam province is Mojtaba Maleki, a two times gold medalist in World Powerlifting Championships in 2017 and 2018. He also has more than ten Asian gold medals. Maleki is the second person in the world to have squatted 500 kg raw with wraps.

== Notable people ==
- Darioush Rezaeinejad, nuclear energy scientist, born in Abdanan (Ilam)
- Navid Mohammadzadeh, Iranian actor
- Mojtaba Maleki, Iranian strongman
- Zabihollah Pourshab, Iranian karateka
- Ali Shadman, Iranian actor
- Said Lotfi, Iranian footballer
- Pouria Norouzian, Iranian sport shooter
- Armina Sadeghian, Iranian sport shooter
- Ali Hashemi, Iranian weightlifter
- Jahangir Asgari, Iranian footballer
- Behrouz Boochani, Iranian-Kurdish writer, filmmaker

== See also ==
- Elam
- Ethnic minorities in Iran
- Faramarz Asadi
- Lake Black Cow
- Ayatollah Abdul Rahman Heidari Ilami
- Ferydoon Hemmati

== Gallery ==
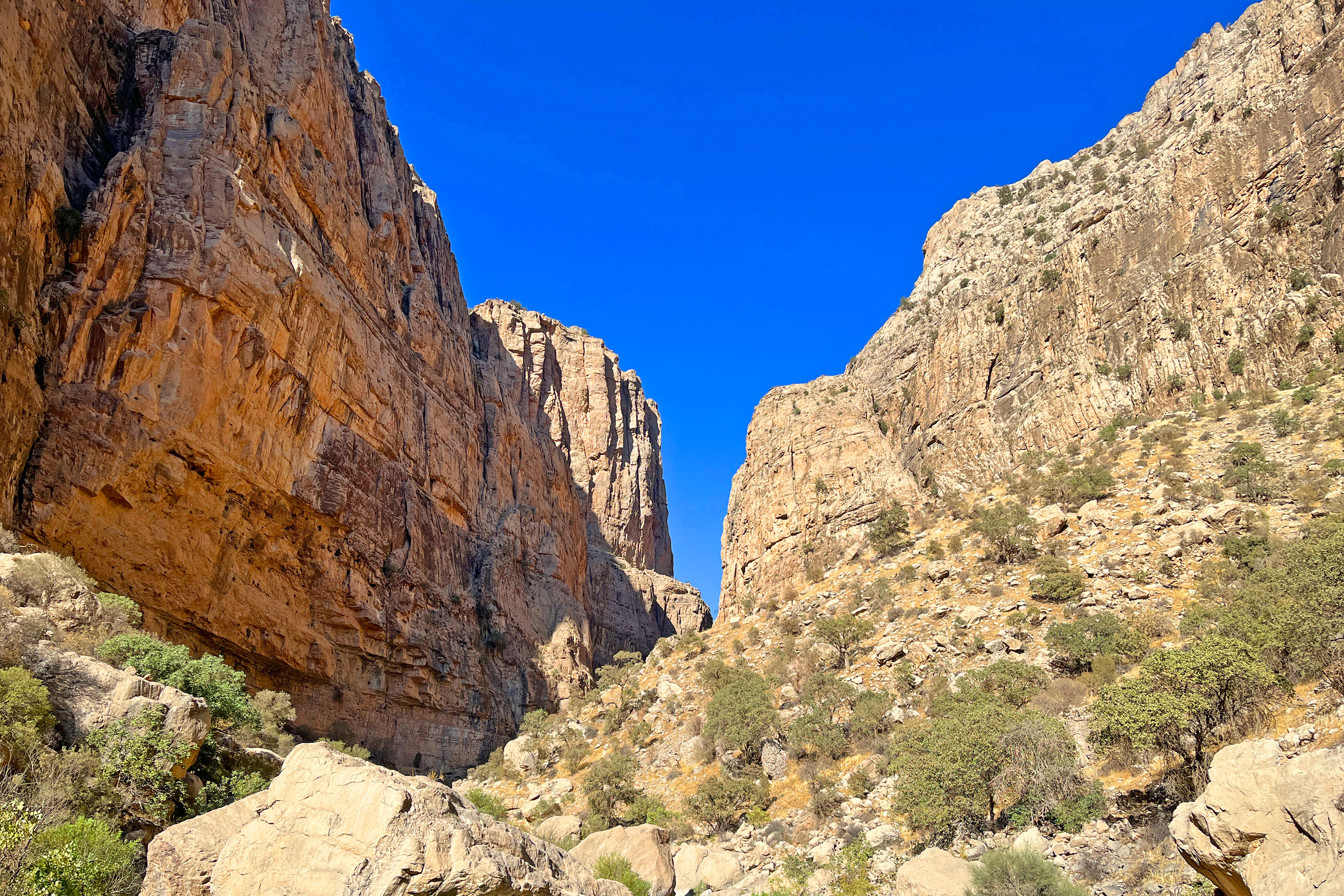
Vizhdarvan Valley

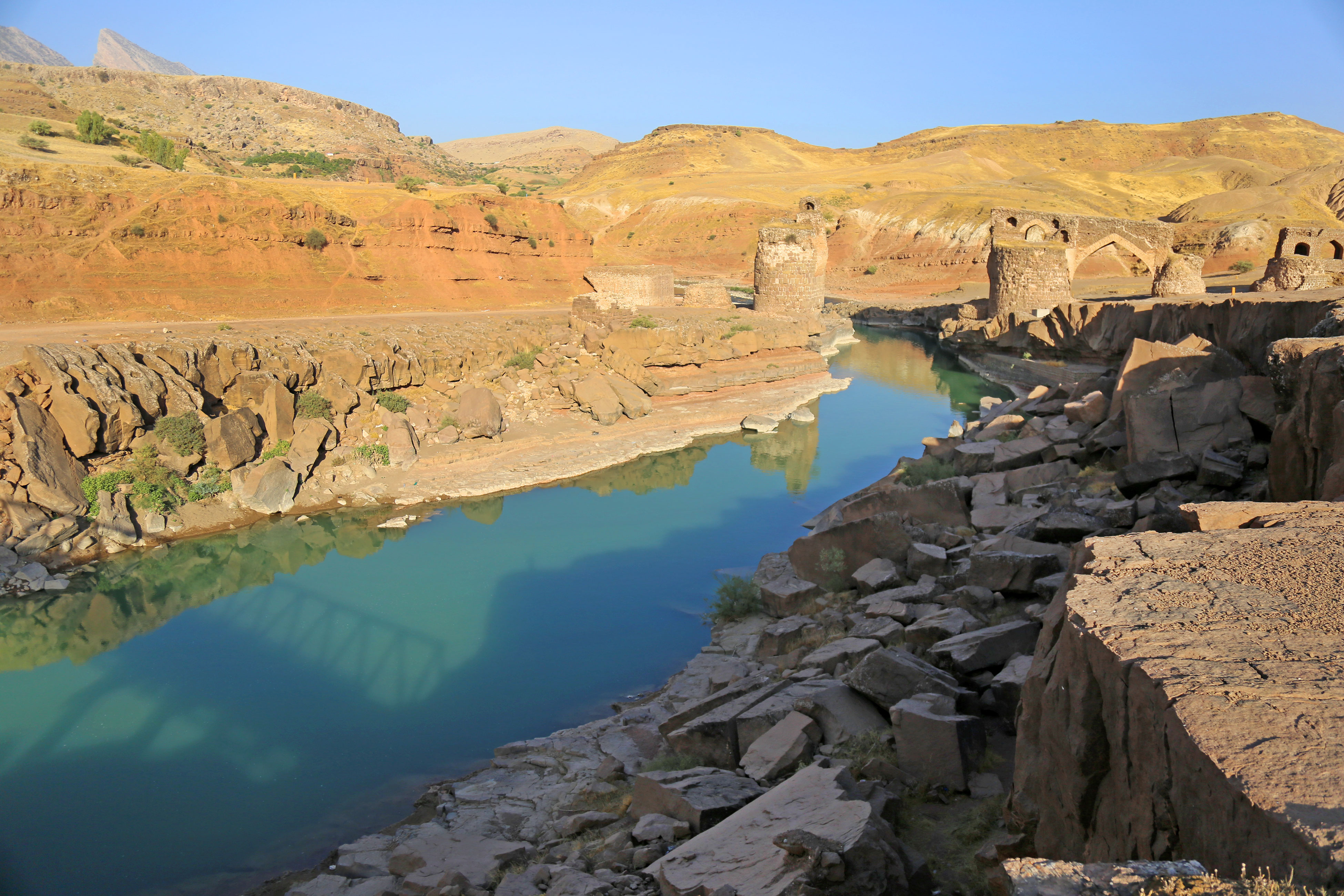
Gavmishan

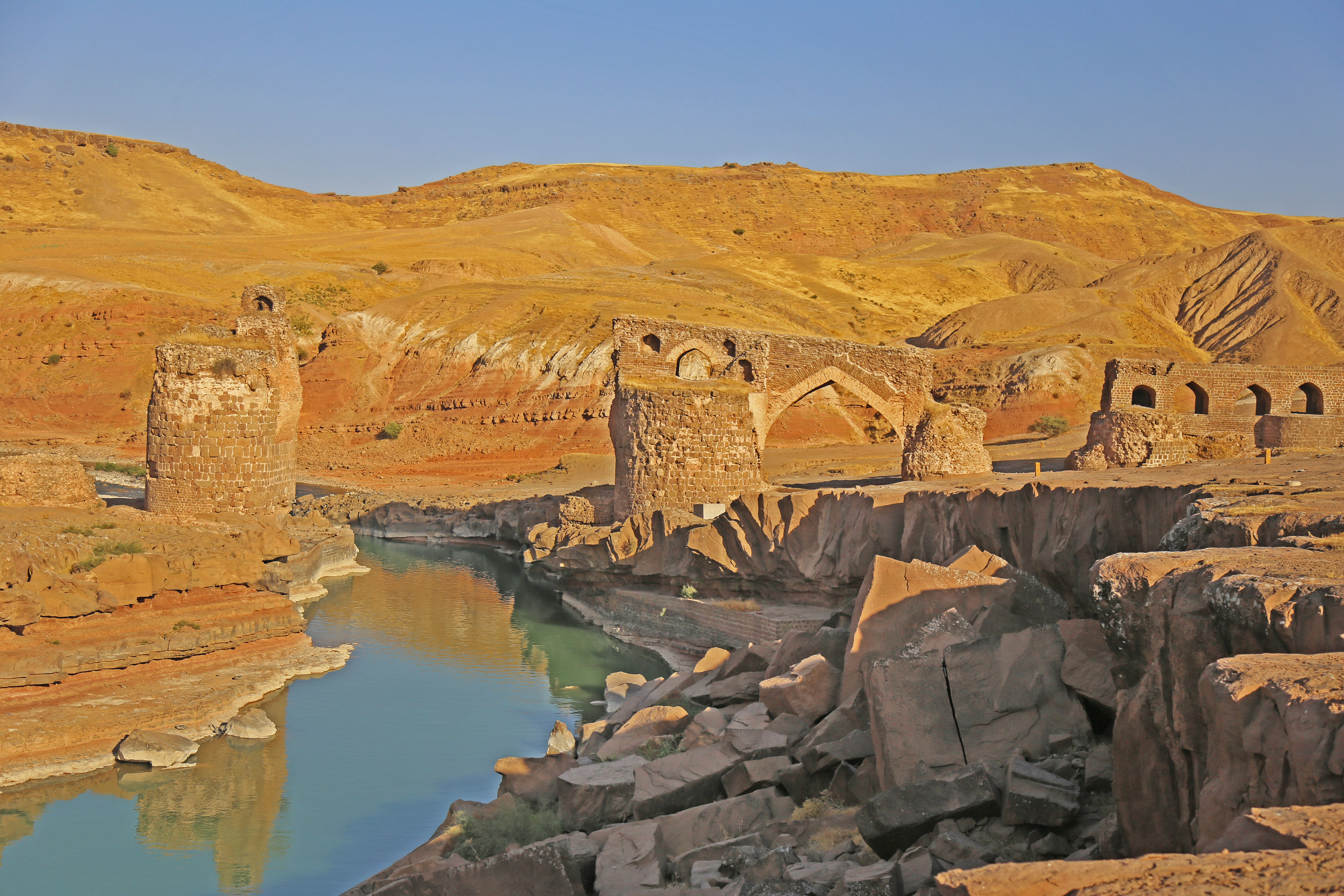
Gavmishan

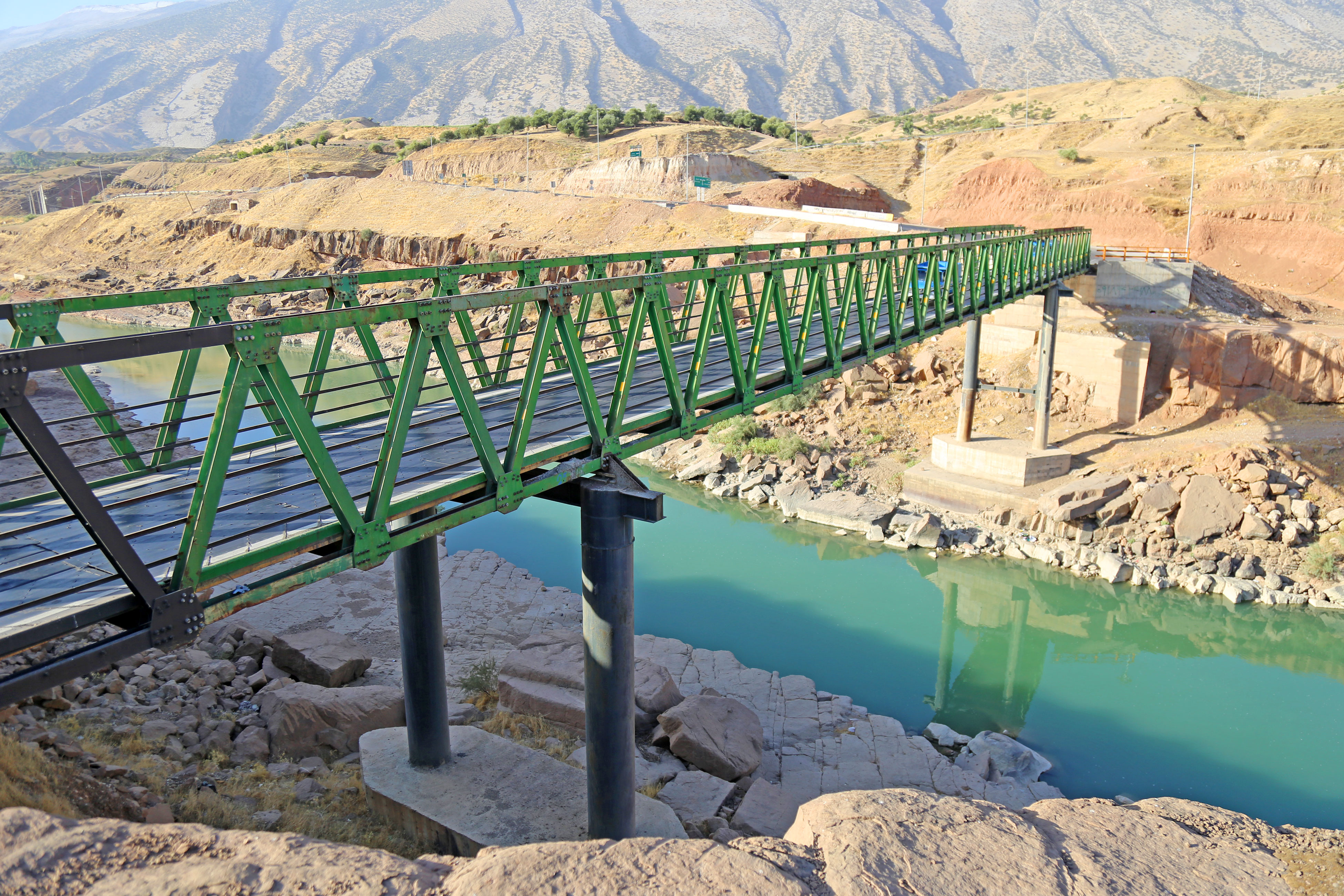
Gavmishan

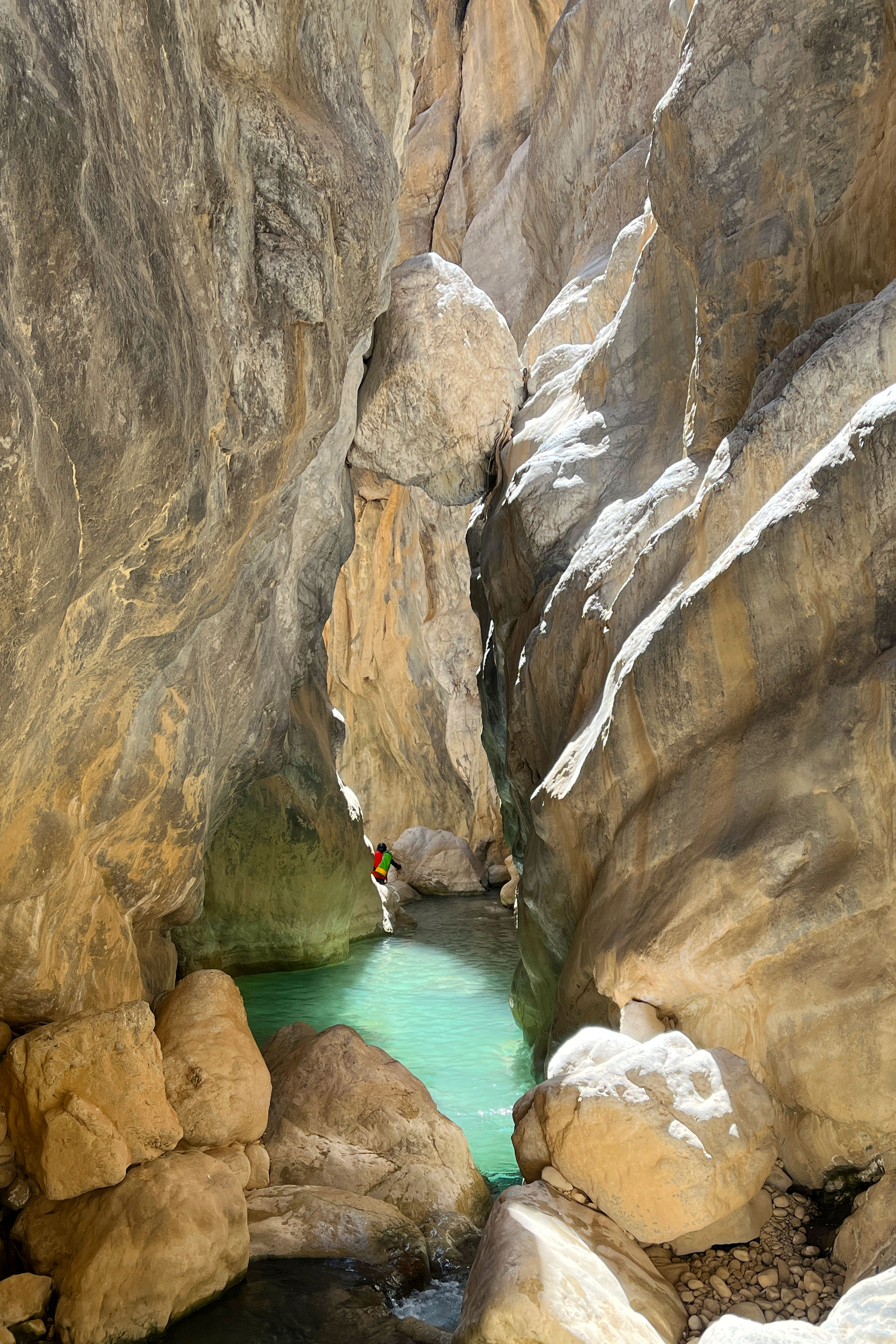
Vizhdarvan Valley

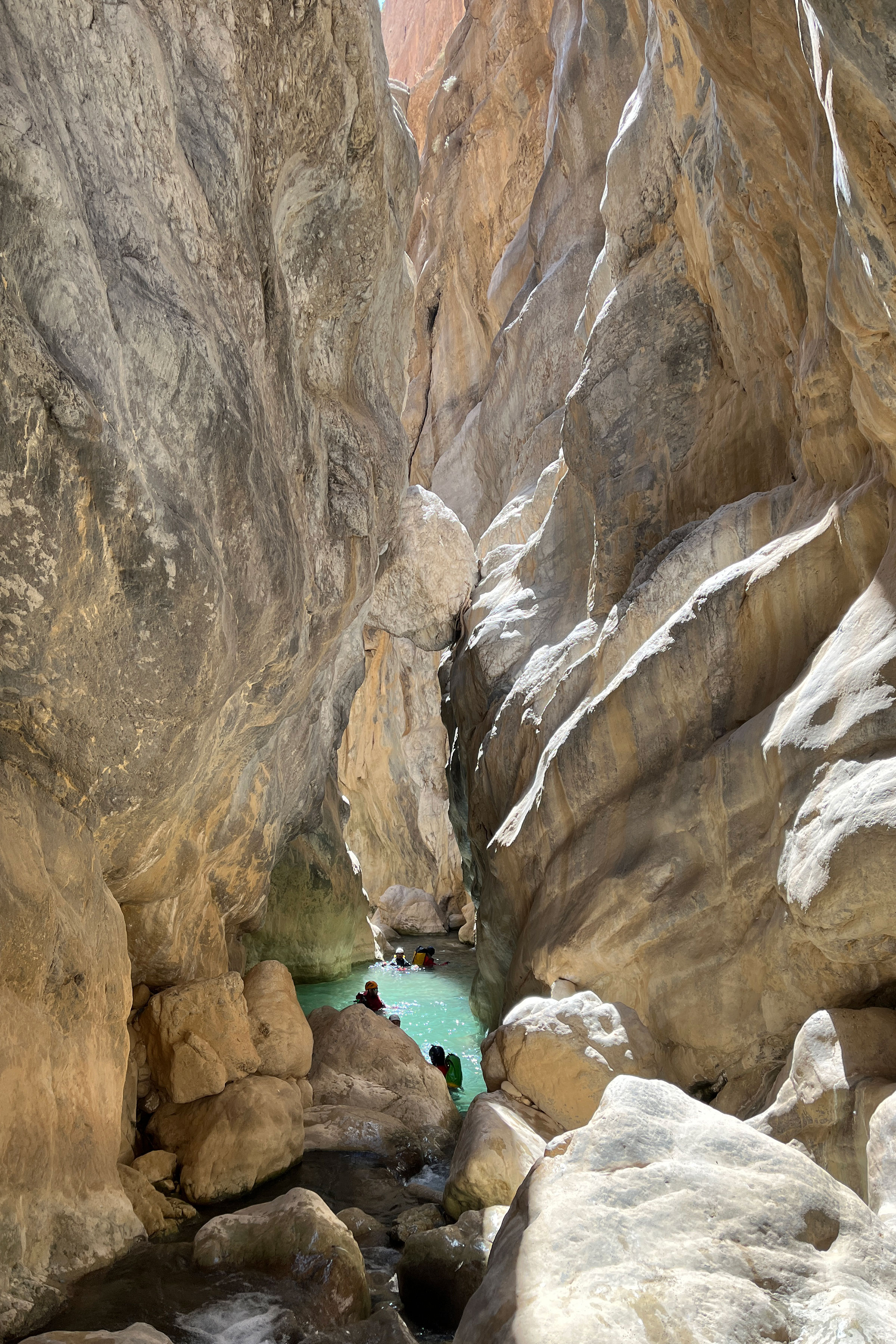
Vizhdarvan Valley

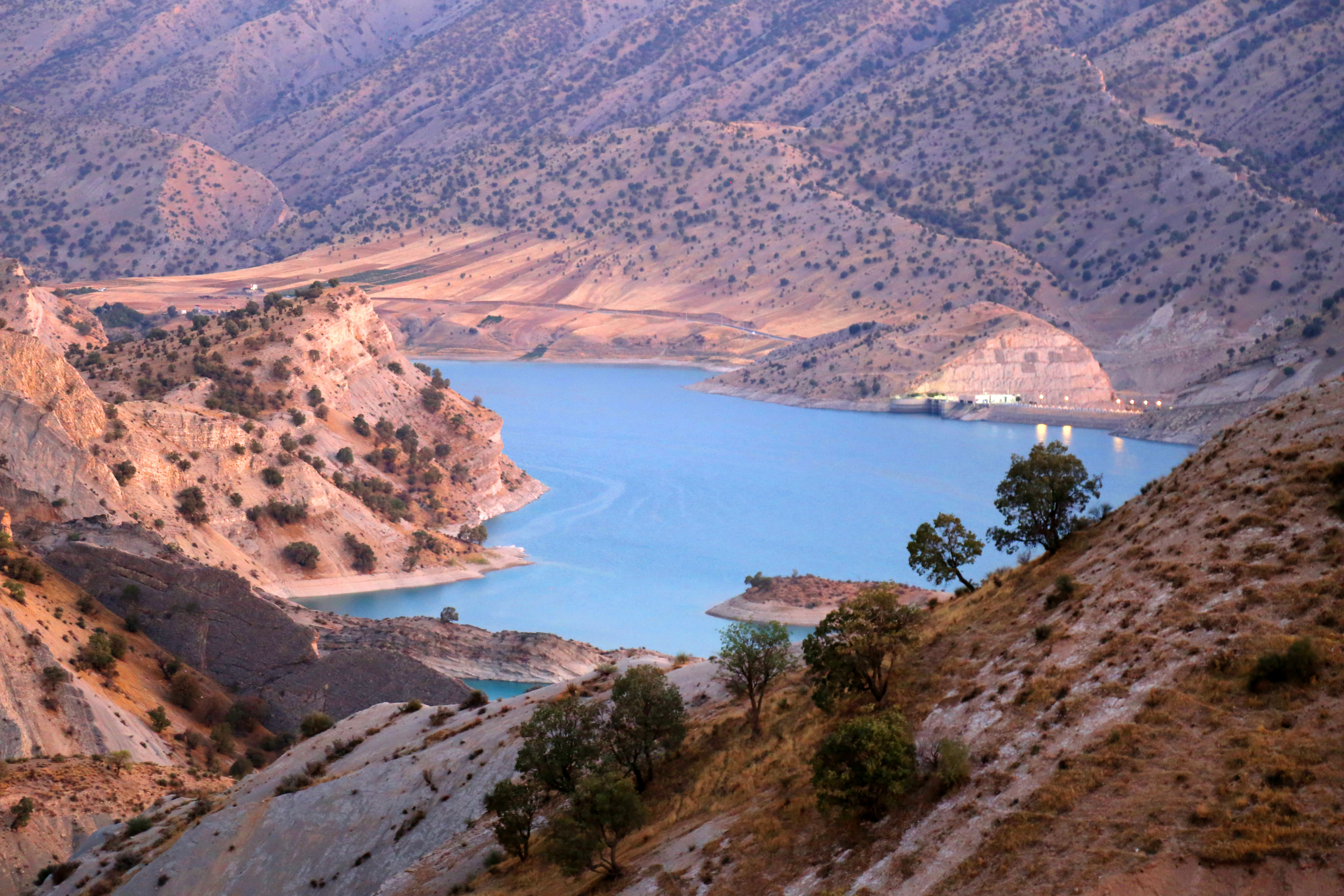
Malekshahi Dam

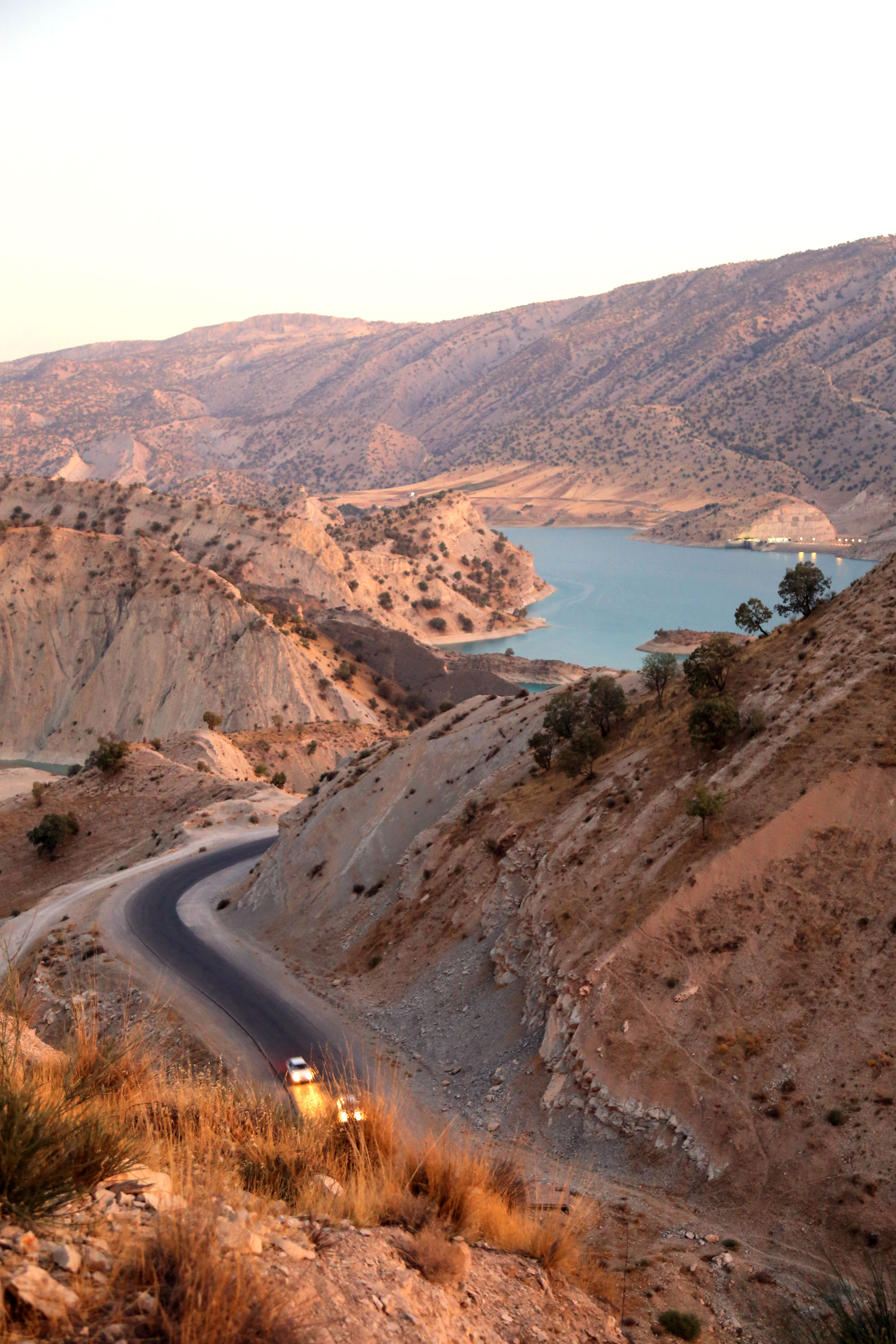
Malekshahi Dam

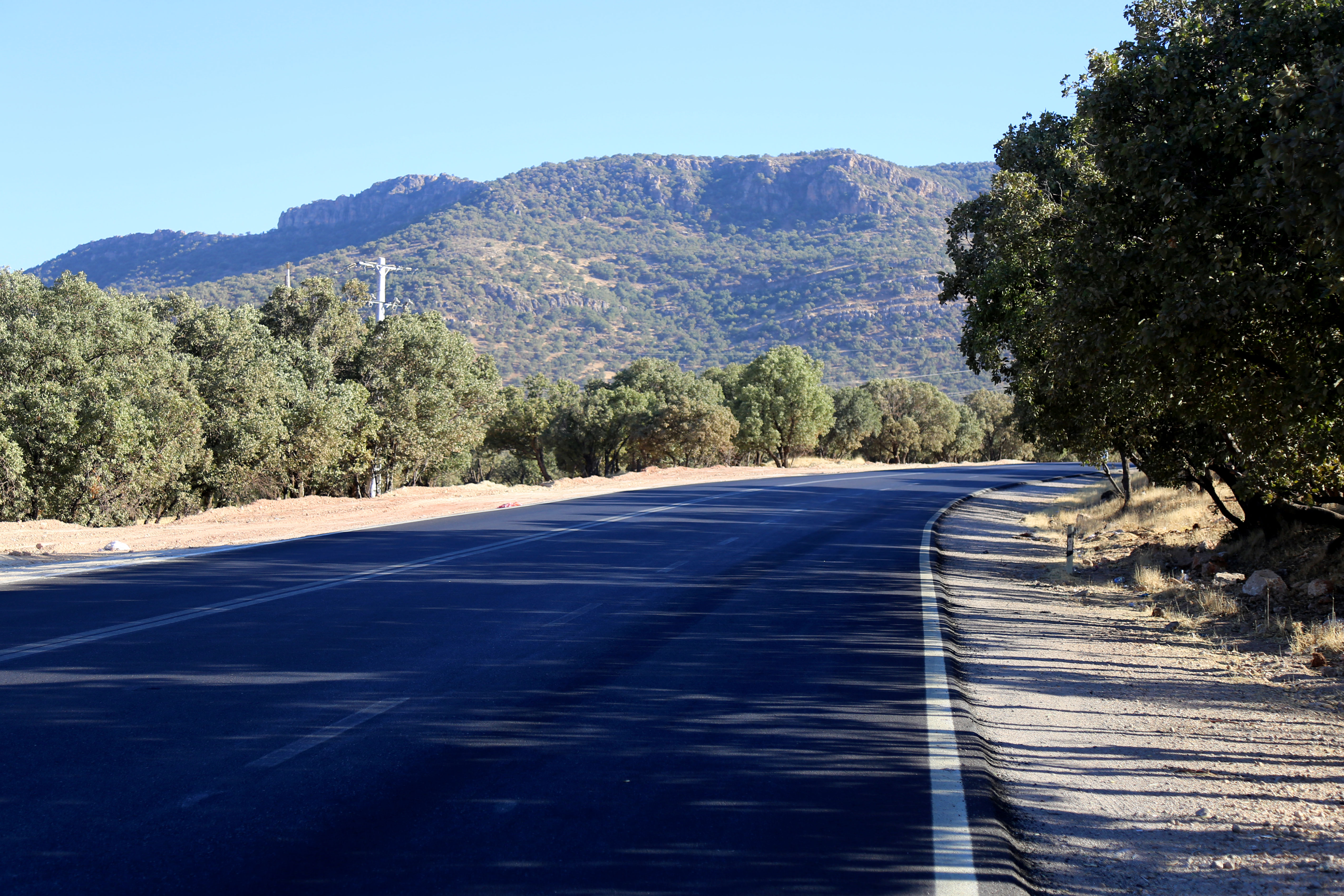
Ilam Province
