= Cheshmeh-ye Shirin =

Cheshmeh-ye Shirin or Cheshmeh Shirin or Chashmeh Shirin (Persian: چشمه شيرين) may refer to:

- Cheshmeh Shirin, Arsanjan, Fars Province
- Cheshmeh-ye Shirin, Kazerun, Fars Province
- Cheshmeh Shirin, Neyriz, Fars Province
- Cheshmeh Shirin, Ilam, Ilam Province
- Cheshmeh-ye Shirin Rashnow, Ilam Province
- Cheshmeh-ye Shirin Shah Ahmad, Ilam Province
- Cheshmeh Shirin, Bagh-e Malek, Khuzestan Province
- Cheshmeh Shirin, Dezful, Khuzestan Province
- Cheshmeh Shirin, Masjed Soleyman, Khuzestan Province
- Cheshmeh Shirin-e Vashian, Lorestan Province
