= Gol Gol =

Gol Gol or Gulgul or Kulkul may refer to:

- Gol Gol, Hamadan, Iran
- Gol Gol, Kermanshah, Iran
- Gol Gol, New South Wales, Australia
- Gol Gol Rural District, Iran
- Golgol River
- Bagh-e Gol Gol, Iran
- Sepideh-ye Gol Gol, Iran
- Gol Gol-e Olya (disambiguation)
- Gol Gol-e Sofla (disambiguation)
- Kulkul, a version of Portuguese filhós in Goa that are eaten during the Christmas season
- Kul-kul, a drumtower in Balinese Hindu temple architecture

== See also ==
- Kol Kol (disambiguation)
- Kalkal (disambiguation)
