= Shahrak-e Hezarani =

Village in Ilam province, Iran

Shahrak-e Hezarani Persian: شهرک هزارانی
- Village
- Location within Iran Location within Ilam Province
- Coordinates: 32°56′31″N 47°27′58″E
- Country: Iran
- Province: Ilam
- County: Abdanan
- District: Central
- Rural District: Jaberansar

Population (2016)
  - Total: 2,860
- Time zone: UTC+3:30 (IRST)

Shahrak-e Hezarani (Persian: شهرك هزاراني) (Note: Also romanized as Shahrak-e Hezārānī; also known as Hezārānī) is a village in Jaberansar Rural District of the Central District of Abdanan County, Ilam province, Iran. It was the capital of Chamkabud Rural District (Note: Renamed Vach Kabud Rural District) until its capital was transferred to the village of Chamkabud. Its capital was transferred again to the village of Vachakab when it was renamed Vach Kabud Rural District.

== Demographics ==
=== Language and ethnicity ===
The village is populated by Kurds and Lurs.

Shahrak-e Hezarani linguistic composition
| language | percent |
| Kurdish | 90% |
| Luri | 10% |

=== Population ===
At the time of the 2006 National Census, the village's population was 3,098 in 665 households, when it was in Chamkabud Rural District of Sarabbagh District. The following census in 2011 counted 3,145 people in 828 households. The 2016 census measured the population of the village as 2,860 people in 807 households, by which time it had been transferred to Jaberansar Rural District of the Central District. It was the most populous village in the rural district.
