= Tappeh Hammam =

Tappeh Hammam or Tappeh Hamam (Persian: تپه حمام) may refer to:

- Tappeh Hammam-e Olya
- Tappeh Hammam-e Sofla
- Tappeh Hammam-e Vosta
