= Vachakbud =

Vachakbud (Persian: وچكبود and Persian: وچ کبود may refer to:

- Vach Kabud Rural District, an administrative division of Abdanan County, Ilam province, Iran
- Vachakbud-e Olya, a village in Abdanan County, Ilam province, Iran
- Vachakbud-e Sofla, a village in Abdanan County, Ilam province, Iran
