= Siah Khani =

Siah Khani or Siahkhani (Persian: سياه خاني) may refer to:

- Siah Khani, Gilan
- Siah Khani, Ilam
- Siahkhani, Kermanshah
