= Divaneh, Iran =

Divaneh ديونه
- Village
- Location within Iran
- Coordinates: 32°59′13″N 47°12′40″E
- Country: Iran
- Province: Ilam
- County: Abdanan
- Bakhsh: Central
- Rural District: Jaber-e Ansar

Population (2006)
  - Total: 168
- Time zone: UTC+3:30 (IRST)
  - Summer (DST): UTC+4:30 (IRDT)

Divaneh (Persian: ديونه, also Romanized as Dīvaneh; also known as Deyoneh and Dīūneh) is a village in Jaber-e Ansar Rural District, in the Central District of Abdanan County, Ilam Province, Iran. At the 2006 census, its population was 168, in 36 families.
