= Chamkabud, Abdanan =

Village in Ilam province, Iran

Chamkabud Persian: چم‌کبود
- Village
- Location within Iran Location within Ilam Province
- Coordinates: 32°55′06″N 47°31′11″E
- Country: Iran
- Province: Ilam
- County: Abdanan
- District: Central
- Rural District: Jaberansar

Population (2016)
  - Total: 1,202
- Time zone: UTC+3:30 (IRST)

Chamkabud (Persian: چم‌کبود) (Note: Also romanized as Cham Kabud, Cham Kabūd and Cham-e Kabūd; also known as Cham Kabūd-e Pā'īn, Cham Kabūd-e-Pā’īn, and Chamkabood Bala) is a village in Jaberansar Rural District of the Central District of Abdanan County, Ilam province, Iran. It was the capital of Chamkabud Rural District until its capital was transferred to the village of Vachakab.

== Demographics ==
=== Ethnicity ===
The village is populated by Kurds.

=== Population ===
At the time of the 2006 National Census, the village's population was 1,054 in 213 households, when it was in Sarabbagh District. The following census in 2011 counted 1,290 people in 332 households. The 2016 census measured the population of the village as 1,202 people in 351 households, by which time the village had been transferred to Jaberansar Rural District of the Central District.
