= Sarab-e Noql =

Sarab-e Noql سرابنقل
- Village
- Location within Iran
- Coordinates: 32°50′41″N 47°43′22″E
- Country: Iran
- Province: Ilam
- County: Abdanan
- Bakhsh: Sarab Bagh
- Rural District: Sarab Bagh

Population (2006)
  - Total: 159
- Time zone: UTC+3:30 (IRST)
  - Summer (DST): UTC+4:30 (IRDT)

Sarab-e Noql (Persian: سرابنقل, also Romanized as Sarāb-e Noql) is a village in Sarab Bagh Rural District, Sarab Bagh District, Abdanan County, Ilam Province, Iran. At the 2006 census, its population was 159, in 30 families. The village is populated by Lurs.
