= Posht Qaleh, Ilam =

Posht Qaleh پشت قلعه
- Village
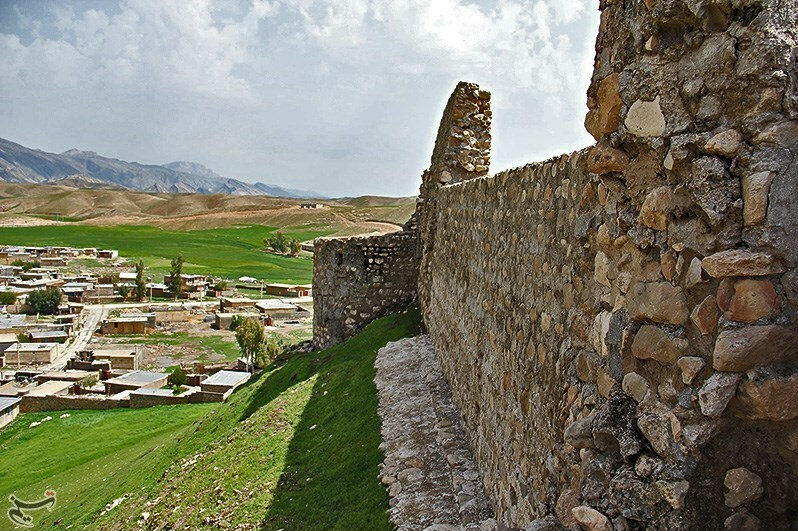
- Abdanan Castle (2015)

- Location within Iran
- Coordinates: 32°58′00″N 47°26′07″E
- Country: Iran
- Province: Ilam
- County: Abdanan
- Bakhsh: Central
- Rural District: Jaber-e Ansar

Population (2006)
  - Total: 1,231
- Time zone: UTC+3:30 (IRST)
  - Summer (DST): UTC+4:30 (IRDT)

Posht Qaleh (Persian: پشت قلعه, also Romanized as Posht Qal‘eh) is a village in Jaber-e Ansar Rural District, in the Central District of Abdanan County, Ilam Province, Iran. At the 2006 census, its population was 1,231, in 255 families.

== Demographics ==
Linguistic composition of the city.

Posht Qaleh linguistic composition
language	percent
Kurdish	55%
Luri	45%
