= Talur, Ilam =

Telur طلور
- Village
- Location within Iran
- Coordinates: 32°58′03″N 47°30′05″E
- Country: Iran
- Province: Ilam
- County: Abdanan
- Bakhsh: Sarab Bagh
- Rural District: Cham Kabud

Population (2006)
  - Total: 72
- Time zone: UTC+3:30 (IRST)
  - Summer (DST): UTC+4:30 (IRDT)

Telur (Persian: طلور, also Romanized as Ţelūr and Telūr) is a village in Cham Kabud Rural District, Sarab Bagh District, Abdanan County, Ilam Province, Iran. At the 2006 census, its population was 72, in 11 families. The village is populated by Kurds.
