= Gol Gol-e Sofla, Abdanan =

Gol Gol-e Sofla گل گل سفلي
- Village
- Location within Iran
- Coordinates: 32°51′00″N 47°39′00″E
- Country: Iran
- Province: Ilam
- County: Abdanan
- Bakhsh: Sarab Bagh
- Rural District: Sarab Bagh

Population (2006)
  - Total: 165
- Time zone: UTC+3:30 (IRST)
  - Summer (DST): UTC+4:30 (IRDT)

Gol Gol-e Sofla (Persian: گل گل سفلي, also Romanized as Gol Gol-e Soflá) is a village in Sarab Bagh Rural District, Sarab Bagh District, Abdanan County, Ilam Province, Iran. At the 2006 census, its population was 165, in 27 families. The village is populated by Kurds.
