= Vachakbud-e Sofla =

Vachakbud-e Sofla وچكبودسفلي
- Village
- Location within Iran
- Coordinates: 32°55′25″N 47°33′18″E
- Country: Iran
- Province: Ilam
- County: Abdanan
- Bakhsh: Sarab Bagh
- Rural District: Cham Kabud

Population (2006)
  - Total: 183
- Time zone: UTC+3:30 (IRST)
  - Summer (DST): UTC+4:30 (IRDT)

Vachakbud-e Sofla (Persian: وچكبودسفلي, also Romanized as Vachakbūd-e Soflá; also known as Vajah Kabūd-e Pā‘īn) is a village in Cham Kabud Rural District, Sarab Bagh District, Abdanan County, Ilam Province, Iran. At the 2006 census, its population was 183, in 31 families. The village is populated by both Kurds and Lurs.
