= Vachakbud-e Olya =

Vachakbud-e Olya وچكبودعليا
- Village
- Location within Iran
- Coordinates: 32°55′31″N 47°33′32″E
- Country: Iran
- Province: Ilam
- County: Abdanan
- Bakhsh: Sarab Bagh
- Rural District: Cham Kabud

Population (2006)
  - Total: 251
- Time zone: UTC+3:30 (IRST)
  - Summer (DST): UTC+4:30 (IRDT)

Vachakbud-e Olya (Persian: وچكبودعليا, also Romanized as Vachakbūd-e ‘Olyā; also known as Vajah Kabūd-e Bālā) is a village in Cham Kabud Rural District, Sarab Bagh District, Abdanan County, Ilam Province, Iran. At the 2006 census, its population was 251, in 44 families. The village is populated by both Kurds and Lurs.
