= Qadah-e Bala =

Qadah-e Bala قدح بالا
- Village
- Location within Iran
- Coordinates: 32°59′00″N 47°13′00″E
- Country: Iran
- Province: Ilam
- County: Abdanan
- Bakhsh: Central
- Rural District: Maspi

Population (2006)
  - Total: 118
- Time zone: UTC+3:30 (IRST)
  - Summer (DST): UTC+4:30 (IRDT)

Qadah-e Bala (Persian: قدح بالا, also Romanized as Qadaḩ-e Bālā) is a village in Maspi Rural District, in the Central District of Abdanan County, Ilam Province, Iran. At the 2006 census, its population was 118, in 24 families.
