= Gandab, Ilam =

Village in Ilam province, Iran

Gandab Persian: گنداب
- Village
- Location within Iran Location within Ilam Province
- Coordinates: 33°03′03″N 47°15′49″E
- Country: Iran
- Province: Ilam
- County: Abdanan
- District: Central
- Rural District: Masbi

Population (2016)
  - Total: 1,116
- Time zone: UTC+3:30 (IRST)

Gandab (Persian: گنداب) (Note: Also romanized as Gandāb) is a village in Masbi Rural District of the Central District of Abdanan County, Ilam province, Iran.

== Demographics ==
=== Ethnicity ===
The village is populated by Kurds.

=== Population ===
At the time of the 2006 National Census, the village's population was 923 in 192 households. The following census in 2011 counted 1,027 people in 229 households. The 2016 census measured the population of the village as 1,116 people in 297 households. It was the most populous village in its rural district.
