= Sarpoleh =

Village in Ilam province, Iran

Sarpoleh Persian: سرپله
- Village
- Location within Iran Location within Ilam Province
- Coordinates: 32°53′16″N 47°32′24″E
- Country: Iran
- Province: Ilam
- County: Abdanan
- District: Sarabbagh
- Rural District: Sarabbagh

Population (2016)
  - Total: 853
- Time zone: UTC+3:30 (IRST)

Sarpoleh (Persian: سرپله) (Note: Also romanized as Sar Paleh and Sar Poleh) is a village in Sarabbagh Rural District of Sarabbagh District, Abdanan County, Ilam province, Iran.

== Demographics ==
=== Ethnicity ===
The village is populated by Lurs.

=== Population ===
At the time of the 2006 National Census, the village's population was 841 in 177 households. The following census in 2011 counted 830 people in 208 households. The 2016 census measured the population of the village as 853 people in 258 households. It was the most populous village in its rural district.
