= Aradan, Ilam =

Aradan ارادان
- Village
- Location within Ilam Province Location within Iran
- Country: Iran
- Province: Ilam
- County: Abdanan
- Bakhsh: Central
- Rural District: Maspi

Population (2006)
  - Total: 44
- Time zone: UTC+3:30 (IRST)
  - Summer (DST): UTC+4:30 (IRDT)

Aradan (Persian: ارادان, also Romanized as Ārādān) is a village in Maspi Rural District, in the Central District of Abdanan County, Ilam Province, Iran. At the 2006 census, its population was 44, in 10 families.
