= Siah Khuni =

Siah Khuni (Persian: سياه خوني) may refer to:

- Siah Khuni, Siahkal
- Siah Khuni, Talesh
