= Vachakab =

Village in Ilam province, Iran

Vachakab Persian: وچکاب
- Village
- Location within Iran Location within Ilam Province
- Coordinates: 32°55′42″N 47°34′23″E
- Country: Iran
- Province: Ilam
- County: Abdanan
- District: Sarabbagh
- Rural District: Vach Kabud

Population (2016)
  - Total: 621
- Time zone: UTC+3:30 (IRST)

Vachakab (Persian: وچكاب) (Note: Also romanized as Vachak Ab and Vachak Āb) is a village in, and the capital of, Vach Kabud Rural District (Note: Formerly Chamkabud Rural District) of Sarab Bagh District, Abdanan County, Ilam province, Iran. The previous capital of the rural district was the village of Chamkabud. Prior to that time, its capital was the village of Shahrak-e Hezarani.

== Demographics ==
=== Language and ethnicity ===
The village is populated by both Kurds and Lurs. Smoking is forbidden in the village.

=== Population ===
At the time of the 2006 National Census, the village's population was 552 in 103 households. The following census in 2011 counted 614 people in 133 households. The 2016 census measured the population of the village as 621 people in 174 households. It was the most populous village in its rural district.
