= Haft Cheshmeh, Abdanan =

Village in Ilam province, Iran

Haft Cheshmeh Persian: هفت چشمه
- Village
- Location within Iran Location within Ilam Province
- Coordinates: 32°58′02″N 47°26′59″E
- Country: Iran
- Province: Ilam
- County: Abdanan
- District: Central
- Rural District: Jaberansar

Population (2016)
  - Total: 1,608
- Time zone: UTC+3:30 (IRST)

Haft Cheshmeh (Persian: هفت چشمه) is a village in, and the capital of, Jaberansar Rural District of the Central District of Abdanan County, Ilam province, Iran.

== Demographics ==
=== Ethnicity ===
The village is populated by Lurs.

=== Population ===
At the time of the 2006 National Census, the village's population was 1,738 in 337 households. The following census in 2011 counted 1,697 people in 408 households. The 2016 census measured the population of the village as 1,608 people in 454 households.
