= Qadah-e Pain =

Qadah-e Pain قدح پائين
- Village
- Interactive map of Qadah-e Pain
- Coordinates: 32°57′18.8″N 47°12′52.3″E
- Country: Iran
- Province: Ilam
- County: Abdanan
- Bakhsh: Central
- Rural District: Maspi

Population (2006)
  - Total: 23
- Time zone: UTC+3:30 (IRST)
  - Summer (DST): UTC+4:30 (IRDT)

Qadah-e Pain (Persian: قدح پائين, also Romanized as Qadaḩ-e Pā’īn) is a village in Maspi Rural District, in the Central District of Abdanan County, Ilam Province, Iran. At the 2006 census, its population was 23, in 5 families.
