= Qadah =

Qadah (Persian: قدح) may refer to:

- Qadah-e Bala
- Qadah-e Pain
