= Zhivar, Ilam =

Zhivar ژيور
- Village
- Location within Iran
- Coordinates: 32°52′28″N 47°37′07″E
- Country: Iran
- Province: Ilam
- County: Abdanan
- Bakhsh: Sarab Bagh
- Rural District: Sarab Bagh

Population (2006)
  - Total: 717
- Time zone: UTC+3:30 (IRST)
  - Summer (DST): UTC+4:30 (IRDT)

Zhivar (Persian: ژيور, also Romanized as Zhīvar; also known as Jīvar) is a village in Sarab Bagh Rural District, Sarab Bagh District, Abdanan County, Ilam Province, Iran. According to 2006 census, its population was 717, in 132 families. The village is populated by Kurds.
