= Siah Khani, Ilam =

Siah Khani سياه خاني
- Village
- Location within Iran
- Coordinates: 33°01′12″N 47°16′29″E
- Country: Iran
- Province: Ilam
- County: Abdanan
- Bakhsh: Central
- Rural District: Maspi

Population (2006)
  - Total: 121
- Time zone: UTC+3:30 (IRST)
  - Summer (DST): UTC+4:30 (IRDT)

Siah Khani (Persian: سياه خاني, also Romanized as Sīāh Khānī and Sīāhkhānī and Sīāh Khānī) is a village in Maspi Rural District, in the Central District of Abdanan County, Ilam Province, Iran. At the 2006 census, its population was 121, in 27 families. The village is populated by Kurds.
