= Gol Gol-e Olya, Abdanan =

Gol Gol-e Olya گل گل عليا
- Village
- Location within Iran
- Coordinates: 32°54′05″N 47°37′39″E
- Country: Iran
- Province: Ilam
- County: Abdanan
- Bakhsh: Sarab Bagh
- Rural District: Sarab Bagh

Population (2006)
  - Total: 340
- Time zone: UTC+3:30 (IRST)
  - Summer (DST): UTC+4:30 (IRDT)

Gol Gol-e Olya (Persian: گل گل عليا, also Romanized as Gol Gol-e ‘Olyā; also known as Gol Gol-e Bālā) is a village in Sarab Bagh Rural District, Sarab Bagh District, Abdanan County, Ilam Province, Iran. At the 2006 census, its population was 340, in 62 families. The village is populated by Kurds.
