= Anjireh Vatisheh Kand =

Village in Ilam province, Iran

Anjireh Vatisheh Kand Persian: انجيره وتيشه كند
- Village
- Location within Iran Location within Ilam Province
- Coordinates: 33°04′48″N 47°11′25″E
- Country: Iran
- Province: Ilam
- County: Abdanan
- District: Central
- Rural District: Masbi

Population (2016)
  - Total: 901
- Time zone: UTC+3:30 (IRST)

Anjireh Vatisheh Kand (Persian: انجيره وتيشه كند) (Note: Also romanized as Ānjīreh Vatīsheh Kand; also known as Anjīreh) is a village in, and the capital of, Masbi Rural District of the Central District of Abdanan County, Ilam province, Iran.

== Demographics ==
=== Ethnicity ===
The village is populated by Kurds.

=== Population ===
At the time of the 2006 National Census, the village's population was 1,142 in 191 households. The following census in 2011 counted 1,091 people in 232 households. The 2016 census measured the population of the village as 901 people in 225 households.
