= Talur =

Talur (Persian: تلور or طلور) may refer to:

- Talur, Golestan (تلور)
- Talur, Ilam (طلور)
- Talur language
