= Tappeh Hammam-e Olya =

Tappeh Hammam-e Olya تپه‌حمام علیا
- Village
- Location within Iran
- Coordinates: 32°40′18″N 47°45′45″E
- Country: Iran
- Province: Ilam
- County: Abdanan
- Bakhsh: Kalat
- Rural District: Murmuri

Population (2006)
  - Total: 190
- Time zone: UTC+3:30 (IRST)
  - Summer (DST): UTC+4:30 (IRDT)

Tappeh Hammam-e Olya (Persian: تپه‌حمام علیا, also Romanized as Tappeh Ḩammām-e ‘Olyā; also known as Tappeh Ḩammām-e Bālā) is a village in Murmuri Rural District, Kalat District, Abdanan County, Ilam Province, Iran. At the 2006 census, its population was 190, in 35 families. The village is populated by Lurs.
