= Aradan =

Aradan may refer to:

- Aradan, Ilam, a village in Ilam Province, Iran
- Aradan District, an administrative subdivision of Semnan Province, Iran
- Aradan, Iran, capital of Aradan County, Semnan Province, Iran
- Aradan County, a county in Semnan Province in Iran
- Aradan, Russia, a rural settlement (posyolok) in Krasnoyarsk Krai, Russia
- Aradan (river), a river in Krasnoyarsk Krai, Russia
- Characters in Lord of the Rings, see Hador#The House of Hador
