= Mulab =

Mulab (Persian: مولاب) may refer to:

- Mulab-e Olya

== See also ==
- MuLab, a digital audio workstation
