= Largheh =

Village in Ilam province, Iran

Largheh Persian: لرغه
- Village
- Location within Iran Location within Ilam Province
- Coordinates: 32°45′18″N 47°43′20″E
- Country: Iran
- Province: Ilam
- County: Abdanan
- District: Kalat
- Rural District: Murmuri

Population (2016)
  - Total: 166
- Time zone: UTC+3:30 (IRST)

Largheh (Persian: لرغه) is a village in Murmuri Rural District of Kalat District, Abdanan County, Ilam province, Iran.

== Demographics ==
=== Ethnicity ===
The village is populated by Lurs.

=== Population ===
At the time of the 2006 National Census, the village's population was 181 in 39 households. The following census in 2011 counted 183 people in 42 households. The 2016 census measured the population of the village as 166 people in 45 households; it was the most populous village in its rural district.
