= Cheshmeh-ye Shirin Rashnow =

Cheshmeh-ye Shirin Rashnow چشمه شيرين رشنو
- Village
- Location within Iran
- Coordinates: 32°30′00″N 47°38′00″E
- Country: Iran
- Province: Ilam
- County: Abdanan
- Bakhsh: Kalat
- Rural District: Murmuri

Population (2006)
  - Total: 120
- Time zone: UTC+3:30 (IRST)
  - Summer (DST): UTC+4:30 (IRDT)

Cheshmeh-ye Shirin Rashnow (Persian: چشمه شيرين رشنو, also Romanized as Cheshmeh-ye Shīrīn Rashnow; also known as Cheshmeh Shīrīn) is a village in Murmuri Rural District, Kalat District, Abdanan County, Ilam Province, Iran. At the 2006 census, its population was 120, in 18 families. The village is populated by Kurds.
