= Panj Berar Murmuri Castle =

Castle in Ilam Province, Iran

Panj Barar Murmuri castle
- قلعه پنج برار مور موری

General information
- Type: Castle
- Location: Abdanan County, Iran

Panj Barar Murmuri castle (Persian: قلعه پنج برار مور موری) is a historical castle located in Abdanan County in Ilam Province.
