= Hezar Darb Castle =

Castle in Ilam Province, Iran

Hezar Darb castle
- قلعه هزار درب
- Interactive map of the Hezar Darb castle area

General information
- Type: Castle
- Location: Abdanan County, Iran
- Coordinates: 32°59′06″N 47°25′52″E

Hezar Darb castle (Persian: قلعه هزار درب) is a historical castle located in Abdanan County in Ilam Province, The longevity of this fortress dates back to the Sasanian Empire.
