= Hezarani Castle =

Castle in Ilam Province, Iran

- قلعه هزارانی

General information
- Type: Castle
- Location: Abdanan County, Iran

Hezarani Castle (Persian: قلعه هزارانی) is a historical castle located in Abdanan County in Ilam Province, The longevity of this fortress dates back to the Sasanian Empire.
