= Tappeh Hammam-e Sofla =

Tempeh Hammam-e Sofla تپه‌حمام سفلی
- Village
- Location within Iran
- Coordinates: 32°38′59″N 47°48′21″E
- Country: Iran
- Province: Ilam
- County: Abdanan
- Bakhsh: Kalat
- Rural District: Murmuri

Population (2006)
  - Total: 61
- Time zone: UTC+3:30 (IRST)
  - Summer (DST): UTC+4:30 (IRDT)

Tappeh Hammam-e Sofla (Persian: تپه‌حمام سفلی, also Romanized as Tappeh Ḩammām-e Soflá; also known as Tappeh Ḩammām-e Pā’īn) is a village in Murmuri Rural District, Kalat District, Abdanan County, Ilam Province, Iran. At the 2006 census, its population was 61, in 10 families. The village is populated by Lurs.
