= Zhivar =

Zhivar (Persian: ژيوار or ژيور) may refer to:

- Zhivar, Ilam (ژيور - Zhīvar)
- Zhivar, Kurdistan (ژيوار - Zhīvār)
