= Tappeh Hammam-e Vosta =

Tappeh Hammam-e Vosta تپه حمام وسطي
- Village
- Location within Iran
- Coordinates: 32°39′31″N 47°47′43″E
- Country: Iran
- Province: Ilam
- County: Abdanan
- Bakhsh: Kalat
- Rural District: Murmuri

Population (2006)
  - Total: 71
- Time zone: UTC+3:30 (IRST)
  - Summer (DST): UTC+4:30 (IRDT)

Tappeh Hammam-e Vosta (Persian: تپه حمام وسطي, also Romanized as Tappeh Ḩammām-e Vosţá; also known as Tappeh Ḩamām and Tappeh Ḩammām-e Vasaţ) is a village in Murmuri Rural District, Kalat District, Abdanan County, Ilam Province, Iran. At the 2006 census, its population was 71, in 14 families. The village is populated by Lurs.
