= Eye injuries during 2022 Iranian protests =

Conservative estimates reported by ophthalmologists in November 2022 stated there had been 580 confirmed cases of significant eye injuries during the 2022 Woman, Life, Freedom protests triggered by the death-in-custody of Mahsa "Jina" Amini. The actual number of injuries is likely much higher. The widespread nature of the eye injuries across the country and the number of cases reported demonstrates a systematic nature to these attacks.

== Use of kinetic-impact-projectiles ==
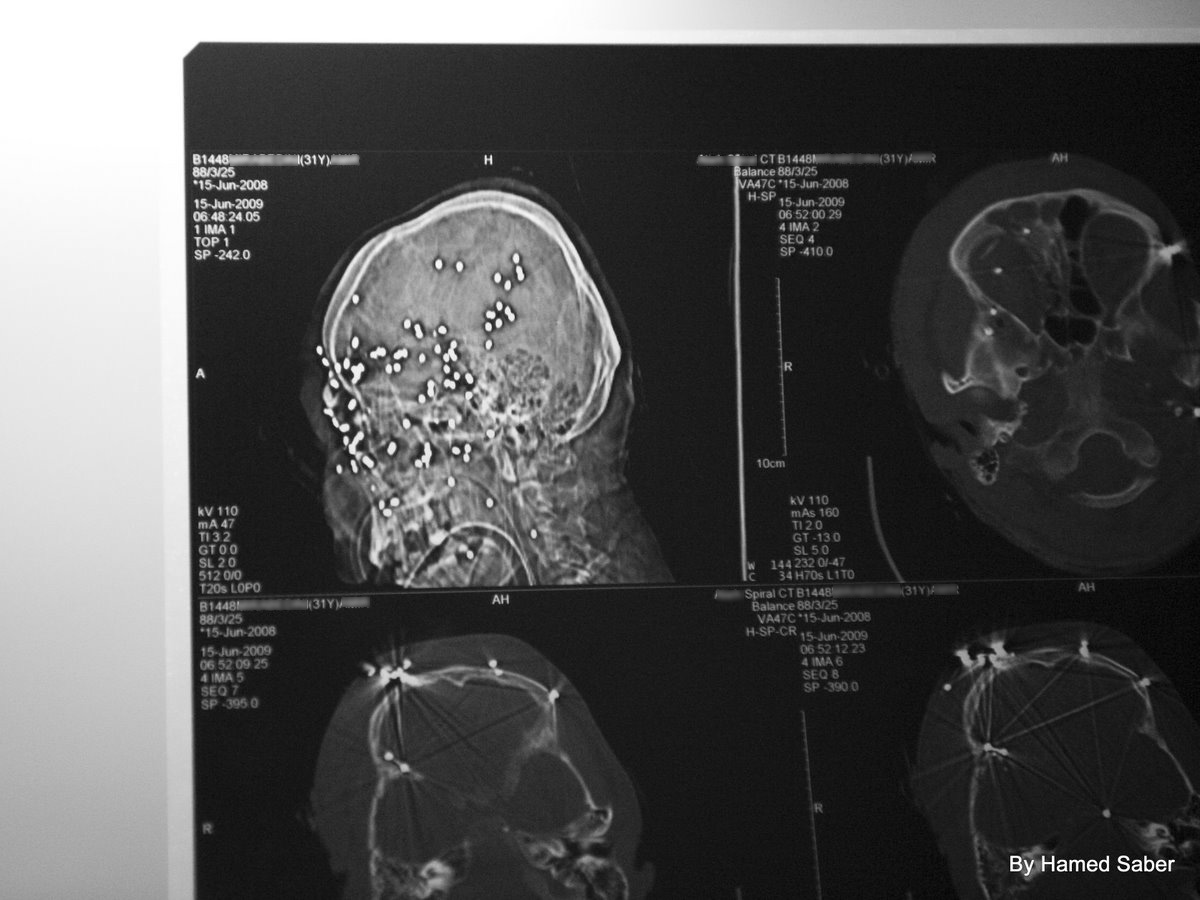
X-ray of an Iranian protestor who suffered eye damage after being shot in the face with a non-lethal stinger round in 2009

Kinetic-impact-projectiles (KIPs) also known as baton rounds, or rubber/plastic bullets are non-lethal projectiles used for crowd control purposes by riot police. KIPs are marketed as non or less-lethal weapons used for the purposes of dispersing crowds without causing penetrating wounds. However, when used inappropriately and fired indiscriminately, they have been known to cause injuries leading to life-long disability, or even death. Examples of KIPs include rubber or plastic bullets, bean bag rounds, sponge rounds (rounds with a softer nose/tip to limit impact) or pellet rounds of birdshot or buckshot. Abolfazl Adinezadeh, a 17 year old boy that had joined the Woman, Life, Freedom protests is one of many examples of protesters in Iran who have been killed as a result of close range discharge of KIPs. Cases have also been reported in which protesters have either been killed, or lost an eye as a result of being hit directly by tear gas canisters. Abolfazl Amirataie, a 16 year old boy who had joined protests on 22 September 2022 was shot directly in the head at close range with a tear gas canister, causing catastrophic damage to one side of his skull and brain. After 8 months in a vegetative state, Amirataie succumbed to his injuries on 27 May 2023.

Amnesty International conducted a review of the abuse of KIPs and found examples across 30 different countries of undue injury suffered by protesters at the hands of riot police. Eye injuries in the Chilean protests were so widespread that at the time it was estimated by the Chilean Ophthalmology Society that it was the highest number of cases registered globally.

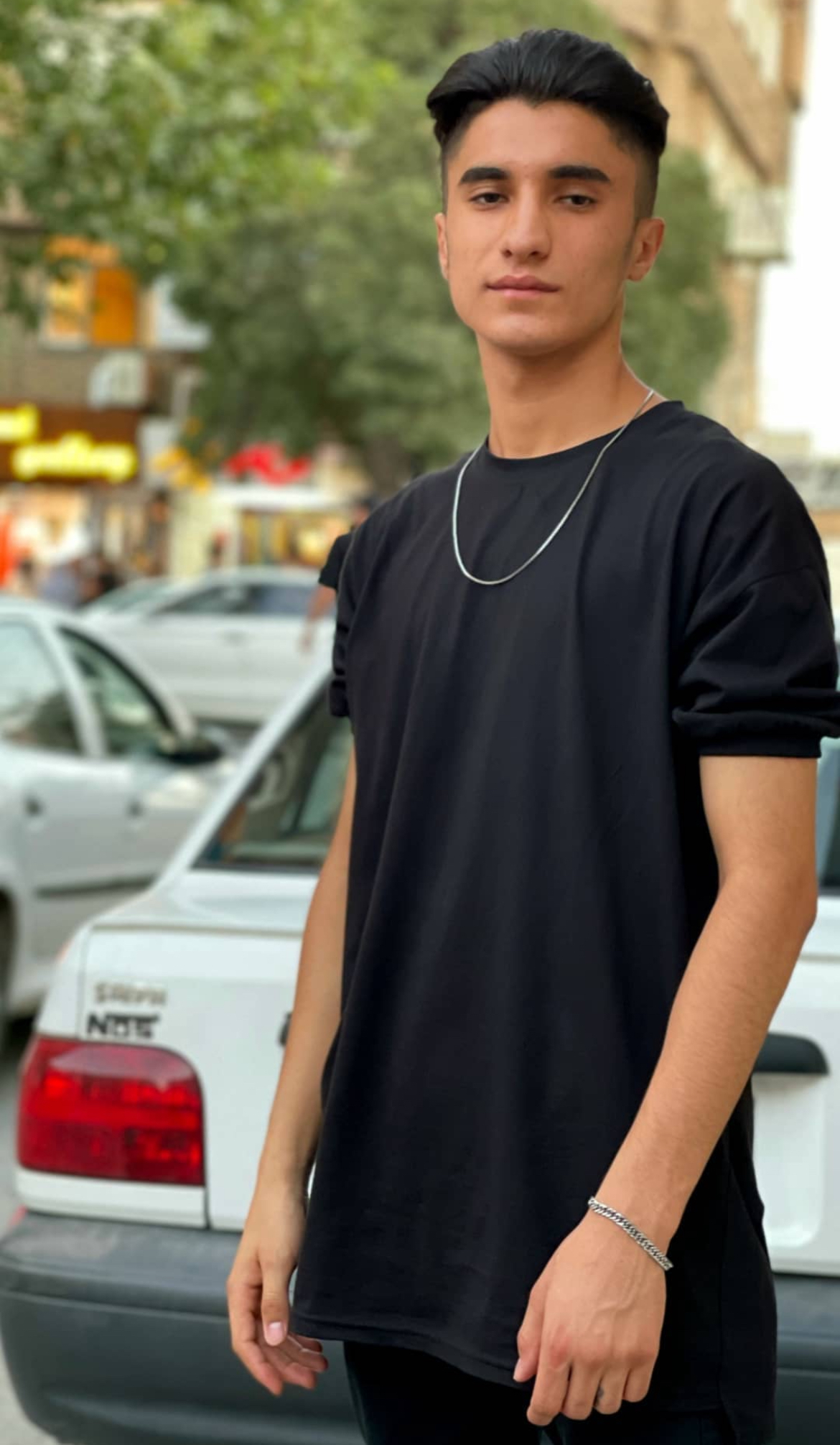
Matin Hassani

The AAO has called for the end of the use of KIPs against protesters, as have the Physicians for Human Rights as well as Amnesty International.

=== Historical use of KPIs against protesters in Iran ===
The 2022 protests were not the first time eye injuries were reported inside of Iran. Other protesters, such as, Koroush Kiya (21 years old at the time) had attended the 2017-2018 Iranian Protests in Karaj where he was shot directly in the face, resulting in his right eye causing irreparable damage in August 2018 with a paintball gun while attending. The next year, Matin Hassani was shot at with a pellet gun when attending a protest in Bukan in November of 2019. He sustained permanent damage to his left eye. Later, doctors from Isfahan in the aftermath of protests in November 2021 reported 40 admissions of eye injuries in one day of police crackdown against peaceful protesters. The true number of eye injuries across protests is unknown.

== Crime against humanity ==
Article 7 of the Rome Statute under which the International Criminal Court is established defines crimes against humanity. The definition includes:

"Other inhumane acts of a similar character intentionally causing great suffering, or serious injury to body or to mental or physical health." - Article 7 the Rome Statute, Part 2 (1)(k). "Attack directed against any civilian population" means a course of conduct involving the multiple commission of acts referred to in paragraph 1 against any civilian population, pursuant to or in furtherance of a State or organizational policy to commit such attack;" - Article 7 the Rome Statute, Part 2 (1)(a).

Norway based non-government organisation Iran Human Rights (IHRNGO) confirmed 138 specific cases of eye injuries across different cities in Iran to highlight the systematic nature of the injuries against unarmed protesters. First hand accounts of lasers on the faces of protesters prior to being shot further emphasise the purposeful intent of injury to the eyes. While those injured in Chile and the United States have had some (albeit limited and scattered) success in taking their cases to court, those in Iran have been unable to build cases without threat and retaliation. Families of murdered protesters who have made attempts to seek justice via the court system inside of Iran have been repeatedly threatened or detained in retaliation for their efforts. In July of 2023, sister of murdered protester Milad Saeedianjoo, Zahra Saeedianjoo was apprehended and detained for a second time in four months. Earlier in the year Zahra has also been fired from her job in relation to her activities seeking justice for her brother. It is therefore virtually impossible to pursue justice internally in Iran.

"Injured protesters, in particular those who have lost their vision due to their serious eye injuries, explained that they feared their injuries visibly marked them as dissidents and could be used as proof of their participation in the protests. A protester who was blinded in one eye stated that his lodging an official compliant would be tantamount to signing an order for his own conviction. In many cases, injured protesters who spoke up about their injuries or demanded justice, including through social media posting, were harassed by the authorities, including by being summoned, and arrested.. In some cases, victims who spoke up about their injuries were prosecuted on charges such as "propaganda against the system" and convicted. A protester who was blinded and published their story on social media were arrested and requested to re-repost stating that, in reality, they were injured by members of terrorist organizations." Detailed findings, UN Independent Fact Finding Mission on Iran (A/HRC/55/CRP.1), page 170, paragraph 163.

The Islamic Republic judicial system applies Qisas, or retaliation/retribution law. Mehdi Mousavian arrested 31 December 2017 in relation to protests was accused and convicted of throwing stones which blinded a policeman in one eye. The Judiciary sentenced Mousavian to Qisas, meaning his sentence would include the removal of his eye if he did not pay a fine of 14 billion toman (~$280,000 USD). Mousavian's release from prison was announced on 31 May 2024. If this sentence had been executed, it would have set a precedent for the pursuit of legal action for those who have suffered eye injuries.

Iran is not a State Party to the Rome Statute and this creates a legal challenge in the pursuit of justice for the people of Iran, however, human rights lawyers are actively pursuing mechanisms for justice. On 24 November 2022 the United Nations Human Right Council adopted a resolution for the establishment of an independent international Fact-Finding-Mission (FFM) on the Deteriorating situation of human rights in the Islamic Republic of Iran, especially with respect to women and children. On 18 March 2024 the FFM reported on its findings to the Office of the United Nations High Commissioner For Human Rights (OHCHR) at the fifty-fifth session of the General Assembly. In their report, based on information submitted to them, the FFM concluded that the State of Iran had violated human rights and committed acts amounting to crimes against humanity in their response to 2022 "Woman, Life, Freedom" protests.

The FFM asserted in its findings:

" The mission also investigated the use of weapons and ammunition in less lethal ways. According to reports by the High Council for Human Rights of the Islamic Republic of Iran, protesters caused widespread damage to private property and public and religious places. The mission corroborated some allegations of material destruction, but found that even the use of so-called less lethal force, such as tear gas or water cannons, was disproportionate because of their indiscriminate impact on protesters, especially those protesting peacefully. Moreover, while kinetic impact projectiles, such as rubber bullets, are categorized as less lethal, ammunition firing multiple rubber bullets in one shot risked and resulted in eye injuries and the blinding of protesters and bystanders." - FFM report to OHCHR at fifty-fifth General Assembly (A/HRC/55/67), page 5, paragraph 27.

"The mission established a pattern of ocular injuries of protesters and bystanders, including women and children, resulting in the partial or full loss of their eyesight, impacting their physical and mental health and, with regard to children, their education. A witness, who lost the sight in one eye, recalled a member of the security forces directing a paintball gun loaded with rubber bullets to the head from 1 m away. The mission notes the deterrent and chilling effect of such injuries, as they permanently marked the victims, essentially "branding" them as protesters. In a context where protests are effectively criminalized, the mission is satisfied that such an effect was intended." - FFM report to OHCHR at fifty-fifth General Assembly (A/HRC/55/67), page 5, paragraph 29.

"In addition to causing severe physical pain and mental suffering and devastation, the Mission notes the deterrent and chilling effect that injuries, in particular blindings, have on protesters. The Mission is satisfied that such effect was intended. A woman protester, who lost her sight in one eye, described the use of force by the security forces as a deliberate act of intimidation of protesters. She noted that injuries sustained by protesters not only impacted them but also affected their families and the people around them. "An injured protester means one less person on the streets", she said. Another woman protester described how the use of force was aimed at intimidating, saying "it is to create fear in society. You get shot and you scream, and people get the message." - Detailed findings, FFM (A/HRC/55/CRP.1), page 136, paragraph 489.

"The Mission established that protesters and bystanders, including children who were shot at, including with pellets and rubber bullets, sustained debilitating, severe and painful injuries during protests, which led to disabilities such as blindness. An expert opinion on the physical impact of ammunition such as birdshot and less-lethal weapons commissioned by the Mission highlighted irreversible injures and disabilities that could result from their use. In relation to kinetic impact projectiles specifically, the report highlighted bruising and lacerations of the skin, contusions and fractures of bone and muscle, internal bleeding, liver, heart, and kidney penetration, which could lead to organ failure or death, and neurovascular injuries. Injuries to the head could lead to haemorrhagic strokes and permanent disability while ocular injuries can result to permanent vision loss, given the large size of the projectile against the fragile bony structure and supple eye tissues. The report further stated that metal pellets, which are typically hunting rounds, are "indisputably lethal at close range" and have the ballistic capacity to penetrate some organs, including the eyes causing blindness." Detailed findings, FFM (A/HRC/55/CRP.1), page 155, paragraph 559.

=== Iran Protest Victims’ Complaint in Argentina 2025 ===
In December 2025, victims of Iran’s 2022 crackdown filed a criminal complaint against 40 officials. The complaint, submitted in Argentina, accuses the officials of crimes against humanity, torture and assault during the nationwide protests. Among the plaintiffs are protesters who suffered eye injuries, including Kowsar Eftekhari, who was blinded when plainclothes officers shot paintballs directly into her eye, and Mersedeh Shahinkar, who was injured and initially denied medical treatment because of her participation in the protests.

== Publicised fatalities ==
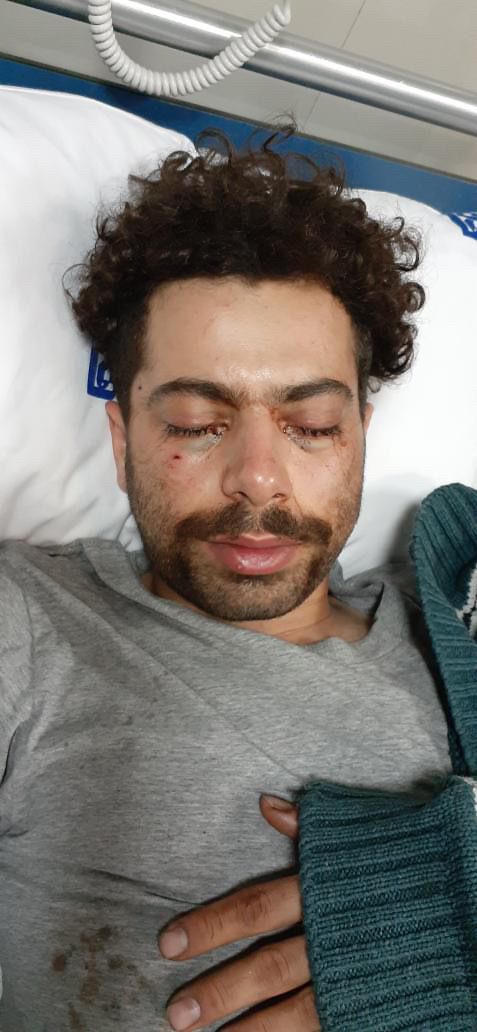
Mohammad Hossein Erfan

As with the number of people who suffered eye injuries as a result of KIPs, the true number of those who succumbed to their injuries, or died since their injury may never been known. Reports have highlighted few cases where families have shared the stories of their loved ones.

=== Mohammad Azad ===
Mohammad Azad (Persian: محمد ازاد), 46 years old at the time of injury, was attending a protest in Tehran in November 2022 when his right eye was severely injured and subsequently enucleated. Azad had faced severe financial and social pressure following his injury. On Saturday 7 September 2024, his death by cardiac arrest was announced by his wife via Instagram. He left behind his wife, and two children.

=== Mohammad Hossein Erfan ===
Mohammad Hossein Erfan (Persian: محمد حسین عرفان), 24 years old at the time of injury had been shot in Karaj when attending the November 2019 protests. He had been shot in the face by a pellet gun, resulting in complete blindness in his left eye, and only 30 percent vision in his right. Despite his injuries from 2019 and their continued impacts, witnesses state that Erfan attended the 2022 Woman, Life, Freedom protests and had even provided comfort and direction to those who had been injured on the streets at the time.

Erfan died unexpectedly late February, 2024 after being admitted to hospital reportedly with high blood sugar levels. Erfan was 28 years old at the time of death.

=== Sepehr Azami ===
Sepehr Azami (Persian: سپهر اعظمی), was 23 years old at the time of injury. Azami was attending protests in Karaj on 3 November 2022 (40th day ceremony commemorating the death of young protester Hadis Najafi) when he was shot multiple times by pellet guns. More than 80 pellets were discovered inside of his body, causing catastrophic damage, including to one of his eyes. Azami was in a comatose state in hospital for 33 days before succumbing to his injuries in 6 December 2022.

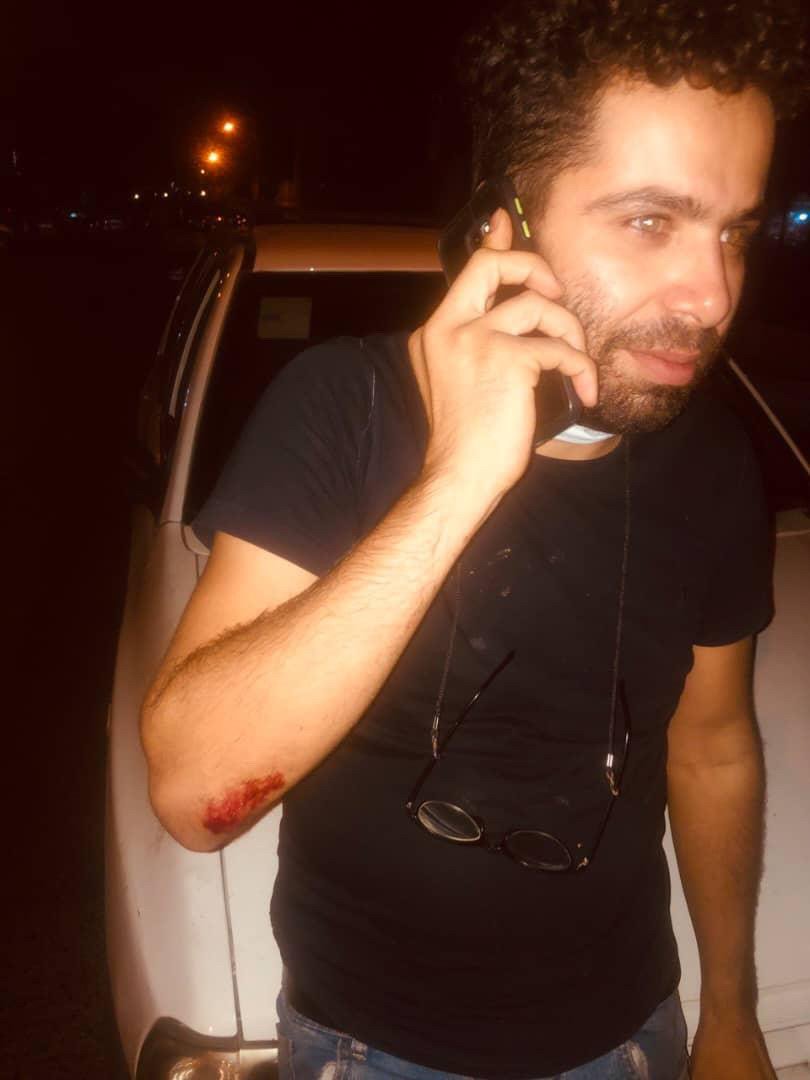
Mohammad Hossein Erfan at 2022 protests

=== Mohammad Hassanzadeh ===
Mohammad Hassanzadeh (Persian: محمد حسنزاده), 28 at the time of injury, Hassanzadeh joined protests early on in his hometown of Bukan. On one occasion when he went to protest he was shot at with a paintball gun, he continued to go to the streets, the next time he was shot with a pellet gun and a pellet planted into his left eye causing major damage. Hassanzadeh was forced to travel to Tehran for treatment after being turned away from multiple hospitals in his hometown and in the city of Tabriz. After his return to Bukan, Hassanzadeh continued to attend protests, until on 16 November 2022 when he was fatally wounded.

=== Seyed Javad Mousavi ===
Seyed Javad Mousavi (Persian: سید جواد موسوی), a father, was 39 years old when he was shot directly in the face, causing damage to both eyes. On 17 November 2022 Mousavi had been attending a protest in Isfahan when he was injured. After being shot he was separated from his group and witnesses say he was taken by security agents. His lifeless body was later found with a makeshift bandage covering both his eyes. He left behind a wife and two young children.

== Case studies ==
A special report by citizen journalism news site IranWire highlighted multiple case studies of people who had suffered eye injuries. The list released by IHRNGO confirms the accounts by IranWire reports. The detailed case studies including information on weapons used, geographic location and age of those injured demonstrates the systematic nature of these injuries, discounting potential for incidental eye injury at protests.

=== Trauma to both eyes ===
==== Parsa Ghobadi ====
Parsa Ghobadi (Parsa Qobadi, Persian: پارسا قبادی), was 18 years old at the time of injury. Ghobadi was attending a protest in his hometown of Kermanshah on 21 November 2022 when he was shot by a pellet gun causing damage to both eyes. Ghobadi was detained after being attacked and access to medical treatment was denied. Ghobadi has spoken publicly about the torture he had been exposed to while in detention. Ghobadi was able to regain 40% of vision in his right eye after multiple operations.

==== Matin Mannani ====
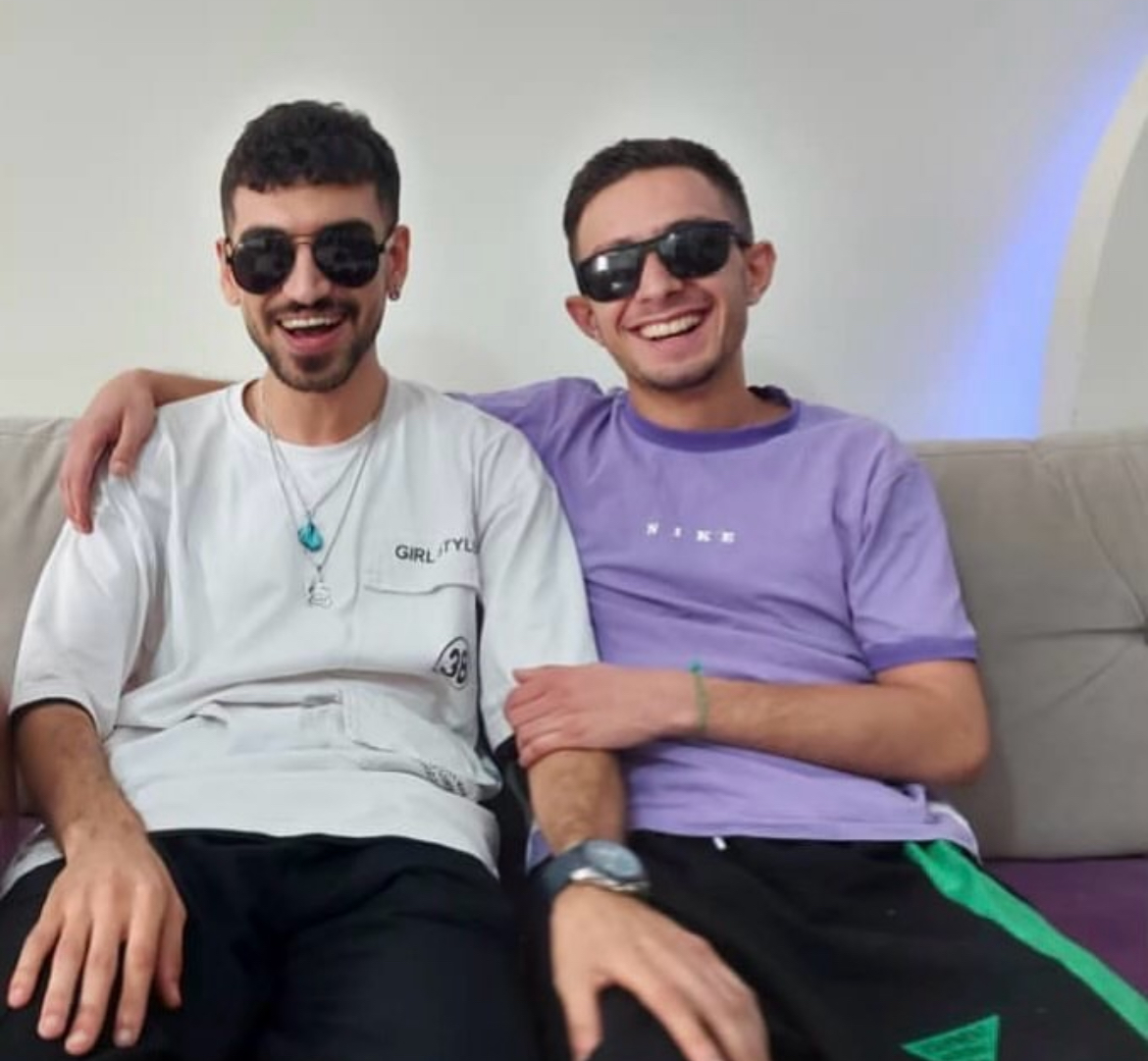
(L-R) Matin Mannani and Hossein Naderbeigi

Matin Mannani (Seyed Matin Manani, Persian: متین منانی), a university student, was 25 years old at the time of injury. Mannani had been attending a protest in Sari on 20 September 2022 when he was shot multiple times with a pellet gun resulting in irreparable damage to both eyes and rendering him completely blind.

==== Hossein Naderbeigi ====
Hossein Naderbeigi (Hossein Naderbigi, Persian: حسین نادربیگی) a laborer, was 22 years old at the time of injury. Naderbeigi was not actively attending a protest when he was shot. On 3 November 2022 in his hometown of Karaj he was passing by where a protest was taking place as it was the 40th day commemoration ceremony after the death of young protester Hadis Najafi. Naderbeigi was shot repeated at close range by a pellet gun, including directly in his face. Naderbeigi sustained significant and irreparable damage to both eyes resulting in permanent blindness.

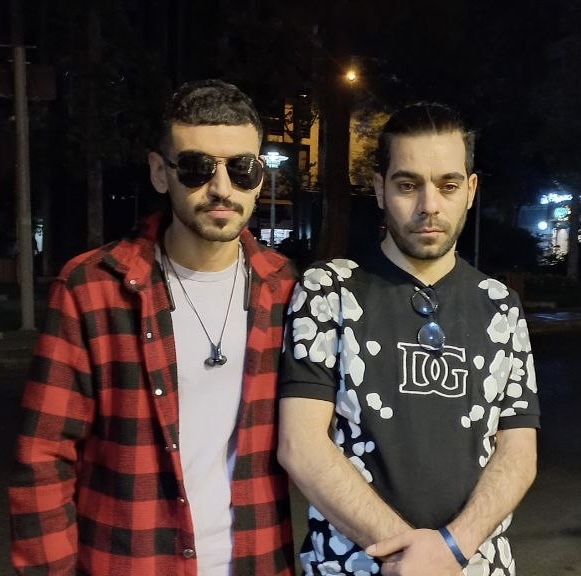
(L-R) Matin Mannani and Ali Tahoune

==== Mohammad Parsa Sehat ====
Mohammad Parsa Sehat (Persian: محمد پارسا صحت), a barber, was 22 years old at the time of injury. Sehat is one of the first recorded cases of eye injury, he was shot with a pellet gun near the salon where he worked in the birthplace of Mahsa "Jina" Amini just a day after her death, in Saqqez on 17 September 2022. Sehat sustained significant damage to both eyes, with one eye having no usable vision, and the other being able to see up to a distance of two meters.

==== Ali Tahoune ====
Ali Tahoune (Ali Tahouneh, Persian: علی طاحونه), a mechanic, was 34 years old at the time of injury. Tahoune was attending a protest in Karaj on 22 September 2022 when he was shot directly in the face by a pellet gun after seeing a green laser pointed at his face. Tahoune sustained damage to both eyes, after multiple operations can see enough out of his left eye to be able to use his phone and get around somewhat independently.

Other confirmed cases
Name	Age*	Date	City / Province	Weapon**
Hamid Parsa	Unknown	21 September 2022	Tehran	Pellet Gun
Soheil	29	15 November 2022	Shiraz	Pellet Gun
Yasin	12	30 September 2022	Zahedan	Bullet
Karu Feizi	20	15 November 2022	Bukan	Pellet Gun
Firouz Mirani	29	29 November 2022	Paveh	Pellet Gun
Mohammad Safiari	Unknown	19 November 2022	Tehran	Pellet Gun
Farideh Salavatipour	~40	16 November 2022	Sanandaj	Pellet Gun
Zaniyar Tondro	17	27 October 2022	Piranshahr	Pellet Gun
*Age at the time of injury **Information from IHRNGO Report Iran Protests 2022: Women protesters eyes intentionally and systematically targeted.

=== Trauma to one eye ===
==== Hossein Abedini ====
Hossein Abedini (Persian: حسین عابدینی), a model, was 20 years old at the time of injury. Abedini had been attending protests in Tehran on 21 September 2022 when was shot with a pellet gun causing permanent damage to his left eye.

==== Niloofar Aghaee ====
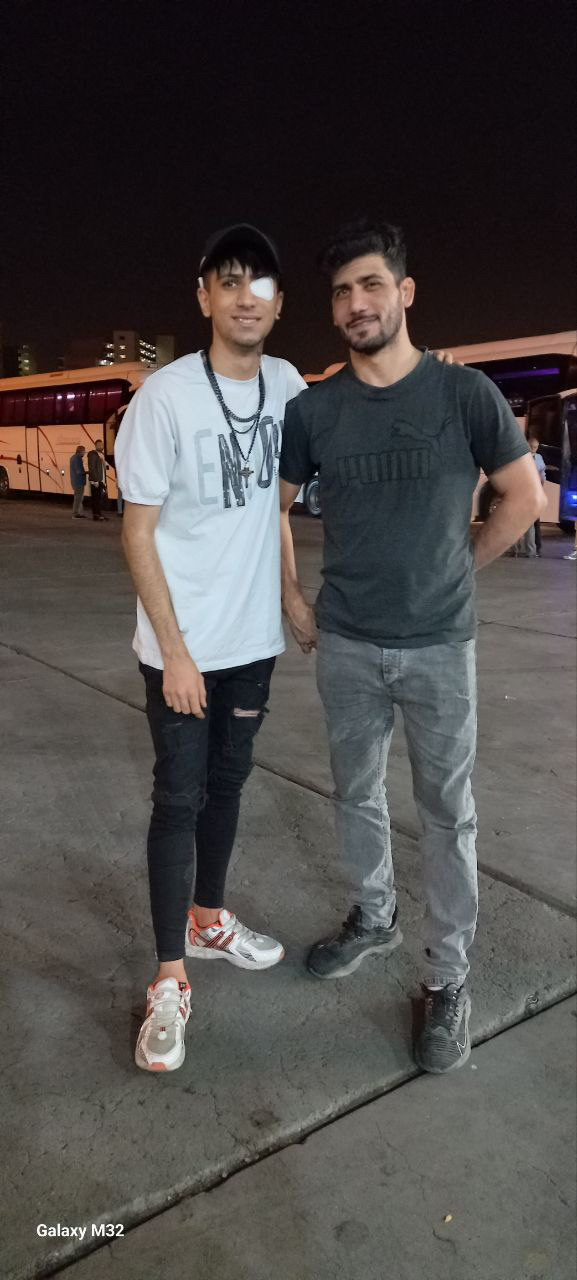
(L-R) Artin Ahmadi and Yaser "Alvand" Alvandiani

Niloofar Aghaee (Niloufar Aghayi, Persian: نیلوفر آقایی), a midwife, 31 years old at the time of injury, was attending a protest on 26 October 2022 (the 40th day ceremony after the death of Mahsa "Jina" Amini) with other medical staff outside of the Medical Council in Tehran. Aghaee was hit in the left eye by a paintball gun. Doctors were unable to restore her vision.

==== Artin Ahmadi ====
Artin Ahmadi (Persian: آرتین احمدی) a tattoo artist, was 18 years old at the time of injury. Ahmadi was attending a protest in his hometown of Sanandaj on 17 November 2022 when he was shot multiple times with a pellet gun. Ahmadi was left with over 60 pellets in his body, including one that caused permanent damage to his left eye.

==== Yaser "Alvand" Alvandiani ====
Yaser "Alvand" Alvandiani (Persian: یاسر الوندیانی), a father, woodcarver and athlete, was 34 years old at the time of injury. Alvandiani was attending protests in his hometown of Hamedan on 20 September 2022 when security forces began firing into the crowd. He sought refuge in an alley where he was cornered by three policemen and shot multiple times with pellet guns, causing irreparable damage to his left eye.

==== Rahele Amiri ====
Rahele Amiri (Raheleh Amiri, Persian: راحله امیری), a psychologist, was 29 years old at the time of injury. Amiri had been attending a protest in her hometown city of Kerman on 15 November 2022 when she was hit by metal pellets fired from a pellet gun, causing irreparable damage to her right eye.

==== Hossein Ashtari ====
Hossein Ashtari (Persian: حسین اشتری), a tattoo artist, was 22 years old at the time of injury. Ashtari had been part of a student sit-in protest in Karaj on 9 October 2022 when he was hit in his left eye with a paintball gun, causing significant trauma to the eye.

==== Helia Babayi ====
Helia Babayi (Persian: هلیا بابایی) was 16 years old at the time of injury. Babayi had become trapped inside of a mall in Isfahan with her father and others on 26 October 2022 (the 40th day ceremony after the death of Mahsa "Jina" Amini), when riot police had closed off entrances. Babayi was shot at by a pellet gun, causing irreparable damage to her right eye.

==== Ali Delpasand ====
Ali Delpasand (Ali Delpasand Moghadam, Persian: علی دلپسند), a father, was 43 years old at the time of injury. On the night of 15 November 2022, Delpasand and his family were in the car honking in support of the protesters in their hometown of Rasht when he was hit with a pellet gun, pellets causing irreparable damage to his right eye.

==== Kosar Eftekhari ====
Kosar Eftekhari (Kowsar Eftekhari, Persian: کوثر افتخاری), a theatre actress, was 22 years old at the time of injury. Eftekhari was attending a protest on 12 October 2022 in Tehran when she was shot with a paintball gun causing irreparable damage to her right eye.

==== Benita Kiani Falavarjani ====
Benita Kiani Falavarjani (Bonita Kiani Falavarjani, Persian: بنیتا کیانی فالورجانی), was five years old at the time of injury. Benita was playing on the balcony at her grandparents house in Isfahan on 15 November 2022 when she was struck by metal pellets losing vision in her right eye.

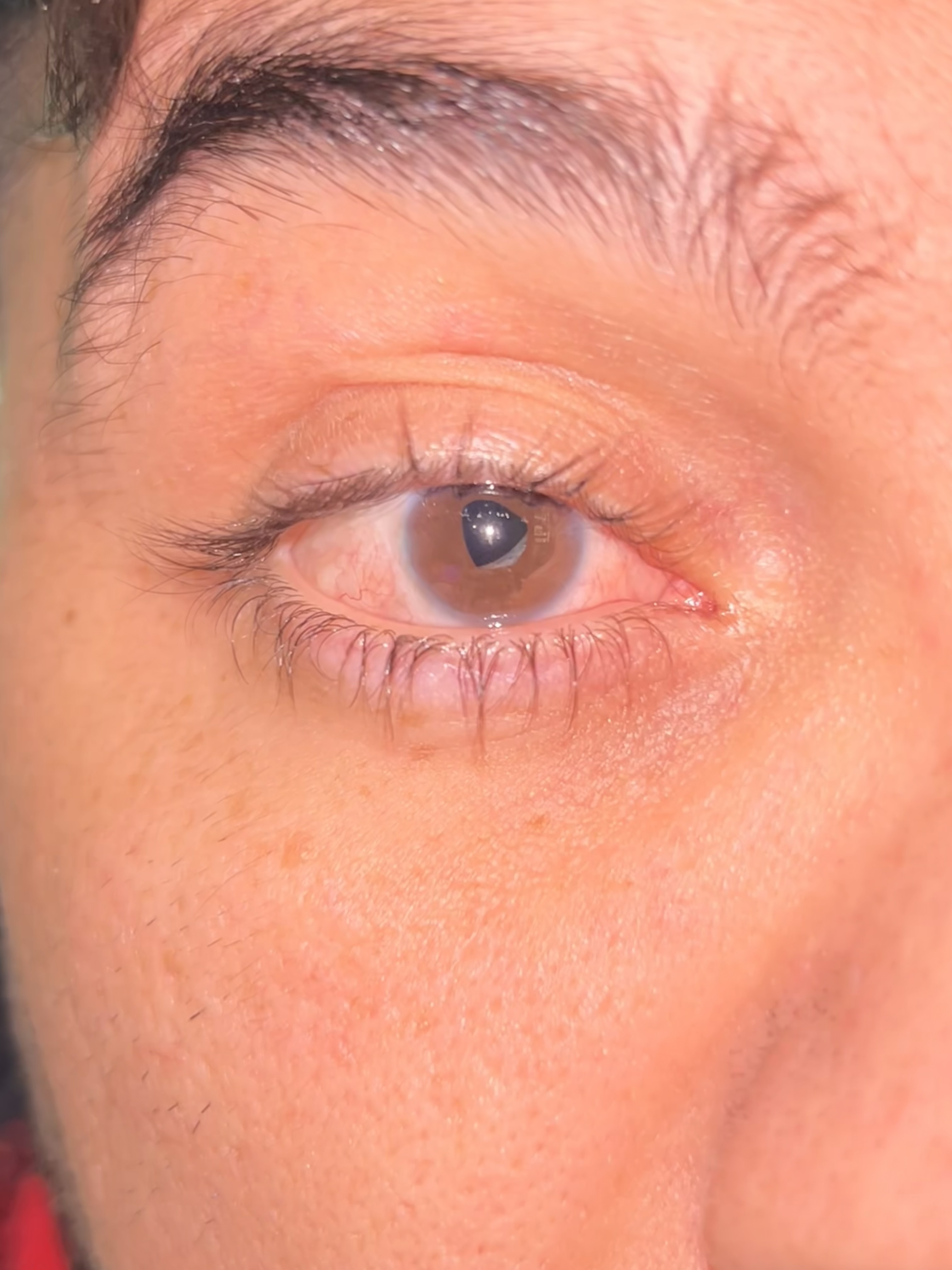
Mohammad Farzi's right eye

==== Mohammad Farzi ====
Mohammad Farzi (Persian: محمد فرضی), an athlete, musician and artist known for his character The Joker of Tehran, was 32 years old at the time of injury. Farzi was attending protests in Tehran on 22 September 2022 when he was shot with a pellet gun after rescuing a woman who was being dragged away by the hair by security agents. One pellet lodged inside of Farzi's right eye, causing significant and irreparable damage.

==== Hamid Ghasempor Farsani ====
Hamid Ghasempor Farsani (Persian: حمید قاسمپور فارسانی), a shopkeeper, was 37 years old at the time of injury. In April 2022 he had attended protests in his home town of Farsan, protesting against poor living conditions, when he was shot with a pellet gun at close range. Farsani has 23 pellets remaining in his head and irreparable damage to his right eye. Farsani was initially, mistakenly reported in local news outlets as having been killed.

==== Mohsen Kafshgar ====
Mohsen Kafshgar (Mohsen Kafshegar, Persian: محسن کفشگر), a children's rights activist, was 31 at the time of injury. Kafshgar was shot directly in the face with a pellet gun in his hometown of Amol on 28 October 2022, causing loss of vision to his left eye.

==== Majid Khademi ====
Majid Khademi (Majid Khademi Taher, Persian: مجید خادمی), a PhD student, had been attending the 40th day ceremony commemorating the death of young protester Hadis Najafi on 3 November 2022 in Karaj when he was shot with a pellet gun, causing irreparable damage to his left eye.

==== Hamid Reza Khajepoor ====
Hamid Reza Khajepoor (Hamidreza Khajepour, Persian: حمیدرضا خواجه پور), an interior designer, was 24 years old at the time of injury. Khajepoor was attending a protest in Kerman on 15 November 2022 when he was shot multiple times with a pellet gun, a pellet causing irreparable damage to his right eye.

==== Mahbanou Khoshnoudi ====
Mahbanou Khoshnoudi (Kosar Khosnoodi Kia, Kowsar Khoshnoudi Kia, Persian: مهبانو خشنودی), a professional archer, was 27 years old at the time of injury. Khoshnoudi was attending a protest with her father on 9 December 2022 in the city of Kermanshah when she was shot at with a pellet gun causing irreparable damage to her left eye.

==== Nachirvan Maroufi ====
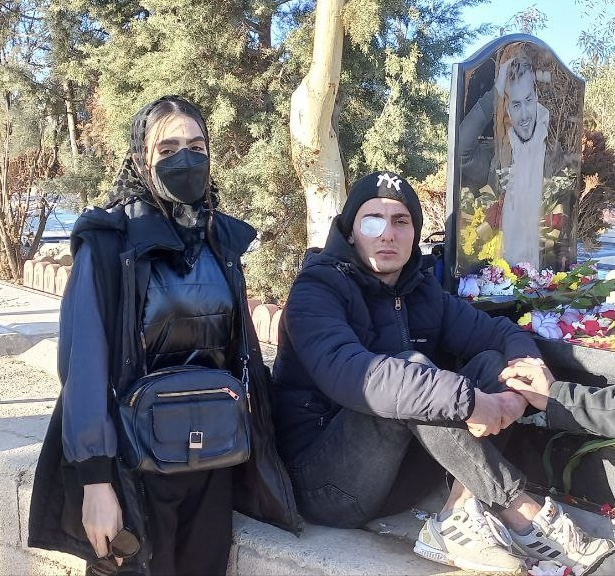
Kimia Zand and Ali Zarei at grave site of Hamidreza Rouhi

Nachirvan Maroufi (Nechirvan Maroufi, Persian: نچیروان معروفی), a conscripted soldier on leave, was 18 years old at the time of injury. Nachirvan had been in the city of Mahsa "Jina" Amini's birthplace, Saqqez, on 17 September 2022 when he was shot with a pellet gun, causing irreparable damage to his right eye.

==== Ali Mohammadi ====
Ali Mohammadi (Persian: علی محمدی), a barber, was 22 years old at the time of injury. Mohammadi was attending protests in Hamedan on 21 September 2022 when he was shot with a pellet gun causing irreparable damage to his left eye.

==== Zoha Mousavi ====
Zoha Mousavi (Persian: ضحا موسوی), a beautician, was 25 years old at the time of injury. Mousavi was attending a protest in Isfahan on 1 October 2022 when she was shot with a paintball gun resulting in vision loss in her left eye.

==== Saman Pouriyaghma ====
Saman Pouryaghma (Persian: سامان پوریغما), an export consultant, was 30 years old at the time of injury. Pouryaghma was on his motorbike on Valiasr Street in Tehran when he was shot directly in the face by paintball gun, causing significant damage and loss of sight in his left eye.

==== Ghazal Ranjkesh ====
Ghazal Ranjkesh (Mohadase Ranjkesh, Persian: غزل رنجکش), a law student, was 21 at the time of injury. Ranjkesh was attending a protest in her hometown of Bandar Abbas on 15 November 2022 when she was shot at close range by a pellet gun. Damage to her eye was extensive and her doctors were unable to save it. Her right eye was subsequently enucleated.

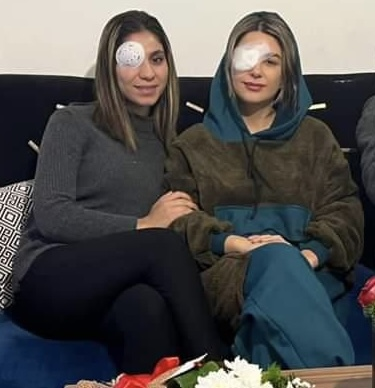
(L-R) Kosar Eftekhari and Elahe Tavakolian

==== Farid Rashidi ====
Farid Rashidi (Persian: فرید رشیدی), a barber, was 30 years old at the time of injury. Rashidi had been attending a protest in Bandar Abbas on 15 November 2022 when he was shot with a pellet gun. Four pellets entered his left eye causing irreparable damage.

==== Mersedeh Shahinkar ====
Mersedeh Shahinkar (Mercede Shahinkar, Mercedeh Shahinkar Persian: مرسده شاهین‌کار), a mother and personal trainer, was 38 years old at the time of injury. Shahinkar had been attending a protest in Tehran with her mother on 15 October 2022 when she was shot in the eye with a paintball gun causing irreversible damage to her right eye.

==== Sadegh Sufi ====
Sadegh Sufi (Sadegh Sofi, Persian: صادق صوفی), a personal trainer, was 27 years old at the time of injury. Sufi had been attending a protest on 26 October 2022 (the 40th day ceremony after the death of Mahsa "Jina" Amini) in Bukan when was shot with a pellet gun, causing irreparable damage to his right eye.

==== Elaheh Tavakolian ====
Elaheh Tavakolian (Persian: الهه توکلیان), mother to twins, PhD student, was 34 years old at the time of injury. Tavakolian was at a protest with her 10 year old twins in Mashhad on 20 September 2022 when she was shot in the face by a pellet gun, causing irreparable damage to her right eye.

==== Amir Velayati ====
Amir Velayati (Amir Shah-Velayati, Persian: امیر والیتی), a barber, was 24 years old at the time of injury. On 24 September 2022, Velayati was attending a protest in Tehran when he was shot with a pellet gun, causing irreparable damage to his left eye.

==== Kimia Zand ====
Kimia Zand (Persian: کیمیا زند), was 26 years old at the time of injury. Zand was attending a protest in Tehran on 26 October 2022 (the 40th day ceremony after the death of Mahsa "Jina" Amini) when she was hit in the right eye with a paintball bullet.

Other confirmed cases
Name and Side (R/L)	Age*	Date	City / Province	Weapon**
Amirhossein (L)	23	16 November 2022	Tehran	Paintball Gun
Bahman (R)	21	10 October 2022	Mahabad	Pellet Gun
Danial (L)	48	December 2022	Tehran	Projectile through car windshield
Elham (L)	35	11 November 2022	Hormozgan	Pellet Gun
Iman (L)	34	Late October 2022	Lorestan	Pellet Gun
Mohammad Reza (R)	30	26 October 2022	Isfahan	Pellet Gun
Mostafa (L)	31	Late September 2022	Chaharmahal and Bakhtiari Province	Pellet Gun
Mostaneh (L)	23	Unknown	Piranshahr	Pellet Gun
Nazanin (L)	16	15 November 2022	Bandar Abbas	Pellet Gun
Sara (L)	21	3 November 2022	Karaj	Pellet Gun
Zara (R)	18	22 September 2022	Tehran	Tear Gas Canister
Vahid Abbasi Piani (side unknown)	28	15 November 2022	Izeh	Pellet Gun
Ayoub Abdollahi (R)	23	11 October 2022	Saqqez	Pellet Gun
Nemat Afshar (L)	36	20 September 2022	Qazvin	Pellet Gun
Maryam Babayi (L)	Unknown	24 September 2022	Tehran	Pellet Gun
Hossein Bagherpour (R)	24	15 November 2022	Kerman	Paintball Gun
Matin Chakav (R)	18	12 October 2022	Abadan	Pellet Gun
Hamed Davoudi (R)	30	26 October 2022	Isfahan	Pellet Gun
Meisam Dehghani (R)	28	15 November 2022	Bandar Abbas	Pellet Gun
Kian Derakhshan (R)	22	17 September 2022	Saqqez	Pellet Gun
Reza Ezati (R)	47	3 November 2022	Karaj	Pellet Gun
Mojtaba Fadayi (L)	Unknown	24 September 2022	Junghan	Pellet Gun
Mani Haji Hassan (R)	16	29 December 2022	Tehran	Tear Gas Canister
Saman Hemati (R)	22	18 November 2022	Abadan	Pellet Gun
Ahmad Naeim Hirmandzad (L)	59	9 October 2022	Hirmand	Brass Knuckles
Samane Hosseini (R)	25	16 November 2022	Tehran	Paintball Gun
Behrouz Hosseini (L)	21	15 November 2024	Isfahan	Pellet Gun
Seyed Mohammad Hosseini Payiz (R)	Unknown	18 November 2022	Unknown	Pellet Gun
Hossein Hosseinpour (R)	25	17 November 2022	Mahabad	Pellet Gun
Parviz Javani (L)	27	12 October 2022	Kermanshah	Pellet Gun
Asal Jazideh (L)	17	1 October 2022	Rasht	Pellet Gun
Ali Khaleghi (L)	24	15 October 2022	Kerman	Paintball Gun
Sepehr Khaleghi (R)	28	15 November 2022	Tehran	Tear Gas Canister
Nima Khoujmali (L)	20	20 September 2022	Gonbad Kavous	Pellet Gun
Abbas Ali Maghboun (R)	49	20 September 2022	Kish	Pellet Gun
Mehdi "Metty" Meighani (R)	19	20 September 2022	Arak	Pellet Gun
Shahin Milan (L)	22	19 November 2022	Khoy	Pellet Gun
Hamed Ali Mohammadi (R)	37	22 September 2022	Karaj	Pellet Gun
Ziba Mostafazadeh (L)	35	3 November 2022	Hashtgerd	Pellet Gun
Mostafa Motalebi (L)	34	15 November 2022	Tehran	Pellet Gun
Erfan Mousavi (R)	18	21 September 2022	Tabriz	Pellet Gun
Majid Movafegh (L)	37	21 September 2022	Karaj	Pellet Gun
Hirsh Naghshbandi (L)	Unknown	22 September 2022	Sanandaj	Pellet Gun
Hossein Nouri Nikou (L)	25	20 September 2022	Tehran	Pellet Gun
Hamidreza Panahi (L)	27	15 November 2022	Tehran	Pellet Gun
Kamal Pishvand (L)	41	12 October 2022	Mahabad	Pellet Gun
Ahmad Pirhaghir (R)	26	12 October 2022	Saqqez	Pellet Gun
Kiyarash Pour Rasoul (L)	27	29 October 2022	Lasht Nesha	Pellet Gun
Massoud Rahimpour (R)	33	19 September 2022	Saqqez	Pellet Gun
Sajad Rahmatipour (L)	25	17 October 2022	Abdanan	Pellet Gun
Erfan Ramizipour (R)	19	15 November 2022	Bandar Abbas	Pellet Gun
Ali Mohammad Rezaei (L)	60	18 November 2022	Abdanan	Pellet Gun
Younes Rigi (R)	26	14 October 2022	Zahedan	Pellet Gun
Vahed Rouznavard (L)	21	12 October 2022	Mahabad	Pellet Gun
Milad Safari (L)	35	22 September 2022	Karaj	Pellet Gun
Arvin Salimi (L)	22	27 October 2022	Dehgalan	Pellet Gun
Hosein Shahi (L)	24	26 October 2022	Tehran	Paintball Gun
Erfan Shakouri (R)	13	21 September 2022	Rezvanshahr	Pellet Gun
Mohammad Vakili (R)	31	21 September 2022	Hamedan	Pellet Gun
Salar Vatankhah (R)	23	15 November 2022	Karaj	Pellet Gun
Ali Zarei (R)	23	7 October 2022	Tehran	Paintball Gun
*Age at the time of injury **Information from IHRNGO Report Iran Protests 2022: Women protesters eyes intentionally and systematically targeted.

== Eyes for Freedom ==
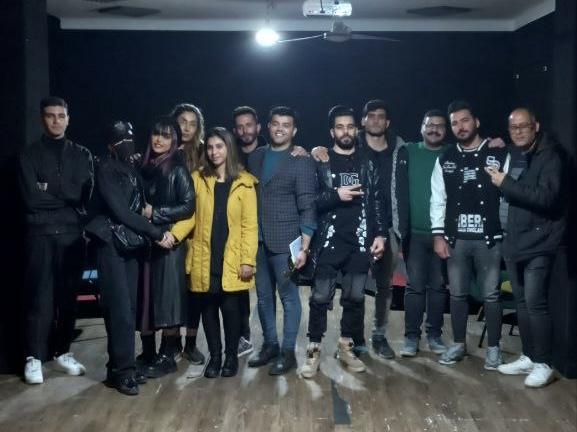
(L-R) Hossein Abedini, Zoha Mousavi, Kosar Eftekhari, Mohammad Farzi, Ali Tahoune, Yaser Alvandiani, Mohsen Kafshegar and Ali Mohammadi, gathered together with other members of the group.

The Eyes for Freedom (Persian: Cheshm Baraye Azadi, چشم برای آزادی) movement started in the aftermath the Woman, Life, Freedom protests in Iran, sparked by the death-in-custody in September 2022 of 22-year-old Mahsa "Jina" Amini. The movement was built through activism of people who had sustained significant eye injuries as a result of participating in, or being near protests. The aim was to build a support network and to increase awareness of the people who were now faced with lifelong disability.

On 19 October 2022, Mersedeh Shahinkar shared pictures of her injured eye via social media platform Instagram. She had been shot by a paintball gun at a protest just four days earlier. A month later, a man known by the pseudonym Saman, who after being blinded in one eye at a protest on 2 October 2022 left the country. Once outside of the country, Saman gave an interview with the New York Times, which published a story on 19 November 2022 that brought international attention to the practice of direct shooting in the faces of protesters. The New York Times had also gathered information from doctors and people inside of Iran that indicated over 500 people had suffered major injury to their eyes.

Several others gained global attention, including then 21 year old law student Ghazal Ranjkesh who posted a picture of herself to social media with the quote: "When you shot me from a distance of two meters and smiled, were you thinking that I would survive and smile back at you?", and Niloofar Aghaee, a 32 year old midwife, who was shot at a protest with other medical staff. What started as individuals publicly sharing their stories, led to the formation of a group inside of Iran of those with eye injuries, led by Shahinkar along with Mohammad Farzi (also known as the Joker of Tehran), who reached out to other injured protesters via Instagram. The formation of this group marked a critical moment, providing protesters dealing with effects of their injuries a much needed support system. This group also allowed for the introduction of medical staff and psychologists who were providing services safely for injured protesters. The unprecedented number of eye injuries in the country due to the systematic nature of the targeting of the eyes, had led to a shortage of supply of critical medications and availability of surgery appointments.

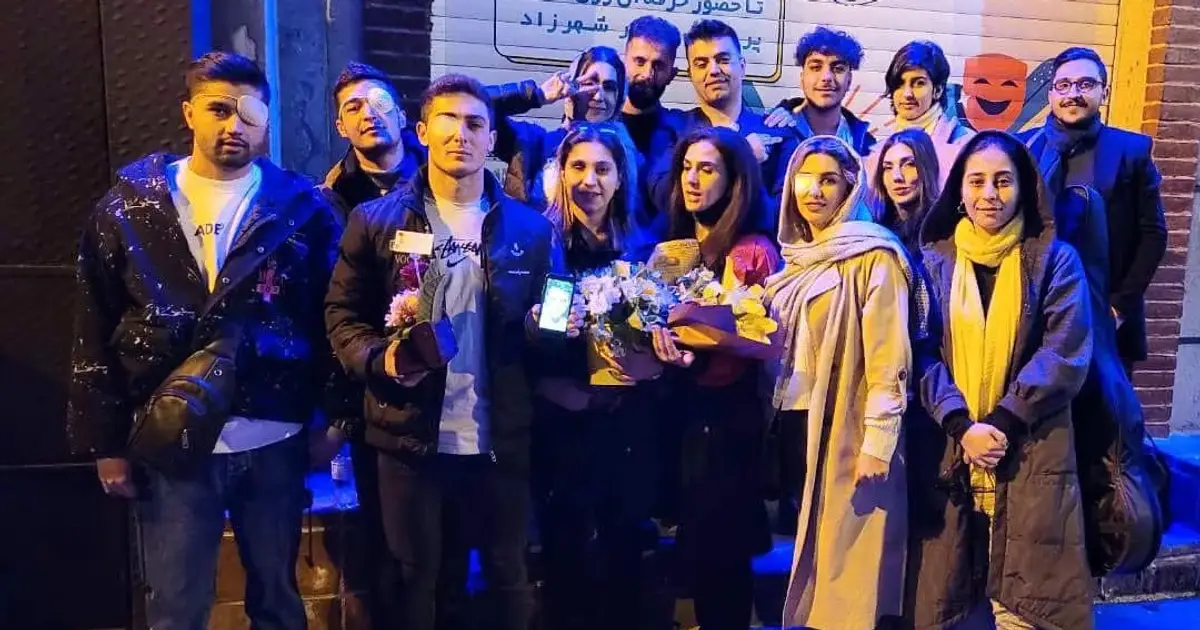
(L-R) Amir Velayati, Hossein Noori, Ali Zarei, Kosar Eftekhari, Kimia Zand, Mohammad Farzi and Elaheh Tavakolian. Taken 2 February 2023.

The formation of a group amongst those injured allowed for channels to be opened to urgently source required medical supplies across the country, or from connections from outside, as well as accompanying one another and providing critical support for medical procedures and surgeries. The group was able to fundraise for medical procedures as many of those injured were unable to return to work. The formation of the group also served another purpose, to unite the individual stories in an attempt to draw global attention to the number of people impacted and their lives before and after losing their eye/s.

This activism, and being a visible member of this group did not come without great personal cost to injured protesters. Activity on Instagram was monitored by the regime and those who were most active and their families were targets of threats and arbitrary court summons and arrests. Amir Velayati was unable to access critical treatment for his injured eye as he was arrested and held in Evin Prison for a month. Since his release after being arrested in May 2023, Velayati continued to face legal challenges and was arrested again in February 2024. Velayati faces charges of "rebellion", "activities and effective efforts to advance the goals of groups that have launched an armed uprising against the Islamic government" and "disruption of public ordeal. Similarly, Matin Hassani was also summoned and charged with spreading anti-state propaganda. He has been sentenced to 31 months in prison. Kosar Eftekhari who had posted photos to her Instagram page in public without mandatory hijab had been handed a sentence of almost five years in prison and forced to flee the country.

Ali Zarei haș been sentenced to death by Branch 23 of the Tehran Revolutionary Court. Zarei had been residing in Germany after fleeing Iran where he had been facing prosecution for his involvement in advocacy for those killed in 2022 protests and the Eyes for Freedom Movement. Zarei is charged with "Corruption of Earth". According to Human Rights Activists in Iran (HRANA), it has been alleged that Zarei is charged with engaging in extensive political activities, creating the appearance of fabricated damages, producing false reports, propaganda against the regime, disrupting security, and illegally entering and exiting the country.

Despite the constant threats to their safety, the group continued to build and raise awareness. The group allowed for a shared strength to build and show the world that life and their fight for freedom continues. Eyes for Freedom became a hashtag and a symbol for the resilience of those who had sacrificed their eyes in their pursuit of a free Iran and a normal life.

== Responses ==
=== Government response ===
In the height of the protests where majority of injuries took place, the Islamic Republic's response included deploying ambulances to transport injured protesters directly to detention facilities, refusing access to treatment, threatening and arresting medical staff for providing aid to injured protesters, and had posted guards at entrances of hospitals to note the names of anyone coming in with injuries sustained at protests. Many were forced to resort to home remedies until it was safe to seek treatment, and when they were able to access a hospital, they were unable to state the true cause of their injury for fear of being turned away or turned in to authorities. This was particularly detrimental in the case of eye injuries that require urgent care in order to preserve visual acuity.

=== Propaganda ===
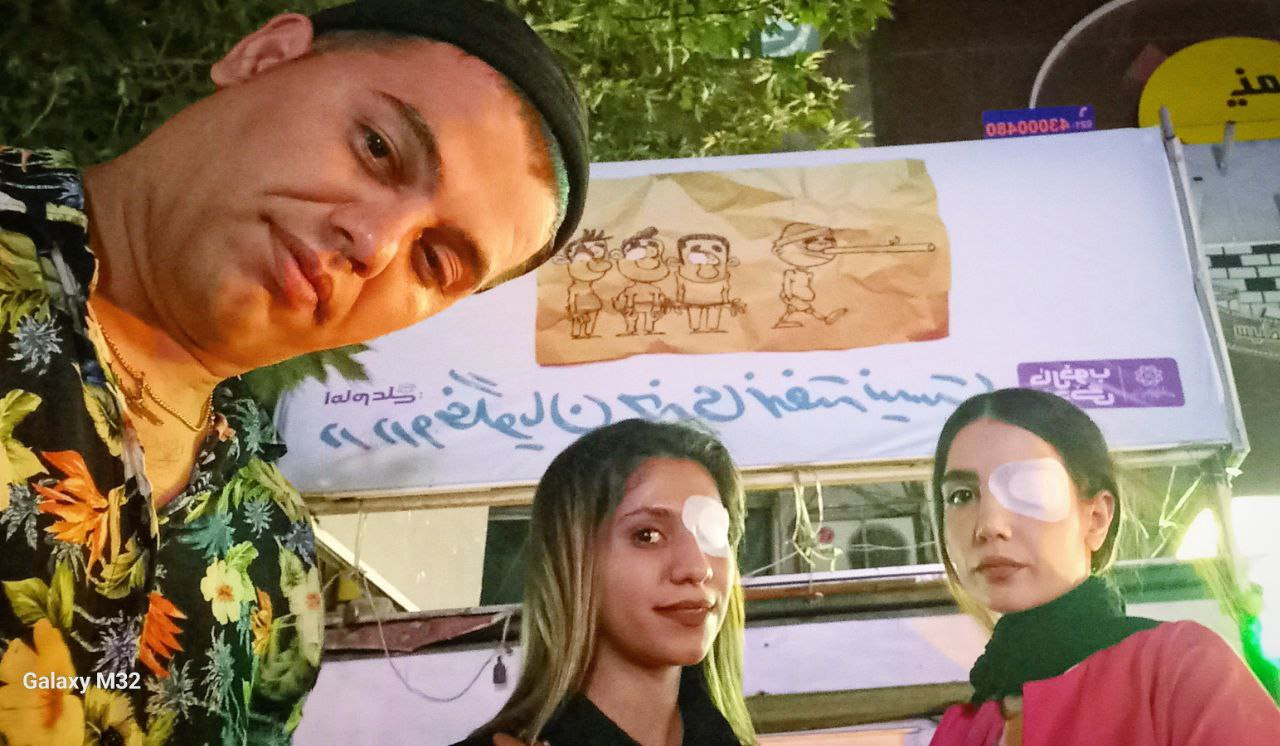
(L-R) Mohammad Farzi (wearing the shirt he was wearing the night he was shot), Kosar Eftekhari and Kimia Zand stand in front of a banner in Iran that reads: "there are no good intentions with liars" wearing eyepatches led by a man with a Pinocchio like nose.

As the Eyes for Freedom hashtag grew and the group garnered global attention, the government responded by attempting to discredit injured protesters. In Tehran, banners were installed in May 2023 with a cartoon image of men with eye patches, one with a long wooden nose, a reference to fictional character Pinocchio whose wooden nose grows when he lies. Under the image were the words: "There are no good intentions with liars" (Persian: در دروغگویان خیری نهفته نیست). The government has continued to deny that any protesters suffered eye injuries.

=== Global public reaction ===
On 8 April 2023 Angelina Jolie made a post in solidarity with those who had suffered injuries, sharing quotes and images of Elaheh Tavokolian and Zaniyar Tondro. Multiple Iranian artists both inside and outside of Iran expressed solidarity. Singer Roozbeh Bemani released a song called "Your Eyes" (Persian: چشمات) in solidarity with the movement. In rallies around the world demonstrators donned eye patches and displayed photos of victims to help raise awareness of the issue.
