= Gol Gol-e Olya =

Gol Gol-e Olya or Golgol-e Olya (Persian: گل گل عليا) may refer to:

- Gol Gol-e Olya, Abdanan, in Ilam Province
- Gol Gol-e Olya, Malekshahi, in Ilam Province
- Gol Gol-e Olya, Lorestan
