= Mulab-e Olya =

Mulab-e Olya مولاب عليا
- Village
- Location within Iran
- Coordinates: 32°41′26″N 47°43′53″E
- Country: Iran
- Province: Ilam
- County: Abdanan
- Bakhsh: Kalat
- Rural District: Murmuri

Population (2006)
  - Total: 112
- Time zone: UTC+3:30 (IRST)
  - Summer (DST): UTC+4:30 (IRDT)

Mulab-e Olya (Persian: مولاب عليا, also Romanized as Mūlāb-e ‘Olyā; also known as Kelāt, Mūlāb, Mūlāb-e Bālā, and Ţāqeh Mūlāb) is a village in Murmuri Rural District, Kalat District, Abdanan County, Ilam Province, Iran. At the 2006 census, its population was 112, in 25 families. The village is populated by Lurs.
