= Sarabbagh =

City in Ilam province, Iran

Sarabbagh Persian: سراب‌باغ
- City
- Location within Iran Location within Ilam Province
- Coordinates: 32°53′55″N 47°34′18″E
- Country: Iran
- Province: Ilam
- County: Abdanan
- District: Sarabbagh

Population (2016)
  - Total: 2,659
- Time zone: UTC+3:30 (IRST)

Sarabbagh (Persian: سراب‌باغ) (Note: Also romanized as Sarāb Bāgh and Sarābbāgh) is a city in, and the capital of, Sarabbagh District of Abdanan County, Ilam province, Iran. It also serves as the administrative center for Sarabbagh Rural District. Sarabbagh was the capital of the county until its capital was transferred to the city of Abdanan.

== Demographics ==
=== Ethnicity ===
The city is populated by Kurds.

=== Population ===
At the time of the 2006 National Census, the city's population was 2,273 in 458 households, when it was a village in Sarabbagh Rural District. The following census in 2011 counted 2,557 people in 608 households. The 2016 census measured the population of the city as 2,659 people in 731 households, by which time the Sarabbagh had been elevated to the status of a city.
