= Heliveh Castle =

Castle in Ilam Province, Iran

Heliveh castle
- قلعه هلیوه

General information
- Type: Castle
- Location: Abdanan County, Iran

Heliveh castle (Persian: قلعه هلیوه) is a historical castle, located in Abdanan County in Ilam Province, dating back to the Sasanian Empire.
