= Kalkal =

Kalkal or Kal Kal or Kol Kol (Persian: كل كل) may refer to:

- Kol Kol, Kermanshah
- Kalkal, Khuzestan
- Kalkal (god), a Mesopotamian god

== See also ==
- Kol Kol (disambiguation)
