= Mersedeh Shahinkar =

Iranian activist (born 1984)

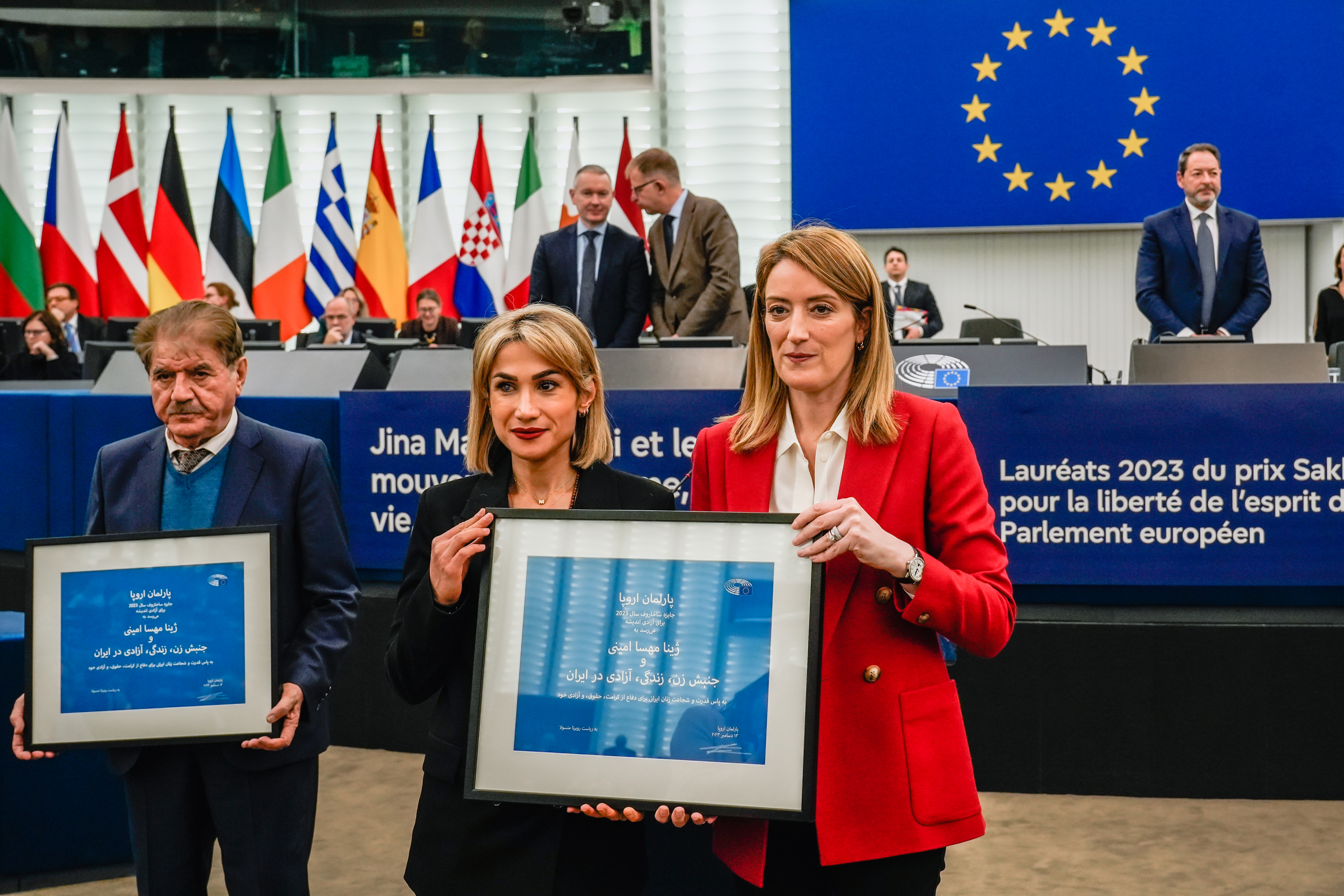
- Mersedeh Shahinkar (in the middle) at the EP 2023 Sakharov Prize ceremony on 12 December 2023
- Born: 1984 (age 41–42); Rasht, Iran
- Occupation: Political activist
- Movement: Woman, Life, Freedom movement
- Children: 1
- Awards: Sakharov Prize (2023); The National Endowment for Democracy Award (2023); The Politiken’s Freedom Prize (2024)

Mersedeh Shahinkar (born 1984) is an Iranian political activist. She won the Sakharov Prize in 2023 as a part of the Woman, Life, Freedom movement together with Afsoon Najafi. In 2022 Iranian protests after Mahasa Amini's death by the Iranian regime, she lost her right eye as she was shot by a security agent. The government of Iran has called her a "threat to the country's security". In March 2023, due to growing concerns about her safety and the continued pressure from the regime, Mersedeh left Iran for Germany to continue her advocacy for the rights of Iranian women.

== Eye injury ==
=== Incident ===
On October 15, 2022, Mersedeh and her mother joined other protesters on Tehran's Sattar Khan Street, chanting slogans against the Islamic Republic. Around 7:30 p.m., security forces—some on foot and others on motorcycles—moved in to disperse the crowd. An officer fired a paintball gun at her eye. Her mother, who had been shot in the leg a week earlier, was still taking antibiotics and painkillers at the time.

=== Aftermath ===
After the incident, her bloody-faced photo spread rapidly online, prompting significant attention on social media. She subsequently left the country with her 11-year-old daughter.

== Awards ==
In November 2023, she received the National Endowment for Democracy Award. The following month, in December 2023, Mercedeh and Afsoon Najafi jointly won the Sakharov Prize as part of the Woman, Life, Freedom movement. In 2024, the Politiken's Freedom Prize was given to her.

== Personal life ==
Mersedeh Shahinkar is interested in physical fitness and works as a fitness instructor.

== See also ==
- Iranian protests against compulsory hijab
