= Cheshmeh-ye Shirin Shah Ahmad =

Cheshmeh-ye Shirin Shah Ahmad چشمه شيرين شاه احمد
- Village
- Location within Iran
- Coordinates: 32°44′10″N 47°45′39″E
- Country: Iran
- Province: Ilam
- County: Abdanan
- Bakhsh: Kalat
- Rural District: Abanar

Population (2006)
  - Total: 33
- Time zone: UTC+3:30 (IRST)
  - Summer (DST): UTC+4:30 (IRDT)

Cheshmeh-ye Shirin Shah Ahmad (Persian: چشمه شيرين شاه احمد, also Romanized as Cheshmeh-ye Shīrīn Shāh Aḩmad; also known as Cheshmeh-ye Shīrīn) is a village in Abanar Rural District, Kalat District, Abdanan County, Ilam Province, Iran. At the 2006 census, its population was 33, in 4 families. The village is populated by Kurds.
