= Posht Qaleh Abdanan Castle =

Castle in Ilam Province, Iran

Posht Qaleh Abdanan castle
- قلعه پشت قلعه آبدانان

General information
- Type: Castle
- Location: Abdanan County, Iran

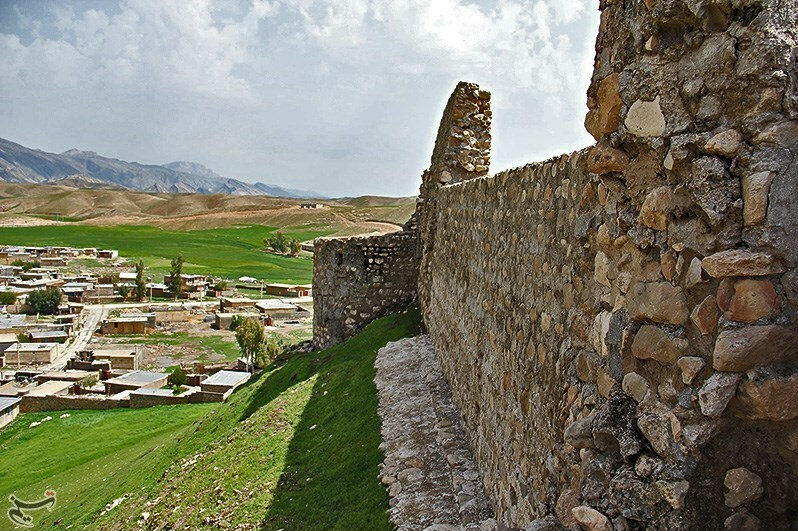
The ruins of Posht Qaleh Abdanan Castle.

Posht Qaleh Abdanan castle (Persian: قلعه پشت قلعه آبدانان) is a historical castle located in Abdanan County in Ilam Province, The longevity of this fortress dates back to the Sasanian Empire.
