= Kol Kol =

Kol Kol (Persian: كل كل) may refer to:

- Kalkal (disambiguation)
- Kol Kol-e Olya (disambiguation)
