= Murmuri =

City in Ilam province, Iran

Murmuri Persian: مورموری
- City
- Location within Iran Location within Ilam Province
- Coordinates: 32°43′33″N 47°40′37″E
- Country: Iran
- Province: Ilam
- County: Abdanan
- District: Kalat

Population (2016)
  - Total: 3,768
- Time zone: UTC+3:30 (IRST)

Murmuri (Persian: مورموری) (Note: Also romanized as Mūrmūrī) is a city in, and the capital of, Kalat District of Abdanan County, Ilam province, Iran. It also serves as the administrative center for Murmuri Rural District.

== Demographics ==
=== Ethnicity ===
The city is populated by Lurs.

=== Population ===
At the time of the 2006 National Census, the city's population was 3,491 in 684 households. The following census in 2011 counted 3,529 people in 868 households. The 2016 census measured the population of the city as 3,768 people in 1,060 households.
