= Kol Kol-e Olya =

Kol Kol-e Olya (Persian: كل كل عليا) may refer to:

- Kol Kol-e Olya, Eyvan
- Kol Kol-e Olya, Shirvan and Chardaval
