= Gol Gol-e Sofla =

Gol Gol-e Sofla or Golgol-e Sofla (Persian: گل گل سفلي) may refer to:

- Gol Gol-e Sofla, Abdanan, Ilam Province
- Gol Gol-e Sofla, Malekshahi, Ilam Province
- Gol Gol-e Sofla, Lorestan
