= Kalkal, Khuzestan =

Kalkal كل كل
- Village
- Location within Iran
- Coordinates: 32°12′09″N 49°48′07″E
- Country: Iran
- Province: Khuzestan
- County: Izeh
- Bakhsh: Central
- Rural District: Pian

Population (2006)
  - Total: 93
- Time zone: UTC+3:30 (IRST)
  - Summer (DST): UTC+4:30 (IRDT)

Kalkal (Persian: كل كل) is a village in Pian Rural District, in the Central District of Izeh County, Khuzestan Province, Iran. At the 2006 census, its population was 93, in 16 families.
