= Cheshmeh-ye Shirin, Kazerun =

Cheshmeh-ye Shirin چشمه شيرين
- Village
- Location within Iran
- Coordinates: 29°28′29″N 51°32′44″E
- Country: Iran
- Province: Fars
- County: Kazerun
- Bakhsh: Jereh and Baladeh
- Rural District: Dadin

Population (2006)
  - Total: 81
- Time zone: UTC+3:30 (IRST)
  - Summer (DST): UTC+4:30 (IRDT)

Cheshmeh-ye Shirin (Persian: چشمه شيرين, also Romanized as Cheshmeh-ye Shīrīn) is a village in Dadin Rural District, Jereh and Baladeh District, Kazerun County, Fars province, Iran. At the 2006 census, its population was 81, in 13 families.
