= Cheshmeh Shirin, Bagh-e Malek =

Cheshmeh Shirin چشمه شيرين
- Village
- Location within Iran
- Coordinates: 31°38′03″N 49°49′06″E
- Country: Iran
- Province: Khuzestan
- County: Bagh-e Malek
- Bakhsh: Central
- Rural District: Qaleh Tall

Population (2006)
  - Total: 404
- Time zone: UTC+3:30 (IRST)
  - Summer (DST): UTC+4:30 (IRDT)

Cheshmeh Shirin (Persian: چشمه شيرين, also Romanized as Cheshmeh Shīrīn, Chashmeh-e Shīrīn, Chashmeh Shīrīn, and Cheshmeh-ye Shīrīn) is a village in Qaleh Tall Rural District, in the Central District of Bagh-e Malek County, Khuzestan Province, Iran. At the 2006 census, its population was 404, in 85 families.
