= Siahuni =

Siahuni سياهوني
- Village
- Location within Iran
- Coordinates: 37°42′51″N 48°41′39″E
- Country: Iran
- Province: Gilan
- County: Talesh
- Bakhsh: Central
- Rural District: Tula Rud

Population (2006)
  - Total: 356
- Time zone: UTC+3:30 (IRST)
  - Summer (DST): UTC+4:30 (IRDT)

Siahuni (Persian: سياهوني, also Romanized as Sīāhūnī; also known as Sīāh Khūnī) is a village in Tula Rud Rural District, Central District, Talesh County, Gilan Province, Iran. At the 2006 census, its population was 356, in 97 families.
