= Cheshmeh Shirin, Arsanjan =

Cheshmeh Shirin چشمه شيرين
- Village
- Location within Iran
- Coordinates: 29°44′18″N 53°08′59″E
- Country: Iran
- Province: Fars
- County: Arsanjan
- Bakhsh: Central
- Rural District: Shurab

Population (2006)
  - Total: 138
- Time zone: UTC+3:30 (IRST)
  - Summer (DST): UTC+4:30 (IRDT)

Cheshmeh Shirin (Persian: چشمه شيرين, also Romanized as Cheshmeh Shīrīn) is a village in Shurab Rural District, in the Central District of Arsanjan County, Fars province, Iran. At the 2006 census, its population was 138, in 33 families.
