= Cheshmeh Shirin, Dezful =

Cheshmeh Shirin چشمه شيرين
- Village
- Location within Iran
- Coordinates: 32°09′54″N 49°08′04″E
- Country: Iran
- Province: Khuzestan
- County: Dezful
- Bakhsh: Sardasht
- Rural District: Seyyedvaliyeddin

Population (2006)
  - Total: 53
- Time zone: UTC+3:30 (IRST)
  - Summer (DST): UTC+4:30 (IRDT)

Cheshmeh Shirin (Persian: چشمه شيرين, also Romanized as Cheshmeh Shīrīn) is a village in Seyyedvaliyeddin Rural District, Sardasht District, Dezful County, Khuzestan Province, Iran. At the 2006 census, its population was 53, in 9 families.
