= Cheshmeh Shirin, Masjed Soleyman =

Cheshmeh Shirin چشمه شيرين
- Village
- Country: Iran
- Province: Khuzestan
- County: Masjed Soleyman
- Bakhsh: Central
- Rural District: Jahangiri

Population (2006)
  - Total: 26
- Time zone: UTC+3:30 (IRST)
  - Summer (DST): UTC+4:30 (IRDT)

Cheshmeh Shirin (Persian: چشمه شيرين, also Romanized as Cheshmeh Shīrīn) is a village in Jahangiri Rural District, in the Central District of Masjed Soleyman County, Khuzestan Province, Iran. At the 2006 census, its population was 26, in 10 families.
