= Abdanan =

City in Ilam province, Iran

Abdanan Persian: آبدانان
- City
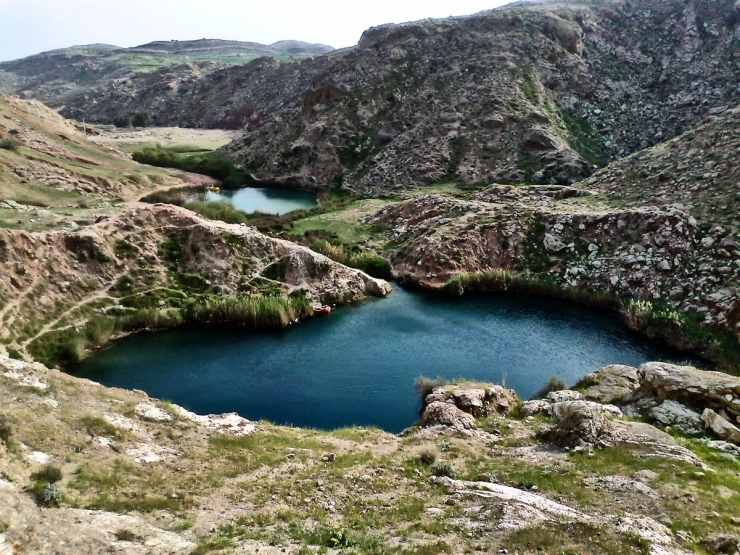
- Landscape near Abdanan

- Location within Iran Location within Ilam Province
- Coordinates: 32°59′32″N 47°25′16″E
- Country: Iran
- Province: Ilam
- County: Abdanan
- District: Central

Population (2016)
  - Total: 23,946
- Time zone: UTC+3:30 (IRST)

Abdanan (Persian: آبدانان) (Note: Also romanized as Ābdānān; also known as Qal‘a Ab-ī-Danan, Qal‘eh-ye Āb Dānān, and Qal‘eh Āb-ī-Dānān; Kurdish: ئاودانان, romanized as Awdanan) is a city in the Central District of Abdanan County, Ilam province, Iran. It serves as capital of both the county and the district.

== Demographics ==
=== Language and ethnicity ===
Clip of nature of Abdanan City, By: Adib Mohamadvali

The city is populated by Kurds with a Luri minority.

Abdanan linguistic composition
language	percent
Kurdish	75%
Luri	20%
Mixed	5%

=== Population ===
At the time of the 2006 National Census, the city's population was 21,662 in 4,618 households. The following census in 2011 counted 22,901 people in 5,536 households. The 2016 census measured the population of the city as 23,946 people in 6,653 households.

== See also ==
- Lake Black Cow
