= Lake Black Cow =

Lake in Iran

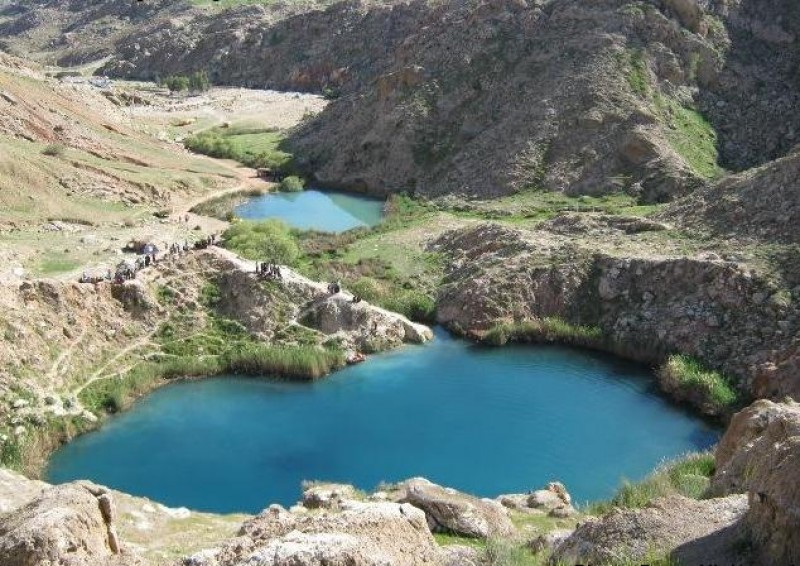
- Interactive map of Lake Black Cow
- Location: Iran
- Coordinates: 47°42′2.88″N 3°52′32″E
- Type: Lake
- Surface area: 3 hectares (7.4 acres)
- Settlements: Abdanan County, Ilam province.

Lake Black Cow (Persian: دریاچه سیاه گاو) is located in Iran, with an area of 3 ha (7.4 acres). The lake is situated in a topographic setting distinguished by the prevalence of elevated plains and mountainous terrain.

Lake Black Cow is divided into two distinct bodies of water due to the presence of a narrow passageway measuring 70 m (230 ft) in length, 8 m (26 ft) in width, and 4 m (13 ft) in depth. This passageway serves as a conduit for the connection between the two lakes.

The initial lake is oval in shape. The depth of this section of the lake is relatively shallow.

The primary factor contributing to the transparency of the lake's water is the substantial absorption of mercury, which has a significant impact on the lake's transparency. The initial lake's clear and fresh water flows into the subsequent one.

== Etymology ==
Additionally, the lake is designated as "Lake Black Waters," a moniker derived from the profound darkness of its water. The lake was designated the "Lake Black Cow" due to its visual resemblance to a cow's horn.
