= Kol Kol-e Olya, Eyvan =

Village in Ilam, Iran

Kol Kol-e Olya كل كل عليا
- Village
- Location within Iran
- Coordinates: 33°47′55″N 46°19′58″E
- Country: Iran
- Province: Ilam
- County: Eyvan
- Bakhsh: Central
- Rural District: Sarab

Population (2006)
  - Total: 142
- Time zone: UTC+3:30 (IRST)
  - Summer (DST): UTC+4:30 (IRDT)

Kol Kol-e Olya (Persian: كل كل عليا, also Romanized as Kol Kol-e ‘Olyā; also known as Kolkol) is a village in Sarab Rural District, in the Central District of Eyvan County, Ilam Province, Iran. At the 2006 census, its population was 142, in 32 families. The village is populated by Kurds.
