= Cheshmeh Shirin, Neyriz =

Cheshmeh Shirin چشمه شيرين
- Village
- Location within Iran
- Coordinates: 29°22′27″N 54°49′49″E
- Country: Iran
- Province: Fars
- County: Neyriz
- Bakhsh: Qatruyeh
- Rural District: Qatruyeh

Population (2006)
  - Total: 70
- Time zone: UTC+3:30 (IRST)
  - Summer (DST): UTC+4:30 (IRDT)

Cheshmeh Shirin (Persian: چشمه شيرين, also Romanized as Cheshmeh Shīrīn, Chashmeh Shīrīn, and Cheshmeh-ye Shīrīn) is a village in Qatruyeh Rural District, Qatruyeh District, Neyriz County, Fars province, Iran. At the 2006 census, its population was 70, in 18 families.
