= Gol Gol-e Olya, Lorestan =

Gol Gol-e Olya گل گل عليا
- Village
- Location within Iran
- Coordinates: 33°12′07″N 47°49′33″E
- Country: Iran
- Province: Lorestan
- County: Pol-e Dokhtar
- Bakhsh: Central
- Rural District: Malavi

Population (2006)
  - Total: 131
- Time zone: UTC+3:30 (IRST)
  - Summer (DST): UTC+4:30 (IRDT)

Gol Gol-e Olya (Persian: گل گل عليا, also Romanized as Gol Gol-e ‘Olyā) is a village in Malavi Rural District, in the Central District of Pol-e Dokhtar County, Lorestan Province, Iran. At the 2006 census, its population was 131, in 31 families.
