= Kol Kol, Kermanshah =

Kol Kol كل كل
- Village
- Location within Iran
- Coordinates: 34°58′51″N 47°31′37″E
- Country: Iran
- Province: Kermanshah
- County: Sonqor
- Bakhsh: Central
- Rural District: Gavrud

Population (2006)
  - Total: 285
- Time zone: UTC+3:30 (IRST)
  - Summer (DST): UTC+4:30 (IRDT)

Kol Kol (Persian: كل كل; also known as Gol Gol and Kulkul) is a village in Gavrud Rural District, in the Central District of Sonqor County, Kermanshah Province, Iran. At the 2006 census, its population was 285, in 57 families.
