= Siah Khani, Gilan =

Siah Khani سياه خانی
- Village
- Location within Iran
- Coordinates: 36°54′53″N 49°53′18″E
- Country: Iran
- Province: Gilan
- County: Siahkal
- Bakhsh: Deylaman
- Rural District: Deylaman

Population (2006)
  - Total: 147
- Time zone: UTC+3:30 (IRST)

Siah Khani (Persian: سياه خانی, also Romanized as Sīāh Khānī and Sīāhkhānī; also known as Sīāh Khūnī and Sīāmkhānī) is a village in Deylaman Rural District, Deylaman District, Siahkal County, Gilan Province, Iran. At the 2016 census, its population was 65, in 22 families. Decreased from 147 people in 2006.
