= Jaberansar Rural District =

Rural district in Ilam province, Iran

Jaberansar Rural District Persian: دهستان جابرانصار
- Rural District
- Location within Iran Location within Ilam Province
- Coordinates: 32°54′04″N 47°26′10″E
- Country: Iran
- Province: Ilam
- County: Abdanan
- District: Central
- Capital: Haft Cheshmeh

Population (2016)
  - Total: 8,585
- Time zone: UTC+3:30 (IRST)

Jaberansar Rural District (Persian: دهستان جابرانصار) is in the Central District of Abdanan County, Ilam province, Iran. Its capital is the village of Haft Cheshmeh.

== Demographics ==
=== Population ===
At the time of the 2006 National Census, the rural district's population was 4,527 in 910 households. There were 4,415 inhabitants in 1,047 households at the following census of 2011. The 2016 census measured the population of the rural district as 8,585 in 2,405 households. The most populous of its 18 villages was Shahrak-e Hezarani, with 2,860 people.
