= Masbi Rural District =

Rural district in Ilam province, Iran

Masbi Rural District Persian: دهستان ماسبي
- Rural District
- Location within Iran Location within Ilam Province
- Coordinates: 33°03′01″N 47°13′27″E
- Country: Iran
- Province: Ilam
- County: Abdanan
- District: Central
- Capital: Anjireh Vatisheh Kand

Population (2016)
  - Total: 2,203
- Time zone: UTC+3:30 (IRST)

Masbi Rural District (Persian: دهستان ماسبي) is in the Central District of Abdanan County, Ilam province, Iran. Its capital is the village of Anjireh Vatisheh Kand.

== Demographics ==
=== Population ===
At the time of the 2006 National Census, the rural district's population was 2,727 in 515 households. There were 2,183 inhabitants in 481 households at the following census of 2011. The 2016 census measured the population of the rural district as 2,203 in 568 households. The most populous of its 10 villages was Gandab, with 1,116 people.
