= Sarabbagh Rural District =

Rural district in Ilam province, Iran

Sarabbagh Rural District Persian: دهستان سراب‌باغ
- Rural District
- Location within Iran Location within Ilam Province
- Coordinates: 32°51′15″N 47°38′15″E
- Country: Iran
- Province: Ilam
- County: Abdanan
- District: Sarabbagh
- Capital: Sarabbagh

Population (2016)
  - Total: 2,611
- Time zone: UTC+3:30 (IRST)

Sarabbagh Rural District (Persian: دهستان سراب‌باغ) is in Sarabbagh District of Abdanan County, Ilam province, Iran. It is administered from the city of Sarabbagh.

== Demographics ==
=== Population ===
At the time of the 2006 National Census, the rural district's population was 4,678 in 922 households. There were 2,547 inhabitants in 589 households at the following census of 2011. The 2016 census measured the population of the rural district as 2,611 in 713 households. The most populous of its 12 villages was Sarpoleh, with 853 people.
