= Vach Kabud Rural District =

Rural district in Ilam province, Iran

Vach Kabud Rural District Persian: دهستان وچ کبود
- Rural District
- Location within Iran Location within Ilam Province
- Coordinates: 32°51′48″N 47°30′11″E
- Country: Iran
- Province: Ilam
- County: Abdanan
- District: Sarabbagh
- Capital: Vachakab

Population (2016)
  - Total: 1,000
- Time zone: UTC+3:30 (IRST)

Vach Kabud Rural District (Persian: دهستان وچ کبود) (Note: Formerly Chamkabud Rural District (دهستان چم‌کبود)) is in Sarabbagh District of Abdanan County, Ilam province, Iran. Its capital is the village of Vachakab. The previous capital of the rural district was the village of Chamkabud. Prior to that time, its capital was the village of Shahrak-e Hezarani.

== Demographics ==
=== Population ===
At the time of the 2006 National Census, the rural district's population (as Chamkabud Rural District) was 5,424 in 1,108 households. There were 5,539 inhabitants in 1,397 households at the following census of 2011. The 2016 census measured the population of the rural district as 1,000 people in 269 households, by which time it was renamed Vach Kabud Rural District. The most populous of its five villages was Vachakab, with 621 people.
