= Murmuri Rural District =

Rural district in Ilam province, Iran

Murmuri Rural District Persian: دهستان مورمورئ
- Rural District
- Location within Iran Location within Ilam Province
- Coordinates: 32°39′24″N 47°45′30″E
- Country: Iran
- Province: Ilam
- County: Abdanan
- District: Kalat
- Capital: Murmuri

Population (2016)
  - Total: 960
- Time zone: UTC+3:30 (IRST)

Murmuri Rural District (Persian: دهستان مورمورئ) is in Kalat of Abdanan County, Ilam province, Iran. It is administered from the city of Murmuri.

== Demographics ==
=== Population ===
At the time of the 2006 National Census, the rural district's population was 1,172 in 221 households. There were 927 inhabitants in 207 households at the following census of 2011. The 2016 census measured the population of the rural district as 960 in 240 households. The most populous of its 24 villages was Largheh, with 166 people.
