= Sarabbagh District =

District in Ilam province, Iran

Sarabbagh District Persian: بخش سراب‌باغ
- District
- Location within Iran Location within Ilam Province
- Coordinates: 32°51′31″N 47°36′46″E
- Country: Iran
- Province: Ilam
- County: Abdanan
- Capital: Sarabbagh

Population (2016)
  - Total: 6,270
- Time zone: UTC+3:30 (IRST)

Sarabbagh District (Persian: بخش سراب‌باغ) is in Abdanan County, Ilam province, Iran. Its capital is the city of Sarabbagh.

== History ==
After the 2006 National Census, the village of Sarabbagh was elevated to the status of a city.

== Demographics ==
=== Population ===
At the time of the 2006 census, the district's population was 10,102 in 2,030 households. The following census in 2011 counted 10,643 people in 2,594 households. The 2016 census measured the population of the district as 6,270 inhabitants in 1,713 households.

=== Administrative divisions ===
Sarabbagh District Population
Administrative Divisions	2006	2011	2016
Sarabbagh RD	4,678	2,547	2,611
Vach Kabud RD (Note: Formerly Chamkabud Rural District)	5,424	5,539	1,000
Sarabbagh (city)		2,557	2,659
Total	10,102	10,643	6,270
RD = Rural District
