= Central District (Abdanan County) =

District in Ilam province, Iran

Central District (Abdanan County) Persian: بخش مرکزی شهرستان آبدانان
- District
- Location within Iran Location within Ilam Province
- Coordinates: 32°58′28″N 47°18′36″E
- Country: Iran
- Province: Ilam
- County: Abdanan
- Capital: Abdanan

Population (2016)
  - Total: 34,734
- Time zone: UTC+3:30 (IRST)

The Central District of Abdanan County (Persian: بخش مرکزی شهرستان آبدانان) is in Ilam province, Iran. Its capital is the city of Abdanan.

== Demographics ==
=== Population ===
At the time of the 2006 National Census, the district's population was 28,916 in 6,043 households. The following census in 2011 counted 29,499 people in 7,064 households. The 2016 census measured the population of the district as 34,734 inhabitants in 9,626 households.

=== Administrative divisions ===
Central District (Abdanan County) Population
Administrative Divisions	2006	2011	2016
Jaberansar RD	4,527	4,415	8,585
Masbi RD	2,727	2,183	2,203
Abdanan (city)	21,662	22,901	23,946
Total	28,916	29,499	34,734
RD = Rural District
