= Abdanan County =

County in Ilam Province, Iran

Abdanan County Persian: شهرستان آبدانان
- County
- Location of Abdanan County in Ilam province (right, yellow)

- Location of Ilam province in Iran
- Coordinates: 32°51′N 47°31′E
- Country: Iran
- Province: Ilam
- Capital: Abdanan
- Districts: Central, Kalat, Sarabbagh

Population (2016)
  - Total: 47,851
- Time zone: UTC+3:30 (IRST)

Abdanan County (Persian: شهرستان آبدانان) (Note: Kurdish: ئاودانان) is in Ilam province, Iran. Its capital is the city of Abdanan. The previous capital of the county was the village of Sarabbagh, (now a city).

== History ==
The region was once part of the Sasanian Empire. During that time the Sasanians built Posht Qaleh Abdanan Castle in what is now Abdanan County. The castle still stands today although it is now in ruins. After the 2006 National Census, the village of Sarabbagh was elevated to the status of a city.

== Demographics ==
=== Ethnicity ===
The county is populated by Kurds and Lurs.

=== Population ===
At the time of the 2006 census, the county's population was 45,830 in 9,358 households. The following census in 2011 counted 46,977 people in 11,256 households. The 2016 census measured the population of the county as 47,851 in 13,188 households.

=== Administrative divisions ===
Abdanan County's population history and administrative structure over three consecutive censuses are shown in the following table.

Abdanan County Population
Administrative Divisions	2006	2011	2016
Central District	28,916	29,499	34,734
Jaberansar RD	4,527	4,415	8,585
Masbi RD	2,727	2,183	2,203
Abdanan (city)	21,662	22,901	23,946
Kalat District	6,812	6,614	6,847
Abanar RD	2,149	2,158	2,119
Murmuri RD	1,172	927	960
Murmuri (city)	3,491	3,529	3,768
Sarabbagh District	10,102	10,643	6,270
Sarabbagh RD	4,678	2,547	2,611
Vach Kabud RD (Note: Formerly Chamkabud Rural District)	5,424	5,539	1,000
Sarabbagh (city)		2,557	2,659
Total	45,830	46,977	47,851
RD = Rural District

== See also ==
- Lake Black Cow

Media related to Abdanan County at Wikimedia Commons
