= Choqa Kabud =

Choqa Kabud or Cheqa Kabud or Chaqa Kabud or Choqakabud (Persian: چقاكبود) may refer to various places in Iran:

- Choqa Kabud, Ilam
- Choqa Kabud, Kermanshah
- Choqa Kabud, Mahidasht, Kermanshah Province
- Cheqa Kabud, Eslamabad-e Gharb, Kermanshah Province
- Choqa Kabud, Harsin, Kermanshah Province
- Choqa Kabud-e Olya, Kermanshah Province
- Choqa Kabud-e Sofla, Kermanshah Province
- Cheqa Kabud-e Naqd Ali, Kermanshah Province
