= Qeshlaq-e Chukhli Quyi =

Qeshlaq-e Chukhli Quyi (Persian: قشلاق چوخلي قوئي) may refer to:

- Qeshlaq-e Chukhli Quyi Bahadruhamat
- Qeshlaq-e Chukhli Quyi Hajj Akbar
- Qeshlaq-e Chukhli Quyi Hajj Hasan Akhteri
- Qeshlaq-e Chukhli Quyi Hajj Hasan Ali
- Qeshlaq-e Chukhli Quyi Hajj Ramazan
- Qeshlaq-e Chukhli Quyi Hoseyn Aq Bashlar
- Qeshlaq-e Chukhli Quyi Khodash
