= Farajollah =

Farajollah is a given name. Notable people with the name include:

- Farajollah Mizani, aka Javanshir, Iranian communist and senior Tudeh Party member
- Farajollah Rasaei (1908–2002), the Commander of the Imperial Iranian Navy from 1961 to 1972
- Farajollah Salahshoor (8206–2016), Iranian film director

== See also ==
- Kur Bolagh-e Farajollah Beygi, a village in Baladarband Rural District, Kermanshah County, Kermanshah Province, Iran
- Qaleh-ye Farajollah Beygs a village in Zalu Ab Rural District, Ravansar County, Kermanshah Province, Iran
- Qeshlaq-e Farajollah Hajj Sarkhan, a village in Qeshlaq-e Gharbi Rural District, Parsabad County, Ardabil Province, Iran
- Qeshlaq-e Farajollah Nemaz, a village in Qeshlaq-e Gharbi Rural District, Parsabad County, Ardabil Province, Iran
- Qeshlaq-e Farajollah Qadir, a village in Qeshlaq-e Gharbi Rural District, Parsabad County, Ardabil Province, Iran
- Zalakeh-ye Farajollah-e Montazeri, a village in Mahidasht Rural District, Kermanshah County, Kermanshah Province, Iran
