= Esmail Kandi =

Esmail Kandi (Persian: اسماعيل كندي) may refer to various places in Iran:

== Ardabil Province ==
- Esmail Kandi, Ardabil
- Esmail Kandi, Germi, Ardabil Province
- Esmail Kandi 1, Parsabad County, Ardabil Province
- Esmail Kandi 2, Parsabad County, Ardabil Province

== West Azerbaijan Province ==
- Esmail Kandi, Chaypareh, a village in Chaypareh County
- Esmail Kandi, Khoy, a village in Khoy County
- Esmail Kandi, Miandoab, a village in Miandoab County
- Esmail Kandi, Baruq, a village in Miandoab County
- Esmail Kandi, Poldasht, a village in Poldasht County
