= Qomsheh =

Qomsheh or Qumisheh or Qowmsheh (Persian: قمشه) may refer to various places in Iran:

- Komeshcheh, city in Isfahan Province
- Shahreza, city in Isfahan Province
- Qomsheh Tappeh, Kermanshah Province
- Qomsheh-ye Baba Karam Khan, Kermanshah Province
- Qomsheh-ye Lor Zanganeh, Kermanshah Province
- Qomsheh-ye Seyyed Amin, Kermanshah Province
- Qomsheh-ye Seyyed Qasem, Kermanshah Province
- Qomsheh-ye Seyyed Yaqub, Kermanshah Province
