= Qeshlaq-e Qabaleh Gah =

Qeshlaq-e Qabaleh Gah (Persian: قشلاق قبله گاه) may refer to:

- Qeshlaq-e Qabaleh Gah Abbas Ali
- Qeshlaq-e Qabaleh Gah Ali Aslan
- Qeshlaq-e Qabaleh Gah Allah Vardi va Paper
- Qeshlaq-e Qabaleh Gah Gol Aslan
