= Choqa Balk =

Choqa Balk or Cheqa Balak or Cheqa Balek or Cheqa Belek (Persian: چقابلك) may refer to one of the following populated places in Iran:

- Choqa Balk-e Alireza
- Choqa Balk-e Khvajeh Bashi
- Choqa Balk-e Kuchek
- Choqa Balk-e Mohammad Zaman

== See also ==
- Balk (disambiguation)
- Cheqa (disambiguation)
