= Kashanbeh =

Kashanbeh (Persian: كاشنبه) may refer to:

- Kashanbeh-ye Chahardangi
- Kashanbeh-ye Lak
- Kashanbeh-ye Sofla
