= Qeshlaq-e Sari Quyi =

Qeshlaq-e Sari Quyi (Persian: قشلاق ساري قوئي) may refer to:

- Qeshlaq-e Sari Quyi Ahmad Khan
- Qeshlaq-e Sari Quyi Mikail
- Qeshlaq-e Sari Quyi Shahmar
