= Qeshlaq-e Farajollah =

Qeshlaq-e Farajollah (Persian: قشلاق فرج اله) may refer to:

- Qeshlaq-e Farajollah Hajj Sarkhan
- Qeshlaq-e Farajollah Nemaz
- Qeshlaq-e Farajollah Qadir
