= Qeshlaq-e Tak Quyi =

Qeshlaq-e Tak Quyi (Persian: قشلاق تك قويي) may refer to:

- Qeshlaq-e Tak Quyi Matlab va Ali Khan
- Qeshlaq-e Tak Quyi Qarah Piran
- Qeshlaq-e Takqui-ye Qarah Piran-e Hazrat-e Qoli
