= Namivand =

Namivand (Persian: ناميوند), also rendered as Namvand, may refer to:

- Namivand-e Olya
- Namivand-e Sofla
- Namivand-e Vasat
