= Balkan (disambiguation) =

The Balkans is a region of southeastern Europe corresponding partially with the Balkan Peninsula.

Balkan may also refer to:

== Places ==
- Balkan Mountains, a mountain range in Serbia and Bulgaria, in the eastern part of the Balkan Peninsula, also called Stara Planina
- Balkan Region, one of the regions of Turkmenistan
- Balkan (village), a village in Stambolovo Municipality, Bulgaria
- Balkan, Kentucky, a community in the US

== People ==
- Balkan (name)

== The arts ==
- Balkan (band), a defunct hard-rock band from former Yugoslavia
- Balkans (band), a rock band from Atlanta, Georgia, US
- Balkan (album), an album by Seka Aleksić
- "Balkan", a song by Scale the Summit from the album The Collective

== Organizations ==
- Balkan Bulgarian Airlines (1947–2002), a defunct Bulgarian government-owned airline
- Balkan Universities Network, a regional university association
- FBK Balkan, a Swedish football club
- FC Balkan, a Turkmen football club
- FK Balkan Skopje, a Macedonian football club
- PFC Balkan Botevgrad, a Bulgarian football club

== Other uses ==
- Balkan (ship) ship of the compagnie Fraissinet, sunk August 1918
- Balkan (newspaper), a newspaper published in Balkanabat, Turkmenistan
- Balkan (motorcycle), the first motorcycle built in Bulgaria
- Balkan sprachbund, a linguistic concept
- Balkanization, a geopolitical term

== See also ==
- Balka (disambiguation)
- FK Balkan (disambiguation)
- Bolkan (disambiguation)
