= Kangarban =

Kangarban (Persian: كنگربان), also rendered as Kankarban, may refer to:

- Kangarban-e Olya
- Kangarban-e Sofla
- Kangarban-e Vosta
