= Mahidasht =

Mahidasht (Persian: ماهيدشت) may refer to:

- Mahidashti Plains, Region in Kermanshah, Iran
- Mahidasht District, an administrative subdivision of Iran
- Mahidasht Rural District, an administrative subdivision of Iran
- Mahidasht, a city in Iran
