= Qarah Takanlu =

Village in Ardabil province, Iran

Qarah Takanlu Persian: قره تكانلو
- Village
- Location within Iran
- Country: Iran
- Province: Ardabil
- County: Aslan Duz
- District: Borran
- Rural District: Borran

Population (2016)
  - Total: 308
- Time zone: UTC+3:30 (IRST)

Qarah Takanlu (Persian: قره تكانلو) (Note: Also romanized as Qarah Takānlū) is a village in Borran Rural District of Borran District in Aslan Duz County, Ardabil province, Iran.

== Demographics ==
=== Population ===
At the time of the 2006 National Census, the village's population was 206 in 39 households, when it was in Qeshlaq-e Gharbi Rural District of the former Aslan Duz District in Parsabad County. The following census in 2011 counted 192 people in 45 households. The 2016 census measured the population of the village as 308 people in 90 households.

In 2019, the district was separated from the county in the establishment of Aslan Duz County, and the rural district was transferred to the new Borran District. Qarah Takanlu was transferred to Borran Rural District created in the district.
