= Chahar Zabar =

Chahar Zabar or Chehar Zabar (Persian: چهارزبر) may refer to:

- Chahar Zabar-e Olya
- Chahar Zabar-e Sofla
