= Qeshlaq-e Jalilu =

Village in Ardabil province, Iran

Qeshlaq-e Jalilu Persian: قشلاق جليلو
- Village
- Location within Iran
- Coordinates: 39°21′38″N 47°35′14″E
- Country: Iran
- Province: Ardabil
- County: Aslan Duz
- District: Borran
- Rural District: Borran

Population (2016)
  - Total: 673
- Time zone: UTC+3:30 (IRST)

Qeshlaq-e Jalilu (Persian: قشلاق جليلو) (Note: Also romanized as Qeshlāq-e Jalīlū) is a village in Borran Rural District of Borran District in Aslan Duz County, Ardabil province, Iran.

== Demographics ==
=== Population ===
At the time of the 2006 National Census, the village's population was 378 in 64 households, when it was in Qeshlaq-e Gharbi Rural District of the former Aslan Duz District in Parsabad County. The following census in 2011 counted 55 people in 14 households. The 2016 census measured the population of the village as 673 people in 191 households.

In 2019, the district was separated from the county in the establishment of Aslan Duz County, and the rural district was transferred to the new Borran District. Qeshlaq-e Jalilu was transferred to Borran Rural District created in the district.
