= Qeshlaq-e Tulkilu =

Qeshlaq-e Tulkilu (Persian: قشلاق تولكيلو) may refer to:

- Qeshlaq-e Tulkilu Gol Moradi
- Qeshlaq-e Tulkilu Gujehlar
