= Qeshlaq-e Ayaq Ayiri Hajj Mohammad Ali =

Village in Ardabil province, Iran

Qeshlaq-e Ayaq Ayiri Hajj Mohammad Ali Persian: قشلاق اياق ايري حاج محمدعلي
- Village
- Location within Iran
- Coordinates: 39°24′15″N 47°36′06″E
- Country: Iran
- Province: Ardabil
- County: Aslan Duz
- District: Borran
- Rural District: Borran

Population (2016)
  - Total: 41
- Time zone: UTC+3:30 (IRST)

Qeshlaq-e Ayaq Ayiri Hajj Mohammad Ali (Persian: قشلاق اياق ايري حاج محمدعلي) (Note: Also romanized as Qeshlāq-e Āyāq Āyīrī Ḩājj Moḩammad ʿAlī) is a village in Borran Rural District of Borran District in Aslan Duz County, Ardabil province, Iran.

== Demographics ==
=== Population ===
At the time of the 2006 National Census, the village's population was 55 in nine households, when it was in Qeshlaq-e Gharbi Rural District of the former Aslan Duz District in Parsabad County. The following census in 2011 counted 53 people in 16 households. The 2016 census measured the population of the village as 41 people in 11 households.

In 2019, the district was separated from the county in the establishment of Aslan Duz County, and the rural district was transferred to the new Borran District. Qeshlaq-e Ayaq Ayiri Hajj Mohammad Ali was transferred to Borran Rural District created in the district.
