= Alamlu =

Alamlu (Persian: الم لو) may refer to:

- Alamlu Shah Ali
- Alamlu Tabriz
