= Qeshlaq-e Hajj Taleb =

Village in Ardabil province, Iran

Qeshlaq-e Hajj Taleb Persian: قشلاق حاج طالب
- Village
- Location within Iran
- Coordinates: 39°24′39″N 47°34′18″E
- Country: Iran
- Province: Ardabil
- County: Aslan Duz
- District: Borran
- Rural District: Borran

Population (2016)
  - Total: 169
- Time zone: UTC+3:30 (IRST)

Qeshlaq-e Hajj Taleb (Persian: قشلاق حاج طالب) (Note: Also romanized as Qeshlāq-e Ḩājj Ţāleb) is a village in Borran Rural District of Borran District in Aslan Duz County, Ardabil province, Iran.

== Demographics ==
=== Population ===
At the time of the 2006 National Census, the village's population was 118 in 29 households, when it was in Qeshlaq-e Gharbi Rural District of the former Aslan Duz District in Parsabad County. The following census in 2011 counted 135 people in 37 households. The 2016 census measured the population of the village as 169 people in 48 households.

In 2019, the district was separated from the county in the establishment of Aslan Duz County, and the rural district was transferred to the new Borran District. Qeshlaq-e Hajj Taleb was transferred to Borran Rural District created in the district.
