= Qeshlaq-e Kazem Owghlan =

Village in Ardabil province, Iran

Qeshlaq-e Kazem Owghlan Persian: قشلاق كاظم اوغلان
- Village
- Location within Iran
- Coordinates: 39°22′48″N 47°40′42″E
- Country: Iran
- Province: Ardabil
- County: Aslan Duz
- District: Borran
- Rural District: Borran

Population (2016)
  - Total: 60
- Time zone: UTC+3:30 (IRST)

Qeshlaq-e Kazem Owghlan (Persian: قشلاق كاظم اوغلان) (Note: Also romanized as Qeshlāq-e Kāẓem Owghlān) is a village in Borran Rural District of Borran District in Aslan Duz County, Ardabil province, Iran.

== Demographics ==
=== Population ===
At the time of the 2006 National Census, the village's population was 73 in 15 households, when it was in Qeshlaq-e Gharbi Rural District of the former Aslan Duz District in Parsabad County. The following census in 2011 counted 72 people in 19 households. The 2016 census measured the population of the village as 60 people in 20 households.

In 2019, the district was separated from the county in the establishment of Aslan Duz County, and the rural district was transferred to the new Borran District. Qeshlaq-e Kazem Owghlan was transferred to Borran Rural District created in the district.
