= Qeshlaq-e Hajji Balakhan =

Village in Ardabil province, Iran

Qeshlaq-e Hajji Balakhan Persian: قشلاق حاجي بالاخان
- Village
- Country: Iran
- Province: Ardabil
- County: Aslan Duz
- District: Borran
- Rural District: Borran

Population (2016)
  - Total: 20
- Time zone: UTC+3:30 (IRST)

Qeshlaq-e Hajji Balakhan (Persian: قشلاق حاجي بالاخان) (Note: Also romanized as Qeshlāq-e Ḩājjī Bālākhān) is a village in Borran Rural District of Borran District in Aslan Duz County, Ardabil province, Iran.

== Demographics ==
=== Population ===
At the time of the 2006 National Census, the village's population was 46 in 10 households, when it was in Qeshlaq-e Gharbi Rural District of the former Aslan Duz District in Parsabad County. The following census in 2011 counted 55 people in 12 households. The 2016 census measured the population of the village as 20 people in seven households.

In 2019, the district was separated from the county in the establishment of Aslan Duz County, and the rural district was transferred to the new Borran District. Qeshlaq-e Hajji Balakhan was transferred to Borran Rural District created in the district.
