= Khazl, Iran =

Village in Kermanshah, Iran

Khazl خزل
- Village
- Location within Iran
- Coordinates: 34°12′54″N 46°50′45″E
- Country: Iran
- Province: Kermanshah
- County: Kermanshah
- Bakhsh: Mahidasht
- Rural District: Mahidasht

Population (2006)
  - Total: 102
- Time zone: UTC+3:30 (IRST)
  - Summer (DST): UTC+4:30 (IRDT)

Khazl (Persian: خزل; also known as Khaz'el) is a village in Mahidasht Rural District, Mahidasht District, Kermanshah County, Kermanshah Province, Iran. At the 2006 census, its population was 102, in 25 families.
