= Chaqa Bahar =

Chaqa Bahar چقابهار
- Village
- Location within Iran
- Coordinates: 34°17′01″N 46°44′11″E
- Country: Iran
- Province: Kermanshah
- County: Kermanshah
- Bakhsh: Mahidasht
- Rural District: Chaqa Narges

Population (2006)
  - Total: 175
- Time zone: UTC+3:30 (IRST)
  - Summer (DST): UTC+4:30 (IRDT)

Chaqa Bahar (Persian: چقابهار, also Romanized as Chaqā Bahār and Choqā Bahār) is a village in Chaqa Narges Rural District, Mahidasht District, Kermanshah County, Kermanshah Province, Iran. At the 2006 census, its population was 175, in 43 families.
