= Belmaneh =

Belmaneh (Persian: بلمانه) may refer to:

- Belmaneh-ye Olya
- Belmaneh-ye Sofla
