= Patiabad =

Patiabad (Persian: پتي اباد) may refer to:

- Patiabad, Kermanshah
- Patiabad, Mahidasht, Kermanshah Province
