= Seh Tappeh =

Village in Kermanshah, Iran

Seh Tappeh سه تپه
- Village
- Location within Iran
- Coordinates: 34°26′03″N 46°42′27″E
- Country: Iran
- Province: Kermanshah
- County: Kermanshah
- Bakhsh: Mahidasht
- Rural District: Chaqa Narges

Population (2006)
  - Total: 126
- Time zone: UTC+3:30 (IRST)
  - Summer (DST): UTC+4:30 (IRDT)

Seh Tappeh (Persian: سه تپه) is a village in Chaqa Narges Rural District, Mahidasht District, Kermanshah County, Kermanshah Province, Iran. At the 2006 census, its population was 126, in 25 families.
