= Qeshlaq-e Sumuklu =

Qeshlaq-e Sumuklu (Persian: قشلاق سوموكلو) may refer to:

- Qeshlaq-e Sumuklu Heydar
- Qeshlaq-e Sumuklu Jalil
- Qeshlaq-e Sumuklu Mayir
