= Qeshlaq-e Farajollah Hasan =

Village in Ardabil province, Iran

Qeshlaq-e Farajollah Hasan Persian: قشلاق فرج اله حسن
- Village
- Location within Iran
- Coordinates: 39°22′59″N 47°36′08″E
- Country: Iran
- Province: Ardabil
- County: Aslan Duz
- District: Borran
- Rural District: Borran

Population (2016)
  - Total: 49
- Time zone: UTC+3:30 (IRST)

Qeshlaq-e Farajollah Hasan (Persian: قشلاق فرج اله حسن) is a village in Borran Rural District of Borran District in Aslan Duz County, Ardabil province, Iran.

== Demographics ==
=== Population ===
The village did not appear in the 2006 National Census. The following census in 2011 counted 37 people in 11 households, when it was in Qeshlaq-e Gharbi Rural District of the former Aslan Duz District in Parsabad County. The 2016 census measured the population of the village as 48 people in 12 households.

In 2019, the district was separated from the county in the establishment of Aslan Duz County, and the rural district was transferred to the new Borran District. Qeshlaq-e Farajollah Hasan was transferred to Borran Rural District created in the district.
