= Qeshlaq-e Iman Quyi =

Qeshlaq-e Iman Quyi (Persian: قشلاق ايمان قويي) may refer to:

- Qeshlaq-e Iman Quyi Mohammad Jalili
- Qeshlaq-e Iman Quyi Mashhad Ali
