= Balk (surname) =

Balk is a surname. Notable people with this surname include:

== Entertainment ==
- Fairuza Balk (born 1974), American film actress
- Harry Balk (1925–2016), American record producer and executive
- Michael Balk, Australian actor, television presenter, radio announcer, and producer
- Wesley Balk (1932–2003), American performance theorist/coach and stage director

== Sports ==
- Harold Balk (c. 1898–1970), New Zealand footballer
- Jordi Balk (born 1994), Dutch footballer
- Klaas Balk (born 1948), Dutch cyclist
- Lars Balk (born 1996), Dutch field hockey player
- Remco Balk (born 2001), Dutch footballer
- Wulfe Balk (born 1955), Canadian fencer

== Other ==
- Alfred Balk (1930–2010), American reporter, nonfiction author and magazine editor
- Christianne Balk (born 1953), American poet
- Daniel Georg Balk (1764–1826), German medical researcher
- Hermann Balk, 13th century Master of the Teutonic and Livonian Orders
- Josh Balk (born 1979), American activist
- Margarete Balk (1896–1974), German teacher and politician
- Matryona Balk (fl. 1718), Russian courtier
- Nicole Uhre-Balk, American educator and politician

== See also ==
- Balk (disambiguation)
