= Qeshlaq-e Muzuhlar =

Village in Ardabil province, Iran

Qeshlaq-e Muzuhlar Persian: قشلاق موزوهلر
- Village
- Location within Iran
- Coordinates: 39°23′09″N 47°34′16″E
- Country: Iran
- Province: Ardabil
- County: Aslan Duz
- District: Borran
- Rural District: Borran

Population (2016)
  - Total: 51
- Time zone: UTC+3:30 (IRST)

Qeshlaq-e Muzuhlar (Persian: قشلاق موزوهلر) (Note: Also romanized as Qeshlāq-e Mūzūhlar) is a village in Borran Rural District of Borran District in Aslan Duz County, Ardabil province, Iran.

== Demographics ==
=== Population ===
At the time of the 2006 National Census, the village's population was 58 in 15 households, when it was in Qeshlaq-e Gharbi Rural District of the former Aslan Duz District in Parsabad County. The following census in 2011 counted 113 people in 28 households. The 2016 census measured the population of the village as 51 people in 14 households.

In 2019, the district was separated from the county in the establishment of Aslan Duz County, and the rural district was transferred to the new Borran District. Qeshlaq-e Muzuhlar was transferred to Borran Rural District created in the district.
