= Qeshlaq-e Kazem Owghlan Asghar =

Village in Ardabil province, Iran

Qeshlaq-e Kazem Owghlan Asghar Persian: قشلاق كاظم اوغلان اصغر
- Village
- Location within Iran
- Coordinates: 39°23′34″N 47°40′43″E
- Country: Iran
- Province: Ardabil
- County: Aslan Duz
- District: Borran
- Rural District: Borran

Population (2016)
  - Total: 49
- Time zone: UTC+3:30 (IRST)

Qeshlaq-e Kazem Owghlan Asghar (Persian: قشلاق كاظم اوغلان اصغر) (Note: Also romanized as Qeshlāq-e Kāẓem Owghlān Āṣghar) is a village in Borran Rural District of Borran District in Aslan Duz County, Ardabil province, Iran.

== Demographics ==
=== Population ===
At the time of the 2006 National Census, the village's population was 29 in seven households, when it was in Qeshlaq-e Gharbi Rural District of the former Aslan Duz District in Parsabad County. The following census in 2011 counted 42 people in 10 households. The 2016 census measured the population of the village as 49 people in 18 households.

In 2019, the district was separated from the county in the establishment of Aslan Duz County, and the rural district was transferred to the new Borran District. Qeshlaq-e Kazem Owghlan Asghar was transferred to Borran Rural District created in the district.
