= Qeshlaq-e Tarrehchi =

Village in Ardabil province, Iran

Qeshlaq-e Tarrehchi Persian: قشلاق تره چي
- Village
- Location within Iran
- Coordinates: 39°21′09″N 47°36′22″E
- Country: Iran
- Province: Ardabil
- County: Aslan Duz
- District: Borran
- Rural District: Borran

Population (2016)
  - Total: 143
- Time zone: UTC+3:30 (IRST)

Qeshlaq-e Tarrehchi (Persian: قشلاق تره چي) (Note: Also romanized as Qeshlāq-e Tarrehchī) is a village in Borran Rural District of Borran District in Aslan Duz County, Ardabil province, Iran.

== Demographics ==
=== Population ===
At the time of the 2006 National Census, the village's population was 146 in 31 households, when it was in Qeshlaq-e Gharbi Rural District of the former Aslan Duz District in Parsabad County. The following census in 2011 counted 106 people in 26 households. The 2016 census measured the population of the village as 143 people in 39 households.

In 2019, the district was separated from the county in the establishment of Aslan Duz County, and the rural district was transferred to the new Borran District. Qeshlaq-e Tarrehchi was transferred to Borran Rural District created in the district.
