= Meymaz =

Village in Kermanshah, Iran

Meymaz ميمز
- Village
- Location within Iran
- Coordinates: 34°15′14″N 46°45′57″E
- Country: Iran
- Province: Kermanshah
- County: Kermanshah
- Bakhsh: Mahidasht
- Rural District: Mahidasht

Population (2006)
  - Total: 146
- Time zone: UTC+3:30 (IRST)
  - Summer (DST): UTC+4:30 (IRDT)

Meymaz (Persian: ميمز) is a village in Mahidasht Rural District, Mahidasht District, Kermanshah County, Kermanshah Province, Iran. At the 2006 census, its population was 146, in 31 families.
