= Qeshlaq-e Hajji Panjalu =

Village in Ardabil province, Iran

Qeshlaq-e Hajji Panjalu Persian: قشلاق حاجي پنجالو
- Village
- Location within Iran
- Coordinates: 39°21′25″N 47°33′36″E
- Country: Iran
- Province: Ardabil
- County: Aslan Duz
- District: Borran
- Rural District: Borran

Population (2016)
  - Total: 167
- Time zone: UTC+3:30 (IRST)

Qeshlaq-e Hajji Panjalu (Persian: قشلاق حاجي پنجالو) (Note: Also romanized as Qeshlāq-e Ḩājjī Panjālū) is a village in Borran Rural District of Borran District in Aslan Duz County, Ardabil province, Iran.

== Demographics ==
=== Population ===
At the time of the 2006 National Census, the village's population was 184 in seven households, when it was in Qeshlaq-e Gharbi Rural District of the former Aslan Duz District in Parsabad County. The following census in 2011 counted 167 people in 44 households. The 2016 census measured the population of the village as 167 people in 49 households.

In 2019, the district was separated from the county in the establishment of Aslan Duz County, and the rural district was transferred to the new Borran District. Qeshlaq-e Hajji Panjalu was transferred to Borran Rural District created in the district.
