= Qusha Qeshlaq-e Hasan =

Village in Ardabil province, Iran

Qusha Qeshlaq-e Hasan Persian: قوشاقشلاق حسن
- Village
- Location within Iran
- Coordinates: 39°21′33″N 47°42′42″E
- Country: Iran
- Province: Ardabil
- County: Aslan Duz
- District: Borran
- Rural District: Borran

Population (2016)
  - Total: 39
- Time zone: UTC+3:30 (IRST)

Qusha Qeshlaq-e Hasan (Persian: قوشاقشلاق حسن) (Note: Also romanized as Qūshā Qeshlāq-e Ḩasan) is a village in Borran Rural District of Borran District in Aslan Duz County, Ardabil province, Iran.

== Demographics ==
=== Population ===
At the time of the 2006 National Census, the village's population was 31 in seven households, when it was in Qeshlaq-e Gharbi Rural District of the former Aslan Duz District in Parsabad County. The following census in 2011 counted 37 people in 10 households. The 2016 census measured the population of the village as 39 people in 12 households.

In 2019, the district was separated from the county in the establishment of Aslan Duz County, and the rural district was transferred to the new Borran District. Qusha Qeshlaq-e Hasan was transferred to Borran Rural District created in the district.
