= Band-e Balut =

Band-e Balut بندبلوط
- Village
- Location within Iran
- Coordinates: 34°17′09″N 46°40′13″E
- Country: Iran
- Province: Kermanshah
- County: Kermanshah
- Bakhsh: Mahidasht
- Rural District: Chaqa Narges

Population (2006)
  - Total: 82
- Time zone: UTC+3:30 (IRST)
  - Summer (DST): UTC+4:30 (IRDT)

Band-e Balut (Persian: بندبلوط, also Romanized as Band-e Balūţ) is a village in Chaqa Narges Rural District, Mahidasht District, Kermanshah County, Kermanshah Province, Iran. At the 2006 census, its population was 82, in 15 families.
