= Ban Ganjab =

Ban Ganjab بان گنجاب
- Village
- Location within Iran
- Coordinates: 34°17′59″N 46°41′04″E
- Country: Iran
- Province: Kermanshah
- County: Kermanshah
- Bakhsh: Mahidasht
- Rural District: Chaqa Narges

Population (2006)
  - Total: 290
- Time zone: UTC+3:30 (IRST)
  - Summer (DST): UTC+4:30 (IRDT)

Ban Ganjab (Persian: بان گنجاب, also Romanized as Bān Ganjāb; also known as Bānganjāō, Bānkanjāb, and Ganjāb) is a village in Chaqa Narges Rural District, Mahidasht District, Kermanshah County, Kermanshah Province, Iran. At the 2006 census, its population was 290, in 62 families.
