= Balk (disambiguation) =

A balk is an illegal motion by a baseball pitcher.

It may also refer to:

== People ==
- Balk (surname), includes a list of notable people with this surname

== Places ==
- Balk, Netherlands, a town in the northern Netherlands
- Balk, North Yorkshire, a hamlet and civil parish in England
- Choqa Balk, several populated places in Iran

== Other uses ==
- Balk and baulk, areas on various types of billiard table
  - Balkline, a group of carom billiards games
- Balk, a wall of intact earth in an archaeological excavation

== See also ==
- Balck, a surname
- Balka (disambiguation)
- Balkan (disambiguation)
- Balke (disambiguation)
- Balkh, an ancient city in what is now northern Afghanistan
- Balkh Province, a province in northern Afghanistan
- Balki (disambiguation)
