= Molla Zaman =

Molla Zaman ملازمان
- Village
- Location within Iran
- Coordinates: 34°17′12″N 46°42′56″E
- Country: Iran
- Province: Kermanshah
- County: Kermanshah
- Bakhsh: Mahidasht
- Rural District: Chaqa Narges

Population (2006)
  - Total: 199
- Time zone: UTC+3:30 (IRST)
  - Summer (DST): UTC+4:30 (IRDT)

Molla Zaman (Persian: ملازمان, also Romanized as Mollā Zamān; also known as Mulla Zamān) is a village in Chaqa Narges Rural District, Mahidasht District, Kermanshah County, Kermanshah Province, Iran. At the 2006 census, its population was 199, in 46 families.
