= Qeshlaq-e Qarah Takanlu Amrollah =

Village in Ardabil province, Iran

Qeshlaq-e Qarah Takanlu Amrollah Persian: قشلاق قره تكانلوامراله
- Village
- Location within Iran
- Coordinates: 39°21′49″N 47°28′38″E
- Country: Iran
- Province: Ardabil
- County: Aslan Duz
- District: Borran
- Rural District: Borran

Population (2016)
  - Total: Below reporting threshold
- Time zone: UTC+3:30 (IRST)

Qeshlaq-e Qarah Takanlu Amrollah (Persian: قشلاق قره تكانلوامراله) (Note: Also romanized as Qeshlāq-e Qarah Takānlū Amrollah) is a village in Borran Rural District of Borran District in Aslan Duz County, Ardabil province, Iran.

== Demographics ==
=== Population ===
At the time of the 2006 National Census, the village's population was 187 in 32 households, when it was in Qeshlaq-e Gharbi Rural District of the former Aslan Duz District in Parsabad County. The following census in 2011 counted 55 people in 14 households. The 2016 census measured the population of the village as below the reporting threshold.

In 2019, the district was separated from the county in the establishment of Aslan Duz County, and the rural district was transferred to the new Borran District. Qeshlaq-e Qarah Takanlu Amrollah was transferred to Borran Rural District created in the district.
