= Samereh =

Samereh (Persian: سامره) may refer to:

- Samereh-ye Olya
- Samereh-ye Sofla
