= Gowzalli =

Gowzalli or Gowzli (Persian: گوزلي) may refer to:

- Gowzalli, Ardabil
- Gowzalli, West Azerbaijan
