= Qeshlaq-e Hajji Gholam =

Village in Ardabil province, Iran

Qeshlaq-e Hajji Gholam Persian: قشلاق حاجي غلام
- Village
- Country: Iran
- Province: Ardabil
- County: Aslan Duz
- District: Borran
- Rural District: Borran

Population (2016)
  - Total: 125
- Time zone: UTC+3:30 (IRST)

Qeshlaq-e Hajji Gholam (Persian: قشلاق حاجي غلام) (Note: Also romanized as Qeshlāq-e Ḩājjī Gholām) is a village in Borran Rural District of Borran District in Aslan Duz County, Ardabil province, Iran.

== Demographics ==
=== Population ===
At the time of the 2006 National Census, the village's population was 89 in 20 households, when it was in Qeshlaq-e Gharbi Rural District of the former Aslan Duz District in Parsabad County. The following census in 2011 counted 109 people in 27 households. The 2016 census measured the population of the village as 125 people in 38 households.

In 2019, the district was separated from the county in the establishment of Aslan Duz County, and the rural district was transferred to the new Borran District. Qeshlaq-e Hajji Gholam was transferred to Borran Rural District created in the district.
