= Borran-e Sofla =

Village in Ardabil province, Iran

Borran-e Sofla Persian: بران سفلی
- Village
- Location within Iran
- Coordinates: 39°20′08″N 47°30′07″E
- Country: Iran
- Province: Ardabil
- County: Aslan Duz
- District: Borran
- Rural District: Borran

Population (2016)
  - Total: 617
- Time zone: UTC+3:30 (IRST)

Borran-e Sofla (Persian: بران سفلی) (Note: Also romanized as Borrān-e Soflá; also known as Borrān-e Pā'īn) is a village in, and the capital of, Borran Rural District in Borran District of Aslan Duz County, Ardabil province, Iran.

== Demographics ==
=== Population ===
At the time of the 2006 National Census, the village's population was 649 in 121 households, when it was in Qeshlaq-e Gharbi Rural District of the former Aslan Duz District in Parsabad County. The following census in 2011 counted 560 people in 144 households. The 2016 census measured the population of the village as 617 people in 194 households.

In 2019, the district was separated from the county in the establishment of Aslan Duz County, and the rural district was transferred to the new Borran District. Borran-e Sofla was transferred to Borran Rural District created in the district.
