= Dowkushkan =

Dowkushkan (Persian: دوكوشكان), also rendered as Dokushkan, may refer to:

- Dowkushkan-e Hoseynkhani
- Dowkushkan-e Reza Khani
