= Qeshlaq-e Ayiri Darreh Hajj Mahbat =

Village in Ardabil province, Iran

Qeshlaq-e Ayiri Darreh Hajj Mahbat Persian: قشلاق ايري دره حاج محبت
- Village
- Location within Iran
- Coordinates: 39°23′05″N 47°32′49″E
- Country: Iran
- Province: Ardabil
- County: Aslan Duz
- District: Borran
- Rural District: Borran

Population (2016)
  - Total: 97
- Time zone: UTC+3:30 (IRST)

Qeshlaq-e Ayiri Darreh Hajj Mahbat (Persian: قشلاق ايري دره حاج محبت) (Note: Also romanized as Qeshlāq-e Āyīrī Darreh Ḩājj Maḥbat) is a village in Borran Rural District of Borran District in Aslan Duz County, Ardabil province, Iran.

== Demographics ==
=== Population ===
At the time of the 2006 National Census, the village's population was 84 in 18 households, when it was in Qeshlaq-e Gharbi Rural District of the former Aslan Duz District in Parsabad County. The following census in 2011 counted 96 people in 25 households. The 2016 census measured the population of the village as 97 people in 27 households.

In 2019, the district was separated from the county in the establishment of Aslan Duz County, and the rural district was transferred to the new Borran District. Qeshlaq-e Ayiri Darreh Hajj Mahbat was transferred to Borran Rural District created in the district.
