= Qeshlaq-e Tulkilu Gol Moradi =

Village in Ardabil province, Iran

Qeshlaq-e Tulkilu Gol Moradi Persian: قشلاق تولكيلوگلمرادئ
- Village
- Location within Iran
- Coordinates: 39°20′00″N 47°35′32″E
- Country: Iran
- Province: Ardabil
- County: Aslan Duz
- District: Borran
- Rural District: Borran

Population (2016)
  - Total: 25
- Time zone: UTC+3:30 (IRST)

Qeshlaq-e Tulkilu Gol Moradi (Persian: قشلاق تولكيلوگلمرادئ) (Note: Also romanized as Qeshlāq-e Tūlkīlū Gol Morādi) is a village in Borran Rural District of Borran District in Aslan Duz County, Ardabil province, Iran.

== Demographics ==
=== Population ===
At the time of the 2006 National Census, the village's population was 40 in eight households, when it was in Qeshlaq-e Gharbi Rural District of the former Aslan Duz District in Parsabad County. The following census in 2011 counted 23 people in seven households. The 2016 census measured the population of the village as 25 people in seven households.

In 2019, the district was separated from the county in the establishment of Aslan Duz County, and the rural district was transferred to the new Borran District. Qeshlaq-e Tulkilu Gol Moradi was transferred to Borran Rural District created in the district.
