= Valck =

Valck is a surname. Notable people with the surname include:

- Gerard Valck (1652–1726), Dutch engraver
- Pieter de Valck (1584–1625), Dutch painter

== See also ==
- Balck
- Valcke
