= Kangarban-e Olya =

Kangarban-e Olya كنگربان عليا
- Village
- Location within Iran
- Coordinates: 34°21′59″N 46°46′07″E
- Country: Iran
- Province: Kermanshah
- County: Kermanshah
- Bakhsh: Mahidasht
- Rural District: Chaqa Narges

Population (2006)
  - Total: 160
- Time zone: UTC+3:30 (IRST)
  - Summer (DST): UTC+4:30 (IRDT)

Kangarban-e Olya (Persian: كنگربان عليا, also Romanized as Kangarbān-e ‘Olyá; also known as Kangarbān, Kangarbān-e Bālā, and Kankarbān-e Bālā) is a village in Chaqa Narges Rural District, Mahidasht District, Kermanshah County, Kermanshah Province, Iran. At the 2006 census, its population was 160, in 43 families.
