= Namivand-e Olya =

Namivand-e Olya ناميوندعليا
- Village
- Location within Iran
- Coordinates: 34°24′10″N 46°44′18″E
- Country: Iran
- Province: Kermanshah
- County: Kermanshah
- Bakhsh: Mahidasht
- Rural District: Chaqa Narges

Population (2006)
  - Total: 322
- Time zone: UTC+3:30 (IRST)
  - Summer (DST): UTC+4:30 (IRDT)

Namivand-e Olya (Persian: ناميوندعليا, also Romanized as Nāmīvand-e ‘Olyā; also known as Nāmīvand Qal‘eh and Nāmvand-e Qal‘eh) is a village in Chaqa Narges Rural District, Mahidasht District, Kermanshah County, Kermanshah Province, Iran. At the 2006 census, its population was 322, in 72 families.
