= Choqa Balk-e Mohammad Zaman =

Choqa Balk-e Mohammad Zaman چقابلك محمدزمان
- Village
- Location within Iran
- Coordinates: 34°19′27″N 46°48′19″E
- Country: Iran
- Province: Kermanshah
- County: Kermanshah
- Bakhsh: Mahidasht
- Rural District: Mahidasht

Population (2006)
  - Total: 117
- Time zone: UTC+3:30 (IRST)
  - Summer (DST): UTC+4:30 (IRDT)

Choqa Balk-e Mohammad Zaman (Persian: چقابلك محمدزمان, also Romanized as Choqā Balk-e Moḩammad Zamān, Cheqā Balak-e Moḩammad Zamān, and Cheqā Balak Moḩammad Zamān, Cheqā Balak-e Moḩammad Zamān Khān, Cheqā Balak Moḩammad Zamān Khān, Cheqā Balek-e Moḩammad, and Chia Balek Zamān Khān) is a village in Mahidasht Rural District, Mahidasht District, Kermanshah County, Kermanshah Province, Iran. At the 2006 census, its population was 117, in 25 families.
