= Samereh-ye Sofla =

Village in Kermanshah, Iran

Samereh-ye Sofla سامره سفلي
- Village
- Location within Iran
- Coordinates: 34°13′53″N 46°53′06″E
- Country: Iran
- Province: Kermanshah
- County: Kermanshah
- Bakhsh: Mahidasht
- Rural District: Mahidasht

Population (2006)
  - Total: 143
- Time zone: UTC+3:30 (IRST)
  - Summer (DST): UTC+4:30 (IRDT)

Samereh-ye Sofla (Persian: سامره سفلي, also Romanized as Sāmereh-ye Soflá) is a village in Mahidasht Rural District, Mahidasht District, Kermanshah County, Kermanshah Province, Iran. At the 2006 census, its population was 143, in 26 families.
