= Kol Tappeh, Ardabil =

Village in Ardabil province, Iran

Kol Tappeh Persian: كل تپه
- Village
- Location within Iran
- Coordinates: 39°15′09″N 47°31′34″E
- Country: Iran
- Province: Ardabil
- County: Aslan Duz
- District: Borran
- Rural District: Qeshlaq-e Gharbi

Population (2016)
  - Total: 105
- Time zone: UTC+3:30 (IRST)

Kol Tappeh (Persian: كل تپه) (Note: Also known as Gol Tappeh) is a village in Qeshlaq-e Gharbi Rural District of Borran District in Aslan Duz County, Ardabil province, Iran.

== Demographics ==
=== Population ===
At the time of the 2006 National Census, the village's population was 114 in 21 households, when it was in the former Aslan Duz District of Parsabad County. The following census in 2011 counted 111 people in 24 households. The 2016 census measured the population of the village as 105 people in 25 households.

In 2019, the district was separated from the county in the establishment of Aslan Duz County, and the rural district was transferred to the new Borran District.
