= Qeshlaq-e Tulkilu Gujehlar =

Village in Ardabil province, Iran

Qeshlaq-e Tulkilu Gujehlar Persian: قشلاق تولكيوگوجه لر
- Village
- Location within Iran
- Country: Iran
- Province: Ardabil
- County: Aslan Duz
- District: Borran
- Rural District: Borran

Population (2016)
  - Total: 125
- Time zone: UTC+3:30 (IRST)

Qeshlaq-e Tulkilu Gujehlar (Persian: قشلاق تولكيوگوجه لر) (Note: Also romanized as Qeshlāq-e Tūlkīū Gūjehlar; also known as Giklu Hajj Khan Aqa (گیکلو حاج خان آقا)) is a village in Borran Rural District of Borran District in Aslan Duz County, Ardabil province, Iran.

== Demographics ==
=== Population ===
At the time of the 2006 National Census, the village's population was 112 in 24 households, when it was in Qeshlaq-e Gharbi Rural District of the former Aslan Duz District in Parsabad County. The following census in 2011 counted 90 people in 22 households. The 2016 census measured the population of the village as 125 people in 35 households.

In 2019, the district was separated from the county in the establishment of Aslan Duz County, and the rural district was transferred to the new Borran District. Qeshlaq-e Tulkilu Gujehlar was transferred to Borran Rural District created in the district.
