= Qomsheh-ye Seyyed Amin =

Qomsheh-ye Seyyed Amin قمشه سيدامين
- Village
- Location within Iran
- Coordinates: 34°14′57″N 46°55′11″E
- Country: Iran
- Province: Kermanshah
- County: Kermanshah
- Bakhsh: Mahidasht
- Rural District: Mahidasht

Population (2006)
  - Total: 35
- Time zone: UTC+3:30 (IRST)
  - Summer (DST): UTC+4:30 (IRDT)

Qomsheh-ye Seyyed Amin (Persian: قمشه سيدامين, also Romanized as Qomsheh-ye Seyyed Amīn) is a village in Mahidasht Rural District, Mahidasht District, Kermanshah County, Kermanshah Province, Iran. At the 2006 census, its population was 35, in 10 families.
