= Dowkushkan-e Reza Khani =

Dowkushkan-e Reza Khani دوكوشكان رضاخاني
- Village
- Location within Iran
- Coordinates: 34°10′43″N 46°56′27″E
- Country: Iran
- Province: Kermanshah
- County: Kermanshah
- Bakhsh: Mahidasht
- Rural District: Mahidasht

Population (2006)
  - Total: 31
- Time zone: UTC+3:30 (IRST)
  - Summer (DST): UTC+4:30 (IRDT)

Dowkushkan-e Reza Khani (Persian: دوكوشكان رضاخاني, also Romanized as Dowkūshkān-e Reẕā Khānī; also known as Dokūshkān-e Reẕā Khānī) is a village in Mahidasht Rural District, Mahidasht District, Kermanshah County, Kermanshah Province, Iran. At the 2006 census, its population was 31, in 9 families.
