= Kashanbeh-ye Lak =

Kashanbeh-ye Lak كاشنبه لك
- Village
- Location within Iran
- Coordinates: 34°17′26″N 46°38′34″E
- Country: Iran
- Province: Kermanshah
- County: Kermanshah
- Bakhsh: Mahidasht
- Rural District: Chaqa Narges

Population (2006)
  - Total: 160
- Time zone: UTC+3:30 (IRST)
  - Summer (DST): UTC+4:30 (IRDT)

Kashanbeh-ye Lak (Persian: كاشنبه لك, also Romanized as Kāshanbeh-ye Lak) is a village in Chaqa Narges Rural District, Mahidasht District, Kermanshah County, Kermanshah Province, Iran. At the 2006 census, its population was 160, in 33 families.
