= Qeshlaq-e Qanbarlui-ye Olya =

Village in Ardabil province, Iran

Qeshlaq-e Qanbarlui-ye Olya Persian: قشلاق قنبرلوي عليا
- Village
- Location within Iran
- Coordinates: 39°14′10″N 47°37′13″E
- Country: Iran
- Province: Ardabil
- County: Aslan Duz
- District: Borran
- Rural District: Qeshlaq-e Gharbi

Population (2016)
  - Total: 63
- Time zone: UTC+3:30 (IRST)

Qeshlaq-e Qanbarlui-ye Olya (Persian: قشلاق قنبرلوي عليا) (Note: Also romanized as Qeshlāq-e Qanbarlūī-ye ‘Olyā) is a village in Qeshlaq-e Gharbi Rural District of Borran District in Aslan Duz County, Ardabil province, Iran.

== Demographics ==
=== Population ===
At the time of the 2006 National Census, the village's population was 95 in 20 households, when it was in the former Aslan Duz District of Parsabad County. The following census in 2011 counted 58 people in 14 households. The 2016 census measured the population of the village as 63 people in 15 households.

In 2019, the district was separated from the county in the establishment of Aslan Duz County, and the rural district was transferred to the new Borran District.
