= Qeshlaq-e Chukhli Quyi Hajj Hasan Akhteri =

Village in Ardabil province, Iran

Qeshlaq-e Chukhli Quyi Hajj Hasan Akhteri Persian: قشلاق چوخلي قوئي حاج حسن اختري
- Village
- Location within Iran
- Coordinates: 39°20′55″N 47°41′26″E
- Country: Iran
- Province: Ardabil
- County: Aslan Duz
- District: Borran
- Rural District: Borran

Population (2016)
  - Total: 39
- Time zone: UTC+3:30 (IRST)

Qeshlaq-e Chukhli Quyi Hajj Hasan Akhteri (Persian: قشلاق چوخلي قوئي حاج حسن اختري) (Note: Also romanized as Qeshlāq-e Chūkhlī Qūyī Ḩājj Ḩasan Ākhterī) is a village in Borran Rural District of Borran District in Aslan Duz County, Ardabil province, Iran.

== Demographics ==
=== Population ===
At the time of the 2006 National Census, the village's population was 34 in 10 households, when it was in Qeshlaq-e Gharbi Rural District of the former Aslan Duz District in Parsabad County. The following census in 2011 counted 29 people in eight households. The 2016 census measured the population of the village as 39 people in 10 households.

In 2019, the district was separated from the county in the establishment of Aslan Duz County, and the rural district was transferred to the new Borran District. Qeshlaq-e Chukhli Quyi Hajj Hasan Akhteri was transferred to Borran Rural District created in the district.
