= Kangarban-e Vosta =

Kangarban-e Vosta كنگربان وسطي
- Village
- Location within Iran
- Coordinates: 34°21′13″N 46°45′57″E
- Country: Iran
- Province: Kermanshah
- County: Kermanshah
- Bakhsh: Mahidasht
- Rural District: Chaqa Narges

Population (2006)
  - Total: 24
- Time zone: UTC+3:30 (IRST)
  - Summer (DST): UTC+4:30 (IRDT)

Kangarban-e Vosta (Persian: كنگربان وسطي, also Romanized as Kangarbān-e Vosţá and Kangarbān-e Vasaţī; also known as Fāntāwār, Kangarbān, and Kangarbān-e Vasaţ) is a village in Chaqa Narges Rural District, Mahidasht District, Kermanshah County, Kermanshah Province, Iran. At the 2006 census, its population was 24, in 6 families.
