= Dalik Yarqan =

Village in Ardabil province, Iran

Dalik Yarqan Persian: دليك يارقان
- Village
- Location within Iran
- Coordinates: 39°16′34″N 47°31′25″E
- Country: Iran
- Province: Ardabil
- County: Aslan Duz
- District: Borran
- Rural District: Qeshlaq-e Gharbi

Population (2016)
  - Total: 295
- Time zone: UTC+3:30 (IRST)

Dalik Yarqan (Persian: دليك يارقان) (Note: Also romanized as Dalīk Yārqān and Dalīk Yarqān; also known as Dalīk Yōrqān) is a village in, and the capital of, Qeshlaq-e Gharbi Rural District in Borran District of Aslan Duz County, Ardabil province, Iran. The previous capital of the rural district was the village of Borran-e Olya, now a city.

== Demographics ==
=== Population ===
At the time of the 2006 National Census, the village's population was 263 in 49 households, when it was in the former Aslan Duz District of Parsabad County. The following census in 2011 counted 224 people in 48 households. The 2016 census measured the population of the village as 295 people in 90 households.

In 2019, the district was separated from the county in the establishment of Aslan Duz County, and the rural district was transferred to the new Borran District.
