= Kangarban-e Sofla =

Village in Kermanshah, Iran

Kangarban-e Sofla كنگربان سفلي
- Village
- Location within Iran
- Coordinates: 34°20′48″N 46°46′17″E
- Country: Iran
- Province: Kermanshah
- County: Kermanshah
- Bakhsh: Mahidasht
- Rural District: Chaqa Narges

Population (2006)
  - Total: 240
- Time zone: UTC+3:30 (IRST)
  - Summer (DST): UTC+4:30 (IRDT)

Kangarban-e Sofla (Persian: كنگربان سفلي, also Romanized as Kangarbān-e Soflá; also known as Kangarbān-e Pā’īn and Paiāwand) is a village in Chaqa Narges Rural District, Mahidasht District, Kermanshah County, Kermanshah Province, Iran. At the 2006 census, its population was 240, in 51 families.
