= Dowkushkan-e Hoseynkhani =

Dowkushkan-e Hoseynkhani دوكوشكان حسينخاني
- Village
- Location within Iran
- Coordinates: 34°11′22″N 46°56′38″E
- Country: Iran
- Province: Kermanshah
- County: Kermanshah
- Bakhsh: Mahidasht
- Rural District: Mahidasht

Population (2006)
  - Total: 43
- Time zone: UTC+3:30 (IRST)
  - Summer (DST): UTC+4:30 (IRDT)

Dowkushkan-e Hoseynkhani (Persian: دوكوشكان حسينخاني, also Romanized as Dowkūshkān-e Ḩoseynkhānī; also known as Dokūshkān-e Ḩoseynkhānī) is a village in Mahidasht Rural District, Mahidasht District, Kermanshah County, Kermanshah Province, Iran. At the 2006 census, its population was 43, in 11 families.
