= Qeshlaq-e Chukhli Quyi Khodash =

Village in Ardabil province, Iran

Qeshlaq-e Chukhli Quyi Khodash Persian: قشلاق چوخلي قوئي خداش
- Village
- Location within Iran
- Coordinates: 39°19′48″N 47°40′57″E
- Country: Iran
- Province: Ardabil
- County: Aslan Duz
- District: Borran
- Rural District: Borran

Population (2016)
  - Total: 24
- Time zone: UTC+3:30 (IRST)

Qeshlaq-e Chukhli Quyi Khodash (Persian: قشلاق چوخلي قوئي خداش) (Note: Also romanized as Qeshlāq-e Chūkhlī Qūyī Khodāsh) is a village in Borran Rural District of Borran District in Aslan Duz County, Ardabil province, Iran.

== Demographics ==
=== Population ===
At the time of the 2006 National Census, the village's population was 24 in four households, when it was in Qeshlaq-e Gharbi Rural District of the former Aslan Duz District in Parsabad County. The following census in 2011 counted 18 people in five households. The 2016 census measured the population of the village as 24 people in seven households.

In 2019, the district was separated from the county in the establishment of Aslan Duz County, and the rural district was transferred to the new Borran District. Qeshlaq-e Chukhli Quyi Khodash was transferred to Borran Rural District created in the district.
