= Choqa Balk-e Kuchek =

Village in Kermanshah, Iran

Choqa Balk-e Kuchek چقابلک کوچک
- Village
- Country: Iran
- Province: Kermanshah
- County: Kermanshah
- Bakhsh: Mahidasht
- Rural District: Mahidasht

Population (2006)
  - Total: 70
- Time zone: UTC+3:30 (IRST)
  - Summer (DST): UTC+4:30 (IRDT)

Choqa Balk-e Kuchek (Persian: چقابلک کوچک, also Romanized as Choqā Balk-e Kūchek) is a village in Mahidasht Rural District, Mahidasht District, Kermanshah County, Kermanshah Province, Iran. At the 2006 census, its population was 70, in 15 families.
