= Qarash Qa Tappehsi-ye Olya =

Village in Ardabil province, Iran

Qarash Qa Tappehsi-ye Olya Persian: قارشقاتپه سي عليا
- Village
- Location within Iran
- Coordinates: 39°22′53″N 47°28′05″E
- Country: Iran
- Province: Ardabil
- County: Aslan Duz
- District: Borran
- Rural District: Borran

Population (2016)
  - Total: 108
- Time zone: UTC+3:30 (IRST)

Qarash Qa Tappehsi-ye Olya (Persian: قارشقاتپه سي عليا) (Note: Also romanized as Qārāsh Qā Tappehsī-ye ‘Olyā; also known as Qārāsh Qātepsī) is a village in Borran Rural District of Borran District in Aslan Duz County, Ardabil province, Iran.

== Demographics ==
=== Population ===
At the time of the 2006 National Census, the village's population was 135 in 22 households, when it was in Qeshlaq-e Gharbi Rural District of the former Aslan Duz District in Parsabad County. The following census in 2011 counted 103 people in 20 households. The 2016 census measured the population of the village as 108 people in 22 households.

In 2019, the district was separated from the county in the establishment of Aslan Duz County, and the rural district was transferred to the new Borran District. Qarash Qa Tappehsi-ye Olya was transferred to Borran Rural District created in the district.
