= Qeshlaq-e Qanbarlu Hajj Mohammad Hasan =

Village in Ardabil province, Iran

Qeshlaq-e Qanbarlu Hajj Mohammad Hasan Persian: قشلاق قنبرلوحاج محمدحسن
- Village
- Location within Iran
- Coordinates: 39°18′50″N 47°33′03″E
- Country: Iran
- Province: Ardabil
- County: Aslan Duz
- District: Borran
- Rural District: Qeshlaq-e Gharbi

Population (2016)
  - Total: 108
- Time zone: UTC+3:30 (IRST)

Qeshlaq-e Qanbarlu Hajj Mohammad Hasan (Persian: قشلاق قنبرلوحاج محمدحسن) (Note: Also romanized as Qeshlāq-e Qanbarlū Ḩājj Moḩammad Ḩasan) is a village in Qeshlaq-e Gharbi Rural District of Borran District in Aslan Duz County, Ardabil province, Iran.

== Demographics ==
=== Population ===
At the time of the 2006 National Census, the village's population was 141 in 20 households, when it was in the former Aslan Duz District of Parsabad County. The following census in 2011 counted 122 people in 27 households. The 2016 census measured the population of the village as 108 people in 26 households.

In 2019, the district was separated from the county in the establishment of Aslan Duz County, and the rural district was transferred to the new Borran District.
