= Choqa Balk-e Khvajeh Bashi =

Village in Kermanshah, Iran

Choqa Balk-e Khvajeh Bashi چقابلك خواجه باشي
- Village
- Location within Iran
- Coordinates: 34°19′00″N 46°47′00″E
- Country: Iran
- Province: Kermanshah
- County: Kermanshah
- Bakhsh: Mahidasht
- Rural District: Mahidasht

Population (2006)
  - Total: 222
- Time zone: UTC+3:30 (IRST)
  - Summer (DST): UTC+4:30 (IRDT)

Choqa Balk-e Khvajeh Bashi (Persian: چقابلك خواجه باشي, also Romanized as Choqā Balk-e Khvājeh Bāshī, Cheqā Balak-e Khvājeh Bāshī, Cheqā Balak Khvājeh Bāshī, Cheqā Balak Qal‘eh, Cheqā Belek-e Qal‘eh, Chīa Balek Khwāja Bashi, and Chīā Malek Khvājeh Bāshī) is a village in Mahidasht Rural District, Mahidasht District, Kermanshah County, Kermanshah Province, Iran. At the 2006 census, its population was 222, with 55 families.
