= Qeshlaq-e Chukhli Quyi Hajj Hasan Ali =

Village in Ardabil province, Iran

Qeshlaq-e Chukhli Quyi Hajj Hasan Ali Persian: قشلاق چوخلي قوئي حاج حسنعلي
- Village
- Country: Iran
- Province: Ardabil
- County: Aslan Duz
- District: Borran
- Rural District: Borran

Population (2016)
  - Total: 148
- Time zone: UTC+3:30 (IRST)

Qeshlaq-e Chukhli Quyi Hajj Hasan Ali (Persian: قشلاق چوخلي قوئي حاج حسنعلي) (Note: Also romanized as Qeshlāq-e Chūkhlī Qūyī Ḩājj Ḩasan ʿAlī) is a village in Borran Rural District of Borran District in Aslan Duz County, Ardabil province, Iran.

== Demographics ==
=== Population ===
At the time of the 2006 National Census, the village's population was 129 in 24 households, when it was in Qeshlaq-e Gharbi Rural District of the former Aslan Duz District in Parsabad County. The following census in 2011 counted 134 people in 28 households. The 2016 census measured the population of the village as 148 people in 38 households.

In 2019, the district was separated from the county in the establishment of Aslan Duz County, and the rural district was transferred to the new Borran District. Qeshlaq-e Chukhli Quyi Hajj Hasan Ali was transferred to Borran Rural District created in the district.
