= Cheshmeh Sefid, Mahidasht =

Village in Kermanshah province, Iran

Cheshmeh Sefid Persian: چشمه سفيد
- Village
- Location within Iran
- Coordinates: 34°16′51″N 47°00′41″E
- Country: Iran
- Province: Kermanshah
- County: Kermanshah
- District: Mahidasht
- Rural District: Mahidasht

Population (2016)
  - Total: 933
- Time zone: UTC+3:30 (IRST)

Cheshmeh Sefid (Persian: چشمه سفيد) (Note: Also romanized as Cheshmeh Sefīd; also known as Cheshmeh Sefīd-e ‘Olyā) is a village in Mahidasht Rural District of Mahidasht District, Kermanshah County, Kermanshah province, Iran.

== Demographics ==
=== Population ===
At the time of the 2006 National Census, the village's population was 921 in 244 households. The following census in 2011 counted 818 people in 242 households. The 2016 census measured the population of the village as 933 people in 300 households. It was the most populous village in its rural district.
