= Qomsheh-ye Seyyed Qasem =

Qomsheh-ye Seyyed Qasem قمشه سيدقاسم
- Village
- Location within Iran
- Coordinates: 34°16′00″N 46°54′00″E
- Country: Iran
- Province: Kermanshah
- County: Kermanshah
- Bakhsh: Mahidasht
- Rural District: Mahidasht

Population (2006)
  - Total: 494
- Time zone: UTC+3:30 (IRST)
  - Summer (DST): UTC+4:30 (IRDT)

Qomsheh-ye Seyyed Qasem (Persian: قمشه سيدقاسم, also Romanized as Qomsheh-ye Seyyed Qāsem) is a village in Mahidasht Rural District, Mahidasht District, Kermanshah County, Kermanshah Province, Iran. At the 2006 census, its population was 494, in 121 families.
