= Chahar Zabar-e Olya =

Chahar Zabar-e Olya چهارزبرعليا
- Village
- Location within Iran
- Coordinates: 34°13′51″N 46°41′01″E
- Country: Iran
- Province: Kermanshah
- County: Kermanshah
- Bakhsh: Mahidasht
- Rural District: Mahidasht

Population (2006)
  - Total: 173
- Time zone: UTC+3:30 (IRST)
  - Summer (DST): UTC+4:30 (IRDT)

Chahar Zabar-e Olya (Persian: چهارزبرعليا, also Romanized as Chahār Zabar-e ‘Olyā; also known as Chahār Zabar, Chahār Zabar-e Bālā, Chahār Zīr-e ‘Olyā, and Chehār Zabar) is a village in Mahidasht Rural District, Mahidasht District, Kermanshah County, Kermanshah Province, Iran. At the 2006 census, its population was 173 in 37 families.
