= Tazehabad-e Namivand =

Tazehabad-e Namivand تازه ابادناميوند
- Village
- Location within Iran
- Coordinates: 34°22′36″N 46°44′40″E
- Country: Iran
- Province: Kermanshah
- County: Kermanshah
- Bakhsh: Mahidasht
- Rural District: Chaqa Narges

Population (2006)
  - Total: 107
- Time zone: UTC+3:30 (IRST)
  - Summer (DST): UTC+4:30 (IRDT)

Tazehabad-e Namivand (Persian: تازه ابادناميوند, also Romanized as Tāzehābād-e Nāmīvand; also known as Namiawān, Nāmīvand, Nāmīvand-e ‘Olyā, Nāmīvand-e Vasaţ, Nāmīvand-e Vasaţī, Nām-i-Wān, and Nāmvand-e Vosţā) is a village in Chaqa Narges Rural District, Mahidasht District, Kermanshah County, Kermanshah Province, Iran. At the 2006 census, its population was 107, in 25 families.
