= Chahar Zabar-e Sofla =

Chahar Zabar-e Sofla چهارزبرسفلي
- Village
- Location within Iran
- Coordinates: 34°16′07″N 46°42′42″E
- Country: Iran
- Province: Kermanshah
- County: Kermanshah
- Bakhsh: Mahidasht
- Rural District: Mahidasht

Population (2006)
  - Total: 356
- Time zone: UTC+3:30 (IRST)
  - Summer (DST): UTC+4:30 (IRDT)

Chahar Zabar-e Sofla (Persian: چهارزبرسفلي, also Romanized as Chahār Zabar-e Soflá; also known as Chahār Zabar-e ‘Alīnaqī Khānī, Chahār Zabar-e Pā'īn, Chahār Zebr-e Pā’īn, and Chehār Zabar) is a village in Mahidasht Rural District, Mahidasht District, Kermanshah County, Kermanshah Province, Iran. At the 2006 census, its population was 356, in 76 families.
