= Qeshlaq-e Chukhli Quyi Bahadruhamat =

Village in Ardabil province, Iran

Qeshlaq-e Chukhli Quyi Bahadruhamat Persian: قشلاق چوخلي قوئي بهادروهمت
- Village
- Location within Iran
- Coordinates: 39°19′52″N 47°39′39″E
- Country: Iran
- Province: Ardabil
- County: Aslan Duz
- District: Borran
- Rural District: Borran

Population (2016)
  - Total: 33
- Time zone: UTC+3:30 (IRST)

Qeshlaq-e Chukhli Quyi Bahadruhamat (Persian: قشلاق چوخلي قوئي بهادروهمت) (Note: Also romanized as Qeshlāq-e Chūkhlī Qūyī Bahādrūhamat) is a village in Borran Rural District of Borran District in Aslan Duz County, Ardabil province, Iran.

== Demographics ==
=== Population ===
At the time of the 2006 National Census, the village's population was 58 in 16 households, when it was in Qeshlaq-e Gharbi Rural District of the former Aslan Duz District in Parsabad County. The following census in 2011 counted 28 people in nine households. The 2016 census measured the population of the village as 33 people in 11 households.

In 2019, the district was separated from the county in the establishment of Aslan Duz County, and the rural district was transferred to the new Borran District. Qeshlaq-e Chukhli Quyi Bahadruhamat was transferred to Borran Rural District created in the district.
