= Choqa Balk-e Alireza =

Choqa Balk-e Alireza چقابلك عليرضا
- Village
- Location within Iran
- Coordinates: 34°19′55″N 46°47′16″E
- Country: Iran
- Province: Kermanshah
- County: Kermanshah
- Bakhsh: Mahidasht
- Rural District: Chaqa Narges

Population (2006)
  - Total: 257
- Time zone: UTC+3:30 (IRST)
  - Summer (DST): UTC+4:30 (IRDT)

Choqa Balk-e Alireza (Persian: چقابلك عليرضا, also Romanized as Choqā Balk-e 'Alīreẕā) is a village in Chaqa Narges Rural District, Mahidasht District, Kermanshah County, Kermanshah province, Iran. At the 2006 census, its population was 257, in 56 families.
