= Qeshlaq-e Chukhli Quyi Hajj Akbar =

Village in Ardabil province, Iran

Qeshlaq-e Chukhli Quyi Hajj Akbar Persian: قشلاق چوخلي قوئي حاج اكبر
- Village
- Location within Iran
- Coordinates: 39°19′43″N 47°41′20″E
- Country: Iran
- Province: Ardabil
- County: Aslan Duz
- District: Borran
- Rural District: Borran

Population (2016)
  - Total: 45
- Time zone: UTC+3:30 (IRST)

Qeshlaq-e Chukhli Quyi Hajj Akbar (Persian: قشلاق چوخلي قوئي حاج اكبر) (Note: Also romanized as Qeshlāq-e Chūkhlī Qūyī Ḩājj Akbar) is a village in Borran Rural District of Borran District in Aslan Duz County, Ardabil province, Iran.

== Demographics ==
=== Population ===
At the time of the 2006 National Census, the village's population was 45 in seven households, when it was in Qeshlaq-e Gharbi Rural District of the former Aslan Duz District in Parsabad County. The following census in 2011 counted 38 people in nine households. The 2016 census measured the population of the village as 45 people in 14 households.

In 2019, the district was separated from the county in the establishment of Aslan Duz County, and the rural district was transferred to the new Borran District. Qeshlaq-e Chukhli Quyi Hajj Akbar was transferred to Borran Rural District created in the district.
