= Sari Qeshlaq =

Village in Ardabil province, Iran

Sari Qeshlaq Persian: ساري قشلاق
- Village
- Location within Iran
- Coordinates: 39°14′49″N 47°32′12″E
- Country: Iran
- Province: Ardabil
- County: Aslan Duz
- District: Borran
- Rural District: Qeshlaq-e Gharbi

Population (2016)
  - Total: 184
- Time zone: UTC+3:30 (IRST)

Sari Qeshlaq (Persian: ساري قشلاق) (Note: Also romanized as Sārī Qeshlāq) is a village in Qeshlaq-e Gharbi Rural District of Borran District in Aslan Duz County, Ardabil province, Iran.

== Demographics ==
=== Population ===
At the time of the 2006 National Census, the village's population was 189 in 33 households, when it was in the former Aslan Duz District of Parsabad County. The following census in 2011 counted 151 people in 33 households. The 2016 census measured the population as 184 in 48 households.

In 2019, the district was separated from the county in the establishment of Aslan Duz County, and the rural district was transferred to the new Borran District.
