= Qomsheh Tappeh =

Village in Kermanshah, Iran

Qomsheh Tappeh قمشه تپه
- Village
- Location within Iran
- Coordinates: 34°16′00″N 46°54′07″E
- Country: Iran
- Province: Kermanshah
- County: Kermanshah
- Bakhsh: Mahidasht
- Rural District: Mahidasht

Population (2006)
  - Total: 333
- Time zone: UTC+3:30 (IRST)
  - Summer (DST): UTC+4:30 (IRDT)

Qomsheh Tappeh (Persian: قمشه تپه; also known as Qomsheh-ye Tappeh Qāsem) is a village in Mahidasht Rural District, Mahidasht District, Kermanshah County, Kermanshah Province, Iran. At the 2006 census, the population was 333 people, in 72 families.
