= Kashanbeh-ye Sofla =

Kashanbeh-ye Sofla كاشنبه سفلي
- Village
- Country: Iran
- Province: Kermanshah
- County: Kermanshah
- Bakhsh: Mahidasht
- Rural District: Chaqa Narges

Population (2006)
  - Total: 203
- Time zone: UTC+3:30 (IRST)
  - Summer (DST): UTC+4:30 (IRDT)

Kashanbeh-ye Sofla (Persian: كاشنبه سفلي, also Romanized as Kāshanbeh-ye Soflá) is a village in Chaqa Narges Rural District, Mahidasht District, Kermanshah County, Kermanshah Province, Iran. At the 2006 census, its population was 203, in 40 families.
