= Choqa Naqd Ali =

Village in Kermanshah, Iran

Choqa Naqd Ali چقانقدعلي
- Village
- Location within Iran
- Coordinates: 34°21′29″N 46°42′49″E
- Country: Iran
- Province: Kermanshah
- County: Kermanshah
- Bakhsh: Mahidasht
- Rural District: Chaqa Narges

Population (2006)
  - Total: 159
- Time zone: UTC+3:30 (IRST)
  - Summer (DST): UTC+4:30 (IRDT)

Choqa Naqd Ali (Persian: چقانقدعلي, also Romanized as Choqā Naqd ‘Alī; and Chaqā Naqd-e ‘Alī; also known as Cheqā Kabūd, Cheqā Kabūd-e Naqd ‘Alī, Cheqā Naqd-e ‘Alī-ye ‘Olyā, Chia Kao, and Chīā Kū) is a village in Chaqa Narges Rural District, Mahidasht District, Kermanshah County, Kermanshah Province, Iran. At the 2006 census, its population was 159, in 39 families.
