= Taqi Kandi, Aslan Duz =

Village in Ardabil province, Iran

Taqi Kandi Persian: تقي كندي
- Village
- Location within Iran
- Coordinates: 39°17′08″N 47°31′43″E
- Country: Iran
- Province: Ardabil
- County: Aslan Duz
- District: Borran
- Rural District: Qeshlaq-e Gharbi

Population (2016)
  - Total: 212
- Time zone: UTC+3:30 (IRST)

Taqi Kandi (Persian: تقي كندي) (Note: Also romanized as Ţāqī Kandī) is a village in Qeshlaq-e Gharbi Rural District of Borran District in Aslan Duz County, Ardabil province, Iran.

== Demographics ==
=== Population ===
At the time of the 2006 National Census, the village's population was 73 in 12 households, when it was in the former Aslan Duz District of Parsabad County. The following census in 2011 counted 74 people in 15 households. The 2016 census measured the population of the village as 80 people in 22 households.

In 2019, the district was separated from the county in the establishment of Aslan Duz County, and the rural district was transferred to the new Borran District.
