= Amir Khanlu =

Village in Ardabil province, Iran

Amir Khanlu Persian: اميرخانلو
- Village
- Location within Iran
- Country: Iran
- Province: Ardabil
- County: Aslan Duz
- District: Borran
- Rural District: Qeshlaq-e Gharbi

Population (2016)
  - Total: 87
- Time zone: UTC+3:30 (IRST)

Amir Khanlu (Persian: اميرخانلو) (Note: Also romanized as Amīr Khānlū) is a village in Qeshlaq-e Gharbi Rural District of Borran District in Aslan Duz County, Ardabil province, Iran.

== Demographics ==
=== Population ===
At the time of the 2006 National Census, the village's population was 135 in 25 households, when it was in the former Aslan Duz District of Parsabad County. The following census in 2011 counted 118 people in 23 households. The 2016 census measured the population of the village as 87 people in 19 households.

In 2019, the district was separated from the county in the establishment of Aslan Duz County, and the rural district was transferred to the new Borran District.
