= Qomsheh-ye Baba Karam Khan =

Qomsheh-ye Baba Karam Khan قمشه باباكرم خان
- Village
- Location within Iran
- Coordinates: 34°14′29″N 46°56′18″E
- Country: Iran
- Province: Kermanshah
- County: Kermanshah
- Bakhsh: Mahidasht
- Rural District: Mahidasht

Population (2006)
  - Total: 99
- Time zone: UTC+3:30 (IRST)
  - Summer (DST): UTC+4:30 (IRDT)

Qomsheh-ye Baba Karam Khan (Persian: قمشه باباكرم خان, also Romanized as Qomsheh-ye Bābā Karam Khān; also known as Qomsheh-ye Karam Khān) is a village in Mahidasht Rural District, Mahidasht District, Kermanshah County, Kermanshah Province, Iran. At the 2006 census, its population was 99, in 22 families.
