= Esmail Kandi-ye Yek =

Village in Ardabil province, Iran

Esmail Kandi-ye Yek Persian: اسماعيل كندي1
- Village
- Location within Iran
- Coordinates: 39°22′20″N 47°28′26″E
- Country: Iran
- Province: Ardabil
- County: Aslan Duz
- District: Borran
- Rural District: Borran

Population (2016)
  - Total: 37
- Time zone: UTC+3:30 (IRST)

Esmail Kandi-ye Yek (Persian: اسماعيل كندي1) (Note: Also romanized as Esmā‘īl Kandī-ye Yek; also known as Esmā‘īl Kandī) is a village in Borran Rural District of Borran District in Aslan Duz County, Ardabil province, Iran.

== Demographics ==
=== Population ===
At the time of the 2006 National Census, the village's population was 34 in five households, when it was in Qeshlaq-e Gharbi Rural District of the former Aslan Duz District in Parsabad County. The following census in 2011 counted 21 people in four households. The 2016 census measured the population of the village as 37 people in 10 households.

In 2019, the district was separated from the county in the establishment of Aslan Duz County, and the rural district was transferred to the new Borran District. Esmail Kandi-ye Yek was transferred to Borran Rural District created in the district.
