= Choqa Kabud, Mahidasht =

Choqa Kabud چقاكبود
- Village
- Location within Iran
- Coordinates: 34°20′52″N 46°42′05″E
- Country: Iran
- Province: Kermanshah
- County: Kermanshah
- Bakhsh: Mahidasht
- Rural District: Chaqa Narges

Population (2006)
  - Total: 222
- Time zone: UTC+3:30 (IRST)
  - Summer (DST): UTC+4:30 (IRDT)

Choqa Kabud (Persian: چقاكبود, also Romanized as Choqā Kabūd and Chaqā Kabūd) is a village in Chaqa Narges Rural District, Mahidasht District, Kermanshah County, Kermanshah province, Iran. During the 2006 census, its population was 222, in 45 families.
