= Belmaneh-ye Olya =

Village in Kermanshah, Iran

Belmaneh-ye Olya بلمانه عليا
- Village
- Location within Iran
- Coordinates: 34°14′30″N 46°51′57″E
- Country: Iran
- Province: Kermanshah
- County: Kermanshah
- Bakhsh: Mahidasht
- Rural District: Mahidasht

Population (2006)
  - Total: 121
- Time zone: UTC+3:30 (IRST)
  - Summer (DST): UTC+4:30 (IRDT)

Belmaneh-ye Olya (Persian: بلمانه عليا, also Romanized as Belmāneh-ye ‘Olyā; also known as Belmāneh-ye Rafīqābād) is a village in Mahidasht Rural District, Mahidasht District, Kermanshah County, Kermanshah Province, Iran. At the 2006 census, its population was 121, in 27 families.
