= Qeshlaq-e Qanbarlu Rostam Qanbarlui-ye Vosta =

Village in Ardabil province, Iran

Qeshlaq-e Qanbarlu Rostam Qanbarlui-ye Vosta Persian: قشلاق قنبرلورستم قنبرلوي وسطي
- Village
- Location within Iran
- Coordinates: 39°16′19″N 47°35′47″E
- Country: Iran
- Province: Ardabil
- County: Aslan Duz
- District: Borran
- Rural District: Qeshlaq-e Gharbi

Population (2016)
  - Total: 315
- Time zone: UTC+3:30 (IRST)

Qeshlaq-e Qanbarlu Rostam Qanbarlui-ye Vosta (Persian: قشلاق قنبرلورستم قنبرلوي وسطي) (Note: Also romanized as Qeshlāq-e Qanbarlū Rostam Qanbarlūī-ye Vosţá) is a village in Qeshlaq-e Gharbi Rural District of Borran District in Aslan Duz County, Ardabil province, Iran.

== Demographics ==
=== Population ===
At the time of the 2006 National Census, the village's population was 422 in 59 households, when it was in the former Aslan Duz District of Parsabad County. The following census in 2011 counted 315 people in 66 households. The 2016 census measured the population of the village as 315 people in 88 households.

In 2019, the district was separated from the county in the establishment of Aslan Duz County, and the rural district was transferred to the new Borran District.
