= Qeshlaq-e Chukhli Quyi Hajj Ramazan =

Village in Ardabil province, Iran

Qeshlaq-e Chukhli Quyi Hajj Ramazan Persian: قشلاق چوخلي قوئي حاج رمضان
- Village
- Location within Iran
- Coordinates: 39°21′03″N 47°41′26″E
- Country: Iran
- Province: Ardabil
- County: Aslan Duz
- District: Borran
- Rural District: Borran

Population (2016)
  - Total: 75
- Time zone: UTC+3:30 (IRST)

Qeshlaq-e Chukhli Quyi Hajj Ramazan (Persian: قشلاق چوخلي قوئي حاج رمضان) (Note: Also romanized as Qeshlāq-e Chūkhlī Qūyī Ḩājj Ramaz̤ān) is a village in Borran Rural District of Borran District in Aslan Duz County, Ardabil province, Iran.

== Demographics ==
=== Population ===
At the time of the 2006 National Census, the village's population was 86 in 14 households, when it was in Qeshlaq-e Gharbi Rural District of the former Aslan Duz District in Parsabad County. The following census in 2011 counted 68 people in 13 households. The 2016 census measured the population of the village as 75 people in 19 households.

In 2019, the district was separated from the county in the establishment of Aslan Duz County, and the rural district was transferred to the new Borran District. Qeshlaq-e Chukhli Quyi Hajj Ramazan was transferred to Borran Rural District created in the district.
