= Patiabad, Mahidasht =

Patiabad پتي اباد
- Village
- Location within Iran
- Coordinates: 34°23′14″N 46°41′26″E
- Country: Iran
- Province: Kermanshah
- County: Kermanshah
- Bakhsh: Mahidasht
- Rural District: Chaqa Narges

Population (2006)
  - Total: 172
- Time zone: UTC+3:30 (IRST)
  - Summer (DST): UTC+4:30 (IRDT)

Patiabad (Persian: پتي اباد, also Romanized as Patīābād) is a village in Chaqa Narges Rural District, Mahidasht District, Kermanshah County, Kermanshah Province, Iran. At the 2006 census, its population was 172, in 37 families.
