= Kashanbeh-ye Chahardangi =

Kashanbeh-ye Chahardangi كاشنبه چهاردانگي
- Village
- Location within Iran
- Coordinates: 34°17′54″N 46°39′20″E
- Country: Iran
- Province: Kermanshah
- County: Kermanshah
- Bakhsh: Mahidasht
- Rural District: Chaqa Narges

Population (2006)
  - Total: 198
- Time zone: UTC+3:30 (IRST)
  - Summer (DST): UTC+4:30 (IRDT)

Kashanbeh-ye Chahardangi (Persian: كاشنبه چهاردانگي, also Romanized as Kāshanbeh-ye Chahārdāngī and Kāshanbeh-ye Chahār Dāngī) is a village in Chaqa Narges Rural District, Mahidasht District, Kermanshah County, Kermanshah Province, Iran. At the 2006 census, its population was 198, in 45 families.
