= Zalakeh-ye Farajollah-e Montazeri =

Zalakeh-ye Farajollah-e Montazeri ذالكه فرج اله منتظري
- Village
- Location within Iran
- Coordinates: 34°15′03″N 46°49′38″E
- Country: Iran
- Province: Kermanshah
- County: Kermanshah
- Bakhsh: Mahidasht
- Rural District: Mahidasht

Population (2006)
  - Total: 62
- Time zone: UTC+3:30 (IRST)
  - Summer (DST): UTC+4:30 (IRDT)

Zalakeh-ye Farajollah-e Montazeri (Persian: ذالكه فرج اله منتظري, also Romanized as Zālakeh-ye Farajollāh-e Montaz̧erī; also known as Dālakeh-ye Ḩājjī Faraj, Z̄ālakeh, Z̄ālakeh-ye Ḩājī Faraj, Zalekeh, and Z̄ālkeh-ye Ḩājjī Faraj) is a village in Mahidasht Rural District, Mahidasht District, Kermanshah County, Kermanshah Province, Iran. With eleven families, it had a population of 62 according to a 2006 census.
