= Chaqa Narges =

Village in Kermanshah province, Iran

Chaqa Narges Persian: چقا نرگس
- Village
- Location within Iran
- Coordinates: 34°20′00″N 46°43′25″E
- Country: Iran
- Province: Kermanshah
- County: Kermanshah
- District: Mahidasht
- Rural District: Chaqa Narges

Population (2016)
  - Total: 592
- Time zone: UTC+3:30 (IRST)

Chaqa Narges (Persian: چقانرگس) (Note: Also romanized as Chaqā Narges, Cheqā Narges, and Choqā Narges; also known as Angīlīse, Chīā Narges, and Chīa Nargīs) is a village in, and the capital of, Chaqa Narges Rural District of Mahidasht District, Kermanshah County, Kermanshah province, Iran.

== Demographics ==
=== Population ===
At the time of the 2006 National Census, the village's population was 771 in 157 households. The following census in 2011 counted 689 people in 169 households. The 2016 census measured the population of the village as 592 people in 169 households. It was the most populous village in its rural district.
