= Alamlu Tabriz =

Village in Ardabil province, Iran

Alamlu Tabriz Persian: الم لوتبريز
- Village
- Location within Iran
- Coordinates: 39°23′25″N 47°37′36″E
- Country: Iran
- Province: Ardabil
- County: Aslan Duz
- District: Borran
- Rural District: Borran

Population (2016)
  - Total: 219
- Time zone: UTC+3:30 (IRST)

Alamlu Tabriz (Persian: الم لوتبريز) (Note: Also romanized as Ālamlū Tabrīz) is a village in Borran Rural District of Borran District in Aslan Duz County, Ardabil province, Iran.

== Demographics ==
=== Population ===
At the time of the 2006 National Census, the village's population was 229 in 36 households, when it was in Qeshlaq-e Gharbi Rural District of the former Aslan Duz District in Parsabad County. The following census in 2011 counted 187 people in 46 households. The 2016 census measured the population of the village as 219 people in 62 households.

In 2019, the district was separated from the county in the establishment of Aslan Duz County, and the rural district was transferred to the new Borran District. Alamlu Tabriz was transferred to Borran Rural District created in the district.
