= Alamlu Shah Ali =

Village in Ardabil province, Iran

Alamlu Shah Ali Persian: الم لوشاه علي
- Village
- Location within Iran
- Coordinates: 39°23′15″N 47°38′58″E
- Country: Iran
- Province: Ardabil
- County: Aslan Duz
- District: Borran
- Rural District: Borran

Population (2016)
  - Total: 100
- Time zone: UTC+3:30 (IRST)

Alamlu Shah Ali (Persian: الم لوشاه علي) (Note: Also romanized as Ālamlū Shāh ʿAlī) is a village in Borran Rural District of Borran District in Aslan Duz County, Ardabil province, Iran.

== Demographics ==
=== Population ===
At the time of the 2006 National Census, the village's population was 66 in 16 households, when it was in Qeshlaq-e Gharbi Rural District of the former Aslan Duz District in Parsabad County. The following census in 2011 counted 82 people in 22 households. The 2016 census measured the population of the village as 100 people in 31 households.

In 2019, the district was separated from the county in the establishment of Aslan Duz County, and the rural district was transferred to the new Borran District. Alamlu Shah Ali was transferred to Borran Rural District created in the district.
