= Qeshlaq-e Chukhli Quyi Hoseyn Aq Bashlar =

Village in Ardabil province, Iran

Qeshlaq-e Chukhli Quyi Hoseyn Aq Bashlar Persian: قشلاق چوخلي قوئي حسين اق باشلار
- Village
- Location within Iran
- Coordinates: 39°21′22″N 47°39′49″E
- Country: Iran
- Province: Ardabil
- County: Aslan Duz
- District: Borran
- Rural District: Borran

Population (2016)
  - Total: 114
- Time zone: UTC+3:30 (IRST)

Qeshlaq-e Chukhli Quyi Hoseyn Aq Bashlar (Persian: قشلاق چوخلي قوئي حسين اق باشلار) (Note: Also romanized as Qeshlāq-e Chūkhlī Qūyī Ḩoseyn Āq Bāshlār) is a village in Borran Rural District of Borran District in Aslan Duz County, Ardabil province, Iran.

== Demographics ==
=== Population ===
At the time of the 2006 National Census, the village's population was 74 in 15 households, when it was in Qeshlaq-e Gharbi Rural District of the former Aslan Duz District in Parsabad County. The following census in 2011 counted 117 people in 28 households. The 2016 census measured the population of the village as 114 people in 34 households.

In 2019, the district was separated from the county in the establishment of Aslan Duz County, and the rural district was transferred to the new Borran District. Qeshlaq-e Chukhli Quyi Hoseyn Aq Bashlar was transferred to Borran Rural District created in the district.
