= Qomsheh-ye Seyyed Yaqub =

Qomsheh-ye Seyyed Yaqub قمشه سيديعقوب
- Village
- Location within Iran
- Coordinates: 34°17′24″N 46°50′30″E
- Country: Iran
- Province: Kermanshah
- County: Kermanshah
- Bakhsh: Mahidasht
- Rural District: Mahidasht

Population (2006)
  - Total: 492
- Time zone: UTC+3:30 (IRST)
  - Summer (DST): UTC+4:30 (IRDT)

Qomsheh-ye Seyyed Yaqub (Persian: قمشه سيديعقوب, also Romanized as Qomsheh-ye Seyyed Ya‘qūb) is a village in Mahidasht Rural District, Mahidasht District, Kermanshah County, Kermanshah Province, Iran. At the 2006 census, its population was 492, in 119 families.
