= Namivand-e Sofla =

Village in Kermanshah, Iran

Namivand-e Sofla ناميوندسفلي
- Village
- Location within Iran
- Coordinates: 34°22′14″N 46°45′09″E
- Country: Iran
- Province: Kermanshah
- County: Kermanshah
- Bakhsh: Mahidasht
- Rural District: Chaqa Narges

Population (2006)
  - Total: 167
- Time zone: UTC+3:30 (IRST)
  - Summer (DST): UTC+4:30 (IRDT)

Namivand-e Sofla (Persian: ناميوندسفلي, also Romanized as Nāmīvand-e Soflá; also known as Nāmīvand-e Pā'īn) is a village in Chaqa Narges Rural District, Mahidasht District, Kermanshah County, Kermanshah Province, Iran. At the 2006 census, its population was 167, in 36 families.
