= Qarash Qa Tappehsi =

Qarash Qa Tappehsi (Persian: قارشقاتپه سي), also rendered as Qarash Qatepsi, may refer to:

- Qarash Qa Tappehsi-ye Olya
- Qarash Qa Tappehsi-ye Sofla
