= Samereh-ye Olya =

Samereh-ye Olya سامره عليا
- Village
- Location within Iran
- Coordinates: 34°14′02″N 46°53′12″E
- Country: Iran
- Province: Kermanshah
- County: Kermanshah
- Bakhsh: Mahidasht
- Rural District: Mahidasht

Population (2006)
  - Total: 227
- Time zone: UTC+3:30 (IRST)
  - Summer (DST): UTC+4:30 (IRDT)

Samereh-ye Olya (Persian: سامره عليا, also Romanized as Sāmereh-ye ‘Olyā; also known as Samarrah and Sāmereh) is a village in Mahidasht Rural District, Mahidasht District, Kermanshah County, Kermanshah Province, Iran. At the 2006 census, its population was 227, in 56 families.
