= Belmaneh-ye Sofla =

Village in Kermanshah, Iran

Belmaneh-ye Sofla بلمانه سفلي
- Village
- Location within Iran
- Coordinates: 34°14′25″N 46°51′52″E
- Country: Iran
- Province: Kermanshah
- County: Kermanshah
- Bakhsh: Mahidasht
- Rural District: Mahidasht

Population (2006)
  - Total: 161
- Time zone: UTC+3:30 (IRST)
  - Summer (DST): UTC+4:30 (IRDT)

Belmaneh-ye Sofla (Persian: بلمانه سفلي, also Romanized as Belmāneh-ye Soflá) is a village in Mahidasht Rural District, Mahidasht District, Kermanshah County, Kermanshah Province, Iran. At the 2006 census, its population was 161, in 39 families.
