= Baulk =

Baulk may refer to:

- Baulk, areas on various types of billiard table
- Baulk, a wall of intact earth in an archaeological excavation
- Baulk road, a type of railway track
- Baulking

- Baulking, tactic used in water polo to trick a goalkeeper into thinking that the player is shooting
- Baulking, a village in Oxfordshire England

- Baulk Head to Mullion, a coastal site of Special Scientific Interest (SSSI) in Cornwall, England

== See also ==
- Balk (disambiguation)
