= Duh Darrehsi =

Village in Ardabil province, Iran

Duh Darrehsi Persian: دوه دره سي
- Village
- Location within Iran
- Coordinates: 39°13′48″N 47°32′47″E
- Country: Iran
- Province: Ardabil
- County: Aslan Duz
- District: Borran
- Rural District: Qeshlaq-e Gharbi

Population (2016)
  - Total: Below reporting threshold
- Time zone: UTC+3:30 (IRST)

Duh Darrehsi (Persian: دوه دره سي) (Note: Also romanized as Dūh Darrehsī) is a village in Qeshlaq-e Gharbi Rural District of Borran District in Aslan Duz County, Ardabil province, Iran.

== Demographics ==
=== Population ===
At the time of the 2006 National Census, the village's population was 53 in nine households, when it was in the former Aslan Duz District of Parsabad County. The following census in 2011 counted 16 people in four households. The 2016 census measured the population of the village as below the reporting threshold.

In 2019, the district was separated from the county in the establishment of Aslan Duz County, and the rural district was transferred to the new Borran District.
