= Valcke =

Valcke is a surname. Notable people with the surname include:

- Jérôme Valcke (born 1960), French football manager
- Viceroy Louis Valcke (1857–1940), Belgian soldier and colonial administrator.
- Paul Valcke (born 1914), Belgian fencer
- Pierre Valcke, Belgian field hockey player

== See also ==
- Valck
