= Gowzalli, Ardabil =

Village in Ardabil province, Iran

Gowzalli Persian: گوزلي
- Village
- Location within Iran
- Coordinates: 39°18′14″N 47°30′31″E
- Country: Iran
- Province: Ardabil
- County: Aslan Duz
- District: Borran
- Rural District: Qeshlaq-e Gharbi

Population (2016)
  - Total: 212
- Time zone: UTC+3:30 (IRST)

Gowzalli (Persian: گوزلي) (Note: Also romanized as Gowzallī) is a village in Qeshlaq-e Gharbi Rural District of Borran District in Aslan Duz County, Ardabil province, Iran.

== Demographics ==
=== Population ===
At the time of the 2006 National Census, the village's population was 260 in 50 households, when it was in the former Aslan Duz District of Parsabad County. The following census in 2011 counted 148 people in 35 households. The 2016 census measured the population of the village as 212 people in 68 households.

In 2019, the district was separated from the county in the establishment of Aslan Duz County, and the rural district was transferred to the new Borran District.
