= Qeshlaq-e Qabaleh Gah Abbas Ali =

Village in Ardabil province, Iran

Qeshlaq-e Qabaleh Gah Abbas Ali Persian: قشلاق قبله گاه عباسعلي
- Village
- Country: Iran
- Province: Ardabil
- County: Aslan Duz
- District: Borran
- Rural District: Qeshlaq-e Gharbi

Population (2016)
  - Total: Below reporting threshold
- Time zone: UTC+3:30 (IRST)

Qeshlaq-e Qabaleh Gah Abbas Ali (Persian: قشلاق قبله گاه عباسعلي) (Note: Also romanized as Qeshlāq-e Qabaleh Gāh ʿAbbās ʿAlī) is a village in Qeshlaq-e Gharbi Rural District of Borran District in Aslan Duz County, Ardabil province, Iran.

== Demographics ==
=== Population ===
At the time of the 2006 National Census, the village's population was 20 in seven households, when it was in the former Aslan Duz District of Parsabad County. The following census in 2011 counted a population below the reporting threshold. The 2016 census again measured the population of the village as below the reporting threshold.

In 2019, the district was separated from the county in the establishment of Aslan Duz County, and the rural district was transferred to the new Borran District.
