= Qeshlaq-e Sumuklu Heydar =

Village in Ardabil province, Iran

Qeshlaq-e Sumuklu Heydar Persian: قشلاق سوموكلوحيدر
- Village
- Country: Iran
- Province: Ardabil
- County: Aslan Duz
- District: Borran
- Rural District: Qeshlaq-e Gharbi

Population (2016)
  - Total: 43
- Time zone: UTC+3:30 (IRST)

Qeshlaq-e Sumuklu Heydar (Persian: قشلاق سوموكلوحيدر) (Note: Also romanized as Qeshlāq-e Sūmūklū Ḩeydar) is a village in Qeshlaq-e Gharbi Rural District of Borran District in Aslan Duz County, Ardabil province, Iran.

== Demographics ==
=== Population ===
At the time of the 2006 National Census, the village's population was 21 in 5 households, when it was in the former Aslan Duz District of Parsabad County. The village did not appear in the following census of 2011. The 2016 census measured the population of the village as 43 people in 13 households.

In 2019, the district was separated from the county in the establishment of Aslan Duz County, and the rural district was transferred to the new Borran District.
