= Qeshlaq-e Iman Quyi Mashhad Ali =

Village in Ardabil province, Iran

Qeshlaq-e Iman Quyi Mashhad Ali Persian: قشلاق ايمان قويي مشهدعلي
- Village
- Location within Iran
- Coordinates: 39°15′58″N 47°38′19″E
- Country: Iran
- Province: Ardabil
- County: Aslan Duz
- District: Borran
- Rural District: Qeshlaq-e Gharbi

Population (2016)
  - Total: 273
- Time zone: UTC+3:30 (IRST)

Qeshlaq-e Iman Quyi Mashhad Ali (Persian: قشلاق ايمان قويي مشهدعلي) (Note: Also romanized as Qeshlāq-e Īmān Qūyī Mashhad ʿAlī) is a village in Qeshlaq-e Gharbi Rural District of Borran District in Aslan Duz County, Ardabil province, Iran.

== Demographics ==
=== Population ===
At the time of the 2006 National Census, the village's population was 286 in 53 households, when it was in the former Aslan Duz District of Parsabad County. The following census in 2011 counted 276 people in 65 households. The 2016 census measured the population of the village as 273 people in 73 households.

In 2019, the district was separated from the county in the establishment of Aslan Duz County, and the rural district was transferred to the new Borran District.
