= Qeshlaq-e Farajollah Nemaz =

Village in Ardabil province, Iran

Qeshlaq-e Farajollah Nemaz Persian: قشلاق فرج اله نماز
- Village
- Location within Iran
- Coordinates: 39°22′47″N 47°35′57″E
- Country: Iran
- Province: Ardabil
- County: Aslan Duz
- District: Borran
- Rural District: Borran

Population (2016)
  - Total: 49
- Time zone: UTC+3:30 (IRST)

Qeshlaq-e Farajollah Nemaz (Persian: قشلاق فرج اله نماز) (Note: Also romanized as Qeshlāq-e Farajollah Nemāz) is a village in Borran Rural District of Borran District in Aslan Duz County, Ardabil province, Iran.

== Demographics ==
=== Population ===
At the time of the 2006 National Census, the village's population was 22 in four households, when it was in Qeshlaq-e Gharbi Rural District of the former Aslan Duz District in Parsabad County. The following census in 2011 counted 56 people in 15 households. The 2016 census measured the population of the village as 49 people in 15 households.

In 2019, the district was separated from the county in the establishment of Aslan Duz County, and the rural district was transferred to the new Borran District. Qeshlaq-e Farajollah Nemaz was transferred to Borran Rural District created in the district.
