= Borran-e Olya =

City in Ardabil province, Iran

Borran-e Olya Persian: بران عليا
- Village
- Location within Iran
- Coordinates: 39°19′03″N 47°31′09″E
- Country: Iran
- Province: Ardabil
- County: Aslan Duz
- District: Borran
- Established as a city: 2023

Population (2016)
  - Total: 1,508
- Time zone: UTC+3:30 (IRST)

Borran-e Olya (Persian: بران عليا) (Note: Also romanized as Borrān-e ‘Olyā; also known as Barān and Borrān-e Bālā) is a city in, and the capital of, Borran District in Aslan Duz County, Ardabil province, Iran. As a village, it was the capital of Qeshlaq-e Gharbi Rural District until its capital was transferred to the village of Dalik Yarqan.

== Demographics ==
=== Population ===
At the time of the 2006 National Census, Borran-e Olya's population was 1,180 in 236 households, when it was a village in Qeshlaq-e Gharbi Rural District of the former Aslan Duz District in Parsabad County. The following census in 2011 counted 1,102 people in 275 households. The 2016 census measured the population of the village as 1,508 people in 451 households. It was the most populous village in its rural district.

In 2019, the district was separated from the county in the establishment of Aslan Duz County, and the rural district was transferred to the new Borran District. Borran-e Olya was elevated to the status of a city in 2023.
