= Qeshlaq-e Tak Quyi Matlab va Ali Khan =

Village in Ardabil province, Iran

Qeshlaq-e Tak Quyi Matlab va Ali Khan Persian: قشلاق تك قوئي مطلب وعلي خان
- Village
- Location within Iran
- Coordinates: 39°16′41″N 47°39′59″E
- Country: Iran
- Province: Ardabil
- County: Aslan Duz
- District: Borran
- Rural District: Qeshlaq-e Gharbi

Population (2016)
  - Total: 35
- Time zone: UTC+3:30 (IRST)

Qeshlaq-e Tak Quyi Matlab va Ali Khan (Persian: قشلاق تك قوئي مطلب وعلي خان) (Note: Also romanized as Qeshlāq-e Tak Qūyī Maṭlab va ʿAlī Khān) is a village in Qeshlaq-e Gharbi Rural District of Borran District in Aslan Duz County, Ardabil province, Iran.

== Demographics ==
=== Population ===
At the time of the 2006 National Census, the village's population was 99 in 16 households, when it was in the former Aslan Duz District of Parsabad County. The following census in 2011 counted 72 people in 15 households. The 2016 census measured the population of the village as 35 people in 10 households.

In 2019, the district was separated from the county in the establishment of Aslan Duz County, and the rural district was transferred to the new Borran District.
