= Borran Rural District =

Rural district in Ardabil province, Iran

Borran Rural District Persian: دهستان بران
- Rural District
- Location within Iran
- Coordinates: 39°22′N 47°36′E
- Country: Iran
- Province: Ardabil
- County: Aslan Duz
- District: Borran
- Established: 2019
- Capital: Borran-e Sofla
- Time zone: UTC+3:30 (IRST)

Borran Rural District (Persian: دهستان بران) is in Borran District of Aslan Duz County, Ardabil province, Iran. Its capital is the village of Borran-e Sofla, whose population at the time of the 2016 National Census was 617 people in 194 households.

== History ==
In 2019, Aslan Duz District was separated from Parsabad County in the establishment of Aslan Duz County, and Borran Rural District was created in the new Borran District.

=== Other villages in the rural district ===
- Alamlu Shah Ali
- Alamlu Tabriz
- Esmail Kandi-ye Do
- Esmail Kandi-ye Yek
- Qarah Takanlu
- Qarash Qa Tappehsi-ye Olya
- Qeshlaq-e Alapapakh
- Qeshlaq-e Ayaq Ayiri Hajj Mohammad Ali
- Qeshlaq-e Ayiri Darreh Hajj Mahbat
- Qeshlaq-e Chukhli Quyi Bahadruhamat
- Qeshlaq-e Chukhli Quyi Hajj Akbar
- Qeshlaq-e Chukhli Quyi Hajj Hasan Akhteri
- Qeshlaq-e Chukhli Quyi Hajj Hasan Ali
- Qeshlaq-e Chukhli Quyi Hajj Ramazan
- Qeshlaq-e Chukhli Quyi Hoseyn Aq Bashlar
- Qeshlaq-e Chukhli Quyi Khodash
- Qeshlaq-e Farajollah Hajj Sarkhan
- Qeshlaq-e Farajollah Hasan
- Qeshlaq-e Farajollah Nemaz
- Qeshlaq-e Farajollah Qadir
- Qeshlaq-e Hajj Taleb
- Qeshlaq-e Hajji Balakhan
- Qeshlaq-e Hajji Gholam
- Qeshlaq-e Hajji Panjalu
- Qeshlaq-e Jalilu
- Qeshlaq-e Kazem Owghlan
- Qeshlaq-e Kazem Owghlan Asghar
- Qeshlaq-e Muzuhlar
- Qeshlaq-e Ojaq-e Yek
- Qeshlaq-e Qarah Takanlu Amrollah
- Qeshlaq-e Tarrehchi
- Qeshlaq-e Tulkilu Gol Moradi
- Qeshlaq-e Tulkilu Gujehlar
- Qusha Qeshlaq-e Hasan
