= Qeshlaq-e Sari Quyi Mikail =

Village in Ardabil province, Iran

Qeshlaq-e Sari Quyi Mikail Persian: قشلاق ساري قوئي ميكائيل
- Village
- Country: Iran
- Province: Ardabil
- County: Aslan Duz
- District: Borran
- Rural District: Qeshlaq-e Gharbi

Population (2016)
  - Total: 33
- Time zone: UTC+3:30 (IRST)

Qeshlaq-e Sari Quyi Mikail (Persian: قشلاق ساري قوئي ميكائيل) (Note: Also romanized as Qeshlāq-e Sārī Qūyī Mīkā'īl) is a village in Qeshlaq-e Gharbi Rural District of Borran District in Aslan Duz County, Ardabil province, Iran.

== Demographics ==
=== Population ===
At the time of the 2006 National Census, the village's population was 13 in five households, when it was in the former Aslan Duz District of Parsabad County. The following census in 2011 counted 28 people in seven households. The 2016 census measured the population as 33 in nine households.

In 2019, the district was separated from the county in the establishment of Aslan Duz County, and the rural district was transferred to the new Borran District.
