= Qeshlaq-e Qabaleh Gah Gol Aslan =

Village in Ardabil province, Iran

Qeshlaq-e Qabaleh Gah Gol Aslan Persian: قشلاق قبله گاه گل اصلان
- Village
- Country: Iran
- Province: Ardabil
- County: Aslan Duz
- District: Borran
- Rural District: Qeshlaq-e Gharbi

Population (2016)
  - Total: 17
- Time zone: UTC+3:30 (IRST)

Qeshlaq-e Qabaleh Gah Gol Aslan (Persian: قشلاق قبله گاه گل اصلان) (Note: Also romanized as Qeshlāq-e Qabaleh Gāh Gol Āṣlān) is a village in Qeshlaq-e Gharbi Rural District of Borran District in Aslan Duz County, Ardabil province, Iran.

== Demographics ==
=== Population ===
At the time of the 2006 National Census, the village's population was 22 in four households, when it was in the former Aslan Duz District of Parsabad County. The following census in 2011 counted nine people in four households. The 2016 census measured the population of the village as 17 people in five households.

In 2019, the district was separated from the county in the establishment of Aslan Duz County, and the rural district was transferred to the new Borran District.
