= Qeshlaq-e Farajollah Qadir =

Village in Ardabil province, Iran

Qeshlaq-e Farajollah Qadir Persian: قشلاق فرج اله قدير
- Village
- Location within Iran
- Coordinates: 39°23′12″N 47°36′10″E
- Country: Iran
- Province: Ardabil
- County: Aslan Duz
- District: Borran
- Rural District: Borran

Population (2016)
  - Total: 47
- Time zone: UTC+3:30 (IRST)

Qeshlaq-e Farajollah Qadir (Persian: قشلاق فرج اله قدير) (Note: Also romanized as Qeshlāq-e Farajollah Qadīr; also known as Qeshlāq-e Farajollāh) is a village in Borran Rural District of Borran District in Aslan Duz County, Ardabil province, Iran.

== Demographics ==
=== Population ===
At the time of the 2006 National Census, the village's population was 60 in 10 households, when it was in Qeshlaq-e Gharbi Rural District of the former Aslan Duz District in Parsabad County. The following census in 2011 counted 27 people in seven households. The 2016 census measured the population of the village as 47 people in 13 households.

In 2019, the district was separated from the county in the establishment of Aslan Duz County, and the rural district was transferred to the new Borran District. Qeshlaq-e Farajollah Qadir was transferred to Borran Rural District created in the district.
