= Qeshlaq-e Iman Quyi Mohammad Jalili =

Village in Ardabil province, Iran

Qeshlaq-e Iman Quyi Mohammad Jalili Persian: قشلاق ايمان قويي محمدجليلي
- Village
- Location within Iran
- Coordinates: 39°16′39″N 47°37′30″E
- Country: Iran
- Province: Ardabil
- County: Aslan Duz
- District: Borran
- Rural District: Qeshlaq-e Gharbi

Population (2016)
  - Total: 377
- Time zone: UTC+3:30 (IRST)

Qeshlaq-e Iman Quyi Mohammad Jalili (Persian: قشلاق ايمان قويي محمدجليلي) (Note: Also romanized as Qeshlāq-e Īmān Qūyī Moḩammad Jalīlī) is a village in Qeshlaq-e Gharbi Rural District of Borran District in Aslan Duz County, Ardabil province, Iran.

== Demographics ==
=== Population ===
At the time of the 2006 National Census, the village's population was 302 in 46 households, when it was in the former Aslan Duz District of Parsabad County. The following census in 2011 counted 267 people in 49 households. The 2016 census measured the population of the village as 377 people in 99 households.

In 2019, the district was separated from the county in the establishment of Aslan Duz County, and the rural district was transferred to the new Borran District.
