= Qeshlaq-e Sari Quyi Shahmar =

Village in Ardabil province, Iran

Qeshlaq-e Sari Quyi Shahmar Persian: قشلاق ساري قوئي شاه مار
- Village
- Location within Iran
- Coordinates: 39°15′36″N 47°39′37″E
- Country: Iran
- Province: Ardabil
- County: Aslan Duz
- District: Borran
- Rural District: Qeshlaq-e Gharbi

Population (2016)
  - Total: 137
- Time zone: UTC+3:30 (IRST)

Qeshlaq-e Sari Quyi Shahmar (Persian: قشلاق ساري قوئي شاه مار) (Note: Also romanized as Qeshlāq-e Sārī Qūyī Shāhmār) is a village in Qeshlaq-e Gharbi Rural District of Borran District in Aslan Duz County, Ardabil province, Iran.

== Demographics ==
=== Population ===
At the time of the 2006 National Census, the village's population was 204 in 35 households, when it was in the former Aslan Duz District of Parsabad County. The following census in 2011 counted 190 people in 46 households. The 2016 census measured the population as 137 in 43 households.

In 2019, the district was separated from the county in the establishment of Aslan Duz County, and the rural district was transferred to the new Borran District.
