= Qeshlaq-e Tak Quyi Qarah Piran-e Hazrat-e Qoli =

Village in Ardabil province, Iran

Qeshlaq-e Tak Quyi Qarah Piran-e Hazrat-e Qoli Persian: قشلاق تكقوئي قره پيران حضرتقلي
- Village
- Location within Iran
- Coordinates: 39°18′08″N 47°38′34″E
- Country: Iran
- Province: Ardabil
- County: Aslan Duz
- District: Borran
- Rural District: Qeshlaq-e Gharbi

Population (2016)
  - Total: 24
- Time zone: UTC+3:30 (IRST)

Qeshlaq-e Tak Quyi Qarah Piran-e Hazrat-e Qoli (Persian: قشلاق تكقوئي قره پيران حضرتقلي) (Note: Also romanized as Qeshlaq-e Takqui-ye Qarah Piran-e Hazrat-e Qoli and Qeshlāq-e Takqū’ī-ye Qarah Pīrān-e Ḩaẕrat-e Qolī) is a village in Qeshlaq-e Gharbi Rural District of Borran District in Aslan Duz County, Ardabil province, Iran.

== Demographics ==
=== Population ===
At the time of the 2006 National Census, the village's population was 38 in 14 households, when it was in the former Aslan Duz District of Parsabad County. The following census in 2011 counted 29 people in 10 households. The 2016 census measured the population of the village as 24 people in 10 households.

In 2019, the district was separated from the county in the establishment of Aslan Duz County, and the rural district was transferred to the new Borran District.
