= Qeshlaq-e Qabaleh Gah Allah Vardi va Paper =

Village in Ardabil province, Iran

Qeshlaq-e Qabaleh Gah Allah Vardi va Paper Persian: قشلاق قبله گاه اله وردي وپاپر
- Village
- Country: Iran
- Province: Ardabil
- County: Aslan Duz
- District: Borran
- Rural District: Qeshlaq-e Gharbi

Population (2016)
  - Total: 48
- Time zone: UTC+3:30 (IRST)

Qeshlaq-e Qabaleh Gah Allah Vardi va Paper (Persian: قشلاق قبله گاه اله وردي وپاپر) (Note: Also romanized as Qeshlāq-e Qabaleh Gāh Allah Verdī va Pāper) is a village in Qeshlaq-e Gharbi Rural District of Borran District in Aslan Duz County, Ardabil province, Iran.

== Demographics ==
=== Population ===
At the time of the 2006 National Census, the village's population was 58 in 14 households, when it was in the former Aslan Duz District of Parsabad County. The following census in 2011 counted 45 people in 13 households. The 2016 census measured the population of the village as 48 people in 17 households.

In 2019, the district was separated from the county in the establishment of Aslan Duz County, and the rural district was transferred to the new Borran District.
