= Balkan (name) =

Balkan is a Turkish origin surname. Notable people with the surname include:

== People ==
- Adele Balkan (1907–1999), American costume designer
- Enver Balkan (1902–1966), Turkish Olympic fencer
- Franco Balkan, stage name of Goran Valka (born 1983), Bosnian musical artist
- Fuat Balkan (1887–1970), Turkish Olympic fencer
- Liza Balkan (born 20th century), Canadian academic and actress
- Nihat Balkan (1921–?), Turkish Olympic fencer
- Onur Balkan (born 1996), Turkish cyclist
- Orkan Balkan (born 1987), Turkish football player
- Serkan Balkan (born 1994), Turkish cyclist

== Fictional characters ==
- Boris Balkan, one of the main characters in the movie The Ninth Gate

== See also ==
- Bolkan (surname)
