= Qeshlaq-e Sari Quyi Ahmad Khan =

Village in Ardabil province, Iran

Qeshlaq-e Sari Quyi Ahmad Khan Persian: قشلاق ساري قوئي احمدخان
- Village
- Location within Iran
- Country: Iran
- Province: Ardabil
- County: Aslan Duz
- District: Borran
- Rural District: Qeshlaq-e Gharbi

Population (2016)
  - Total: 34
- Time zone: UTC+3:30 (IRST)

Qeshlaq-e Sari Quyi Ahmad Khan (Persian: قشلاق ساري قوئي احمدخان) (Note: Also romanized as Qeshlāq-e Sārī Qūyī Aḩmad Khān) is a village in Qeshlaq-e Gharbi Rural District of Borran District in Aslan Duz County, Ardabil province, Iran.

== Demographics ==
=== Population ===
At the time of the 2006 National Census, the village's population was 74 in 15 households, when it was in the former Aslan Duz District of Parsabad County. The following census in 2011 counted 54 people in 12 households. The 2016 census measured the population as 34 in 11 households.

In 2019, the district was separated from the county in the establishment of Aslan Duz County, and the rural district was transferred to the new Borran District.
