= Qeshlaq-e Qabaleh Gah Ali Aslan =

Village in Ardabil province, Iran

Qeshlaq-e Qabaleh Gah Ali Aslan Persian: قشلاق قبله گاه علي اصلان
- Village
- Country: Iran
- Province: Ardabil
- County: Aslan Duz
- District: Borran
- Rural District: Qeshlaq-e Gharbi

Population (2016)
  - Total: 30
- Time zone: UTC+3:30 (IRST)

Qeshlaq-e Qabaleh Gah Ali Aslan (Persian: قشلاق قبله گاه علي اصلان) (Note: Also romanized as Qeshlāq-e Qabaleh Gāh ʿAlī Āṣlān) is a village in Qeshlaq-e Gharbi Rural District of Borran District in Aslan Duz County, Ardabil province, Iran.

== Demographics ==
=== Population ===
At the time of the 2006 National Census, the village's population was 25 in five households, when it was in the former Aslan Duz District of Parsabad County. The following census in 2011 counted 21 people in five households. The 2016 census measured the population of the village as 30 people in 10 households.

In 2019, the district was separated from the county in the establishment of Aslan Duz County, and the rural district was transferred to the new Borran District.
