= Qeshlaq-e Tak Quyi Qarah Piran =

Village in Ardabil province, Iran

Qeshlaq-e Tak Quyi Qarah Piran Persian: قشلاق تك قويي قره پيران
- Village
- Location within Iran
- Coordinates: 39°17′34″N 47°38′41″E
- Country: Iran
- Province: Ardabil
- County: Aslan Duz
- District: Borran
- Rural District: Qeshlaq-e Gharbi

Population (2016)
  - Total: 64
- Time zone: UTC+3:30 (IRST)

Qeshlaq-e Tak Quyi Qarah Piran (Persian: قشلاق تك قويي قره پيران) (Note: Also romanized as Qeshlāq-e Tak Qūyī Qarah Pīrān) is a village in Qeshlaq-e Gharbi Rural District of Borran District in Aslan Duz County, Ardabil province, Iran.

== Demographics ==
=== Population ===
At the time of the 2006 National Census, the village's population was 87 in 14 households, when it was in the former Aslan Duz District of Parsabad County. The following census in 2011 counted 85 people in 17 households. The 2016 census measured the population of the village as 64 people in 18 households.

In 2019, the district was separated from the county in the establishment of Aslan Duz County, and the rural district was transferred to the new Borran District.
