= Balke =

- Gender: Unisex
- Language: Norwegian; German; Old Norse

Origin
- Languages: German, Old Norse
- Meaning: German: ‘timber’, ‘beam’; Old Norse: ‘beam’, used in the sense ‘ridge’

Balke is a surname. Notable people with the surname include:

- Jasper Balke (born 1997), German politician
- Jon Balke (born 1955), Norwegian jazz pianist and composer
- Peder Balke (1804–1887), Norwegian painter
- Siegfried Balke (1902–1984), German politician
- Turid Balke (1921–2000), Norwegian actress, playwright, and artist

== See also ==
- Baalke (disambiguation)
- Balka (disambiguation)
