= Qeshlaq-e Sumuklu Mayir =

Village in Ardabil province, Iran

Qeshlaq-e Sumuklu Mayir Persian: قشلاق سوموكلومعير
- Village
- Country: Iran
- Province: Ardabil
- County: Aslan Duz
- District: Borran
- Rural District: Qeshlaq-e Gharbi

Population (2016)
  - Total: 44
- Time zone: UTC+3:30 (IRST)

Qeshlaq-e Sumuklu Mayir (Persian: قشلاق سوموكلومعير) (Note: Also romanized as Qeshlāq-e Sūmūklū Mayīr) is a village in Qeshlaq-e Gharbi Rural District of Borran District in Aslan Duz County, Ardabil province, Iran.

== Demographics ==
=== Population ===
At the time of the 2006 National Census, the village's population was 51 in 11 households, when it was in the former Aslan Duz District of Parsabad County. The following census in 2011 counted a population below the reporting threshold. The 2016 census measured the population of the village as 44 people in 12 households.

In 2019, the district was separated from the county in the establishment of Aslan Duz County, and the rural district was transferred to the new Borran District.
