= Balka (disambiguation) =

Balka is a village and seaside resort in Denmark.

Balka or Bałka may also refer to:

- Balka, Donetsk Oblast, a settlement in Ukraine
- Balka Suman (born 1983), Indian politician
- Mirosław Bałka (born 1958), Polish artist

== See also ==
- Balk (disambiguation)
- Balkan (disambiguation)
- Balke, a surname
