= Qeshlaq-e Farajollah Hajj Sarkhan =

Village in Ardabil province, Iran

Qeshlaq-e Farajollah Hajj Sarkhan Persian: قشلاق فرج اله حاج سارخان
- Village
- Location within Iran
- Coordinates: 39°23′19″N 47°34′54″E
- Country: Iran
- Province: Ardabil
- County: Aslan Duz
- District: Borran
- Rural District: Borran

Population (2016)
  - Total: 66
- Time zone: UTC+3:30 (IRST)

Qeshlaq-e Farajollah Hajj Sarkhan (Persian: قشلاق فرج اله حاج سارخان) (Note: Also romanized as Qeshlāq-e Farajollah Ḩājj Sārkhān) is a village in Borran Rural District of Borran District in Aslan Duz County, Ardabil province, Iran.

== Demographics ==
=== Population ===
At the time of the 2006 National Census, the village's population was 56 in 11 households, when it was in Qeshlaq-e Gharbi Rural District of the former Aslan Duz District in Parsabad County. The following census in 2011 counted a population below the reporting threshold. The 2016 census measured the population of the village as 66 people in 19 households.

In 2019, the district was separated from the county in the establishment of Aslan Duz County, and the rural district was transferred to the new Borran District. Qeshlaq-e Farajollah Hajj Sarkhan was transferred to Borran Rural District created in the district.
