= Choqa Kabud, Ilam =

Choqa Kabud چقاكبود
- Village
- Location within Iran
- Coordinates: 33°46′28″N 46°11′23″E
- Country: Iran
- Province: Ilam
- County: Ilam
- Bakhsh: Chavar
- Rural District: Arkavazi

Population (2006)
  - Total: 46
- Time zone: UTC+3:30 (IRST)
  - Summer (DST): UTC+4:30 (IRDT)

Choqa Kabud (Persian: چقاكبود, also Romanized as Choqā Kabūd; also known as Kālkeh) is a village in Arkavazi Rural District, Chavar District, Ilam County, Ilam Province, Iran. At the 2006 census, its population was 46, in 11 families. The village is populated by Kurds.
