= Choqa Kabud, Kermanshah =

Choqa Kabud چیاکه‌و Çîya Kew
- Village
- Location within Iran
- Coordinates: 34°24′42″N 46°55′45″E
- Country: Iran
- Province: Kermanshah
- County: Kermanshah
- Bakhsh: Central
- Rural District: Baladarband

Population (2006)
  - Total: 135
- Time zone: UTC+3:30 (IRST)
  - Summer (DST): UTC+4:30 (IRDT)

Choqa Kabud (Kurdish: چیاکه‌و ,Çîya Kew, Persian: چقاكبود, romanized: Choqā Kabūd or Cheqā Kabūd; also known as Chīa Kabūd) is a village in Baladarband Rural District, in the Central District of Kermanshah County, Kermanshah Province, Iran. At the 2006 census, its population was 135, in 34 families.
