= Mahidasht, Iran =

City in Kermanshah province, Iran

Mahidasht Persian: ماهیدشت
- City
- Location within Iran
- Coordinates: 34°16′10″N 46°48′14″E
- Country: Iran
- Province: Kermanshah
- County: Kermanshah
- District: Mahidasht

Population (2016)
  - Total: 823
- Time zone: UTC+3:30 (IRST)

Mahidasht (Persian: ماهیدشت) (Note: Also romanized as Robāţ; also known as Māhīdasht, Robāţ-e Māhī Dasht, Robāţ-e Māhīdasht, and Robaţ ‘Olyā) is a city in, and the capital of, Mahidasht District of Kermanshah County, Kermanshah province, Iran. It also serves as the administrative center for Mahidasht Rural District. It is 25 km to the southwest of the provincial capital, Kermanshah, on the main route to Eslamabad-e Gharb on road 48 (Iran).

== Demographics ==
=== Population ===
At the time of the 2006 National Census, the city's population was 996 in 248 households. The following census in 2011 counted 940 people in 265 households. The 2016 census measured the population of the city as 823 people in 252 households.

== See also ==
- Kalhor
