= Esmail Kandi, Miandoab =

Esmail Kandi اسماعيل كندي
- Village
- Location within Iran
- Coordinates: 36°54′07″N 45°59′42″E
- Country: Iran
- Province: West Azerbaijan
- County: Miandoab
- Bakhsh: Central
- Rural District: Mokriyan-e Shomali

Population (2006)
  - Total: 204
- Time zone: UTC+3:30 (IRST)
  - Summer (DST): UTC+4:30 (IRDT)

Esmail Kandi (Persian: اسماعيل كندي, also Romanized as Esmā‘īl Kandī) is a village in Mokriyan-e Shomali Rural District, in the Central District of Miandoab County, West Azerbaijan Province, Iran. At the 2006 census, its population was 204, in 47 families.
