= Baalke =

Baalke may refer to:

- Trent Baalke, General Manager of the Jacksonville Jaguars
- 6524 Baalke, an asteroid
- Baalke Slough, a lake in Valley County, Montana
