= Choqa Kabud-e Sofla =

Choqa Kabud-e Sofla چقاكبودسفلي
- Village
- Location within Iran
- Coordinates: 34°30′34″N 46°39′36″E
- Country: Iran
- Province: Kermanshah
- County: Kermanshah
- Bakhsh: Kuzaran
- Rural District: Sanjabi

Population (2006)
  - Total: 86
- Time zone: UTC+3:30 (IRST)
  - Summer (DST): UTC+4:30 (IRDT)

Choqa Kabud-e Sofla (Persian: چقاكبودسفلي, also Romanized as Choqā Kabūd-e Soflá; also known as Choqā Kabūd) is a village in Sanjabi Rural District, Kuzaran District, Kermanshah County, Kermanshah Province, Iran. At the 2006 census, its population was 86, in 20 families.
