= Margarete Balk =

German politician (1896–1974)

- Born: 4 February 1896; Gemünden am Main, Bavaria, Germany
- Died: 10 July 1974 (aged 78); Würzburg, Bavaria, Germany
- Occupations: Teacher and politician
- Political party: Christian Social Union of Bavaria

Margarete Balk (4 February 1896 – 10 July 1974) was a German teacher and politician. She was a member of the Landtag of Bavaria from 1958 to 1966.

Balk completed a teacher training in Gemünden and Aschaffenburg in 1918. Then she headed from 1921 to 1940 various children's homes and schools, among other things, on the Heuberg at Sigmaringen. From 1940 to 1945 she was a teacher at the Agricultural Vocational School of Charles city, after the Second World War from 1945 to 1948 she taught at the elementary school in Karlburg.
