= Qaleh-ye Farajollah Beyg =

Qaleh-ye Farajollah Beyg قلعه فرج الله بيگ
- Village
- Location within Iran
- Coordinates: 34°37′18″N 46°35′12″E
- Country: Iran
- Province: Kermanshah
- County: Ravansar
- Bakhsh: Central
- Rural District: Zalu Ab

Population (2006)
  - Total: 31
- Time zone: UTC+3:30 (IRST)
  - Summer (DST): UTC+4:30 (IRDT)

Qaleh-ye Farajollah Beyg (Persian: قلعه فرج الله بيگ, also Romanized as Qal‘eh-ye Farajollāh Beyk; also known as Farajollāh Beyk) is a village in Zalu Ab Rural District, in the Central District of Ravansar County, Kermanshah Province, Iran. At the 2006 census, its population was 31, in 5 families.
