= Goran Valka =

Bosnian singer, songwriter, and record producer

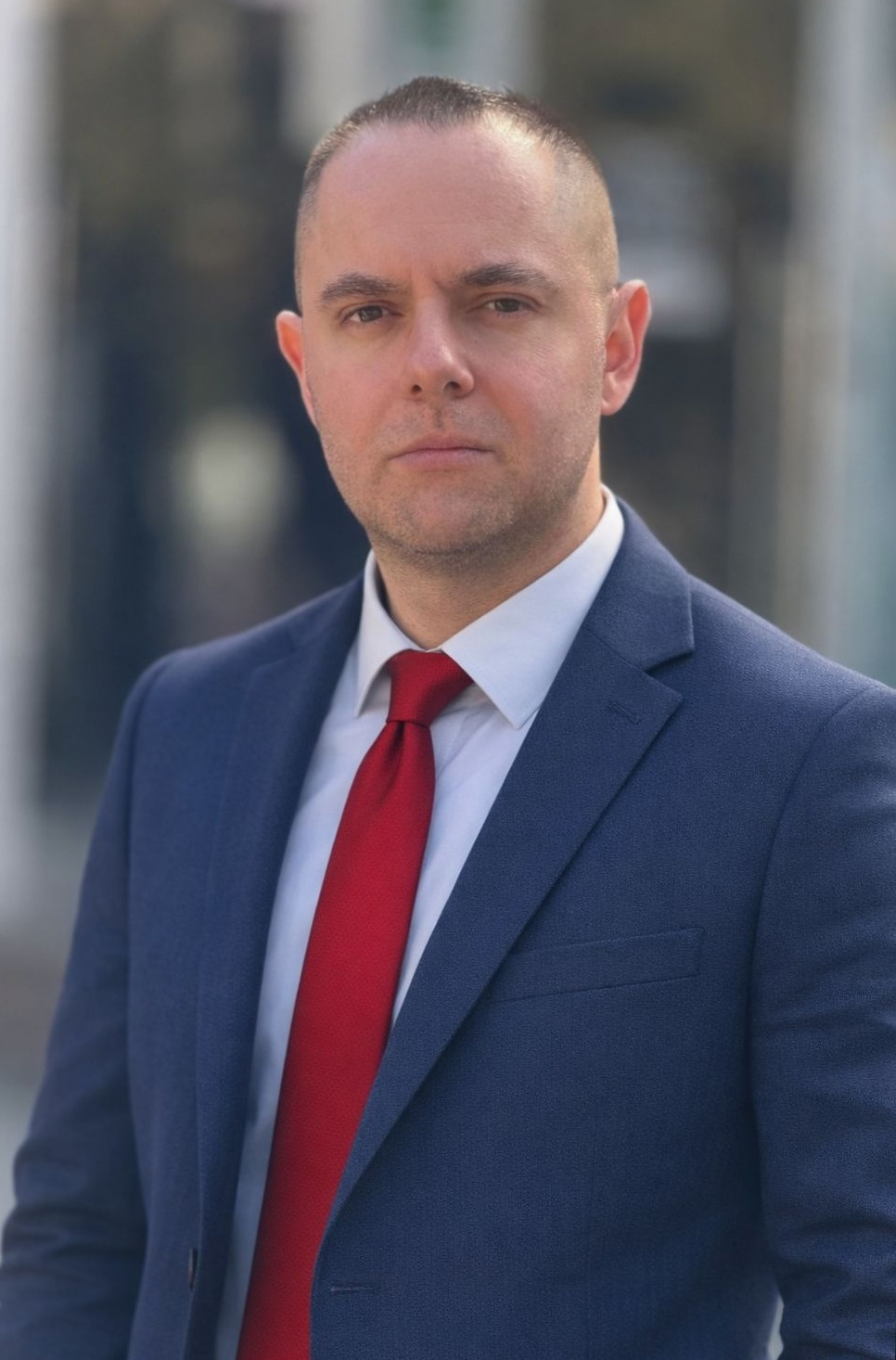

Acting President of the Management Board of the Operator for Renewable Energy Sources and Efficient Cogeneration
- Incumbent
- Assumed office April 2026

Personal details
- Born: 1 August 1983 (age 43) Sarajevo, SR Bosnia and Herzegovina, SFR Yugoslavia
- Party: Our Party
- Education: University of Sarajevo
- Occupation: Politician, energy specialist, businessman

Goran Valka (born 1 August 1983) is a Bosnian politician, energy specialist and businessman. His professional activities have included work in the fields of renewable energy, communications, management and public administration. Since April 2026, he has served as acting president of the Management Board of the Operator for Renewable Energy Sources and Efficient Cogeneration of the Federation of Bosnia and Herzegovina.

== Early life and education ==
Valka was born in Sarajevo on 1 August 1983. He completed his primary and secondary education in Sarajevo. He studied communication studies at the Faculty of Political Sciences, University of Sarajevo, where he obtained a degree in communications. He subsequently completed a second-cycle degree at the same faculty, earning a master's degree in political science.

Earlier in his career, Valka was involved in music and participated in several music and artistic projects, releasing a number of singles and music videos.

== Professional career ==
Throughout his professional career, Valka has held management and advisory positions in the private, public and academic sectors, particularly in communications, public relations, management, energy and business development.

He began his career in communications, media and public relations, where he participated in the implementation of promotional, educational and socially responsible projects in Bosnia and Herzegovina.

He served as head of public relations at the International University of Sarajevo (IUS), where he was involved in institutional communications, university promotion and media relations.

During his work in the sports sector, he participated in projects aimed at promoting sport and social responsibility, including activities carried out in cooperation with the Football Association of Bosnia and Herzegovina.

From 2021 to 2025, Valka served as executive director of eSOLAR d.o.o., where he was involved in the development of projects related to solar energy, renewable energy and energy investments.

Since April 2026, he has served as acting president of the Management Board of the Operator for Renewable Energy Sources and Efficient Cogeneration of the Federation of Bosnia and Herzegovina.

== Energy sector ==
Valka has participated in projects and initiatives related to the development of renewable energy in Bosnia and Herzegovina, including the implementation of guarantees of origin for electricity, the development of prosumer models and citizen energy, regional cooperation among energy institutions in the Western Balkans, digitalisation of the energy sector and improvements to the balancing of renewable energy sources.

He has publicly advocated for accelerating the energy transition, expanding citizen energy and making prosumer models more accessible to citizens of Bosnia and Herzegovina.

During his tenure at the Operator for Renewable Energy Sources and Efficient Cogeneration, Valka has emphasised the importance of citizen energy, transparency in incentive schemes and the modernisation of the energy sector of the Federation of Bosnia and Herzegovina.

As an energy specialist and consultant, he has participated in public discussions concerning energy transition, security of supply, the development of the natural gas market and the alignment of Bosnia and Herzegovina's energy sector with European energy practices.

== Political career ==
Valka is a member of Our Party (Naša stranka).

In 2025, Valka became a member of the Commission for Budget, Economy, Finance and Economic Affairs of the Ilidža Municipal Council.

In his public activities, Valka has advocated for greater transparency in the management of public funds, increased citizen participation in the energy sector, and the development of renewable energy. He has also publicly supported accelerating the energy transition and expanding the prosumer model in the Federation of Bosnia and Herzegovina.

== Public appointments ==
In addition to his work in the energy sector, Valka previously served as a member of the Management Board of the Federal Institute for Pension and Disability Insurance of the Federation of Bosnia and Herzegovina.

Since April 2026, he has served as acting president of the Management Board of the Operator for Renewable Energy Sources and Efficient Cogeneration of the Federation of Bosnia and Herzegovina.

== Public activities ==
Valka has participated in professional conferences, public events and media interviews focused on energy transition, renewable energy, citizen energy and sustainable development in Bosnia and Herzegovina and the wider region.
