= Balkan, Kentucky =

Unincorporated community in Kentucky, United States

Balkan
- Unincorporated community
- Location within the state of Kentucky Balkan (the United States)
- Coordinates: 36°45′33″N 83°32′40″W
- Country: United States
- State: Kentucky
- County: Bell
- Elevation: 1,266 ft (386 m)
- Time zone: UTC-5 (Eastern (EST))
  - Summer (DST): UTC-4 (EST)
- ZIP codes: 40913
- GNIS feature ID: 507443

Balkan is an unincorporated community in Bell County, in the U.S. state of Kentucky.

== History ==
A post office was established at Balkan in 1912, and remained in operation until 1982. It was named after the Balkans, in Southeast Europe, the native land of many of the early settlers in this mining community.
