= Esmail Kandi, Baruq =

Esmail Kandi اسماعيل كندي
- Village
- Location within Iran
- Coordinates: 36°58′33″N 46°27′14″E
- Country: Iran
- Province: West Azerbaijan
- County: Miandoab
- Bakhsh: Baruq
- Rural District: Ajorluy-ye Gharbi

Population (2006)
  - Total: 206
- Time zone: UTC+3:30 (IRST)
  - Summer (DST): UTC+4:30 (IRDT)

Esmail Kandi (Persian: اسماعيل كندي, also Romanized as Esmā‘īl Kandī) is a village in Ajorluy-ye Gharbi Rural District, Baruq District, Miandoab County, West Azerbaijan Province, Iran. At the 2006 census, its population was 206, in 60 families.
