= Cheqa Kabud, Eslamabad-e Gharb =

Cheqa Kabud چقاكبود
- Village
- Location within Iran
- Coordinates: 33°58′58″N 46°40′00″E
- Country: Iran
- Province: Kermanshah
- County: Eslamabad-e Gharb
- Bakhsh: Central
- Rural District: Howmeh-ye Jonubi

Population (2006)
  - Total: 1,601
- Time zone: UTC+3:30 (IRST)
  - Summer (DST): UTC+4:30 (IRDT)

Cheqa Kabud (Persian: چقاكبود, also Romanized as Cheqā Kabūd; also known as Chega Kabūd, Cheqād Kabūd, and Cheqā Kabūd-e Seyāh Seyāh) is a village in Howmeh-ye Jonubi Rural District, in the Central District of Eslamabad-e Gharb County, Kermanshah Province, Iran. At the 2006 census, its population was 1,601, in 341 families.
