= Gowzalli, West Azerbaijan =

Gowzalli گوزلي
- Village
- Location within Iran
- Coordinates: 36°57′45″N 46°44′49″E
- Country: Iran
- Province: West Azerbaijan
- County: Miandoab
- Bakhsh: Baruq
- Rural District: Ajorluy-ye Sharqi

Population (2006)
  - Total: 53
- Time zone: UTC+3:30 (IRST)
  - Summer (DST): UTC+4:30 (IRDT)

Gowzalli (Persian: گوزلي, also Romanized as Gowzallī and Gowzlī) is a village in Ajorluy-ye Sharqi Rural District, Baruq District, Miandoab County, West Azerbaijan Province, Iran. At the 2006 census, its population was 53, in 12 families.
