= Choqa Kabud-e Olya =

Choqa Kabud-e Olya چقاكبودعليا
- Village
- Location within Iran
- Coordinates: 34°30′36″N 46°39′32″E
- Country: Iran
- Province: Kermanshah
- County: Kermanshah
- Bakhsh: Kuzaran
- Rural District: Sanjabi

Population (2006)
  - Total: 160
- Time zone: UTC+3:30 (IRST)
  - Summer (DST): UTC+4:30 (IRDT)

Choqa Kabud-e Olya (Persian: چقاكبودعليا, also Romanized as Choqā Kabūd-e 'Olyā and Choqākabūd-e 'Olyā) is a village in Sanjabi Rural District, Kuzaran District, Kermanshah County, Kermanshah province, Iran. At the 2006 census, its population was 160, in 32 families.
