= Harold Balk =

New Zealand footballer

Personal information
- Full name: Harold Carl Reginald Balk
- Date of birth: c. 1898
- Place of birth: New Zealand
- Date of death: 1970 (aged 72)

Senior career*
Years	Team	Apps	(Gls)
- Maori Hill

International career
1923–1927	New Zealand	5	(0)
- * Club domestic league appearances and goals

Harold Balk (c. 1898–1970) was an association football player who represented New Zealand at international level.

Balk made his full All Whites debut in a 1–2 loss to Australia on 9 July 1923 and ended his international playing career with five A-international caps to his credit, his final cap an appearance in a 1–2 loss to Canada on 2 July 1927.
