= FK Balkan =

FK Balkan may refer to:

- FK Balkan Mirijevo, Mirijevo, Belgrade, Serbia, formerly known as OFK Balkan Mirijevo and FK Balkan Bukovica
- FK Balkan Skopje, North Macedonia
- FC Balkan Botevgrad (FK Balkan Botevgrad), Botevgrad, Bulgaria

== See also ==
- Nebitçi FT, Balkanabat, Turkmenistan, formerly known as Balkan FK
- FBK Balkan, Malmö, Sweden
- FC Balkany Zorya (FK Balkany Zorya), Zorya, Ukraine
- KF Ballkani (FC Ballkani), Suharekë, Kosovo
