= Balkan (village) =

Coordinates: 41°46′2″N 25°34′19″E

- Village
- Interactive map of Balkan
- Country: Bulgaria
- Province: Haskovo Province
- Municipality: Stambolovo
- Time zone: UTC+2 (EET)
  - Summer (DST): UTC+3 (EEST)

Balkan is a village in Stambolovo Municipality, in Haskovo Province, in southern Bulgaria.
