= Esmail Kandi, Khoy =

Esmail Kandi اسمعيل كندي
- Village
- Location within Iran
- Coordinates: 38°30′51″N 44°59′33″E
- Country: Iran
- Province: West Azerbaijan
- County: Khoy
- Bakhsh: Central
- Rural District: Qarah Su

Population (2006)
  - Total: 37
- Time zone: UTC+3:30 (IRST)
  - Summer (DST): UTC+4:30 (IRDT)

Esmail Kandi (Persian: اسمعيل كندي, also Romanized as Esmā‘īl Kandī) is a village in Qarah Su Rural District, in the Central District of Khoy County, West Azerbaijan Province, Iran. At the 2006 census, its population was 37, in 8 families.
