= Patiabad, Kermanshah =

Patiabad پتي اباد
- Village
- Location within Iran
- Coordinates: 34°28′06″N 46°48′44″E
- Country: Iran
- Province: Kermanshah
- County: Kermanshah
- Bakhsh: Central
- Rural District: Baladarband

Population (2006)
  - Total: 58
- Time zone: UTC+3:30 (IRST)
  - Summer (DST): UTC+4:30 (IRDT)

Patiabad (Persian: پتي اباد, also Romanized as Patīābād; also known as Fārājulābak, Kūr Bolāgh-e Deh-e Farajollāh, Kūr Bolāgh-e Farajollāh Beygī, Kūr Bolāgh-e Patīābād, Kūr Bolāgh-e Soflá, Kūrbolāgh Parīābād, and Kurbulāk) is a village in Baladarband Rural District, in the Central District of Kermanshah County, Kermanshah Province, Iran. At the 2006 census, its population was 58, in 14 families.
