= Balck =

Balck is a surname. Notable people with the surname include:

- Heike Balck (born 1970), retired German high jumper
- Hermann Balck (1893–1982), general in Nazi Germany's Wehrmacht
- Viktor Balck (1844–1928), Swedish officer and sports personality, and one of the original members of the International Olympic Committee
- William Balck (1858–1924), general in German Army

== See also ==
- Balk
- Black
