= Chaqa Narges Rural District =

Rural district in Kermanshah province, Iran

Chaqa Narges Rural District Persian: دهستان چقا نرگس
- Rural District
- Location within Iran
- Coordinates: 34°20′34″N 46°44′01″E
- Country: Iran
- Province: Kermanshah
- County: Kermanshah
- District: Mahidasht
- Capital: Chaqa Narges

Population (2016)
  - Total: 6,098
- Time zone: UTC+3:30 (IRST)

Chaqa Narges Rural District (Persian: دهستان چقا نرگس) is in Mahidasht District of Kermanshah County, Kermanshah province, Iran. Its capital is the village of Chaqa Narges.

== Demographics ==
=== Population ===
At the time of the 2006 National Census, the rural district's population was 7,296 in 1,592 households. There were 6,507 inhabitants in 1,651 households at the following census of 2011. The 2016 census measured the population of the rural district as 6,098 in 1,766 households. The most populous of its 46 villages was Chaqa Narges, with 592 people.
