= Mahidasht Rural District =

Rural district in Kermanshah province, Iran

Mahidasht Rural District Persian: دهستان ماهيدشت
- Rural District
- Location within Iran
- Coordinates: 34°14′43″N 46°51′03″E
- Country: Iran
- Province: Kermanshah
- County: Kermanshah
- District: Mahidasht
- Capital: Robat

Population (2016)
  - Total: 11,707
- Time zone: UTC+3:30 (IRST)

Mahidasht Rural District (Persian: دهستان ماهيدشت) is in Mahidasht District of Kermanshah County, Kermanshah province, Iran. It is administered from the city of Robat.

== Demographics ==
=== Population ===
At the time of the 2006 National Census, the rural district's population was 13,107 in 3,045 households. There were 12,955 inhabitants in 3,419 households at the following census of 2011. The 2016 census measured the population of the rural district as 11,707 in 3,334 households. The most populous of its 90 villages was Cheshmeh Sefid, with 933 people.
