= Qeshlaq-e Gharbi Rural District =

Rural district in Ardabil province, Iran

Qeshlaq-e Gharbi Rural District Persian: دهستان قشلاق غربی
- Rural District
- Location within Iran
- Coordinates: 39°16′N 47°36′E
- Country: Iran
- Province: Ardabil
- County: Aslan Duz
- District: Borran
- Established: 1992
- Capital: Dalik Yarqan

Population (2016)
  - Total: 8,449
- Time zone: UTC+3:30 (IRST)

Qeshlaq-e Gharbi Rural District (Persian: دهستان قشلاق غربی) is in Borran District of Aslan Duz County, Ardabil province, Iran. Its capital is the village of Dalik Yarqan. The previous capital of the rural district was the village of Borran-e Olya, now a city.

== Demographics ==
=== Population ===
At the time of the 2006 National Census, the rural district's population (as a part of the former Aslan Duz District in Parsabad County) was 8,184 in 1,551 households. There were 6,910 inhabitants in 1,643 households at the following census of 2011. The 2016 census measured the population of the rural district as 8,449 in 2,425 households. The most populous of its 68 villages was Borran-e Olya (now a city), with 1,508 people.

In 2019, the district was separated from the county in the establishment of Aslan Duz County, and the rural district was transferred to the new Borran District.

=== Other villages in the rural district ===
- Amir Khanlu
- Duh Darrehsi
- Gowzalli
- Kol Tappeh
- Qeshlaq-e Iman Quyi Mashhad Ali
- Qeshlaq-e Iman Quyi Mohammad Jalili
- Qeshlaq-e Qabaleh Gah Abbas Ali
- Qeshlaq-e Qabaleh Gah Ali Aslan
- Qeshlaq-e Qabaleh Gah Allah Vardi va Paper
- Qeshlaq-e Qabaleh Gah Gol Aslan
- Qeshlaq-e Qanbarlu Hajj Mohammad Hasan
- Qeshlaq-e Qanbarlu Rostam Qanbarlui-ye Vosta
- Qeshlaq-e Qanbarlui-ye Olya
- Qeshlaq-e Sari Quyi Ahmad Khan
- Qeshlaq-e Sari Quyi Mikail
- Qeshlaq-e Sari Quyi Shahmar
- Qeshlaq-e Sumuklu Heydar
- Qeshlaq-e Sumuklu Mayir
- Qeshlaq-e Tak Quyi Matlab va Ali Khan
- Qeshlaq-e Tak Quyi Qarah Piran
- Qeshlaq-e Tak Quyi Qarah Piran-e Hazrat-e Qoli
- Sari Qeshlaq
- Taqi Kandi
