= Mahidasht District =

District in Kermanshah province, Iran

Mahidasht District Persian: بخش مایەشت
- District
- Location within Iran
- Coordinates: 34°17′11″N 46°50′03″E
- Country: Iran
- Province: Kermanshah
- County: Kermanshah
- Capital: Robat

Population (2016)
  - Total: 18,628
- Time zone: UTC+3:30 (IRST)

Mahidasht District (Persian: بخش مایەشت) is in Kermanshah County, Kermanshah province, Iran. Its capital is the city of Robat.

== Demographics ==
=== Population ===
At the time of the 2006 National Census, the district's population was 21,399 in 4,885 households. The following census in 2011 counted 20,402 people in 5,335 households. The 2016 census measured the population of the district as 18,628 inhabitants in 5,352 households.

=== Administrative divisions ===
Mahidasht District Population
Administrative Divisions	2006	2011	2016
Chaqa Narges RD	7,296	6,507	6,098
Mahidasht RD	13,107	12,955	11,707
Robat (city)	996	940	823
Total	21,399	20,402	18,628
RD = Rural District

== See also ==
- Kalhor
