= Borran District =

District in Ardabil province, Iran

Borran District Persian: بخش بران
- District
- Location within Iran
- Coordinates: 39°19′N 47°36′E
- Country: Iran
- Province: Ardabil
- County: Aslan Duz
- Established: 2019
- Capital: Borran-e Olya
- Time zone: UTC+3:30 (IRST)

Borran District (Persian: بخش بران) is in Aslan Duz County, Ardabil province, Iran. Its capital is the city of Borran-e Olya, whose population at the time of the 2016 National Census was 1,508 people in 451 households.

== History ==
In 2019, Aslan Duz District was separated from Parsabad County in the establishment of Aslan Duz County, which was divided into two districts of two rural districts each, with Aslan Duz as its capital and only city at the time. The village of Borran-e Olya was converted to a city in 2023.

== Demographics ==
=== Administrative divisions ===
Borran District
Administrative Divisions
Borran RD
Qeshlaq-e Gharbi RD
Borran-e Olya (city) (Note: Became a city after the 2016 census)
RD = Rural District
