= Qeshlaq-e Hajj =

Qeshlaq-e Hajj (Persian: قشلاق حاج) may refer to several places in Iran:

- Qeshlaq-e Hajj Ali Barat
- Qeshlaq-e Hajj Ali Qoli Abdol
- Qeshlaq-e Hajj Ali Qoli Ayaz
- Qeshlaq-e Hajj Ali Qoli Jafar
- Qeshlaq-e Hajj Ali Qoli Jelal va Khan Aqa
- Qeshlaq-e Hajj Ali Qoli Jelal va Khan Aqa
- Qeshlaq-e Hajj Almas Khan
- Qeshlaq-e Hajj Aman
- Qeshlaq-e Hajj Amir Forman
- Qeshlaq-e Hajj Amir Mashhadi Safer
- Qeshlaq-e Hajj Amir Moharram
- Qeshlaq-e Hajj Aqa Nasir Owgholu
- Qeshlaq-e Hajj Aqaqoli
- Qeshlaq-e Hajj Aspar Kandi
- Qeshlaq-e Hajj Dalan Khan Hoseyn Khodayar
- Qeshlaq-e Hajj Dowlat Savad
- Qeshlaq-e Hajj Dowlat Yadollah
- Qeshlaq-e Hajj Fathali
- Qeshlaq-e Hajj Fathali Mansur
- Qeshlaq-e Hajj Hashem-e Nusrat
- Qeshlaq-e Hajj Heydar Farman
- Qeshlaq-e Hajj Heydar Gol Ahmad
- Qeshlaq-e Hajj Hoseyn
- Qeshlaq-e Hajj Hoseyn Khan
- Qeshlaq-e Hajj Khan Hoseyn Samid
- Qeshlaq-e Hajj Lataf Ali
- Qeshlaq-e Hajj Mahmud
- Qeshlaq-e Hajj Miser Kandi
- Qeshlaq-e Hajj Shirin Arshad
- Qeshlaq-e Hajj Shirin Mosib
- Qeshlaq-e Hajj Taleb
- Qeshlaq-e Hajj Tumar Hajj Jamshid Shahbazi
