= Qeshlaq-e Hajji =

Qeshlaq-e Hajji (Persian: قشلاق حاجي) may refer to several places in Iran:

- Qeshlaq-e Hajji Abbas
- Qeshlaq-e Hajji Abish Hajj Rahim
- Qeshlaq-e Hajji Allahverdi
- Qeshlaq-e Hajji Avaz
- Qeshlaq-e Hajji Ayman Kandi-ye Olya
- Qeshlaq-e Hajji Balakhan
- Qeshlaq-e Hajji Bayandar
- Qeshlaq-e Hajji Dowlat Badar
- Qeshlaq-e Hajji Gholam
- Qeshlaq-e Hajji Hasan, Ardabil
- Qeshlaq-e Hajji Hasan, West Azerbaijan
- Qeshlaq-e Hajji Hasan Hajj Eslam
- Qeshlaq-e Hajji Heydar Havar
- Qeshlaq-e Hajji Panjalu
- Qeshlaq-e Hajji Qujakhan
- Qeshlaq-e Hajji Samid
- Qeshlaq-e Hajji Savad
- Qeshlaq-e Hajji Shahab
- Qeshlaq-e Hajji Siab
