= Qeshlaq-e Tumar Hajj Sad =

Village in Ardabil province, Iran

Qeshlaq-e Tumar Hajj Sad Persian: قشلاق تومارحاج سعد
- Village
- Country: Iran
- Province: Ardabil
- County: Parsabad
- District: Eslamabad
- Rural District: Shahrak

Population (2016)
  - Total: 169
- Time zone: UTC+3:30 (IRST)

Qeshlaq-e Tumar Hajj Sad (Persian: قشلاق تومارحاج سعد) (Note: Also romanized as Qeshlāq-e Tūmār Ḩājj Saʿd) is a village in Shahrak Rural District of Eslamabad District in Parsabad County, Ardabil province, Iran.

== Demographics ==
=== Population ===
At the time of the 2006 National Census, the village's population was 161 in 34 households, when it was in Qeshlaq-e Shomali Rural District (Note: Renamed Owltan Rural District) of the Central District. The following census in 2011 counted 150 people in 39 households. The 2016 census measured the population of the village as 169 people in 50 households, by which time villages had been separated from the rural district in the formation of Eslamabad District. Qeshlaq-e Tumar Hajj Sad was transferred to Shahrak Rural District created in the new district.
