= Qeshlaq-e Babakhan =

Village in Ardabil province, Iran

Qeshlaq-e Babakhan Persian: قشلاق باباخان
- Village
- Country: Iran
- Province: Ardabil
- County: Parsabad
- District: Eslamabad
- Rural District: Shahrak

Population (2016)
  - Total: 25
- Time zone: UTC+3:30 (IRST)

Qeshlaq-e Babakhan (Persian: قشلاق باباخان) (Note: Also romanized as Qeshlāq-e Bābākhān) is a village in Shahrak Rural District of Eslamabad District in Parsabad County, Ardabil province, Iran.

== Demographics ==
=== Population ===
At the time of the 2006 National Census, the village's population was 25 in seven households, when it was in Qeshlaq-e Shomali Rural District (Note: Renamed Owltan Rural District) of the Central District. The following census in 2011 counted 27 people in five households. The 2016 census measured the population of the village as 25 people in nine households, by which time villages had been separated from the rural district in the formation of Eslamabad District. Qeshlaq-e Babakhan was transferred to Shahrak Rural District created in the new district.
