= Qeshlaq-e Qaravgholi Jabar =

Village in Ardabil province, Iran

Qeshlaq-e Qaravgholi Jabar Persian: قشلاق قراوغلي جبار
- Village
- Location within Iran
- Coordinates: 39°30′36″N 47°43′08″E
- Country: Iran
- Province: Ardabil
- County: Parsabad
- District: Eslamabad
- Rural District: Shahrak

Population (2016)
  - Total: 113
- Time zone: UTC+3:30 (IRST)

Qeshlaq-e Qaravgholi Jabar (Persian: قشلاق قراوغلي جبار) (Note: Also romanized as Qeshlāq-e Qarāvgholī Jabār) is a village in Shahrak Rural District of Eslamabad District in Parsabad County, Ardabil province, Iran.

== Demographics ==
=== Population ===
At the time of the 2006 National Census, the village's population was 102 in 19 households, when it was in Qeshlaq-e Shomali Rural District (Note: Renamed Owltan Rural District) of the Central District. The following census in 2011 counted 100 people in 24 households. The 2016 census measured the population of the village as 113 people in 33 households, by which time villages had been separated from the rural district in the formation of Eslamabad District. Qeshlaq-e Qaravgholi Jabar was transferred to Shahrak Rural District created in the new district.
