= Qitranlu Soltani =

Village in Ardabil province, Iran

Qitranlu Soltani Persian: قيطرانلوسلطاني
- Village
- Location within Iran
- Coordinates: 39°30′45″N 47°43′29″E
- Country: Iran
- Province: Ardabil
- County: Parsabad
- District: Eslamabad
- Rural District: Shahrak

Population (2016)
  - Total: 226
- Time zone: UTC+3:30 (IRST)

Qitranlu Soltani (Persian: قيطرانلوسلطاني) (Note: Also romanized as Qīṭrānlū Solṭānī) is a village in Shahrak Rural District of Eslamabad District in Parsabad County, Ardabil province, Iran.

== Demographics ==
=== Population ===
At the time of the 2006 National Census, the village's population was 258 in 53 households, when it was in Qeshlaq-e Shomali Rural District (Note: Renamed Owltan Rural District) of the Central District. The following census in 2011 counted 199 people in 50 households. The 2016 census measured the population of the village as 226 people in 71 households, by which time villages had been separated from the rural district in the formation of Eslamabad District. Qitranlu Soltani was transferred to Shahrak Rural District created in the new district.
