= Qeshlaq-e Ayyub Gikalu =

Village in Ardabil province, Iran

Qeshlaq-e Ayyub Gikalu Persian: قشلاق ايوب گيكلو
- Village
- Location within Iran
- Coordinates: 39°29′58″N 47°40′34″E
- Country: Iran
- Province: Ardabil
- County: Parsabad
- District: Eslamabad
- Rural District: Shahrak

Population (2016)
  - Total: 27
- Time zone: UTC+3:30 (IRST)

Qeshlaq-e Ayyub Gikalu (Persian: قشلاق ايوب گيكلو) (Note: Also romanized as Qeshlāq-e Āyyūb Gīkalū) is a village in Shahrak Rural District of Eslamabad District in Parsabad County, Ardabil province, Iran.

== Demographics ==
=== Population ===
At the time of the 2006 National Census, the village's population was 47 in 13 households, when it was in Qeshlaq-e Shomali Rural District (Note: Renamed Owltan Rural District) of the Central District. The following census in 2011 counted 29 people in eight households. The 2016 census measured the population of the village as 27 people in eight households, by which time villages had been separated from the rural district in the formation of Eslamabad District. Qeshlaq-e Ayyub Gikalu was transferred to Shahrak Rural District created in the new district.
