= Qeshlaq-e Hajj Aymanlu Mahteman =

Village in Ardabil province, Iran

Qeshlaq-e Hajj Aymanlu Mahteman Persian: قشلاق حاج ايمانلومحتمن
- Village
- Location within Iran
- Coordinates: 39°30′36″N 47°42′53″E
- Country: Iran
- Province: Ardabil
- County: Parsabad
- District: Eslamabad
- Rural District: Shahrak

Population (2016)
  - Total: 192
- Time zone: UTC+3:30 (IRST)

Qeshlaq-e Hajj Aymanlu Mahteman (Persian: قشلاق حاج ايمانلومحتمن) (Note: Also romanized as Qeshlāq-e Ḩājj Aymānlū Maḥteman) is a village in Shahrak Rural District of Eslamabad District in Parsabad County, Ardabil province, Iran.

== Demographics ==
=== Population ===
At the time of the 2006 National Census, the village's population was 242 in 47 households, when it was in Qeshlaq-e Shomali Rural District (Note: Renamed Owltan Rural District) of the Central District. The following census in 2011 counted 241 people in 50 households. The 2016 census measured the population of the village as 192 people in 50 households, by which time villages had been separated from the rural district in the formation of Eslamabad District. Qeshlaq-e Hajj Aymanlu Mahteman was transferred to Shahrak Rural District created in the new district.
