= Ebrahim Kandi-ye Vosta =

Village in Ardabil province, Iran

Ebrahim Kandi-ye Vosta Persian: ابراهيم كندي وسطي
- Village
- Location within Iran
- Coordinates: 39°31′49″N 47°47′05″E
- Country: Iran
- Province: Ardabil
- County: Parsabad
- District: Eslamabad
- Rural District: Shahrak

Population (2016)
  - Total: 13
- Time zone: UTC+3:30 (IRST)

Ebrahim Kandi-ye Vosta (Persian: ابراهيم كندي وسطي) (Note: Also romanized as Ebrāhīm Kandī-ye Vosţá; also known as Ebrāhīm Kandī-ye Shomāreh-ye Do) is a village in Shahrak Rural District of Eslamabad District in Parsabad County, Ardabil province, Iran.

== Demographics ==
=== Population ===
At the time of the 2006 National Census, the village's population was 30 in six households, when it was in Qeshlaq-e Shomali Rural District (Note: Renamed Owltan Rural District) of the Central District. The following census in 2011 counted 20 people in six households. The 2016 census measured the population of the village as 13 people in four households, by which time villages had been separated from the rural district in the formation of Eslamabad District. Ebrahim Kandi-ye Vosta was transferred to Shahrak Rural District created in the new district.
