= Khalil Kandi, Parsabad =

Village in Ardabil province, Iran

Khalil Kandi Persian: خليل كندي
- Village
- Location within Iran
- Coordinates: 39°33′17″N 47°38′17″E
- Country: Iran
- Province: Ardabil
- County: Parsabad
- District: Eslamabad
- Rural District: Eslamabad

Population (2016)
  - Total: 66
- Time zone: UTC+3:30 (IRST)

Khalil Kandi (Persian: خليل كندي) (Note: Also romanized as Khalīl Kandī; also known as Maḥtesham Kandī) is a village in Eslamabad Rural District of Eslamabad District in Parsabad County, Ardabil province, Iran.

== Demographics ==
=== Population ===
At the time of the 2006 National Census, the village's population was 73 in 18 households, when it was in Qeshlaq-e Shomali Rural District (Note: Renamed Owltan Rural District) of the Central District. The following census in 2011 counted 82 people in 23 households. The 2016 census measured the population of the village as 64 people in 20 households, by which time the village had been separated from the district in the formation of Eslamabad District. Khalil Kandi was transferred to Eslamabad Rural District created in the new district.
