= Hajj Hasan Kandi =

Village in Ardabil province, Iran

Hajj Hasan Kandi Persian: حاج حسن كندي
- Village
- Location within Iran
- Coordinates: 39°32′01″N 47°37′21″E
- Country: Iran
- Province: Ardabil
- County: Parsabad
- District: Eslamabad
- Rural District: Eslamabad

Population (2016)
  - Total: 172
- Time zone: UTC+3:30 (IRST)

Hajj Hasan Kandi (Persian: حاج حسن كندي) (Note: Also romanized as Ḩājj Ḩasan Kandī) is a village in Eslamabad Rural District of Eslamabad District in Parsabad County, Ardabil province, Iran.

== Demographics ==
=== Population ===
At the time of the 2006 National Census, the village's population was 232 in 53 households, when it was in Qeshlaq-e Shomali Rural District (Note: Renamed Owltan Rural District) of the Central District. The following census in 2011 counted 207 people in 58 households. The 2016 census measured the population of the village as 172 people in 54 households, by which time the village had been separated from the district in the formation of Eslamabad District. Hajj Hasan Kandi was transferred to Eslamabad Rural District created in the new district.
