= Qeshlaq-e Hajj Tumar Hajj Jamshid Shahbazi =

Village in Ardabil province, Iran

Qeshlaq-e Hajj Tumar Hajj Jamshid Shahbazi Persian: قشلاق حاج تومارحاج جمشيدشهبازي
- Village
- Country: Iran
- Province: Ardabil
- County: Parsabad
- District: Eslamabad
- Rural District: Shahrak

Population (2016)
  - Total: 161
- Time zone: UTC+3:30 (IRST)

Qeshlaq-e Hajj Tumar Hajj Jamshid Shahbazi (Persian: قشلاق حاج تومارحاج جمشيدشهبازي) (Note: Also romanized as Qeshlāq-e Ḩājj Tūmār Ḩājj Jamshīd Shahbāzī) is a village in Shahrak Rural District of Eslamabad District in Parsabad County, Ardabil province, Iran.

== Demographics ==
=== Population ===
At the time of the 2006 National Census, the village's population was 169 in 32 households, when it was in Qeshlaq-e Shomali Rural District (Note: Renamed Owltan Rural District) of the Central District. The following census in 2011 counted 170 people in 47 households. The 2016 census measured the population of the village as 161 people in 49 households, by which time villages had been separated from the rural district in the formation of Eslamabad District. Qeshlaq-e Hajj Tumar Hajj Jamshid Shahbazi was transferred to Shahrak Rural District created in the new district.
