= Qeshlaq-e Mehr Ali Kandi =

Village in Ardabil province, Iran

Qeshlaq-e Mehr Ali Kandi Persian: قشلاق مهرعلي كندئ
- Village
- Country: Iran
- Province: Ardabil
- County: Parsabad
- District: Eslamabad
- Rural District: Shahrak

Population (2016)
  - Total: 24
- Time zone: UTC+3:30 (IRST)

Qeshlaq-e Mehr Ali Kandi (Persian: قشلاق مهرعلي كندئ) (Note: Also romanized as Qeshlāq-e Mehr ʿAlī Kandī) is a village in Shahrak Rural District of Eslamabad District in Parsabad County, Ardabil province, Iran.

== Demographics ==
=== Population ===
At the time of the 2006 National Census, the village's population was 28 in seven households, when it was in Qeshlaq-e Shomali Rural District (Note: Renamed Owltan Rural District) of the Central District. The following census in 2011 counted 33 people in eight households. The 2016 census measured the population of the village as 24 people in seven households, by which time villages had been separated from the rural district in the formation of Eslamabad District. Qeshlaq-e Mehr Ali Kandi was transferred to Shahrak Rural District created in the new district.
