= Qaravgholi Ayibi =

Village in Ardabil province, Iran

Qaravgholi Ayibi Persian: قراوغلي ايبي
- Village
- Country: Iran
- Province: Ardabil
- County: Parsabad
- District: Eslamabad
- Rural District: Shahrak

Population (2016)
  - Total: 101
- Time zone: UTC+3:30 (IRST)

Qaravgholi Ayibi (Persian: قراوغلي ايبي) (Note: Also romanized as Qaravaghli Ayibi and Qarāvaghlī Āyībī) is a village in Shahrak Rural District of Eslamabad District in Parsabad County, Ardabil province, Iran.

== Demographics ==
=== Population ===
At the time of the 2006 National Census, the village's population was 116 in 23 households, when it was in Qeshlaq-e Shomali Rural District (Note: Renamed Owltan Rural District) of the Central District. The following census in 2011 counted 102 people in 30 households. The 2016 census measured the population of the village as 101 people in 30 households, by which time villages had been separated from the rural district in the formation of Eslamabad District. Qaravgholi Ayibi was transferred to Shahrak Rural District created in the new district.
