= Qeshlaq-e Malek Kandi =

Village in Ardabil province, Iran

Qeshlaq-e Malek Kandi Persian: قشلاق ملك كندي
- Village
- Location within Iran
- Coordinates: 39°31′10″N 47°44′53″E
- Country: Iran
- Province: Ardabil
- County: Parsabad
- District: Eslamabad
- Rural District: Shahrak

Population (2016)
  - Total: 150
- Time zone: UTC+3:30 (IRST)

Qeshlaq-e Malek Kandi (Persian: قشلاق ملك كندي) (Note: Also romanized as Qeshlāq-e Malek Kandī) is a village in Shahrak Rural District of Eslamabad District in Parsabad County, Ardabil province, Iran.

== Demographics ==
=== Population ===
At the time of the 2006 National Census, the village's population was 197 in 45 households, when it was in Qeshlaq-e Shomali Rural District (Note: Renamed Owltan Rural District) of the Central District. The following census in 2011 counted a population of 150 people in 42 households. The 2016 census measured the population of the village as 150 people in 46 households, by which time villages had been separated from the rural district in the formation of Eslamabad District. Qeshlaq-e Malek Kandi was transferred to Shahrak Rural District created in the new district.
