= Tumaraqa Khan =

Village in Ardabil province, Iran

Tumaraqa Khan Persian: توماراقاخان
- Village
- Country: Iran
- Province: Ardabil
- County: Parsabad
- District: Eslamabad
- Rural District: Shahrak

Population (2016)
  - Total: 264
- Time zone: UTC+3:30 (IRST)

Tumaraqa Khan (Persian: توماراقاخان) (Note: Also romanized as Tūmārāqā Khān) is a village in Shahrak Rural District of Eslamabad District in Parsabad County, Ardabil province, Iran.

== Demographics ==
=== Population ===
At the time of the 2006 National Census, the village's population was 286 in 58 households, when it was in Qeshlaq-e Shomali Rural District (Note: Renamed Owltan Rural District) of the Central District. The following census in 2011 counted 244 people in 68 households. The 2016 census measured the population of the village as 264 people in 72 households, by which time villages had been separated from the rural district in the formation of Eslamabad District. Tumaraqa Khan was transferred to Shahrak Rural District created in the new district.
