= Qeshlaq-e Hatem =

Village in Ardabil province, Iran

Qeshlaq-e Hatem Persian: قشلاق حاتم
- Village
- Country: Iran
- Province: Ardabil
- County: Parsabad
- District: Eslamabad
- Rural District: Shahrak

Population (2016)
  - Total: 33
- Time zone: UTC+3:30 (IRST)

Qeshlaq-e Hatem (Persian: قشلاق حاتم) (Note: Also romanized as Qeshlāq-e Ḩātem) is a village in Shahrak Rural District of Eslamabad District in Parsabad County, Ardabil province, Iran.

== Demographics ==
=== Population ===
At the time of the 2006 National Census, the village's population was 32 in nine households, when it was in Qeshlaq-e Shomali Rural District (Note: Renamed Owltan Rural District) of the Central District. The following census in 2011 counted 32 people in eight households. The 2016 census measured the population of the village as 33 people in nine households, by which time villages had been separated from the rural district in the formation of Eslamabad District. Qeshlaq-e Hatem was transferred to Shahrak Rural District created in the new district.
