= Havar Kandi Qeshlaqi =

Village in Ardabil province, Iran

Havar Kandi Qeshlaqi Persian: هاواركندي قشلاقي
- Village
- Location within Iran
- Coordinates: 39°34′11″N 47°40′32″E
- Country: Iran
- Province: Ardabil
- County: Parsabad
- District: Eslamabad
- Rural District: Eslamabad

Population (2016)
  - Total: 38
- Time zone: UTC+3:30 (IRST)

Havar Kandi Qeshlaqi (Persian: هاواركندي قشلاقي) (Note: Also romanized as Hāvār Kandī Qeshlāqī) is a village in Eslamabad Rural District of Eslamabad District in Parsabad County, Ardabil province, Iran.

== Demographics ==
=== Population ===
At the time of the 2006 National Census, the village's population was 65 in 12 households, when it was in Qeshlaq-e Shomali Rural District (Note: Renamed Owltan Rural District) of the Central District. The following census in 2011 counted 56 people in 12 households. The 2016 census measured the population of the village as 38 people in 13 households, by which time the village had been separated from the district in the formation of Eslamabad District. Havar Kandi Qeshlaqi was transferred to Eslamabad Rural District created in the new district.
