= Eslamabad-e Jadid =

Village in Ardabil province, Iran

Eslamabad-e Jadid Persian: اسلام ابادجديد
- Village
- Location within Iran
- Coordinates: 39°35′01″N 47°44′46″E
- Country: Iran
- Province: Ardabil
- County: Parsabad
- District: Eslamabad
- Rural District: Eslamabad

Population (2016)
  - Total: 1,585
- Time zone: UTC+3:30 (IRST)

Eslamabad-e Jadid (Persian: اسلام ابادجديد (Note: Also romanized as Eslāmābād-e Jadīd) is a village in, and the capital of, Eslamabad Rural District in Eslamabad District of Parsabad County, Ardabil province, Iran.

== Demographics ==
=== Population ===
At the time of the 2006 National Census, the village's population was 1,726 in 352 households, when it was in Qeshlaq-e Shomali Rural District (Note: Renamed Owltan Rural District) of the Central District. The following census in 2011 counted 1,501 people in 361 households. The 2016 census measured the population of the village as 1,585 people in 446 households, by which time the village had been separated from the district in the formation of Eslamabad District. The village was transferred to Eslamabad Rural District created in the new district. Eslamabad-e Jadid was the most populous village in its rural district.
