= Qeshlaq-e Qitranlu Hajj Mohammad Kandi =

Village in Ardabil province, Iran

Qeshlaq-e Qitranlu Hajj Mohammad Kandi Persian: قشلاق قيطرانلوحاج محمدكندي
- Village
- Country: Iran
- Province: Ardabil
- County: Parsabad
- District: Eslamabad
- Rural District: Shahrak

Population (2016)
  - Total: 505
- Time zone: UTC+3:30 (IRST)

Qeshlaq-e Qitranlu Hajj Mohammad Kandi (Persian: قشلاق قيطرانلوحاج محمدكندي) (Note: Also romanized as Qeshlāq-e Qīṭrānlū Ḩājj Moḩammad Kandī) is a village in Shahrak Rural District of Eslamabad District in Parsabad County, Ardabil province, Iran.

== Demographics ==
=== Population ===
At the time of the 2006 National Census, the village's population was 462 in 107 households, when it was in Qeshlaq-e Shomali Rural District (Note: Renamed Owltan Rural District) of the Central District. The following census in 2011 counted 628 people in 186 households. The 2016 census measured the population of the village as 505 people in 153 households, by which time the village had been separated from the rural district in the formation of Eslamabad District. Qeshlaq-e Qitranlu Hajj Mohammad Kandi was transferred to Shahrak Rural District created in the new district.
