= Tupraq Kandi =

Village in Ardabil province, Iran

Tupraq Kandi Persian: توپراق كندي
- Village
- Location within Iran
- Coordinates: 39°34′19″N 47°41′28″E
- Country: Iran
- Province: Ardabil
- County: Parsabad
- District: Eslamabad
- Rural District: Eslamabad

Population (2016)
  - Total: 653
- Time zone: UTC+3:30 (IRST)

Tupraq Kandi (Persian: توپراق كندي) (Note: Also romanized as Tūprāq Kandī) is a village in Eslamabad Rural District of Eslamabad District in Parsabad County, Ardabil province, Iran.

== Demographics ==
=== Population ===
At the time of the 2006 National Census, the village's population was 672 in 125 households, when it was in Qeshlaq-e Shomali Rural District (Note: Renamed Owltan Rural District) of the Central District. The following census in 2011 counted 692 people in 178 households. The 2016 census measured the population of the village as 653 people in 185 households, by which time the village had been separated from the district in the formation of Eslamabad District. Tupraq Kandi was transferred to Eslamabad Rural District created in the new district.
