= Qeshlaq-e Guneshli =

Village in Ardabil province, Iran

Qeshlaq-e Guneshli Persian: قشلاق گونشلي
- Village
- Location within Iran
- Coordinates: 39°24′03″N 47°42′11″E
- Country: Iran
- Province: Ardabil
- County: Parsabad
- District: Eslamabad
- Rural District: Shahrak

Population (2016)
  - Total: 262
- Time zone: UTC+3:30 (IRST)

Qeshlaq-e Guneshli (Persian: قشلاق گونشلي) (Note: Also romanized as Qeshlāq-e Gūneshlī) is a village in Shahrak Rural District of Eslamabad District in Parsabad County, Ardabil province, Iran.

== Demographics ==
=== Population ===
At the time of the 2006 National Census, the village's population was 99 in 18 households, when it was in Qeshlaq-e Shomali Rural District (Note: Renamed Owltan Rural District) of the Central District. The following census in 2011 counted 124 people in 30 households. The 2016 census measured the population of the village as 262 people in 69 households, by which time villages had been separated from the rural district in the formation of Eslamabad District. Qeshlaq-e Guneshli was transferred to Shahrak Rural District created in the new district.
