= Qeshlaq-e Hajj Dowlat Ahmad =

Village in Ardabil province, Iran

Qeshlaq-e Hajj Dowlat Ahmad Persian: قشلاق حاج دول ت احمد
- Village
- Country: Iran
- Province: Ardabil
- County: Parsabad
- District: Eslamabad
- Rural District: Shahrak

Population (2016)
  - Total: Below reporting threshold
- Time zone: UTC+3:30 (IRST)

Qeshlaq-e Hajj Dowlat Ahmad (Persian: قشلاق حاج دول ت احمد) (Note: Also romanized as Qeshlāq-e Ḩājj Dowlat Aḩmad) is a village in Shahrak Rural District of Eslamabad District in Parsabad County, Ardabil province, Iran.

== Demographics ==
=== Population ===
At the time of the 2006 National Census, the village's population was 18 in four households, when it was in Qeshlaq-e Shomali Rural District (Note: Renamed Owltan Rural District) of the Central District. The following census in 2011 counted a population below the reporting threshold. The 2016 census again measured the population of the village as below the reporting threshold, by which time villages had been separated from the rural district in the formation of Eslamabad District. Qeshlaq-e Hajj Dowlat Ahmad was transferred to Shahrak Rural District created in the new district.
