= Shahrak-e Gharbi =

Village in Ardabil province, Iran

Shahrak-e Gharbi Persian: شهرک غربي
- Village
- Location within Iran
- Country: Iran
- Province: Ardabil
- County: Parsabad
- District: Eslamabad
- Rural District: Shahrak

Population (2016)
  - Total: 745
- Time zone: UTC+3:30 (IRST)

Shahrak-e Gharbi (Persian: شهرک غربي) (Note: Also romanized as Shahrak-e Gharbī) is a village in, and the capital of, Shahrak Rural District in Eslamabad District of Parsabad County, Ardabil province, Iran.

== Demographics ==
=== Population ===
At the time of the 2006 National Census, the village's population was 1,425 in 384 households, when it was in Qeshlaq-e Shomali Rural District (Note: Renamed Owltan Rural District) of the Central District. The following census in 2011 counted 1,009 people in 260 households. The 2016 census measured the population of the village as 745 people in 218 households, by which time villages had been separated from the rural district in the formation of Eslamabad District. Shahrak-e Gharbi was transferred to Shahrak Rural District created in the new district. It was the most populous village in its rural district.
