= Hezar Kandi =

Village in Ardabil province, Iran

Hezar Kandi Persian: هزاركندي
- Village
- Location within Iran
- Coordinates: 39°32′05″N 47°38′17″E
- Country: Iran
- Province: Ardabil
- County: Parsabad
- District: Eslamabad
- Rural District: Eslamabad

Population (2016)
  - Total: 819
- Time zone: UTC+3:30 (IRST)

Hezar Kandi (Persian: هزاركندي) (Note: Also romanized as Hezār Kandī; also known as Hezār Qeshlāqī) is a village in Eslamabad Rural District of Eslamabad District in Parsabad County, Ardabil province, Iran.

== Demographics ==
=== Population ===
At the time of the 2006 National Census, the village's population was 688 in 152 households, when it was in Qeshlaq-e Shomali Rural District (Note: Renamed Owltan Rural District) of the Central District. The following census in 2011 counted 702 people in 179 households. The 2016 census measured the population of the village as 819 people in 246 households, by which time the village had been separated from the district in the formation of Eslamabad District. Hezar Kandi was transferred to Eslamabad Rural District created in the new district.
