= Qeshlaq-e Khalillu Heydar =

Village in Ardabil province, Iran

Qeshlaq-e Khalillu Heydar Persian: قشلاق خليل لوحيدر
- Village
- Location within Iran
- Coordinates: 39°29′18″N 47°37′34″E
- Country: Iran
- Province: Ardabil
- County: Parsabad
- District: Eslamabad
- Rural District: Shahrak

Population (2016)
  - Total: 66
- Time zone: UTC+3:30 (IRST)

Qeshlaq-e Khalilu Heydar (Persian: قشلاق خليل لوحيدر) (Note: Also romanized as Qeshlāq-e Khlaīllū Ḩeydar) is a village in Shahrak Rural District of Eslamabad District in Parsabad County, Ardabil province, Iran.

== Demographics ==
=== Population ===
At the time of the 2006 National Census, the village's population was 71 in 13 households, when it was in Qeshlaq-e Shomali Rural District (Note: Renamed Owltan Rural District) of the Central District. The following census in 2011 counted 79 people in 18 households. The 2016 census measured the population of the village as 66 people in 20 households, by which time villages had been separated from the rural district in the formation of Eslamabad District. Qeshlaq-e Khalillu Heydar was transferred to Shahrak Rural District created in the new district.
