= Qeshlaq-e Khalillu Gholam =

Village in Ardabil province, Iran

Qeshlaq-e Khalillu Gholam Persian: قشلاق خليل لوغلام
- Village
- Location within Iran
- Coordinates: 39°29′14″N 47°37′28″E
- Country: Iran
- Province: Ardabil
- County: Parsabad
- District: Eslamabad
- Rural District: Shahrak

Population (2016)
  - Total: 171
- Time zone: UTC+3:30 (IRST)

Qeshlaq-e Khalillu Gholam (Persian: قشلاق خليل لوغلام) (Note: Also romanized as Qeshlāq-e Khalīllū Gholām) is a village in Shahrak Rural District of Eslamabad District in Parsabad County, Ardabil province, Iran.

== Demographics ==
=== Population ===
At the time of the 2006 National Census, the village's population was 166 in 34 households, when it was in Qeshlaq-e Shomali Rural District (Note: Renamed Owltan Rural District) of the Central District. The following census in 2011 counted 198 people in 44 households. The 2016 census measured the population of the village as 171 people in 48 households, by which time villages had been separated from the rural district in the formation of Eslamabad District. Qeshlaq-e Khalillu Gholam was transferred to Shahrak Rural District created in the new district.
