= Qeshlaq-e Hajj Dowlat Savad =

Village in Ardabil province, Iran

Qeshlaq-e Hajj Dowlat Savad Persian: قشلاق حاج دولت سواد
- Village
- Country: Iran
- Province: Ardabil
- County: Parsabad
- District: Eslamabad
- Rural District: Shahrak

Population (2016)
  - Total: 45
- Time zone: UTC+3:30 (IRST)

Qeshlaq-e Hajj Dowlat Savad (Persian: قشلاق حاج دولت سواد) (Note: Also romanized as Qeshlāq-e Ḩājj Dowlat Savād) is a village in Shahrak Rural District of Eslamabad District in Parsabad County, Ardabil province, Iran.

== Demographics ==
=== Population ===
At the time of the 2006 National Census, the village's population was 30 in seven households, when it was in Qeshlaq-e Shomali Rural District (Note: Renamed Owltan Rural District) of the Central District. The following census in 2011 counted 45 people in 11 households. The 2016 census measured the population of the village as 45 people in 12 households, by which time the village had been separated from the rural district in the formation of Eslamabad District. Qeshlaq-e Hajj Dowlat Savad was transferred to Shahrak Rural District created in the new district.
