= Qeshlaq-e Hajji Qujakhan =

Village in Ardabil province, Iran

Qeshlaq-e Hajji Qujakhan Persian: قشلاق حاجي قوجاخان
- Village
- Country: Iran
- Province: Ardabil
- County: Parsabad
- District: Eslamabad
- Rural District: Shahrak

Population (2016)
  - Total: 22
- Time zone: UTC+3:30 (IRST)

Qeshlaq-e Hajji Qujakhan (Persian: قشلاق حاجي قوجاخان) (Note: Also romanized as Qeshlāq-e Ḩājjī Qūjākhān) is a village in Shahrak Rural District of Eslamabad District in Parsabad County, Ardabil province, Iran.

== Demographics ==
=== Population ===
At the time of the 2006 National Census, the village's population was 16 in four households, when it was in Qeshlaq-e Shomali Rural District (Note: Renamed Owltan Rural District) of the Central District. The following census in 2011 counted 33 people in 11 households. The 2016 census measured the population of the village as 22 people in eight households, by which time the village had been separated from the rural district in the formation of Eslamabad District. Qeshlaq-e Hajji Qujakhan was transferred to Shahrak Rural District created in the new district.
