= Qeshlaq-e Qarah Tappeh Maleklar =

Village in Ardabil province, Iran

Qeshlaq-e Qarah Tappeh Maleklar Persian: قشلاق قره تپه ملك لر
- Village
- Location within Iran
- Coordinates: 39°25′56″N 47°41′47″E
- Country: Iran
- Province: Ardabil
- County: Parsabad
- District: Eslamabad
- Rural District: Shahrak

Population (2016)
  - Total: 303
- Time zone: UTC+3:30 (IRST)

Qeshlaq-e Qarah Tappeh Maleklar (Persian: قشلاق قره تپه ملك لر) (Note: Also romanized as Qeshlāq-e Qarah Tappeh Maleklar) is a village in Shahrak Rural District of Eslamabad District in Parsabad County, Ardabil province, Iran.

== Demographics ==
=== Population ===
At the time of the 2006 National Census, the village's population was 212 in 45 households, when it was in Qeshlaq-e Shomali Rural District (Note: Renamed Owltan Rural District) of the Central District. The following census in 2011 counted 246 people in 70 households. The 2016 census measured the population of the village as 303 people in 99 households, by which time villages had been separated from the rural district in the formation of Eslamabad District. Qeshlaq-e Qarah Tappeh Maleklar was transferred to Shahrak Rural District created in the new district.
