= Qeshlaq-e Hajji Hasan Hajj Eslam =

Village in Ardabil province, Iran

Qeshlaq-e Hajji Hasan Hajj Eslam Persian: قشلاق حاجي حسن حاج اسلام
- Village
- Location within Iran
- Coordinates: 39°28′52″N 47°39′58″E
- Country: Iran
- Province: Ardabil
- County: Parsabad
- District: Eslamabad
- Rural District: Shahrak

Population (2016)
  - Total: 29
- Time zone: UTC+3:30 (IRST)

Qeshlaq-e Hajji Hasan Hajj Eslam (Persian: قشلاق حاجي حسن حاج اسلام) (Note: Also romanized as Qeshlāq-e Ḩājjī Ḩasan Ḩājj Eslām) is a village in Shahrak Rural District of Eslamabad District in Parsabad County, Ardabil province, Iran.

== Demographics ==
=== Population ===
At the time of the 2006 National Census, the village's population was 56 in 10 households, when it was in Qeshlaq-e Shomali Rural District (Note: Renamed Owltan Rural District) of the Central District. The following census in 2011 counted 77 people in 17 households. The 2016 census measured the population of the village as 29 people in eight households, by which time villages had been separated from the rural district in the formation of Eslamabad District. Qeshlaq-e Hajji Hasan Hajj Eslam was transferred to Shahrak Rural District created in the new district.
