= Oruj Qeshlaq-e Hajj Almas Khan =

Village in Ardabil province, Iran

Oruj Qeshlaq-e Hajj Almas Khan Persian: اروج قشلاق حاج الماس خان
- Village
- Location within Iran
- Coordinates: 39°32′11″N 47°46′08″E
- Country: Iran
- Province: Ardabil
- County: Parsabad
- District: Eslamabad
- Rural District: Shahrak

Population (2016)
  - Total: 82
- Time zone: UTC+3:30 (IRST)

Oruj Qeshlaq-e Hajj Almas Khan (Persian: اروج قشلاق حاج الماس خان) (Note: Also romanized as Orūj Qeshlāq-e Ḩājj Almās Khān) is a village in Shahrak Rural District of Eslamabad District in Parsabad County, Ardabil province, Iran.

== Demographics ==
=== Population ===
At the time of the 2006 National Census, the village's population was 102 in 21 households, when it was in Qeshlaq-e Shomali Rural District (Note: Renamed Owltan Rural District) of the Central District. The following census in 2011 counted 92 people in 23 households. The 2016 census measured the population of the village as 82 people in 23 households, by which time villages had been separated from the rural district in the formation of Eslamabad District. Oruj Qeshlaq-e Hajj Almas Khan was transferred to Shahrak Rural District created in the new district.
