= Qeshlaq-e Hajj Dowlat Yadollah =

Village in Ardabil province, Iran

Qeshlaq-e Hajj Dowlat Yadollah Persian: قشلاق حاج دولت يداله
- Village
- Country: Iran
- Province: Ardabil
- County: Parsabad
- District: Eslamabad
- Rural District: Shahrak

Population (2016)
  - Total: 26
- Time zone: UTC+3:30 (IRST)

Qeshlaq-e Hajj Dowlat Yadollah (Persian: قشلاق حاج دولت يداله) (Note: Also romanized as Qeshlāq-e Ḩājj Dowlat Yadollah) is a village in Shahrak Rural District of Eslamabad District in Parsabad County, Ardabil province, Iran.

== Demographics ==
=== Population ===
At the time of the 2006 National Census, the village's population was 17 in five households, when it was in Qeshlaq-e Shomali Rural District (Note: Renamed Owltan Rural District) of the Central District. The following census in 2011 counted 24 people in six households. The 2016 census measured the population of the village as 26 people in six households, by which time villages had been separated from the rural district in the formation of Eslamabad District. Qeshlaq-e Hajj Dowlat Yadollah was transferred to Shahrak Rural District created in the new district.
