= Qeshlaq-e Luleh Darreh Hajji Hasan =

Village in Ardabil province, Iran

Qeshlaq-e Luleh Darreh Hajji Hasan Persian: قشلاق لوله دره حاجي حسن
- Village
- Location within Iran
- Coordinates: 39°32′18″N 47°48′02″E
- Country: Iran
- Province: Ardabil
- County: Parsabad
- District: Eslamabad
- Rural District: Shahrak

Population (2016)
  - Total: 140
- Time zone: UTC+3:30 (IRST)

Qeshlaq-e Luleh Darreh Hajji Hasan (Persian: قشلاق لوله دره حاجي حسن) (Note: Also romanized as Qeshlāq-e Lūleh Darreh Ḩājjī Ḩasan) is a village in Shahrak Rural District of Eslamabad District in Parsabad County, Ardabil province, Iran.

== Demographics ==
=== Population ===
At the time of the 2006 National Census, the village's population was 189 in 41 households, when it was in Qeshlaq-e Shomali Rural District (Note: Renamed Owltan Rural District) of the Central District. The following census in 2011 counted a population of 168 people in 43 households. The 2016 census measured the population of the village as 140 people in 42 households, by which time villages had been separated from the rural district in the formation of Eslamabad District. Qeshlaq-e Luleh Darreh Hajji Hasan was transferred to Shahrak Rural District created in the new district.
