= Qeshlaq-e Hajj Ali Qoli Abdol =

Village in Ardabil province, Iran

Qeshlaq-e Hajj Ali Qoli Abdol Persian: قشلاق حاج علي قلي عبدل
- Village
- Location within Iran
- Coordinates: 39°27′07″N 47°39′04″E
- Country: Iran
- Province: Ardabil
- County: Parsabad
- District: Eslamabad
- Rural District: Shahrak

Population (2016)
  - Total: 47
- Time zone: UTC+3:30 (IRST)

Qeshlaq-e Hajj Ali Qoli Abdol (Persian: قشلاق حاج علي قلي عبدل) (Note: Also romanized as Qeshlāq-e Ḩājj ʿAlī Qolī ʿAbdol) is a village in Shahrak Rural District of Eslamabad District in Parsabad County, Ardabil province, Iran.

== Demographics ==
=== Population ===
At the time of the 2006 National Census, the village's population was 41 in eight households, when it was in Qeshlaq-e Shomali Rural District (Note: Renamed Owltan Rural District) of the Central District. The following census in 2011 counted 43 people in nine households. The 2016 census measured the population of the village as 47 people in 14 households, by which time the village had been separated from the rural district in the formation of Eslamabad District. Qeshlaq-e Hajj Ali Qoli Abdol was transferred to Shahrak Rural District created in the new district.
