= Qeshlaq-e Hajj Ali Qoli Jelal va Khan Aqa =

Village in Ardabil province, Iran

Qeshlaq-e Hajj Ali Qoli Jelal va Khan Aqa Persian: قشلاق حاج علي قلي جلال وخان اقا
- Village
- Location within Iran
- Coordinates: 39°27′03″N 47°40′16″E
- Country: Iran
- Province: Ardabil
- County: Parsabad
- District: Eslamabad
- Rural District: Shahrak

Population (2016)
  - Total: 77
- Time zone: UTC+3:30 (IRST)

Qeshlaq-e Hajj Ali Qoli Jelal va Khan Aqa (Persian: قشلاق حاج علي قلي جلال وخان اقا) (Note: Also romanized as Qeshlāq-e Ḩājj ʿAlī Qolī Jelāl va Khān Āqā) is a village in Shahrak Rural District of Eslamabad District in Parsabad County, Ardabil province, Iran.

== Demographics ==
=== Population ===
At the time of the 2006 National Census, the village's population was 32 in seven households, when it was in Qeshlaq-e Shomali Rural District (Note: Renamed Owltan Rural District) of the Central District. The following census in 2011 counted 57 people in 13 households. The 2016 census measured the population of the village as 77 people in 24 households, by which time the village had been separated from the rural district in the formation of Eslamabad District. Qeshlaq-e Hajj Ali Qoli Jelal va Khan Aqa was transferred to Shahrak Rural District created in the new district.
