= Oruj Qeshlaq =

Oruj Qeshlaq (Persian: اروج قشلاق) may refer to:

- Oruj Qeshlaq-e Hajj Almas Khan
- Oruj Qeshlaq-e Hajj Esmail
- Oruj Qeshlaq-e Hajj Omran
- Oruj Qeshlaq-e Morad
