= Uzun Tappeh-ye Sofla =

Village in Ardabil province, Iran

Uzun Tappeh-ye Sofla Persian: اوزن تپه سفلي
- Village
- Location within Iran
- Coordinates: 39°32′06″N 47°36′40″E
- Country: Iran
- Province: Ardabil
- County: Parsabad
- District: Eslamabad
- Rural District: Eslamabad

Population (2016)
  - Total: 583
- Time zone: UTC+3:30 (IRST)

Uzun Tappeh-ye Sofla (Persian: اوزن تپه سفلي) (Note: Also romanized as Uzūn Tappeh-ye Soflá; also known as Uzūn Tappeh) is a village in Eslamabad Rural District of Eslamabad District in Parsabad County, Ardabil province, Iran.

== Demographics ==
=== Population ===
households, when it was in Qeshlaq-e Shomali Rural District (Note: Renamed Owltan Rural District) of the Central District. The following census in 2011 counted 633 people in 168 households. The 2016 census measured the population of the village as 583 people in 165 households, by which time the village had been separated from the district in the formation of Eslamabad District. Uzun Tappeh-ye Sofla was transferred to Eslamabad Rural District created in the new district.
