= Qeshlaq-e Hajj Ali Qoli Ayaz =

Village in Ardabil province, Iran

Qeshlaq-e Hajj Ali Qoli Ayaz Persian: قشلاق حاج علي قلي اياز
- Village
- Location within Iran
- Coordinates: 39°26′30″N 47°40′18″E
- Country: Iran
- Province: Ardabil
- County: Parsabad
- District: Eslamabad
- Rural District: Shahrak

Population (2016)
  - Total: 70
- Time zone: UTC+3:30 (IRST)

Qeshlaq-e Hajj Ali Qoli Ayaz (Persian: قشلاق حاج علي قلي اياز) (Note: Also romanized as Qeshlāq-e Ḩājj ʿAlī Qolī Āyāz) is a village in Shahrak Rural District of Eslamabad District in Parsabad County, Ardabil province, Iran.

== Demographics ==
=== Population ===
At the time of the 2006 National Census, the village's population was 35 in six households, when it was in Qeshlaq-e Shomali Rural District (Note: Renamed Owltan Rural District) of the Central District. The following census in 2011 counted 38 people in seven households. The 2016 census measured the population of the village as 70 people in 22 households, by which time the village had been separated from the rural district in the formation of Eslamabad District. Qeshlaq-e Hajj Ali Qoli Ayaz was transferred to Shahrak Rural District created in the new district.
