= Qeshlaq-e Hajj Amir Forman =

Village in Ardabil province, Iran

Qeshlaq-e Hajj Amir Forman Persian: قشلاق حاج اميرفرمان
- Village
- Location within Iran
- Coordinates: 39°25′18″N 47°38′04″E
- Country: Iran
- Province: Ardabil
- County: Parsabad
- District: Eslamabad
- Rural District: Shahrak

Population (2016)
  - Total: 57
- Time zone: UTC+3:30 (IRST)

Qeshlaq-e Hajj Amir Forman (Persian: قشلاق حاج اميرفرمان) (Note: Also romanized as Qeshlāq-e Ḩājj Amīr Formān; also known as Qeshlāq-e Ḩājjī Farmān) is a village in Shahrak Rural District of Eslamabad District in Parsabad County, Ardabil province, Iran.

== Demographics ==
=== Population ===
At the time of the 2006 National Census, the village's population was 45 in 11 households, when it was in Qeshlaq-e Shomali Rural District (Note: Renamed Owltan Rural District) of the Central District. The following census in 2011 counted 34 people in eight households. The 2016 census measured the population of the village as 57 people in 18 households, by which time the village had been separated from the rural district in the formation of Eslamabad District. Qeshlaq-e Hajj Amir Forman was transferred to Shahrak Rural District created in the new district.
