= Qeshlaq-e Hajj Fathali Mansur =

Village in Ardabil province, Iran

Qeshlaq-e Hajj Fathali Mansur Persian: قشلاق حاج فتحعلي منصور
- Village
- Location within Iran
- Coordinates: 39°29′20″N 47°37′39″E
- Country: Iran
- Province: Ardabil
- County: Parsabad
- District: Eslamabad
- Rural District: Shahrak

Population (2016)
  - Total: 42
- Time zone: UTC+3:30 (IRST)

Qeshlaq-e Hajj Fathali Mansur (Persian: قشلاق حاج فتحعلي منصور) (Note: Also romanized as Qeshlāq-e Ḩājj Fatḥʿalī Manṣūr) is a village in Shahrak Rural District of Eslamabad District in Parsabad County, Ardabil province, Iran.

== Demographics ==
=== Population ===
At the time of the 2006 National Census, the village's population was 50 in 10 households, when it was in Qeshlaq-e Shomali Rural District (Note: Renamed Owltan Rural District) of the Central District. The following census in 2011 counted 45 people in 11 households. The 2016 census measured the population of the village as 42 people in 13 households, by which time villages had been separated from the rural district in the formation of Eslamabad District. Qeshlaq-e Hajj Fathali Mansur was transferred to Shahrak Rural District created in the new district.
