= Qeshlaq-e Hajj Fathali =

Village in Ardabil province, Iran

Qeshlaq-e Hajj Fathali Persian: قشلاق حاج فتحعلي
- Village
- Location within Iran
- Coordinates: 39°29′30″N 47°38′15″E
- Country: Iran
- Province: Ardabil
- County: Parsabad
- District: Eslamabad
- Rural District: Shahrak

Population (2016)
  - Total: 54
- Time zone: UTC+3:30 (IRST)

Qeshlaq-e Hajj Fathali (Persian: قشلاق حاج فتحعلي) (Note: Also romanized as Qeshlāq-e Ḩājj Fatḥʿalī) is a village in Shahrak Rural District of Eslamabad District in Parsabad County, Ardabil province, Iran.

== Demographics ==
=== Population ===
At the time of the 2006 National Census, the village's population was 67 in 12 households, when it was in Qeshlaq-e Shomali Rural District (Note: Renamed Owltan Rural District) of the Central District. The following census in 2011 counted 70 people in 16 households. The 2016 census measured the population of the village as 54 people in 14 households, by which time villages had been separated from the rural district in the formation of Eslamabad District. Qeshlaq-e Hajj Fathali was transferred to Shahrak Rural District created in the new district.
