= Qeshlaq-e Luleh Darreh Jamshid =

Village in Ardabil province, Iran

Qeshlaq-e Luleh Darreh Jamshid Persian: قشلاق لوله دره جمشيد
- Village
- Location within Iran
- Coordinates: 39°32′06″N 47°47′57″E
- Country: Iran
- Province: Ardabil
- County: Parsabad
- District: Eslamabad
- Rural District: Shahrak

Population (2016)
  - Total: 32
- Time zone: UTC+3:30 (IRST)

Qeshlaq-e Luleh Darreh Jamshid (Persian: قشلاق لوله دره جمشيد) (Note: Also romanized as Qeshlāq-e Lūleh Darreh Jamshīd) is a village in Shahrak Rural District of Eslamabad District in Parsabad County, Ardabil province, Iran.

== Demographics ==
=== Population ===
At the time of the 2006 National Census, the village's population was 38 in eight households, when it was in Qeshlaq-e Shomali Rural District (Note: Renamed Owltan Rural District) of the Central District. The following census in 2011 counted a population of 34 people in nine households. The 2016 census measured the population of the village as 32 people in eight households, by which time villages had been separated from the rural district in the formation of Eslamabad District. Qeshlaq-e Luleh Darreh Jamshid was transferred to Shahrak Rural District created in the new district.
