= Qeshlaq-e Sufilar Hajj Mirza Ali Aqa =

Village in Ardabil province, Iran

Qeshlaq-e Sufilar Hajj Mirza Ali Aqa Persian: قشلاق صوفيلارحاج ميرزاعلي اقا
- Village
- Location within Iran
- Coordinates: 39°23′52″N 47°41′51″E
- Country: Iran
- Province: Ardabil
- County: Parsabad
- District: Eslamabad
- Rural District: Shahrak

Population (2016)
  - Total: 101
- Time zone: UTC+3:30 (IRST)

Qeshlaq-e Sufilar Hajj Mirza Ali Aqa (Persian: قشلاق صوفيلارحاج ميرزاعلي اقا) (Note: Also romanized as Qeshlāq-e Şūfīlār Ḩājj Mīrzā ʿAlī Āqā) is a village in Shahrak Rural District of Eslamabad District in Parsabad County, Ardabil province, Iran.

== Demographics ==
=== Population ===
At the time of the 2006 National Census, the village's population was 54 in 13 households, when it was in Qeshlaq-e Shomali Rural District (Note: Renamed Owltan Rural District) of the Central District. The following census in 2011 counted 24 people in seven households. The 2016 census measured the population of the village as 101 people in 27 households, by which time the village had been separated from the rural district in the formation of Eslamabad District. Qeshlaq-e Sufilar Hajj Mirza Ali Aqa was transferred to Shahrak Rural District created in the new district.
