= Qeshlaq-e Hajj Mahmud =

Village in Ardabil province, Iran

Qeshlaq-e Hajj Mahmud Persian: قشلاق حاج محمود
- Village
- Location within Iran
- Coordinates: 39°26′58″N 47°39′35″E
- Country: Iran
- Province: Ardabil
- County: Parsabad
- District: Eslamabad
- Rural District: Shahrak

Population (2016)
  - Total: 129
- Time zone: UTC+3:30 (IRST)

Qeshlaq-e Hajj Mahmud (Persian: قشلاق حاج محمود) (Note: Also romanized as Qeshlāq-e Ḩājj Maḩmūd) is a village in Shahrak Rural District of Eslamabad District in Parsabad County, Ardabil province, Iran.

== Demographics ==
=== Population ===
At the time of the 2006 National Census, the village's population was 58 in 10 households, when it was in Qeshlaq-e Shomali Rural District (Note: Renamed Owltan Rural District) of the Central District. The following census in 2011 counted 24 people in five households. The 2016 census measured the population of the village as 129 people in 35 households, by which time the village had been separated from the rural district in the formation of Eslamabad District. Qeshlaq-e Hajj Mahmud was transferred to Shahrak Rural District created in the new district.
