= Oruj Qeshlaq-e Morad =

Village in Ardabil province, Iran

Oruj Qeshlaq-e Morad Persian: اروج قشلاق مراد
- Village
- Location within Iran
- Coordinates: 39°31′23″N 47°45′45″E
- Country: Iran
- Province: Ardabil
- County: Parsabad
- District: Eslamabad
- Rural District: Shahrak

Population (2016)
  - Total: 169
- Time zone: UTC+3:30 (IRST)

Oruj Qeshlaq-e Morad (Persian: اروج قشلاق مراد) (Note: Also romanized as Orūj Qeshlāq-e Morād) is a village in Shahrak Rural District of Eslamabad District in Parsabad County, Ardabil province, Iran.

== Demographics ==
=== Population ===
At the time of the 2006 National Census, the village's population was 154 in 33 households, when it was in Qeshlaq-e Shomali Rural District (Note: Renamed Owltan Rural District) of the Central District. The following census in 2011 counted 137 people in 37 households. The 2016 census measured the population of the village as 169 people in 45 households, by which time villages had been separated from the rural district in the formation of Eslamabad District. Oruj Qeshlaq-e Morad was transferred to Shahrak Rural District created in the new district.
