= Qeshlaq-e Qarah Tappeh Tamaq Ali =

Village in Ardabil province, Iran

Qeshlaq-e Qarah Tappeh Tamaq Ali Persian: قشلاق قره تپه تماق علي
- Village
- Country: Iran
- Province: Ardabil
- County: Parsabad
- District: Eslamabad
- Rural District: Shahrak

Population (2016)
  - Total: 292
- Time zone: UTC+3:30 (IRST)

Qeshlaq-e Qarah Tappeh Tamaq Ali (Persian: قشلاق قره تپه تماق علي) (Note: Also romanized as Qeshlāq-e Qarah Tappeh Tamāq ʿAlī) is a village in Shahrak Rural District of Eslamabad District in Parsabad County, Ardabil province, Iran.

== Demographics ==
=== Population ===
At the time of the 2006 National Census, the village's population was 175 in 33 households, when it was in Qeshlaq-e Shomali Rural District (Note: Renamed Owltan Rural District) of the Central District. The following census in 2011 counted 199 people in 55 households. The 2016 census measured the population of the village as 292 people in 88 households, by which time the village had been separated from the rural district in the formation of Eslamabad District. Qeshlaq-e Qarah Tappeh Tamaq Ali was transferred to Shahrak Rural District created in the new district.
