= Qeshlaq-e Khalillu Aziz =

Village in Ardabil province, Iran

Qeshlaq-e Khalillu Aziz Persian: قشلاق خليلوعزيز
- Village
- Location within Iran
- Coordinates: 39°29′06″N 47°37′18″E
- Country: Iran
- Province: Ardabil
- County: Parsabad
- District: Eslamabad
- Rural District: Shahrak

Population (2016)
  - Total: 121
- Time zone: UTC+3:30 (IRST)

Qeshlaq-e Khalillu Aziz (Persian: قشلاق خليلوعزيز) (Note: Also romanized as Qeshlāq-e Khalīllū ʿAzīz) is a village in Shahrak Rural District of Eslamabad District in Parsabad County, Ardabil province, Iran.

== Demographics ==
=== Population ===
At the time of the 2006 National Census, the village's population was 134 in 20 households, when it was in Qeshlaq-e Shomali Rural District (Note: Renamed Owltan Rural District) of the Central District. The following census in 2011 counted 145 people in 32 households. The 2016 census measured the population of the village as 121 people in 30 households, by which time villages had been separated from the rural district in the formation of Eslamabad District. Qeshlaq-e Khalillu Aziz was transferred to Shahrak Rural District created in the new district.
