= Qeshlaq-e Hajj Almas Khan =

Village in Ardabil province, Iran

Qeshlaq-e Hajj Almas Khan Persian: قشلاق حاج الماس خان
- Village
- Location within Iran
- Coordinates: 39°30′03″N 47°38′56″E
- Country: Iran
- Province: Ardabil
- County: Parsabad
- District: Eslamabad
- Rural District: Shahrak

Population (2016)
  - Total: 160
- Time zone: UTC+3:30 (IRST)

Qeshlaq-e Hajj Almas Khan (Persian: قشلاق حاج الماس خان) (Note: Also romanized as Qeshlāq-e Ḩājj Ālmās Khān) is a village in Shahrak Rural District of Eslamabad District in Parsabad County, Ardabil province, Iran.

== Demographics ==
=== Population ===
At the time of the 2006 National Census, the village's population was 197 in 41 households, when it was in Qeshlaq-e Shomali Rural District (Note: Renamed Owltan Rural District) of the Central District. The following census in 2011 counted 174 people in 43 households. The 2016 census measured the population of the village as 160 people in 44 households, by which time villages had been separated from the rural district in the formation of Eslamabad District. Qeshlaq-e Hajj Almas Khan was transferred to Shahrak Rural District created in the new district.
