= Oruj Qeshlaq-e Hajj Esmail =

Village in Ardabil province, Iran

Oruj Qeshlaq-e Hajj Esmail Persian: اروج قشلاق حاج اسماعيل
- Village
- Location within Iran
- Coordinates: 39°31′28″N 47°45′58″E
- Country: Iran
- Province: Ardabil
- County: Parsabad
- District: Eslamabad
- Rural District: Shahrak

Population (2016)
  - Total: 75
- Time zone: UTC+3:30 (IRST)

Oruj Qeshlaq-e Hajj Esmail (Persian: اروج قشلاق حاج اسماعيل) (Note: Also romanized as Orūj Qeshlāq-e Ḩājj Esmā‘īl) is a village in Shahrak Rural District of Eslamabad District in Parsabad County, Ardabil province, Iran.

== Demographics ==
=== Population ===
At the time of the 2006 National Census, the village's population was 60 in 10 households, when it was in Qeshlaq-e Shomali Rural District (Note: Renamed Owltan Rural District) of the Central District. The following census in 2011 counted 80 people in 20 households. The 2016 census measured the population of the village as 75 people in 19 households, by which time villages had been separated from the rural district in the formation of Eslamabad District. Oruj Qeshlaq-e Hajj Esmail was transferred to Shahrak Rural District created in the new district.
