= Qeshlaq-e Hajj Ali Qoli Jafar =

Village in Ardabil province, Iran

Qeshlaq-e Hajj Ali Qoli Jafar Persian: قشلاق حاج علي قلي جعفر
- Village
- Location within Iran
- Coordinates: 39°26′49″N 47°38′32″E
- Country: Iran
- Province: Ardabil
- County: Parsabad
- District: Eslamabad
- Rural District: Shahrak

Population (2016)
  - Total: 32
- Time zone: UTC+3:30 (IRST)

Qeshlaq-e Hajj Ali Qoli Jafar (Persian: قشلاق حاج علي قلي جعفر) (Note: Also romanized as Qeshlāq-e Ḩājj ʿAlī Qolī Jaʿfar) is a village in Shahrak Rural District of Eslamabad District in Parsabad County, Ardabil province, Iran.

== Demographics ==
=== Population ===
At the time of the 2006 National Census, the village's population was 29 in seven households, when it was in Qeshlaq-e Shomali Rural District (Note: Renamed Owltan Rural District) of the Central District. The following census in 2011 counted a population below the reporting threshold. The 2016 census measured the population of the village as 32 people in nine households, by which time the village had been separated from the rural district in the formation of Eslamabad District. Qeshlaq-e Hajj Ali Qoli Jafar was transferred to Shahrak Rural District created in the new district.
