= Qeshlaq-e Hajj Amir Mashhadi Safer =

Village in Ardabil province, Iran

Qeshlaq-e Hajj Amir Mashhadi Safer Persian: قشلاق حاج اميرمشهدي صفر
- Village
- Location within Iran
- Coordinates: 39°25′22″N 47°37′10″E
- Country: Iran
- Province: Ardabil
- County: Parsabad
- District: Eslamabad
- Rural District: Shahrak

Population (2016)
  - Total: 79
- Time zone: UTC+3:30 (IRST)

Qeshlaq-e Hajj Amir Mashhadi Safer (Persian: قشلاق حاج اميرمشهدي صفر) (Note: Also romanized as Qeshlāq-e Ḩājj Amīr Mashhadī Şafer) is a village in Shahrak Rural District of Eslamabad District in Parsabad County, Ardabil province, Iran.

== Demographics ==
=== Population ===
At the time of the 2006 National Census, the village's population was 97 in 21 households, when it was in Qeshlaq-e Shomali Rural District (Note: Renamed Owltan Rural District) of the Central District. The following census in 2011 counted 78 people in 18 households. The 2016 census measured the population of the village as 79 people in 24 households, by which time the village had been separated from the rural district in the formation of Eslamabad District. Qeshlaq-e Hajj Amir Mashhadi Safer was transferred to Shahrak Rural District created in the new district.
