= Qeshlaq-e Hajji Ayman Kandi-ye Olya =

Village in Ardabil province, Iran

Qeshlaq-e Hajji Ayman Kandi-ye Olya Persian: قشلاق حاجي ايمانكندي عليا
- Village
- Location within Iran
- Coordinates: 39°30′22″N 47°41′31″E
- Country: Iran
- Province: Ardabil
- County: Parsabad
- District: Eslamabad
- Rural District: Shahrak

Population (2016)
  - Total: 169
- Time zone: UTC+3:30 (IRST)

Qeshlaq-e Hajji Ayman Kandi-ye Olya (Persian: قشلاق حاجي ايمانكندي عليا) (Note: Also romanized as Qeshlāq-e Ḩājjī Aymān Kandī-ye ‘Olyā) is a village in Shahrak Rural District of Eslamabad District in Parsabad County, Ardabil province, Iran.

== Demographics ==
=== Population ===
At the time of the 2006 National Census, the village's population was 153 in 25 households, when it was in Qeshlaq-e Shomali Rural District (Note: Renamed Owltan Rural District) of the Central District. The following census in 2011 counted 176 people in 44 households. The 2016 census measured the population of the village as 169 people in 45 households, by which time villages had been separated from the rural district in the formation of Eslamabad District. Qeshlaq-e Hajji Ayman Kandi-ye Olya was transferred to Shahrak Rural District created in the new district.
