= Qeshlaq-e Hajj Amir Moharram =

Village in Ardabil province, Iran

Qeshlaq-e Hajj Amir Moharram Persian: قشلاق حاج امير محرم
- Village
- Location within Iran
- Coordinates: 39°25′21″N 47°38′35″E
- Country: Iran
- Province: Ardabil
- County: Parsabad
- District: Eslamabad
- Rural District: Shahrak

Population (2016)
  - Total: 79
- Time zone: UTC+3:30 (IRST)

Qeshlaq-e Hajj Amir Moharram (Persian: قشلاق حاج اميرمحرم) (Note: Also romanized as Qeshlaq-e Hajj Amir Maherem and Qeshlāq-e Ḩājj Amīr Maḥerem) is a village in Shahrak Rural District of Eslamabad District in Parsabad County, Ardabil province, Iran.

== Demographics ==
=== Population ===
At the time of the 2006 National Census, the village's population was 83 in 21 households, when it was in Qeshlaq-e Shomali Rural District (Note: Renamed Owltan Rural District) of the Central District. The following census in 2011 counted 56 people in 15 households. The 2016 census measured the population of the village as 79 people in 25 households, by which time the village had been separated from the rural district in the formation of Eslamabad District. Qeshlaq-e Hajj Amir Moharram was transferred to Shahrak Rural District created in the new district.
