= Uzun Tappeh-ye Olya =

Village in Ardabil province, Iran

Uzun Tappeh-ye Olya Persian: اوزن تپه عليا
- Village
- Location within Iran
- Coordinates: 39°31′33″N 47°36′24″E
- Country: Iran
- Province: Ardabil
- County: Parsabad
- District: Eslamabad
- Rural District: Eslamabad

Population (2016)
  - Total: 225
- Time zone: UTC+3:30 (IRST)

Uzun Tappeh-ye Olya (Persian: اوزن تپه عليا) (Note: Also romanized as Uzūn Tappeh-ye ‘Olyā; also known as Uzūn Tappeh) is a village in Eslamabad Rural District of Eslamabad District in Parsabad County, Ardabil province, Iran.

== Demographics ==
=== Population ===
At the time of the 2006 National Census, the village's population was 241 in 49 households, when it was in Qeshlaq-e Shomali Rural District (Note: Renamed Owltan Rural District) of the Central District. The following census in 2011 counted 266 people in 64 households. The 2016 census measured the population of the village as 225 people in 65 households, by which time the village had been separated from the district in the formation of Eslamabad District. Uzun Tappeh-ye Olya was transferred to Eslamabad Rural District created in the new district.
