= Oruj Qeshlaq-e Hajj Omran =

Village in Ardabil province, Iran

Oruj Qeshlaq-e Hajj Omran Persian: اروج قشلاق حاج عمران
- Village
- Location within Iran
- Coordinates: 39°31′06″N 47°45′39″E
- Country: Iran
- Province: Ardabil
- County: Parsabad
- District: Eslamabad
- Rural District: Shahrak

Population (2016)
  - Total: 352
- Time zone: UTC+3:30 (IRST)

Oruj Qeshlaq-e Hajj Omran (Persian: اروج قشلاق حاج عمران) (Note: Also romanized as Orūj Qeshlāq-e Ḩājj ‘Omrān) is a village in Shahrak Rural District of Eslamabad District in Parsabad County, Ardabil province, Iran.

== Demographics ==
=== Population ===
At the time of the 2006 National Census, the village's population was 370 in 73 households, when it was in Qeshlaq-e Shomali Rural District (Note: Renamed Owltan Rural District) of the Central District. The following census in 2011 counted 355 people in 79 households. The 2016 census measured the population of the village as 352 people in 102 households, by which time the village had been separated from the rural district in the formation of Eslamabad District. Oruj Qeshlaq-e Hajj Omran was transferred to Shahrak Rural District created in the new district.
