= Qeshlaq-e Sufilar Hamid =

Village in Ardabil province, Iran

Qeshlaq-e Sufilar Hamid Persian: قشلاق صوفيلارحميد
- Village
- Location within Iran
- Coordinates: 39°23′43″N 47°41′46″E
- Country: Iran
- Province: Ardabil
- County: Parsabad
- District: Eslamabad
- Rural District: Shahrak

Population (2016)
  - Total: 33
- Time zone: UTC+3:30 (IRST)

Qeshlaq-e Sufilar Hamid (Persian: قشلاق صوفيلارحميد) (Note: Also romanized as Qeshlāq-e Şūfīlār Ḩamīd) is a village in Shahrak Rural District of Eslamabad District in Parsabad County, Ardabil province, Iran.

== Demographics ==
=== Population ===
At the time of the 2006 National Census, the village's population was 31 in six households, when it was in Qeshlaq-e Shomali Rural District (Note: Renamed Owltan Rural District) of the Central District. The following census in 2011 counted 32 people in 11 households. The 2016 census measured the population of the village as 33 people in 10 households, by which time the village had been separated from the rural district in the formation of Eslamabad District. Qeshlaq-e Sufilar Hamid was transferred to Shahrak Rural District created in the new district.
