= Qeshlaq-e Hajji Dowlat Badar =

Village in Ardabil province, Iran

Qeshlaq-e Hajji Dowlat Badar Persian: قشلاق حاجي دولت بدر
- Village
- Location within Iran
- Coordinates: 39°25′03″N 47°39′40″E
- Country: Iran
- Province: Ardabil
- County: Parsabad
- District: Eslamabad
- Rural District: Shahrak

Population (2016)
  - Total: 28
- Time zone: UTC+3:30 (IRST)

Qeshlaq-e Hajji Dowlat Badar (Persian: قشلاق حاجي دولت بدر) (Note: Also romanized as Qeshlāq-e Ḩājjī Dowlat Badar) is a village in Shahrak Rural District of Eslamabad District in Parsabad County, Ardabil province, Iran.

== Demographics ==
=== Population ===
At the time of the 2006 National Census, the village's population was 19 in four households, when it was in Qeshlaq-e Shomali Rural District (Note: Renamed Owltan Rural District) of the Central District. The following census in 2011 counted 25 people in six households. The 2016 census measured the population of the village as 28 people in nine households, by which time the village had been separated from the rural district in the formation of Eslamabad District. Qeshlaq-e Hajji Dowlat Badar was transferred to Shahrak Rural District created in the new district.
