= Amurab Moghan Lake Camp =

Village in Ardabil province, Iran

Amurab Moghan Lake Camp Persian: كمپدرياچه اموراب مغان
- Village
- Country: Iran
- Province: Ardabil
- County: Parsabad
- District: Central
- Rural District: Owltan

Population (2016)
  - Total: 39
- Time zone: UTC+3:30 (IRST)

Amurab Moghan Lake Camp (Persian: كمپدرياچه اموراب مغان (Note: Romanized as Kamp Darīyācheh Amūrāb Moghān) is a village in Owltan Rural District (Note: Formerly Qeshlaq-e Shomali Rural District) of the Central District in Parsabad County, Ardabil province, Iran.

== Demographics ==
=== Population ===
At the time of the 2006 National Census, the village's population was 40 in 10 households, when it was in Qeshlaq-e Shomali Rural District. (Note: Renamed Owltan Rural District) The following census in 2011 counted 28 people in seven households. The 2016 census measured the population of the village as 39 people in 10 households, by which time the rural district had been renamed Owltan Rural District.
