= Eslamabad Rural District (Parsabad County) =

Rural district in Ardabil province, Iran

Eslamabad Rural District Persian: دهستان اسلام آباد
- Rural District
- Location within Iran
- Coordinates: 39°33′N 47°43′E
- Country: Iran
- Province: Ardabil
- County: Parsabad
- District: Eslamabad
- Established: 2012
- Capital: Eslamabad-e Jadid

Population (2016)
  - Total: 4,218
- Time zone: UTC+3:30 (IRST)

Eslamabad Rural District (Persian: دهستان اسلام آباد) is in Eslamabad District of Parsabad County, Ardabil province, Iran. Its capital is the village of Eslamabad-e Jadid.

== History ==
In 2012, villages were separated from Qeshlaq-e Shomali Rural District (Note: Renamed Owltan Rural District) of the Central District in the formation of Eslamabad District, and Eslamabad Rural District was created in the new district.

== Demographics ==
=== Population ===
At the time of the 2016 National Census, the rural district's population was 4,218 in 1,212 households. The most populous of its 10 villages was Eslamabad-e Jadid, with 1,585 people.

=== Other villages in the rural district ===
- Hajj Hasan Kandi
- Havar Kandi Qeshlaqi
- Hezar Kandi
- Khalil Kandi
- Rahim Kandi
- Tupraq Kandi
- Uzun Tappeh-ye Olya
- Uzun Tappeh-ye Sofla
