= Luleh Daraq-e Hajj Najaf =

Village in Ardabil province, Iran

Luleh Daraq-e Hajj Najaf Persian: لوله درق حاج نجف
- Village
- Location within Iran
- Coordinates: 39°34′15″N 47°47′51″E
- Country: Iran
- Province: Ardabil
- County: Parsabad
- District: Central
- Rural District: Owltan

Population (2016)
  - Total: 350
- Time zone: UTC+3:30 (IRST)

Luleh Daraq-e Hajj Najaf (Persian: لوله درق حاج نجف) (Note: Also romanized as Lūleh Daraq-e Ḩājj Najaf; also known as Lūleh Darreh) is a village in Owltan Rural District (Note: Formerly Qeshlaq-e Shomali Rural District) of the Central District in Parsabad County, Ardabil province, Iran.

== Demographics ==
=== Population ===
At the time of the 2006 National Census, the village's population was 424 in 91 households, when it was in Qeshlaq-e Shomali Rural District. (Note: Renamed Owltan Rural District) The following census in 2011 counted 339 people in 82 households. The 2016 census measured the population of the village as 350 people in 103 households, by which time the rural district had been renamed Owltan Rural District.
