= Qeshlaq-e Hajji Hasan, Ardabil =

Village in Ardabil province, Iran

Qeshlaq-e Hajji Hasan Persian: قشلاق حاجي حسن
- Village
- Location within Iran
- Coordinates: 39°29′41″N 47°38′22″E
- Country: Iran
- Province: Ardabil
- County: Parsabad
- District: Eslamabad
- Rural District: Shahrak

Population (2016)
  - Total: 112
- Time zone: UTC+3:30 (IRST)

Qeshlaq-e Hajji Hasan (Persian: قشلاق حاجي حسن) (Note: Also romanized as Qeshlāq-e Ḩājjī Ḩasan) is a village in Shahrak Rural District of Eslamabad District in Parsabad County, Ardabil province, Iran.

== Demographics ==
=== Population ===
At the time of the 2006 National Census, the village's population was 94 in 21 households, when it was in Qeshlaq-e Shomali Rural District (Note: Renamed Owltan Rural District) of the Central District. The following census in 2011 counted 93 people in 25 households. The 2016 census measured the population of the village as 112 people in 32 households, by which time villages had been separated from the rural district in the formation of Eslamabad District. Qeshlaq-e Hajji Hasan was transferred to Shahrak Rural District created in the new district.
