= Qarah Daghlu =

Village in Ardabil province, Iran

Qarah Daghlu Persian: قره داغلو
- Village
- Location within Iran
- Coordinates: 39°38′46″N 47°51′23″E
- Country: Iran
- Province: Ardabil
- County: Parsabad
- District: Central
- Rural District: Owltan

Population (2016)
  - Total: 881
- Time zone: UTC+3:30 (IRST)

Qarah Daghlu (Persian: قره داغلو) (Note: Also romanized as Qarah Dāghlū) is a village in Owltan Rural District (Note: Formerly Qeshlaq-e Shomali Rural District) of the Central District in Parsabad County, Ardabil province, Iran.

== Demographics ==
=== Population ===
At the time of the 2006 National Census, the village's population was 949 in 167 households, when it was in Qeshlaq-e Shomali Rural District. (Note: Renamed Owltan Rural District) The following census in 2011 counted 1,074 people in 262 households. The 2016 census measured the population of the village as 881 people in 251 households, by which time the rural district had been renamed Owltan Rural District.
