= Eslamabad-e Sofla, Ardabil =

Village in Ardabil province, Iran

Eslamabad-e Sofla Persian: اسلام ابادسفلي
- Village
- Location within Iran
- Coordinates: 39°34′25″N 47°48′54″E
- Country: Iran
- Province: Ardabil
- County: Parsabad
- District: Central
- Rural District: Owltan

Population (2016)
  - Total: 212
- Time zone: UTC+3:30 (IRST)

Eslamabad-e Sofla (Persian: اسلام ابادسفلي) (Note: Also romanized as Eslāmābād-e Soflá) is a village in Owltan Rural District (Note: Formerly Qeshlaq-e Shomali Rural District) of the Central District in Parsabad County, Ardabil province, Iran.

== Demographics ==
=== Population ===
At the time of the 2006 National Census, the village's population was 180 in 47 households, when it was in Qeshlaq-e Shomali Rural District. (Note: Renamed Owltan Rural District) The following census in 2011 counted 184 people in 53 households. The 2016 census measured the population of the village as 212 people in 62 households, by which time the rural district had been renamed Owltan Rural District.
