= Qeshlaq-e Khalillu =

Qeshlaq-e Khalillu or Qeshlaq-e Khalilu (Persian: قشلاق خليل لو) may refer to:

- Qeshlaq-e Khalillu Aziz
- Qeshlaq-e Khalillu Gholam
- Qeshlaq-e Khalillu Heydar
