= Pirayuvatlu =

Village in Ardabil province, Iran

Pirayuvatlu Persian: پيرايواتلو
- Village
- Location within Iran
- Coordinates: 39°37′16″N 47°47′27″E
- Country: Iran
- Province: Ardabil
- County: Parsabad
- District: Central
- Rural District: Owltan

Population (2016)
  - Total: 721
- Time zone: UTC+3:30 (IRST)

Pirayuvatlu (Persian: پيرايواتلو) (Note: Also romanized as Pīrāyūvātlū; also known as Pareh Vānlū) is a village in, and the capital of, Owltan Rural District (Note: Formerly Qeshlaq-e Shomali Rural District) in the Central District of Parsabad County, Ardabil province, Iran. The previous capital of the rural district was the village of Eslamabad-e Qadim, now the city of Eslamabad.

== Demographics ==
=== Population ===
At the time of the 2006 National Census, the village's population was 885 in 177 households, when it was in Qeshlaq-e Shomali Rural District. (Note: Renamed Owltan Rural District) The following census in 2011 counted 920 people in 219 households. The 2016 census measured the population of the village as 721 people in 216 households, by which time the rural district had been renamed Owltan Rural District.
