= Abadabad =

Village in Ardabil province, Iran

Abadabad Persian: عباداباد
- Village
- Location within Iran
- Coordinates: 39°38′07″N 47°49′50″E
- Country: Iran
- Province: Ardabil
- County: Parsabad
- District: Central
- Rural District: Owltan

Population (2016)
  - Total: 164
- Time zone: UTC+3:30 (IRST)

Abadabad (Persian: عباداباد) (Note: Also romanized as ʿAbādābād) is a village in Owltan Rural District (Note: Formerly Qeshlaq-e Shomali Rural District) of the Central District in Parsabad County, Ardabil province, Iran.

== Demographics ==
=== Population ===
At the time of the 2006 National Census, the village's population was 152 in 27 households, when it was in Qeshlaq-e Shomali Rural District. (Note: Renamed Owltan Rural District) The following census in 2011 counted 158 people in 41 households. The 2016 census measured the population of the village as 164 people in 48 households, by which time the rural district had been renamed Owltan Rural District.
