= Ebrahimabad-e Jadid, Ardabil =

Village in Ardabil province, Iran

Ebrahimabad-e Jadid Persian: ابراهيم ابادجديد
- Village
- Location within Iran
- Coordinates: 39°37′46″N 47°51′46″E
- Country: Iran
- Province: Ardabil
- County: Parsabad
- District: Central
- Rural District: Owltan

Population (2016)
  - Total: 2,464
- Time zone: UTC+3:30 (IRST)

Ebrahimabad-e Jadid (Persian: ابراهيم ابادجديد) (Note: Also romanized as Ebrāhīmābād-e Jadīd) is a village in Owltan Rural District (Note: Formerly Qeshlaq-e Shomali Rural District) of the Central District in Parsabad County, Ardabil province, Iran.

== Demographics ==
=== Population ===
At the time of the 2006 National Census, the village's population was 2,006 in 432 households, when it was in Qeshlaq-e Shomali Rural District. (Note: Renamed Owltan Rural District) The following census in 2011 counted 2,438 people in 589 households. The 2016 census measured the population of the village as 2,464 people in 690 households, by which time the rural district had been renamed Owltan Rural District.
