= Ayaz Kandi =

Village in Ardabil province, Iran

Ayaz Kandi Persian: ايازكندي
- Village
- Location within Iran
- Coordinates: 39°37′55″N 47°48′59″E
- Country: Iran
- Province: Ardabil
- County: Parsabad
- District: Central
- Rural District: Owltan

Population (2016)
  - Total: 94
- Time zone: UTC+3:30 (IRST)

Ayaz Kandi (Persian: ايازكندي) (Note: Also romanized as Ayāẕ Kandī) is a village in Owltan Rural District (Note: Formerly Qeshlaq-e Shomali Rural District) of the Central District in Parsabad County, Ardabil province, Iran.

== Demographics ==
=== Population ===
At the time of the 2006 National Census, the village's population was 98 in 18 households, when it was in Qeshlaq-e Shomali Rural District. (Note: Renamed Owltan Rural District) The following census in 2011 counted 100 people in 23 households. The 2016 census measured the population of the village as 94 people in 25 households, by which time the rural district had been renamed Owltan Rural District.
