= Salmanabad, Ardabil =

Village in Ardabil province, Iran

Salmanabad Persian: سلمان اباد
- Village
- Location within Iran
- Coordinates: 39°37′28″N 47°48′23″E
- Country: Iran
- Province: Ardabil
- County: Parsabad
- District: Central
- Rural District: Owltan

Population (2016)
  - Total: 49
- Time zone: UTC+3:30 (IRST)

Salmanabad (Persian: سلمان اباد) (Note: Also romanized as Salmānābād; also known as Salmān Kandī) is a village in Owltan Rural District (Note: Formerly Qeshlaq-e Shomali Rural District) of the Central District in Parsabad County, Ardabil province, Iran.

== Demographics ==
=== Population ===
At the time of the 2006 National Census, the village's population was 51 in 16 households, when it was in Qeshlaq-e Shomali Rural District. (Note: Renamed Owltan Rural District) The following census in 2011 counted 42 people in 10 households. The 2016 census measured the population of the village as 49 people in 12 households, by which time the rural district had been renamed Owltan Rural District.
