= Qeshlaq-e Hajji Hasan =

Qeshlaq-e Hajji Hasan (Persian: قشلاق حاجي حسن) may refer to:

- Qeshlaq-e Hajji Hasan, Ardabil
- Qeshlaq-e Hajji Hasan, West Azerbaijan
