= Alirezaabad-e Qadim =

- Location in Iran
- Coordinates: 39°34′56″N 47°44′46″E
- Country: Iran
- Province: Ardabil Province
- Time zone: UTC+3:30 (IRST)
  - Summer (DST): UTC+4:30 (IRDT)

Alirezaabad-e Qadim is a village in Parsabad County, Ardabil Province, Iran.
