= Uzun Tappeh =

Uzun Tappeh (Persian: اوزن تپه) may refer to:

- Uzun Tappeh-ye Olya
- Uzun Tappeh-ye Sofla
