= Qeshlaq-e Luleh Darreh =

Qeshlaq-e Luleh Darreh (Persian: قشلاق لوله دره) may refer to:

- Qeshlaq-e Luleh Darreh Hajji Hasan
- Qeshlaq-e Luleh Darreh Jamshid
