= Shahrak Rural District (Parsabad County) =

Rural district in Ardabil province, Iran

Shahrak Rural District Persian: دهستان شهرک
- Rural District
- Location within Iran
- Coordinates: 39°28′N 47°43′E
- Country: Iran
- Province: Ardabil
- County: Parsabad
- District: Eslamabad
- Established: 2012
- Capital: Shahrak-e Gharbi

Population (2016)
  - Total: 6,658
- Time zone: UTC+3:30 (IRST)

Shahrak Rural District (Persian: دهستان شهرک) is in Eslamabad District of Parsabad County, Ardabil province, Iran. Its capital is the village of Shahrak-e Gharbi.

== History ==
In 2012, villages were separated from Qeshlaq-e Shomali Rural District (Note: Renamed Owltan Rural District) of the Central District in the formation of Eslamabad District, and Shahrak Rural District was created in the new district.

== Demographics ==
=== Population ===
At the time of the 2016 National Census, the rural district's population was 6,658 in 1,932 households. The most populous of its 55 villages was Shahrak-e Gharbi, with 745 people.

=== Other villages in the rural district ===
- Ebrahim Kandi-ye Vosta
- Oruj Qeshlaq-e Hajj Almas Khan
- Oruj Qeshlaq-e Hajj Esmail
- Oruj Qeshlaq-e Hajj Omran
- Oruj Qeshlaq-e Morad
- Qaravgholi Ayibi
- Qeshlaq-e Ayyub Gikalu
- Qeshlaq-e Babakhan
- Qeshlaq-e Guneshli
- Qeshlaq-e Hajj Ali Qoli Abdol
- Qeshlaq-e Hajj Ali Qoli Ayaz
- Qeshlaq-e Hajj Ali Qoli Jafar
- Qeshlaq-e Hajj Ali Qoli Jelal va Khan Aqa
- Qeshlaq-e Hajj Almas Khan
- Qeshlaq-e Hajj Amir Forman
- Qeshlaq-e Hajj Amir Mashhadi Safer
- Qeshlaq-e Hajj Amir Moharram
- Qeshlaq-e Hajj Aymanlu Mahteman
- Qeshlaq-e Hajj Dowlat Ahmad
- Qeshlaq-e Hajj Dowlat Savad
- Qeshlaq-e Hajj Dowlat Yadollah
- Qeshlaq-e Hajj Fathali
- Qeshlaq-e Hajj Fathali Mansur
- Qeshlaq-e Hajj Mahmud
- Qeshlaq-e Hajji Ayman Kandi-ye Olya
- Qeshlaq-e Hajji Dowlat Badar
- Qeshlaq-e Hajji Hasan
- Qeshlaq-e Hajji Hasan Hajj Eslam
- Qeshlaq-e Hajji Qujakhan
- Qeshlaq-e Hatem
- Qeshlaq-e Khalillu Aziz
- Qeshlaq-e Khalillu Gholam
- Qeshlaq-e Khalillu Heydar
- Qeshlaq-e Luleh Darreh Hajji Hasan
- Qeshlaq-e Luleh Darreh Jamshid
- Qeshlaq-e Malek Kandi
- Qeshlaq-e Mehr Ali Kandi
- Qeshlaq-e Qarah Tappeh Maleklar
- Qeshlaq-e Qarah Tappeh Tamaq Ali
- Qeshlaq-e Qaravgholi Jabar
- Qeshlaq-e Qitranlu Hajj Mohammad Kandi
- Qeshlaq-e Sufilar Hajj Mirza Ali Aqa
- Qeshlaq-e Sufilar Hamid
- Qeshlaq-e Tumar Hajj Sad
- Qitranlu Soltani
- Tumaraqa Khan
