= Qeshlaq-e Qarah Tappeh =

Qeshlaq-e Qarah Tappeh or Qeshlaq-e Qareh Tappeh (Persian: قشلاق قره تپه) may refer to:

- Qeshlaq-e Qarah Tappeh Maleklar, Ardabil Province
- Qeshlaq-e Qarah Tappeh Tamaq Ali, Ardabil Province
- Qeshlaq-e Qarah Tappeh, East Azerbaijan
