= Qeshlaq-e Sufilar =

Qeshlaq-e Sufilar (Persian: قشلاق صوفيلار) may refer to:

- Qeshlaq-e Sufilar Hajj Mirza Ali Aqa
- Qeshlaq-e Sufilar Hamid
