= Owltan Castle =

Castle in Ardabil Province, Iran

Owltan castle
- قلعه اولتان

General information
- Type: Castle
- Location: Owltan, Iran

Owltan castle (Persian: قلعه اولتان) is a historical castle located in Parsabad County in Ardabil Province. The longevity of this fortress dates back to the Parthian Empire.
