= Azerbaijani population by urban area =

The following table is the list of urban areas by Azerbaijani population.

Rank	Urban area	Country	Official data	Estimations	Total population of the city	Image	Notes
1	Baku	Azerbaijan	90.3% Equivalent 1,848,107 Azeri (2009 census)	Majority	2,045,815 (2009 census)(2009 census)		
2	Tabriz	Iran	96.5% Azeri (2010 census)	Majority	1,494,998 (2011 census)		
3	Tehran	Iran	16.2% Azeri (2010 census)	16% — 1/6	8,154,051 (2011 census)		
4	Urmia	Iran	85.7% Azeris (2000 census)	Majority	667,499 (2011 census)		
5	Karaj	Iran	34.2% Azeris (2010 census)		1,614,626 (2011 census)		
6	Ardabil	Iran		Majority	482,632 (2011 census)		
7	Zanjan	Iran		Majority	386,851 (2011 census)		
8	Ganja	Azerbaijan	99.5% Equivalent 311,813 Azeris (2009 census)		313,300 (2009 census)		
9	Sumqayit	Azerbaijan	302,461 Azeri (2009 census)		309,446 (2009 census)		
10	Qum	Iran	26.6% Azers (2010 census)		1,074,036 (2011 census)		
11	Khoy	Iran		Majority	200,958 (2011 census)		
12	Maragheh	Iran		Majority	162,275 (2011 census)		
13	Marand	Iran		Majority	124,323 (2011 census)		
14	Miyandoab	Iran		Majority	123,081 (2011 census)		
15	Mingachevir	Azerbaijan	95,700 Azeri (2009 census)		96,304 (2011 census)		
16	Meyaneh	Iran		Majority	95,505 (2011 census)		
17	Parsabad	Iran		Majority	88,924 (2011 census)		
18	Abhar	Iran		Majority	87,396 (2011 census)		

== See also ==
- Azerbaijani population
- Azerbaijani diaspora
