= Amirreza Abdullahi =

Iranian child killed in a protest (2005–2018)

Amirreza Abdollahi
- Born: 7 October 2005; Parsabad, Moghan, Iran
- Died: 25 November 2018 (aged 13); Iran
- Known for: Victim of the November 2018 protests in Iran

Amirreza Abdullahi (October 7, 2005 – November 25, 2018) was an Iranian teenager and victim of the 2018 protests in Iran.

== Biography ==
Amirreza Abdollahi was born in 2006 in Parsabad, Moghan. In 2014, he migrated with his family—including his father, who worked as a construction plasterer—to Eslamshahr.

== Death ==
On 25 November 2018, on the second day of public protests against the increase in gasoline prices, Abdullahi left home for work. While passing near one of the areas where the protesters had gathered, he was shot by the security officers and died. After three days, Abdullahi's body was handed over to the family on 28 November 2018, and was buried in Parsabad, Moghan.

== Aftermath ==
Amirreza Abdollahi's family buried their son's body after three days. According to claims by some unspecified media outlets, the Abdollahi family had remained silent about their son's killing due to threats from security forces in case they spoke to the media.

In December 2019, a group known as the "Justice-Seeking Teachers" claimed that they had the names of 19 students aged 13 to 18 who were killed during the November 2019 protests and published them; Amirreza Abdollahi's name was among these students.

On 12 December 2019, Ali Shamkhani, the Secretary of the Supreme National Security Council, met with Amirreza Abdollahi's family. During this meeting, he told the Abdollahi family: "We are from among you. We are servants of the people. Unfortunately, a bitter incident happened to our country. People’s protests over livelihood issues are natural and accepted. No one opposes people expressing their criticisms in various ways. Unfortunately, some foreign and opportunistic elements who are against the nation and Iran's independence took advantage of the people's protests."

According to claims by officials of the Islamic Republic of Iran, these shootings were carried out by hostile forces, and the bullets fired did not belong to the security forces.

== See also ==
- 2019–2020 Iranian protests
