= Owltan =

City in Ardabil province, Iran

Owltan Persian: اولتان
- City
- Location within Iran
- Coordinates: 39°36′25″N 47°46′09″E
- Country: Iran
- Province: Ardabil
- County: Parsabad
- District: Central
- Established as a city: 2021

Population (2016)
  - Total: 3,622
- Time zone: UTC+3:30 (IRST)

Owltan (Persian: اولتان) (Note: Also romanized as Owltān; also known as Ūltān) is a city in the Central District of Parsabad County, Ardabil province, Iran.

== Demographics ==
=== Population ===
At the time of the 2006 National Census, Owltan's population was 3,610 in 810 households, when it was a village in Qeshlaq-e Shomali Rural District. (Note: Renamed Owltan Rural District) The following census in 2011 counted 3,991 people in 1,037 households. The 2016 census measured the population as 3,622 people in 990 households, by which time the rural district had been renamed Owltan Rural District. It was the most populous village in its rural district.

Owltan was converted to a city in 2021.

Owltan is located in on the site of the ancient Armenian city of Vardanacerta (pt) / Վարդանակերտ (hy).

== See also ==
- Owltan Castle
