= Eslamabad, Parsabad =

City in Ardabil province, Iran

Eslamabad Persian: اسلام آباد
- City
- Location within Iran
- Coordinates: 39°35′02″N 47°42′46″E
- Country: Iran
- Province: Ardabil
- County: Parsabad
- District: Eslamabad
- Established as a city: 2012

Population (2016)
  - Total: 3,068
- Time zone: UTC+3:30 (IRST)

Eslamabad (Persian: اسلام آباد) (Note: Formerly Eslamabad-e Qadim (اسلام اباد قديم), also romanized as Eslāmābād-e Qadīm) is a city in, and the capital of, Eslamabad District in Parsabad County, Ardabil province, Iran. As a village, it was the capital of Qeshlaq-e Shomali Rural District (Note: Renamed Owltan Rural District) until its capital was transferred to the village of Pirayuvatlu.

== Demographics ==
=== Population ===
At the time of the 2006 National Census, the population was 3,069 in 629 households, when it was a village in Qeshlaq-e Shomali Rural District of the Central District. The following census in 2011 counted 3,349 people in 869 households. The 2016 census measured the population as 3,068 people in 829 households, by which time the rural district had been renamed Owltan Rural District. The village was separated from the rural district in the formation of Eslamabad District, and at the same time, Eslamabad-e Qadim was converted to the city of Eslamabad.
