= Ardabil University of Medical Sciences =

Medical university in Ardabil Province of Iran

Coordinates: 38°12′50″N 48°17′49″E

- دانشگاه علوم پزشکی اردبیل
- Official logo
- Motto: Altruism, Responsibility, Professionalism
- Type: Public medical university
- Established: 1993
- Parent institution: Ministry of Health and Medical Education
- President: Dr. Behzad Davarnia
- Academic staff: 316
- Students: 4000+
- Location: Ardabil, Ardabil Province, Iran
- Campus: Urban
- Language: Persian
- Website: www.arums.ac.ir

Ardabil University of Medical Sciences (ARUMS; Persian: دانشگاه علوم پزشکی اردبیل) is a public medical university located in the capital city of Ardabil Province in northwestern Iran. The university operates under the supervision of the Ministry of Health and Medical Education (MOHME) and is responsible for medical education, biomedical research, and the administration of public healthcare services in Ardabil Province.

== History and operations ==
Established in 1993 following the separation of medical education from Tabriz University of Medical Sciences, ARUMS offers undergraduate, graduate, professional doctoral, residency, and fellowship programs in medicine, dentistry, pharmacy, nursing, midwifery, public health, allied health sciences, and biomedical sciences.

As of 2025, the university enrolled more than 4,000 students. Its academic structure comprises six schools located in Ardabil—Medicine, Dentistry, Pharmacy, Nursing and Midwifery, Public Health, and the International Campus—as well as two academic units in other cities of Ardabil Province: the Germi School of Nursing and the Meshkinshahr School of Health.

The university administers a network of teaching hospitals, research centers, and affiliated healthcare facilities that provide clinical services and serve as training sites for students, interns, residents, and fellows. Research activities are conducted through its academic departments and research centers in basic, clinical, and public health sciences.

In addition to its educational mission, ARUMS is responsible for the management of the public healthcare system in Ardabil Province through affiliated hospitals, healthcare centers, and provincial health networks.

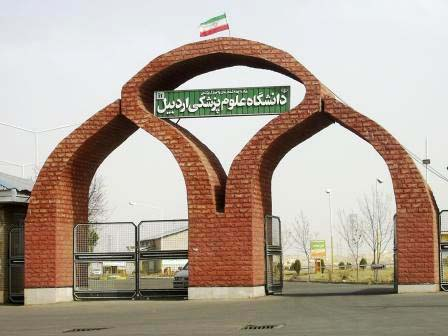
Ardabil University of Medical Sciences Entrance

== Administration ==
The university is administered by the President under the supervision of the Ministry of Health and Medical Education. Its executive structure includes the Vice-Presidencies for Education, Research and Technology, Healthcare, Student and Cultural Affairs, Food and Drug Administration, Development and Resource Management, and International Affairs.

=== Programs ===
ARUMS provides undergraduate, professional doctorate, master's, residency, fellowship, and PhD programs through its faculties and teaching hospitals.

== Schools ==
- Medicine and Paramedicine (Dean: Dr. Yousuf Mohammadi).
- Pharmacy (Dean: Dr. Leila Rezaee)
- Dentistry (Dean: Dr. Karim Jafari Kaffash)
- Health
- Health Educational Institution of Meshkinshahr
- Nursing and Midwifery (Dean: Dr. Nazila Vosoughi)
- Germi School of Nursing and Midwifery
- International Pardis School

== Affiliated hospitals ==
- Imam Khomeini Hospital
- Fatemi Hospital
- Bou Ali Hospital
- Alavi Hospital
- Imam Reza Hospital

== Research ==
Research at Ardabil University of Medical Sciences is conducted through its academic departments, affiliated teaching hospitals, and specialized research centers. The university supports research in clinical medicine, biomedical sciences, pharmaceutical sciences, public health, and health policy. As of 2026, the university comprises nine research centers approved by the Ministry of Health and Medical Education.

The university's research centers include:

- Center for Research on Arthropod-Borne Diseases
- Center for Research on Cancer Immunology and Immunotherapy
- Center for Research on Lung Diseases
- Center for Research on Traditional Medicine and Hydrotherapy
- Center for Research on Zoonoses
- Center for Research on Biosensors
- Center for Research in Pharmaceutical Sciences
- Center for Research on Gastrointestinal Diseases
- Center for Research on Social Determinants of Health

The university has been included in the SCImago Institutions Rankings (SIR), which evaluates higher education and research institutions based on indicators of research performance, innovation, and societal impact.

== International cooperation ==
Ardabil University of Medical Sciences maintains academic and research collaborations with universities and research institutions in several countries through memoranda of understanding (MoUs). The university's international activities include academic cooperation, student and faculty exchanges, and collaborative research initiatives coordinated by its Office of Global Strategies and International Affairs.

As of 2026, the university has signed memoranda of understanding with several international institutions, including Artvin Çoruh University, Atatürk University, Fırat University, Abant İzzet Baysal University, Uşak University, Istanbul University (Turkey), Kyrenia University and Near East University (Northern Cyprus), Azerbaijan Medical University and Khazar University (Azerbaijan), and Muhammad Ali Jinnah University (Pakistan).

== Student life ==
Students participate in scientific associations, cultural organizations, sports activities, and volunteer programs. In 2019, 46% of students reported having a moderate quality of life at Ardabil – with a female and Bachelor students reporting a higher quality of life than male and Masters students respectively.

== Rankings and reputation ==
Ardabil University of Medical Sciences has been included in several national and international university ranking systems.

In the Times Higher Education (THE) World University Rankings 2026, the university was placed in the 1001–1200 band globally.

In the Times Higher Education World University Rankings by Subject 2026, the university was ranked in the 801–1000 band worldwide in the Medical and Health subject area.

In the Times Higher Education Asia University Rankings 2026, the university was placed in the 501–600 band among universities in Asia.

The university is also evaluated by the SCImago Institutions Rankings (SIR), an international ranking system that assesses higher education and research institutions using indicators related to research performance, innovation, and societal impact.

Ardabil University of Medical Sciences is also listed in the World Directory of Medical Schools (WDOMS), an international directory of recognized medical schools maintained by the World Federation for Medical Education (WFME) in partnership with FAIMER.
