= Qeshlaq-e Hajj Hoseyn =

Qeshlaq-e Hajj Hoseyn قشلاق حاج حسين
- Village
- Country: Iran
- Province: East Azerbaijan
- County: Kaleybar
- Bakhsh: Abish Ahmad
- Rural District: Qeshlaq

Population (2006)
  - Total: 32
- Time zone: UTC+3:30 (IRST)
  - Summer (DST): UTC+4:30 (IRDT)

Qeshlaq-e Hajj Hoseyn (Persian: قشلاق حاج حسين, also Romanized as Qeshlāq-e Ḩājj Ḩoseyn) is a village in Qeshlaq Rural District, Abish Ahmad District, Kaleybar County, East Azerbaijan Province, Iran. At the 2006 census, its population was 32, in 9 families.
