= List of Iranian provinces by Human Development Index =

This is a list of Iranian provinces by Human Development Index as of 2023 with data for the year 2025.

| Rank | Province | HDI (2023) |
Very high human development
| 1 | Tehran (with Alborz) | 0.837 |
| 2 | Isfahan | 0.831 |
| 3 | Semnan | 0.824 |
| 4 | Yazd | 0.824 |
| 5 | Mazandaran | 0.824 |
| 6 | Qom | 0.816 |
| 7 | Ilam | 0.815 |
| 8 | Bushehr | 0.812 |
| 9 | Fars | 0.809 |
| 10 | Gilan | 0.804 |
| 11 | Khuzestan | 0.802 |
High Human Development
| – | Iran (average) | 0.799 |
| 12 | Kermanshah | 0.796 |
| 13 | Qazvin | 0.796 |
| 14 | Chaharmahal and Bakhtiari | 0.795 |
| 15 | Markazi | 0.792 |
| 16 | Kohgiluyeh and Boyer-Ahmad | 0.792 |
| 17 | East Azerbaijan | 0.785 |
| 18 | Razavi Khorasan | 0.782 |
| 19 | Lorestan | 0.781 |
| 20 | Kerman | 0.779 |
| 21 | Golestan | 0.777 |
| 22 | Hamedan | 0.774 |
| 23 | Zanjan | 0.772 |
| 24 | Hormozgan | 0.769 |
| 25 | Ardabil | 0.761 |
| 26 | West Azerbaijan | 0.759 |
| 27 | South Khorasan | 0.756 |
| 28 | North Khorasan | 0.746 |
| 29 | Kurdistan | 0.746 |
Medium Human Development
| 30 | Sistan and Baluchestan | 0.687 |

== See also ==
- List of countries by Human Development Index
