= Qeshlaq-e Hajji Hasan, West Azerbaijan =

Qeshlaq-e Hajji Hasan قشلاق حاجي حسن
- Village
- Location within Iran
- Coordinates: 36°56′42″N 46°01′03″E
- Country: Iran
- Province: West Azerbaijan
- County: Miandoab
- Bakhsh: Central
- Rural District: Mokriyan-e Shomali

Population (2006)
  - Total: 79
- Time zone: UTC+3:30 (IRST)
  - Summer (DST): UTC+4:30 (IRDT)

Qeshlaq-e Hajji Hasan (Persian: قشلاق حاجي حسن, also Romanized as Qēshlāq-e Ḩājjī Ḩasan) is a village in Mokriyan-e Shomali Rural District, in the Central District of Miandoab County, West Azerbaijan Province, Iran. At the 2006 census, its population was 79, in 18 families.
