= Parsabad =

City in Ardabil province, Iran

Parsabad پارس آباد (Persian) موغان شهر (Azerbaijani)
- City
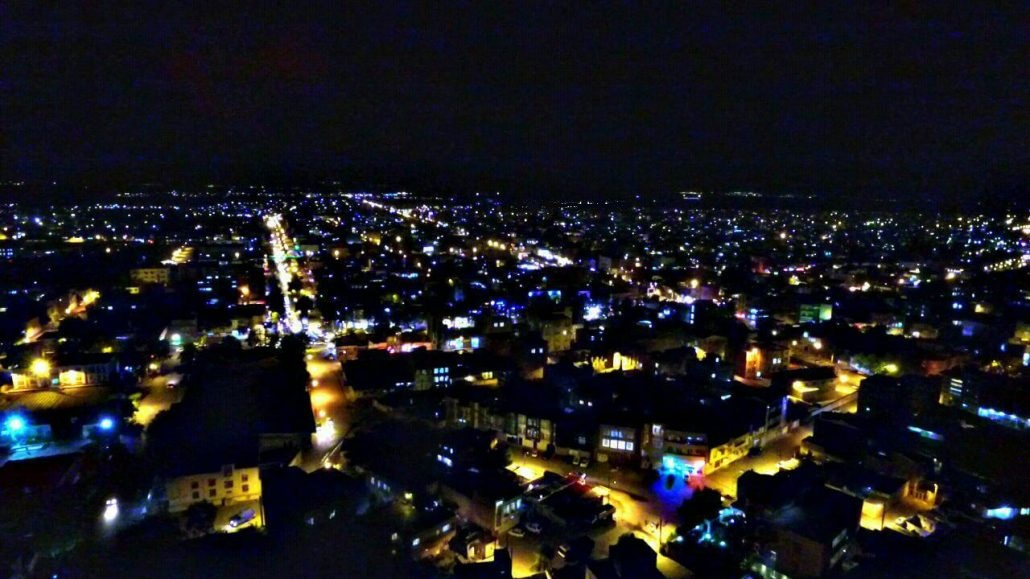
- Parsabad at night

- Location within Iran
- Coordinates: 39°38′36″N 47°54′46″E
- Country: Iran
- Province: Ardabil
- County: Parsabad
- District: Central

Population (2016)
  - Total: 93,387
- Time zone: UTC+3:30 (IRST)

Parsabad (Persian: پارس آباد; (Note: Also romanized as Pārsābād and Pârsâbâd; also known as Fārsābād and Parsabad-e Moghan) Azerbaijani: موغان شهر, romanized: Muğanşəhr) is a city in the Central District of Parsabad County of Ardabil province, Iran, serving as capital of both the county and the district. Parsabad is Iran's northernmost city. The city is located on the Mughan plain, on the right bank of the Aras River.

== Demographics ==
=== Population ===
At the time of the 2006 National Census, the city's population was 81,782 in 17,638 households. The following census in 2011 counted 88,924 people in 23,045 households. The 2016 census measured the population of the city as 93,387 people in 26,505 households.

== Climate ==
Parsabad has a cold semi-arid climate (BSk).

Climate data for Parsabad (1991-2020)
Month	Jan	Feb	Mar	Apr	May	Jun	Jul	Aug	Sep	Oct	Nov	Dec	Year
Record high °C (°F)	25.4 (77.7)	26.4 (79.5)	31.6 (88.9)	37.2 (99.0)	35.4 (95.7)	42.6 (108.7)	44.0 (111.2)	41.0 (105.8)	36.8 (98.2)	33.2 (91.8)	27.6 (81.7)	23.8 (74.8)	44.0 (111.2)
Mean daily maximum °C (°F)	8.6 (47.5)	10.1 (50.2)	14.3 (57.7)	19.6 (67.3)	26.1 (79.0)	31.8 (89.2)	34.0 (93.2)	33.3 (91.9)	28.0 (82.4)	21.6 (70.9)	14.3 (57.7)	9.8 (49.6)	21.0 (69.8)
Daily mean °C (°F)	3.4 (38.1)	4.7 (40.5)	8.4 (47.1)	13.4 (56.1)	19.4 (66.9)	24.6 (76.3)	27.2 (81.0)	26.6 (79.9)	21.9 (71.4)	15.9 (60.6)	9.2 (48.6)	4.7 (40.5)	15.0 (59.0)
Mean daily minimum °C (°F)	−0.6 (30.9)	0.4 (32.7)	3.9 (39.0)	8.1 (46.6)	13.6 (56.5)	17.8 (64.0)	20.8 (69.4)	20.5 (68.9)	16.8 (62.2)	11.5 (52.7)	5.3 (41.5)	1.0 (33.8)	9.9 (49.8)
Record low °C (°F)	−15.5 (4.1)	−13.0 (8.6)	−10.0 (14.0)	−3.4 (25.9)	0.2 (32.4)	8.0 (46.4)	11.4 (52.5)	11.8 (53.2)	8.0 (46.4)	−0.1 (31.8)	−6.2 (20.8)	−11.5 (11.3)	−15.5 (4.1)
Average precipitation mm (inches)	18.0 (0.71)	21.8 (0.86)	29.7 (1.17)	27.4 (1.08)	29.9 (1.18)	21.3 (0.84)	6.9 (0.27)	6.4 (0.25)	28.5 (1.12)	32.7 (1.29)	27.3 (1.07)	20.0 (0.79)	269.9 (10.63)
Average precipitation days (≥ 1.0 mm)	3.6	4.4	4.6	4.7	6.0	3.1	1.2	1.1	3.0	4.6	4.2	3.9	44.4
Average relative humidity (%)	79	79	77	75	71	61	58	62	71	79	82	83	73.1
Average dew point °C (°F)	−0.2 (31.6)	0.8 (33.4)	4.1 (39.4)	8.6 (47.5)	13.4 (56.1)	15.5 (59.9)	17.6 (63.7)	17.9 (64.2)	15.8 (60.4)	11.8 (53.2)	6.1 (43.0)	1.8 (35.2)	9.4 (49.0)
Mean monthly sunshine hours	123	119	147	171	237	286	297	270	204	166	124	114	2,258
Source: NOAA NCEI

Climate data for Parsabad (1984-2010)
Month	Jan	Feb	Mar	Apr	May	Jun	Jul	Aug	Sep	Oct	Nov	Dec	Year
Mean daily maximum °C (°F)	8.1 (46.6)	9.5 (49.1)	13.4 (56.1)	19.5 (67.1)	25.4 (77.7)	31.4 (88.5)	33.8 (92.8)	33.1 (91.6)	27.9 (82.2)	21.0 (69.8)	14.2 (57.6)	9.3 (48.7)	20.6 (69.0)
Daily mean °C (°F)	3.7 (38.7)	4.8 (40.6)	8.3 (46.9)	13.8 (56.8)	19.2 (66.6)	24.5 (76.1)	27.2 (81.0)	26.8 (80.2)	22.3 (72.1)	16.2 (61.2)	9.9 (49.8)	5.2 (41.4)	15.2 (59.3)
Mean daily minimum °C (°F)	−0.7 (30.7)	0.1 (32.2)	3.2 (37.8)	8.1 (46.6)	12.9 (55.2)	17.6 (63.7)	20.6 (69.1)	20.5 (68.9)	16.7 (62.1)	11.4 (52.5)	5.6 (42.1)	1.0 (33.8)	9.8 (49.6)
Average precipitation mm (inches)	14.8 (0.58)	18.8 (0.74)	29.5 (1.16)	31.7 (1.25)	34.7 (1.37)	19.3 (0.76)	7.3 (0.29)	7.3 (0.29)	24.8 (0.98)	34.4 (1.35)	28.3 (1.11)	20.3 (0.80)	271.2 (10.68)
Average snowy days	2.7	3.8	1.2	0.1	0	0	0	0	0	0	0.5	1.6	9.9
Average relative humidity (%)	79	78	76	75	70	61	59	61	69	78	82	83	73
Average dew point °C (°F)	−0.3 (31.5)	0.3 (32.5)	3.4 (38.1)	8.6 (47.5)	12.6 (54.7)	15.4 (59.7)	17.8 (64.0)	17.9 (64.2)	15.3 (59.5)	11.2 (52.2)	6.2 (43.2)	1.6 (34.9)	9.2 (48.5)
Mean monthly sunshine hours	117.4	122.1	143.1	171.0	237.9	282.4	287.3	266.2	204.1	158.2	117.6	114.0	2,221.3
Source: (dew point 1984-2005)
