= Eslamabad District =

District in Ardabil province, Iran

Eslamabad District Persian: بخش اسلام آباد
- District
- Location within Iran
- Coordinates: 39°30′N 47°42′E
- Country: Iran
- Province: Ardabil
- County: Parsabad
- Established: 2012
- Capital: Eslamabad

Population (2016)
  - Total: 13,944
- Time zone: UTC+3:30 (IRST)

Eslamabad District (Persian: بخش اسلام آباد) is in Parsabad County, Ardabil province, Iran. Its capital is the city of Eslamabad. (Note: Formerly Eslamabad-e Qadim)

== History ==
In 2012, villages were separated from Qeshlaq-e Shomali Rural District (Note: Renamed Owltan Rural District) of the Central District in the formation of Eslamabad District, which was divided into the new Eslamabad and Shahrak Rural Districts. At the same time, the village of Eslamabad was converted to a city.

== Demographics ==
=== Population ===
At the time of the 2016 National Census, the district's population was 13,944 inhabitants living in 3,973 households.

=== Administrative divisions ===
Eslamabad District Population
Administrative Divisions	2016
Eslamabad RD	4,218
Shahrak RD	6,658
Eslamabad (city)	3,068
Total	13,944
RD = Rural District
