= Owltan Rural District =

Rural district in Ardabil province, Iran

Owltan Rural District Persian: دهستان اولتان
- Rural District
- Location within Iran
- Coordinates: 39°37′N 47°50′E
- Country: Iran
- Province: Ardabil
- County: Parsabad
- District: Central
- Established: 1987
- Capital: Pirayuvatlu

Population (2016)
  - Total: 9,261
- Time zone: UTC+3:30 (IRST)

Owltan Rural District (Persian: دهستان اولتان) (Note: Formerly Qeshlaq-e Shomali Rural District (دهستان قشلاق شمالي)) is in the Central District of Parsabad County, Ardabil province, Iran. Its capital is the village of Pirayuvatlu. The previous capital of the rural district was the village of Eslamabad-e Qadim, now the city of Eslamabad.

== Demographics ==
=== Population ===
At the time of the 2006 National Census, the rural district's population (as Qeshlaq-e Shomali Rural District) was 23,821 in 5,115 households. The following census of 2011 counted 24,296 inhabitants living in 6,179 households. The 2016 census measured the population as 9,261 in 2,607 households, by which time the rural district had been renamed Owltan Rural District. The most populous of the rural district's 17 villages was Owltan (now a city), with 3,622 people.

=== Other villages in the rural district ===
- Abadabad
- Amurab Moghan Lake Camp
- Ayaz Kandi
- Ebrahimabad-e Jadid
- Eslamabad-e Sofla
- Luleh Daraq-e Hajj Najaf
- Qarah Daghlu
- Salmanabad
