= Central District (Parsabad County) =

District in Ardabil province, Iran

Central District (Parsabad County) Persian: بخش مرکزی شهرستان پارس‌آباد
- District
- Location within Iran
- Coordinates: 39°37′N 47°55′E
- Country: Iran
- Province: Ardabil
- County: Parsabad
- Established: 1991
- Capital: Parsabad

Population (2016)
  - Total: 118,144
- Time zone: UTC+3:30 (IRST)

The Central District of Parsabad County (Persian: بخش مرکزی شهرستان پارس‌آباد) is in Ardabil province, Iran. Its capital is the city of Parsabad.

== History ==
In 2012, villages were separated from Qeshlaq-e Shomali Rural District (Note: Renamed Owltan Rural District) in the formation of Eslamabad District. The village of Owltan was converted to a city in 2021.

== Demographics ==
=== Population ===
At the time of the 2006 National Census, the district's population was 122,923 in 26,307 households. The following census in 2011 counted 131,395 people in 33,857 households. The 2016 census measured the population of the district as 118,144 inhabitants living in 33,527 households.

=== Administrative divisions ===
Central District (Parsabad County) Population
Administrative Divisions	2006	2011	2016
Owltan RD (Note: Formerly Qeshlaq-e Shomali Rural District)	23,821	24,296	9,261
Savalan RD	17,320	18,175	15,496
Owltan (city) (Note: Became a city after the 2016 census)			
Parsabad (city)	81,782	88,924	93,387
Total	122,923	131,395	118,144
RD = Rural District
