= Parsabad County =

County in Ardabil province, Iran

Parsabad County Persian: شهرستان پارس‌آباد
- County
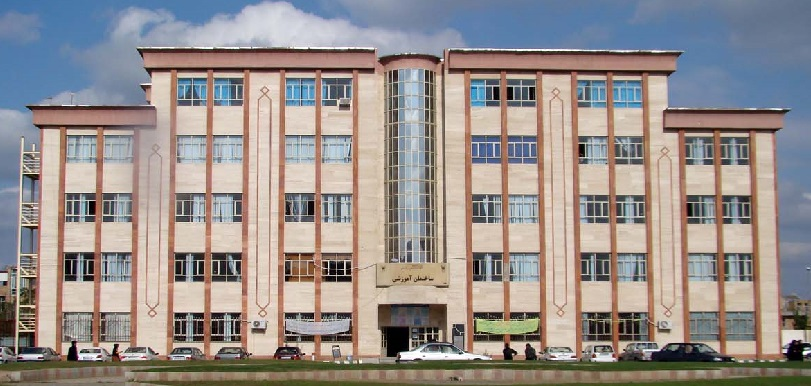
- Parsabad Islamic Azad University

- Location of Parsabad County in Ardabil province (top, yellow)

- Location of Ardabil province in Iran
- Coordinates: 39°33′N 47°53′E
- Country: Iran
- Province: Ardabil
- Established: 1991
- Capital: Parsabad
- Districts: Central, Eslamabad, Tazeh Kand

Area
  - Total: 814 km^{2} (314 sq mi)

Population (2016)
  - Total: 177,601
  - Density: 218/km^{2} (565/sq mi)
- Time zone: UTC+3:30 (IRST)

Parsabad County (Persian: شهرستان پارس‌آباد) is in Ardabil province, Iran. Its capital is the city of Parsabad.

== History ==
In 2008, the village of Tazeh Kand-e Qadim was converted to a city and later renamed Moghansar. In 2012, villages were separated from Qeshlaq-e Shomali Rural District (Note: Renamed Owltan Rural District) of the Central District in the formation of Eslamabad District, which was divided into the new Eslamabad and Shahrak Rural Districts. At the same time, the village of Eslamabad became a city.

Aslan Duz District was separated from the county in the establishment of Aslan Duz County in 2019, and the village of Owltan rose to city status in 2021.

== Demographics ==
=== Population ===
At the time of the 2006 National Census, the county's population was 164,576 in 34,456 households. The following census in 2011 counted 173,182 people in 44,035 households. The 2016 census measured the population of the county as 177,601 in 50,083 households.

=== Administrative divisions ===
Parsabad County's population history and administrative structure over three consecutive censuses are shown in the following table.

Parsabad County Population
| Administrative Divisions | 2006 | 2011 | 2016 |
|---|---|---|---|
| Central District | 122,923 | 131,395 | 118,144 |
| Owltan RD (Note: Formerly Qeshlaq-e Shomali Rural District) | 23,821 | 24,296 | 9,261 |
| Savalan RD | 17,320 | 18,175 | 15,496 |
| Owltan (city) (Note: Became a city after the 2016 census) | | | |
| Parsabad (city) | 81,782 | 88,924 | 93,387 |
| Aslan Duz District (Note: Transferred to Aslan Duz County) | 27,418 | 27,583 | 32,506 |
| Aslan Duz RD (Note: Renamed Aslan Duz-e Gharbi Rural District) | 15,324 | 16,116 | 17,709 |
| Qeshlaq-e Gharbi RD | 8,184 | 6,910 | 8,449 |
| Aslan Duz (city) | 3,910 | 4,557 | 6,348 |
| Eslamabad District | | | 13,944 |
| Eslamabad RD | | | 4,218 |
| Shahrak RD | | | 6,658 |
| Eslamabad (city) (Note: Formerly Eslamabad-e Qadim) | | | 3,068 |
| Tazeh Kand District | 14,235 | 14,204 | 13,006 |
| Mahmudabad RD (Note: Formerly Iranabad Rural District) | 5,579 | 5,525 | 4,615 |
| Tazeh Kand RD | 8,656 | 5,881 | 5,816 |
| Moghansar (city) (Note: Formerly Tazeh Kand-e Qadim) | | 2,798 | 2,575 |
| Total | 164,576 | 173,182 | 177,601 |
RD = Rural District

== See also ==
Media related to Parsabad County at Wikimedia Commons
