= Ardabil province =

Ardabil Province استان اردبیل (Persian)
- Province
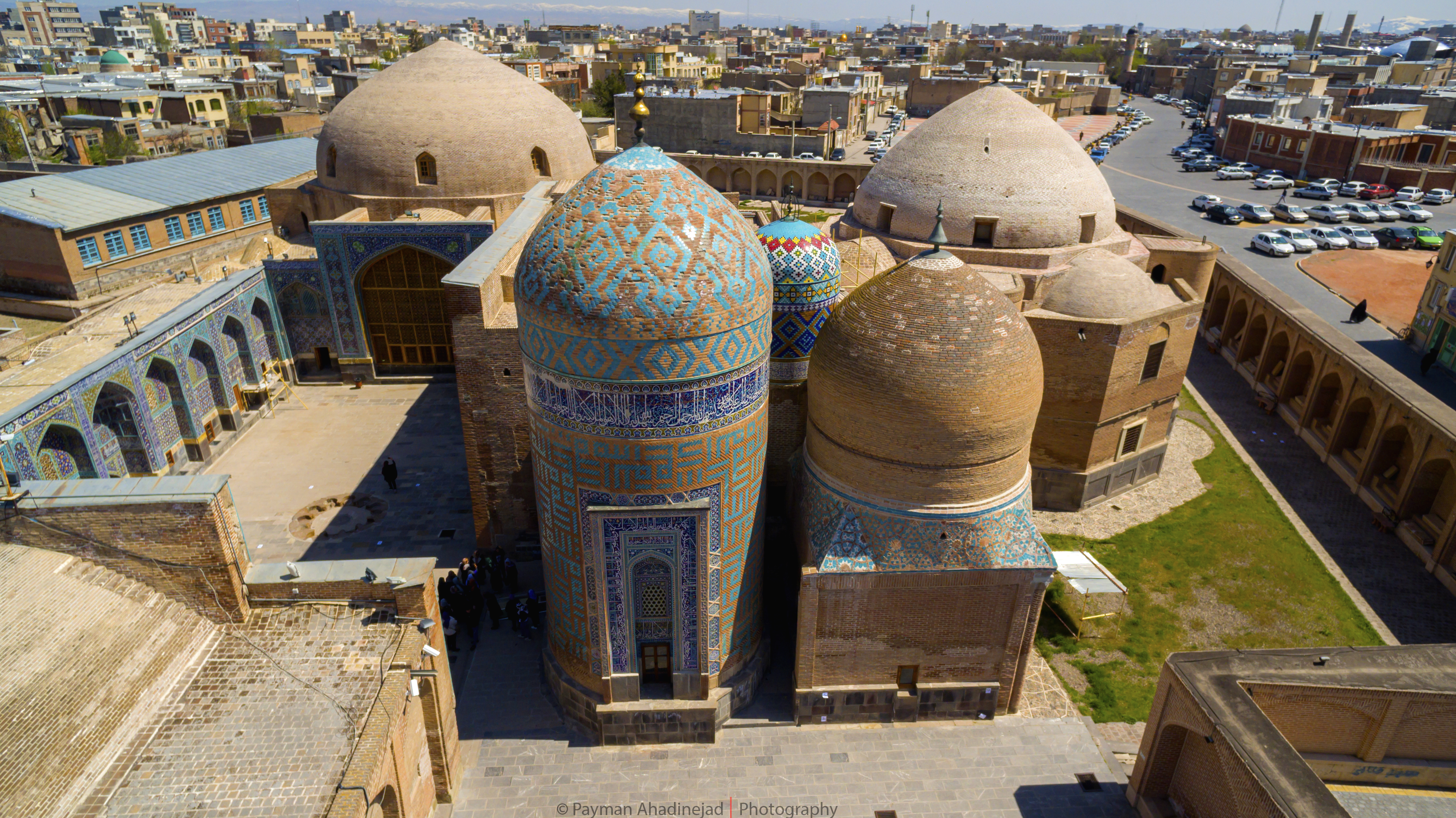
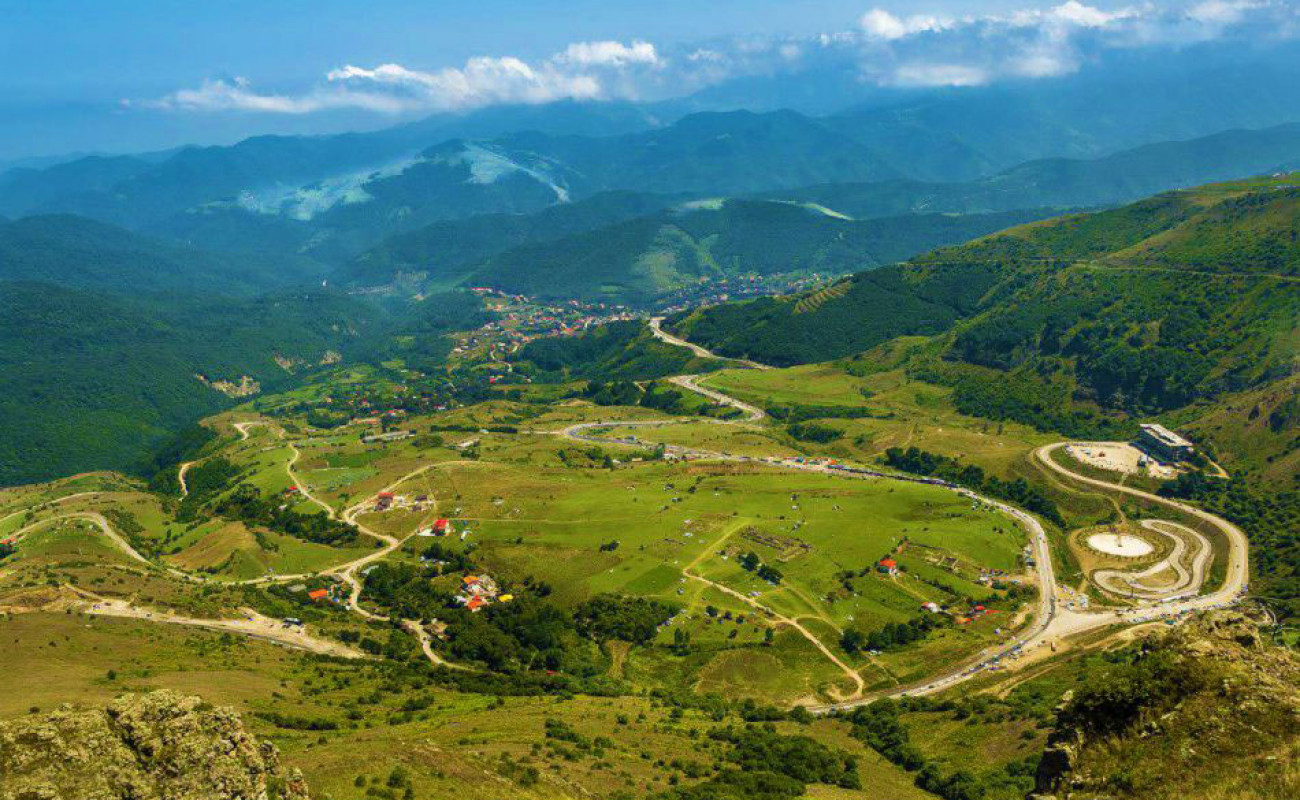
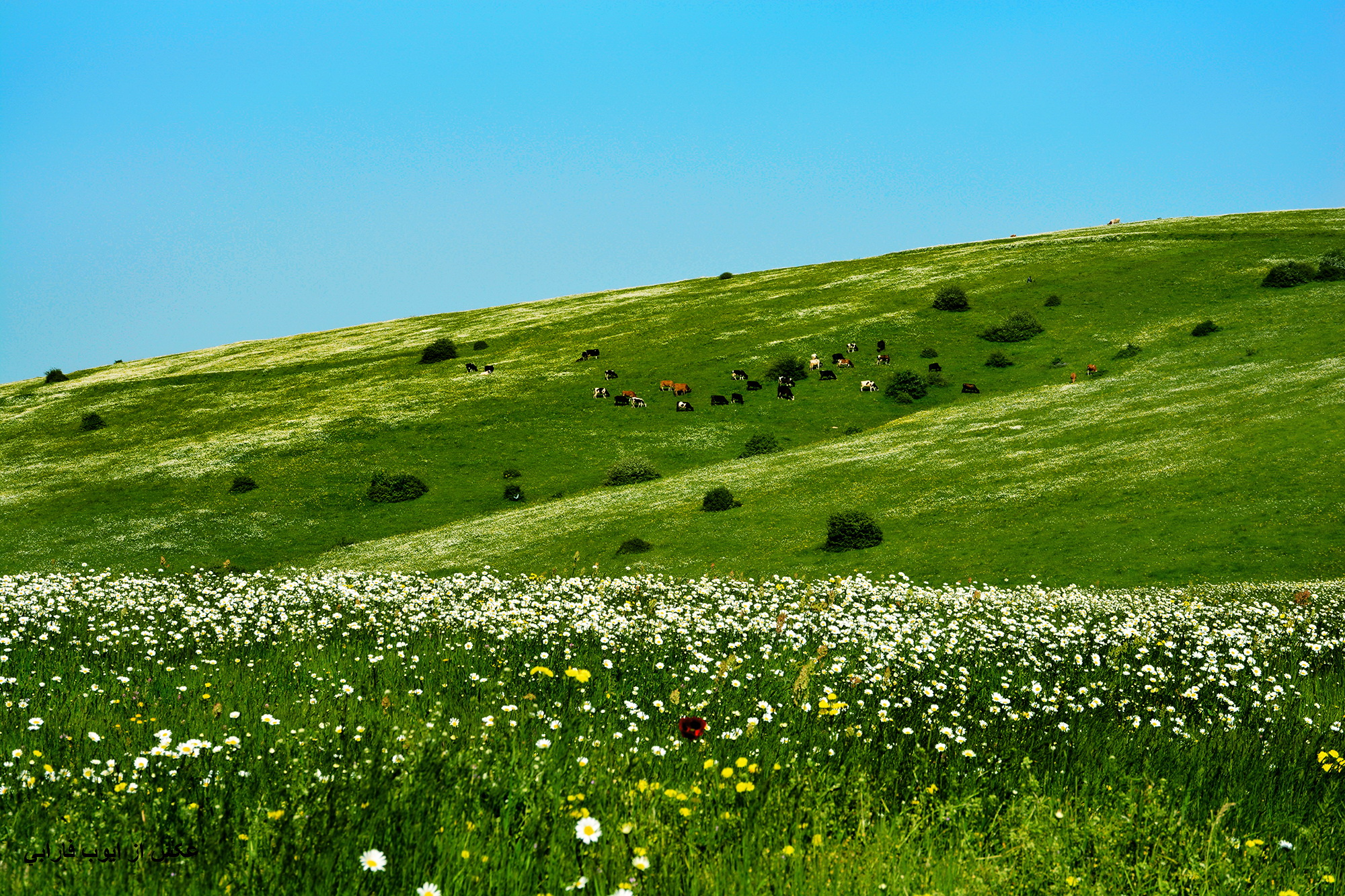
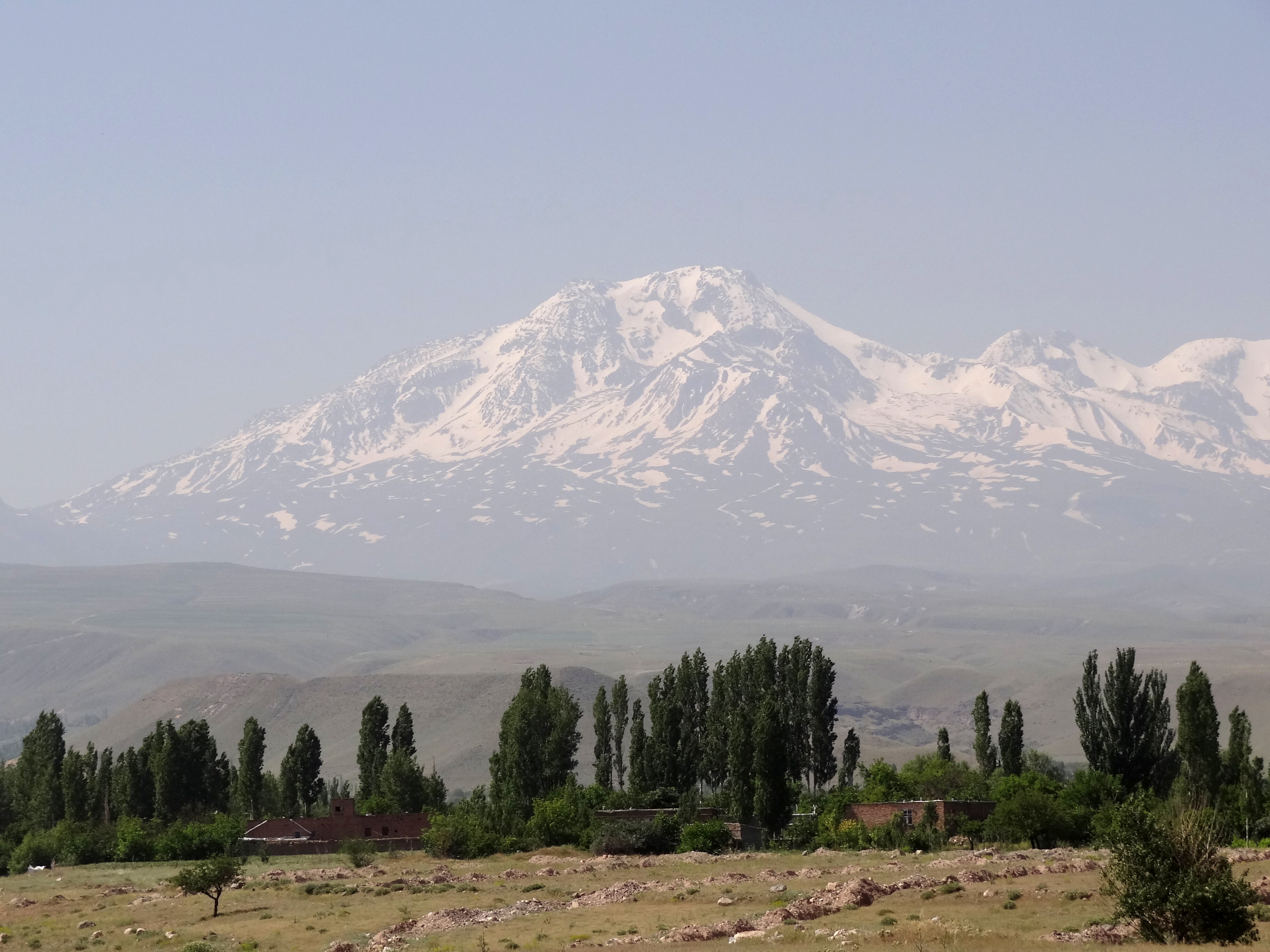

- Location of Ardabil province within Iran
- Coordinates: 38°26′N 48°06′E
- Country: Iran
- Region: Region 3
- Capital: Ardabil
- Counties: 12

Government
  - Governor-general: Masoud Emami Yeganeh (Independent)

Area
  - Total: 17,800 km^{2} (6,900 sq mi)

Population (2016)
  - Total: 1,270,420
  - Density: 71.4/km^{2} (185/sq mi)
- Time zone: UTC+03:30 (IRST)
- Area code: 45
- Main language(s): Persian (official) local languages: Azerbaijani; Shahsevani; Tati; Talysh
- HDI (2017): 0.756 high · 28th

Ardabil province (Persian: استان اردبیل) is one of the 31 provinces of Iran. Its capital is the city of Ardabil. The province is in the northwest of the country, in Region 3, bordering the Republic of Azerbaijan, and the Iranian provinces of East Azerbaijan, Zanjan, and Gilan. Spanning an area of 18,011 km^{2}, and established in 1993, Ardabil was carved out of the eastern part of East Azerbaijan province.

== History ==
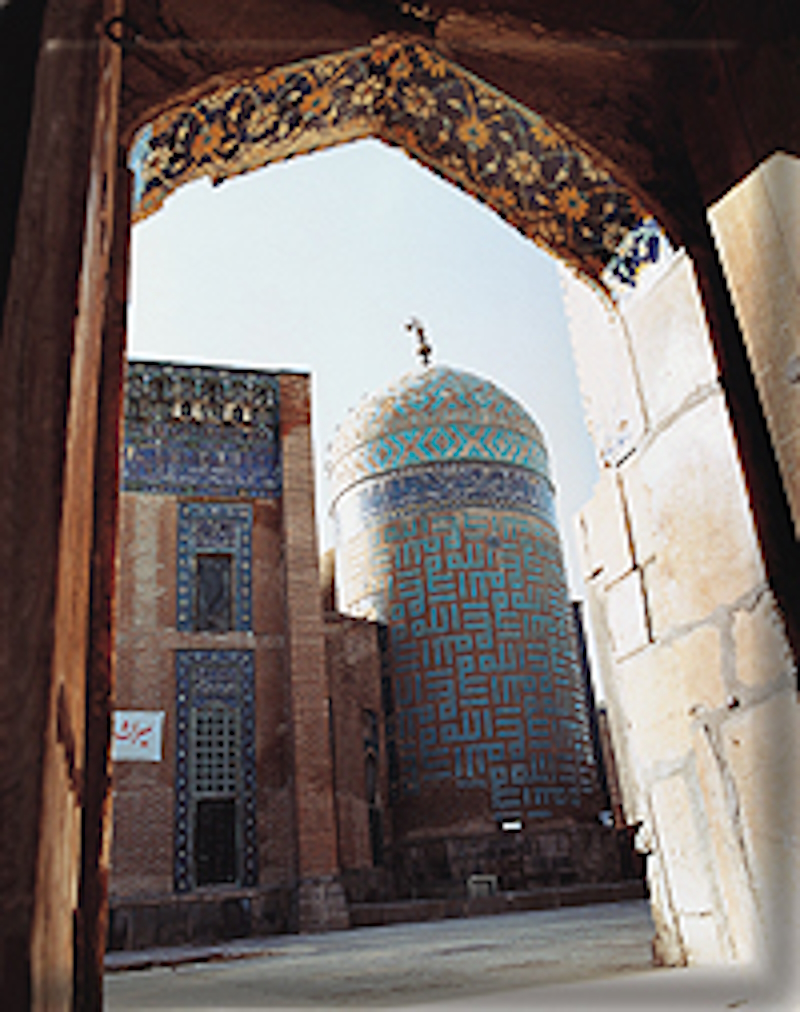
Sheikh Safi's Tomb

The natural features of the province of Ardabil are mentioned in the Avesta, according to which Zoroaster was born by the river Aras and wrote his book in the Sabalan Mountains. During the Muslim conquest of Iran, Ardabil was the largest city in Azarbaijan, and remained so until the Mongol invasion period.

Shah Ismail I started his campaign to nationalize Iran's government and land from here, but consequently announced Tabriz as his capital in 1500 CE. Yet Ardabil remained an important city both politically and economically until modern times.

== Demographics ==
=== Language ===
The primary language of Ardabil province is Azerbaijani, a Turkic language, which is spoken by a majority in every county.

Other languages in Ardabil include Tati (in Khalkhal county) and Talysh (in Namin county). Furthermore, there is a group of Kurmanji-speaking Kurds around the city of Khalkhal known as Gormanj. Persian is known by almost everyone in the province as it is the official language of the country, although very few speak it as their mother tongue.

=== Population ===
At the time of the 2006 National Census, the province's population was 1,209,968 in 281,433 households. The following census in 2011 counted 1,248,488 people in 337,943 households. The 2016 census measured the population of the province as 1,270,420 inhabitants in 377,423 households.

=== Administrative divisions ===

The population history and structural changes of Ardabil province's administrative divisions over three consecutive censuses are shown in the following table.

Ardabil Province
Counties	2006	2011	2016
Ardabil	542,930	564,365	605,992
Aslan Duz (Note: Separated from Parsabad County after the 2016 census)	—	—	—
Bileh Savar	54,471	53,768	51,404
Germi	89,248	84,267	76,901
Khalkhal	92,315	92,332	86,731
Kowsar	27,472	26,198	22,127
Meshgin Shahr	156,141	151,156	149,941
Namin	59,242	61,333	60,659
Nir	23,573	23,656	20,864
Parsabad	164,576	173,182	177,601
Sareyn (Note: Separated from Ardabil County after the 2006 census)	—	18,231	18,200
Ungut (Note: Separated from Germi County after the 2016 census)	—	—	—
Total	1,209,968	1,248,488	1,270,420

=== Cities ===
According to the 2016 census, 866,034 people (over 68% of the population of Ardabil province) live in the following cities:

City	Population
Abi Beyglu	6,516
Anbaran	5,757
Angut	2,645
Ardabil	529,374
Aslan Duz	6,348
Bileh Savar	16,188
Eslamabad	3,068
Fakhrabad	999
Germi	28,967
Hashjin	5,725
Hir	2,080
Jafarabad	7,226
Khalkhal	39,304
Kivi	7,101
Kolowr	2,347
Kuraim	831
Lahrud	2,149
Meshginshahr	74,109
Moghansar	2,575
Moradlu	671
Namin	13,659
Nir	5,873
Parsabad	93,387
Qosabeh	2,095
Razey	1,581
Sareyn	5,459

== Overview ==
Many tourists come to the region for its cool climate (max 35 °C [95 °F]) during the hot summer months. The winters are bitterly cold, with temperatures plummeting to −25 °C (−13 °F).

Its famous natural region is the Sabalan mountains. The province is considered the coldest province in Iran by many. Large parts of the province are green and forested.

Ardabil's capital stands about 70 km from the Caspian Sea. Neighboring the Caspian Sea and the Republic of Azerbaijan, the city is of political and economic significance.

Ardabil is the seat of the sanctuary and tomb of Shaikh Safî ad-Dîn, eponym of the Safavid dynasty Kulliye. It has many hot springs and natural landscapes which attract tourists. The mineral springs of Ardabil are Beele-Darreh, Sareyn, Sardabeh and Booshloo, which are known throughout Iran for their medicinal qualities.

It also has a number of lakes: the largest of which are Ne'or, Shoorabil, ShoorGel, NouShahr and Alooche, which are the habitats of some species of water birds.

Lake Ne'or is located in a mountainous area 48 km south-east of the city of Ardabil. It covers an area of 2.1 km^{2} and has an average depth of 3 metres. It is fed by springs in the lake bed. Lake Shoorabil is located in a hilly area south of the city of Ardabil and covers an area of 640,000 m^{2}. The surface of the lake is covered with a thin white layer of minerals, which is useful for healing skin diseases and rheumatism. Near the lake there is the leisure complex of Shoorabil.

Ardabil is a city of great antiquity. Its origins go back 4000 to 6000 years (according to historical research in this city). This city was the capital of Azerbaijan province in different times, but its golden age was in the Safavid period.

One of the most ancient cities in Iran is Meshkin Shahr. It is located in the north-west of Iran in Azerbaijan, 839 kilometers from Tehran. It is the closest city to the Sabalan mountains. In the past, it was called "Khiav", "Orami", and "Varavi".

== Colleges and universities ==
- Ardabil University of Medical Sciences
- Mohaghegh Ardabili University
- Islamic Azad University of Ardabil
- Payam Noor University of Ardabil
- Soureh University of Ardabil
- Islamic Azad University of Khalkhal

== See also ==
- Lerd tourist village

Media related to Ardabil Province at Wikimedia Commons
