= Aq Qabaq =

Aq Qabaq (Persian: اق قباق) may refer to:

- Aq Qabaq-e Golshad Kandi
- Aq Qabaq-e Olya
- Aq Qabaq-e Sofla
- Aq Qabaq-e Vosta
