= Qeshlaq-e Hajj Aqaqoli =

Village in Ardabil province, Iran

Qeshlaq-e Hajj Aqaqoli Persian: قشلاق حاج اقاقلي
- Village
- Location within Iran
- Coordinates: 39°25′59″N 47°35′14″E
- Country: Iran
- Province: Ardabil
- County: Ardabil
- District: Central
- Rural District: Aslan Duz-e Sharqi

Population (2016)
  - Total: 261
- Time zone: UTC+3:30 (IRST)

Qeshlaq-e Hajj Aqaqoli (Persian: قشلاق حاج اقاقلي) (Note: Also romanized as Qeshlāq-e Ḩājj Āqāqolī; also known as Qeshlaq-e Hajj Aqa Ali) is a village in Aslan Duz-e Sharqi Rural District of the Central District in Aslan Duz County, Ardabil province, Iran.

== Demographics ==
=== Population ===
At the time of the 2006 National Census, the village's population was 156 in 32 households, when it was in Aslan Duz Rural District (Note: Renamed Aslan Duz-e Gharbi Rural District) of the former Aslan Duz District in Parsabad County. The following census in 2011 counted 226 people in 55 households. The 2016 census measured the population of the village as 261 people in 70 households.

In 2019, the district was separated from the county in the establishment of Aslan Duz County. The rural district was transferred to the new Central District and renamed Aslan Duz-e Gharbi Rural District. Qeshlaq-e Hajj Aqaqoli was transferred to Aslan Duz-e Sharqi Rural District created in the district.
