= Hajj Amir Kandi =

Village in Ardabil province, Iran

Hajj Amir Kandi Persian: حاج اميركندي
- Village
- Location within Iran
- Coordinates: 39°29′38″N 47°31′53″E
- Country: Iran
- Province: Ardabil
- County: Ardabil
- District: Central
- Rural District: Aslan Duz-e Sharqi

Population (2016)
  - Total: 291
- Time zone: UTC+3:30 (IRST)

Hajj Amir Kandi (Persian: حاج اميركندي) (Note: Also romanized as Ḩājj Amīr Kandī) is a village in Aslan Duz-e Sharqi Rural District of the Central District in Aslan Duz County, Ardabil province, Iran.

== Demographics ==
=== Population ===
At the time of the 2006 National Census, the village's population was 272 in 48 households, when it was in Aslan Duz Rural District (Note: Renamed Aslan Duz-e Gharbi Rural District) of the former Aslan Duz District in Parsabad County. The following census in 2011 counted 250 people in 63 households. The 2016 census measured the population of the village as 291 people in 80 households.

In 2019, the district was separated from the county in the establishment of Aslan Duz County. The rural district was transferred to the new Central District and renamed Aslan Duz-e Gharbi Rural District. Hajj Amir Kandi was transferred to Aslan Duz-e Sharqi Rural District created in the district.
