= Omranabad, Ardabil =

Village in Ardabil province, Iran

Omranabad Persian: عمران اباد
- Village
- Location within Iran
- Coordinates: 39°28′47″N 47°36′13″E
- Country: Iran
- Province: Ardabil
- County: Ardabil
- District: Central
- Rural District: Aslan Duz-e Sharqi

Population (2016)
  - Total: 828
- Time zone: UTC+3:30 (IRST)

Omranabad (Persian: عمران اباد) (Note: Also romanized as ‘Omrānābād) is a village in Aslan Duz-e Sharqi Rural District of the Central District in Aslan Duz County, Ardabil province, Iran.

== Demographics ==
=== Population ===
At the time of the 2006 National Census, the village's population was 758 in 122 households, when it was in Aslan Duz Rural District (Note: Renamed Aslan Duz-e Gharbi Rural District) of the former Aslan Duz District in Parsabad County. The following census in 2011 counted 788 people in 192 households. The 2016 census measured the population of the village as 828 people in 232 households.

In 2019, the district was separated from the county in the establishment of Aslan Duz County. The rural district was transferred to the new Central District and renamed Aslan Duz-e Gharbi Rural District. Omranabad was transferred to Aslan Duz-e Sharqi Rural District created in the district.
