= Qelich Khan Kandi =

Village in Ardabil province, Iran

Qelich Khan Kandi Persian: قليچ خان كندي
- Village
- Location within Iran
- Coordinates: 39°28′55″N 47°30′06″E
- Country: Iran
- Province: Ardabil
- County: Ardabil
- District: Central
- Rural District: Aslan Duz-e Sharqi

Population (2016)
  - Total: 226
- Time zone: UTC+3:30 (IRST)

Qelich Khan Kandi (Persian: قليچ خان كندي) (Note: Also romanized as Qelīch Khān Kandī; also known as Qelīch Khānlū) is a village in Aslan Duz-e Sharqi Rural District of the Central District in Aslan Duz County, Ardabil province, Iran.

== Demographics ==
=== Population ===
At the time of the 2006 National Census, the village's population was 218 in 35 households, when it was in Aslan Duz Rural District (Note: Renamed Aslan Duz-e Gharbi Rural District) of the former Aslan Duz District in Parsabad County. The following census in 2011 counted 222 people in 53 households. The 2016 census measured the population of the village as 226 people in 57 households.

In 2019, the district was separated from the county in the establishment of Aslan Duz County. The rural district was transferred to the new Central District and renamed Aslan Duz-e Gharbi Rural District. Qelich Khan Kandi was transferred to Aslan Duz-e Sharqi Rural District created in the district.
