= Qeshlaq-e Hajji Bayandar =

Village in Ardabil province, Iran

Qeshlaq-e Hajji Bayandar Persian: قشلاق حاجي بايندر
- Village
- Location within Iran
- Coordinates: 39°26′08″N 47°34′26″E
- Country: Iran
- Province: Ardabil
- County: Ardabil
- District: Central
- Rural District: Aslan Duz-e Sharqi

Population (2016)
  - Total: 228
- Time zone: UTC+3:30 (IRST)

Qeshlaq-e Hajji Bayandar (Persian: قشلاق حاجي بايندر) (Note: Also romanized as Qeshlāq-e Ḩājjī Bāyandar) is a village in Aslan Duz-e Sharqi Rural District of the Central District in Aslan Duz County, Ardabil province, Iran.

== Demographics ==
=== Population ===
At the time of the 2006 National Census, the village's population was 140 in 31 households, when it was in Aslan Duz Rural District (Note: Renamed Aslan Duz-e Gharbi Rural District) of the former Aslan Duz District in Parsabad County. The following census in 2011 counted 208 people in 56 households. The 2016 census measured the population of the village as 228 people in 66 households.

In 2019, the district was separated from the county in the establishment of Aslan Duz County. The rural district was transferred to the new Central District and renamed Aslan Duz-e Gharbi Rural District. Qeshlaq-e Hajji Bayandar was transferred to Aslan Duz-e Sharqi Rural District created in the district.
