= Timur Kandi =

Village in Ardabil province, Iran

Timur Kandi Persian: تيموركندي
- Village
- Location within Iran
- Coordinates: 39°29′02″N 47°34′55″E
- Country: Iran
- Province: Ardabil
- County: Ardabil
- District: Central
- Rural District: Aslan Duz-e Sharqi

Population (2016)
  - Total: 92
- Time zone: UTC+3:30 (IRST)

Timur Kandi (Persian: تيموركندي) (Note: Also romanized as Tīmūr Kandī; also known as Teymūr and Tīmūr) is a village in Aslan Duz-e Sharqi Rural District of the Central District in Aslan Duz County, Ardabil province, Iran.

== Demographics ==
=== Population ===
At the time of the 2006 National Census, the village's population was 92 in 19 households, when it was in Aslan Duz Rural District (Note: Renamed Aslan Duz-e Gharbi Rural District) of the former Aslan Duz District in Parsabad County. The following census in 2011 counted 92 people in 21 households. The 2016 census measured the population of the village as 92 people in 26 households.

In 2019, the district was separated from the county in the establishment of Aslan Duz County. The rural district was transferred to the new Central District and renamed Aslan Duz-e Gharbi Rural District. Timur Kandi was transferred to Aslan Duz-e Sharqi Rural District created in the district.
