= Sarkhai Beyglu =

Village in Ardabil province, Iran

Sarkhai Beyglu Persian: سرخاي بيگلو
- Village
- Location within Iran
- Coordinates: 39°31′01″N 47°34′19″E
- Country: Iran
- Province: Ardabil
- County: Ardabil
- District: Central
- Rural District: Aslan Duz-e Sharqi

Population (2016)
  - Total: 375
- Time zone: UTC+3:30 (IRST)

Sarkhai Beyglu (Persian: سرخاي بيگلو) (Note: Also romanized as Sarkhāī Beyglū) is a village in Aslan Duz-e Sharqi Rural District of the Central District in Aslan Duz County, Ardabil province, Iran.

== Demographics ==
=== Population ===
At the time of the 2006 National Census, the village's population was 361 in 73 households, when it was in Aslan Duz Rural District (Note: Renamed Aslan Duz-e Gharbi Rural District) of the former Aslan Duz District in Parsabad County. The following census in 2011 counted 348 people in 83 households. The 2016 census measured the population of the village as 375 people in 101 households.

In 2019, the district was separated from the county in the establishment of Aslan Duz County. The rural district was transferred to the new Central District and renamed Aslan Duz-e Gharbi Rural District. Sarkhai Beyglu was transferred to Aslan Duz-e Sharqi Rural District created in the district.
