= Maqsudlu =

Maqsudlu (Persian: مقصودلو) may refer to:

- Maqsudlu, Azerbaijan
- Maqsudlu, Iran
- Maqsudlu-ye Olya, Iran
- Maqsudlu-ye Sofla, Iran
- Maqsudlu-ye Vosta, Iran
