= Nur Mohammad Kandi (disambiguation) =

Nur Mohammad Kandi is a village in Kurdistan Province, Iran,

Nur Mohammad Kandi (Persian: نورمحمدكندي) may also refer to:

- Nur Mohammad Kandi-ye Olya, Ardabil Province
- Nur Mohammad Kandi-ye Sofla, Ardabil Province
- Nur Mohammad Kandi-ye Vosta, Ardabil Province
