= Qeshlaq-e Balaja =

Village in Ardabil province, Iran

Qeshlaq-e Balaja Persian: قشلاق بالاجا
- Village
- Location within Iran
- Country: Iran
- Province: Ardabil
- County: Ardabil
- District: Central
- Rural District: Aslan Duz-e Sharqi

Population (2016)
  - Total: 42
- Time zone: UTC+3:30 (IRST)

Qeshlaq-e Balaja (Persian: قشلاق بالاجا) (Note: Also romanized as Qeshlāq-e Bālājā) is a village in Aslan Duz-e Sharqi Rural District of the Central District in Aslan Duz County, Ardabil province, Iran.

== Demographics ==
=== Population ===
At the time of the 2006 National Census, the village's population was 32 in four households, when it was in Aslan Duz Rural District (Note: Renamed Aslan Duz-e Gharbi Rural District) of the former Aslan Duz District in Parsabad County. The following census in 2011 counted 37 people in seven households. The 2016 census measured the population of the village as 42 people in 12 households.

In 2019, the district was separated from the county in the establishment of Aslan Duz County. The rural district was transferred to the new Central District, and renamed Aslan Duz-e Gharbi Rural District. Qeshlaq-e Balaja was transferred to Aslan Duz-e Sharqi Rural District created in the district.
