= Qeshlaq-e Hajj Aspar Kandi =

Village in Ardabil province, Iran

Qeshlaq-e Hajj Aspar Kandi Persian: قشلاق حاج اسپركندي
- Village
- Location within Iran
- Country: Iran
- Province: Ardabil
- County: Ardabil
- District: Central
- Rural District: Aslan Duz-e Sharqi

Population (2016)
  - Total: 142
- Time zone: UTC+3:30 (IRST)

Qeshlaq-e Hajj Aspar Kandi (Persian: قشلاق حاج اسپركندي) (Note: Also romanized as Qeshlāq-e Ḩājj Āspar Kandī) is a village in Aslan Duz-e Sharqi Rural District of the Central District in Aslan Duz County, Ardabil province, Iran.

== Demographics ==
=== Population ===
At the time of the 2006 National Census, the village's population was 109 in 15 households, when it was in Aslan Duz Rural District (Note: Renamed Aslan Duz-e Gharbi Rural District) of the former Aslan Duz District in Parsabad County. The following census in 2011 counted 119 people in 29 households. The 2016 census measured the population of the village as 142 people in 35 households.

In 2019, the district was separated from the county in the establishment of Aslan Duz County. The rural district was transferred to the new Central District and renamed Aslan Duz-e Gharbi Rural District. Qeshlaq-e Hajj Aspar Kandi was transferred to Aslan Duz-e Sharqi Rural District created in the district.
