= Asad Kandi =

Village in Ardabil province, Iran

Asad Kandi Persian: اسدكندي
- Village
- Location within Iran
- Coordinates: 39°27′47″N 47°26′57″E
- Country: Iran
- Province: Ardabil
- County: Ardabil
- District: Central
- Rural District: Aslan Duz-e Gharbi

Population (2016)
  - Total: 368
- Time zone: UTC+3:30 (IRST)

Asad Kandi (Persian: اسدكندي) (Note: Also romanized as Asad Kandī) is a village in Aslan Duz-e Gharbi Rural District (Note: Formerly Aslan Duz Rural District) of the Central District in Aslan Duz County, Ardabil province, Iran.

== Demographics ==
=== Population ===
At the time of the 2006 National Census, the village's population was 308 in 64 households, when it was in Aslan Duz Rural District (Note: Renamed Aslan Duz-e Gharbi Rural District) of the former Aslan Duz District in Parsabad County. The following census in 2011 counted 308 people in 88 households. The 2016 census measured the population of the village as 368 people in 117 households.

In 2019, the district was separated from the county in the establishment of Aslan Duz County. The rural district was transferred to the new Central District and renamed Aslan Duz-e Gharbi Rural District.
