= Nur Mohammad Kandi-ye Sofla =

Village in Ardabil province, Iran

Nur Mohammad Kandi-ye Sofla Persian: نورمحمدكندي سفلي
- Village
- Location within Iran
- Coordinates: 39°28′19″N 47°29′31″E
- Country: Iran
- Province: Ardabil
- County: Ardabil
- District: Central
- Rural District: Aslan Duz-e Sharqi

Population (2016)
  - Total: 562
- Time zone: UTC+3:30 (IRST)

Nur Mohammad Kandi-ye Sofla (Persian: نورمحمدكندي سفلي) (Note: Also romanized as Nūr Moḩammad Kandī-ye Soflá; also known as Nūr Moḩammad Kandī) is a village in Aslan Duz-e Sharqi Rural District of the Central District in Aslan Duz County, Ardabil province, Iran.

== Demographics ==
=== Population ===
At the time of the 2006 National Census, the village's population was 487 in 74 households, when it was in Aslan Duz Rural District (Note: Renamed Aslan Duz-e Gharbi Rural District) of the former Aslan Duz District in Parsabad County. The following census in 2011 counted 493 people in 123 households. The 2016 census measured the population of the village as 562 people in 172 households.

In 2019, the district was separated from the county in the establishment of Aslan Duz County. The rural district was transferred to the new Central District and renamed Aslan Duz-e Gharbi Rural District. Nur Mohammad Kandi-ye Sofla was transferred to Aslan Duz-e Sharqi Rural District created in the district.
