= Kachi Qeshlaqi-ye Olya =

Village in Ardabil province, Iran

Kachi Qeshlaqi-ye Olya Persian: كچي قشلاقي عليا
- Village
- Location within Iran
- Coordinates: 39°19′04″N 47°26′56″E
- Country: Iran
- Province: Ardabil
- County: Ardabil
- District: Central
- Rural District: Aslan Duz-e Gharbi

Population (2016)
  - Total: 155
- Time zone: UTC+3:30 (IRST)

Kachi Qeshlaqi-ye Olya (Persian: كچي قشلاقي عليا) is a village in Aslan Duz-e Gharbi Rural District (Note: Formerly Aslan Duz Rural District) of the Central District in Aslan Duz County, Ardabil province, Iran.

== Demographics ==
=== Population ===
The village did not appear in the 2006 National Census. At the time of the 2011 census, the village had a population of 107 in 24 households and was located in Aslan Duz Rural District (Note: Renamed Aslan Duz-e Gharbi Rural District) of the former Aslan Duz District in Parsabad County. The 2016 census measured the population of the village as 155 people in 40 households.

In 2019, the district was separated from the county in the establishment of Aslan Duz County. The rural district was transferred to the new Central District and renamed Aslan Duz-e Gharbi Rural District.
