= Tarbat Kandi =

Village in Ardabil province, Iran

Tarbat Kandi Persian: تربت كندي
- Village
- Location within Iran
- Coordinates: 39°27′26″N 47°25′52″E
- Country: Iran
- Province: Ardabil
- County: Ardabil
- District: Central
- Rural District: Aslan Duz-e Gharbi

Population (2016)
  - Total: 388
- Time zone: UTC+3:30 (IRST)

Tarbat Kandi (Persian: تربت كندي) (Note: Also romanized as Tarbat Kandī; also known as Tīrbīt) is a village in Aslan Duz-e Gharbi Rural District (Note: Formerly Aslan Duz Rural District) of the Central District in Aslan Duz County, Ardabil province, Iran.

== Demographics ==
=== Population ===
At the time of the 2006 National Census, the village's population was 505 in 101 households, when it was in Aslan Duz Rural District (Note: Renamed Aslan Duz-e Gharbi Rural District) of the former Aslan Duz District in Parsabad County. The following census in 2011 counted 407 people in 96 households. The 2016 census measured the population of the village as 388 people in 108 households.

In 2019, the district was separated from the county in the establishment of Aslan Duz County. The rural district was transferred to the new Central District and renamed Aslan Duz-e Gharbi Rural District.
