= Kachi Qeshlaqi-ye Vosta =

Village in Ardabil province, Iran

Kachi Qeshlaqi-ye Vosta Persian: كچي قشلاقي وسط
- Village
- Location within Iran
- Coordinates: 39°18′59″N 47°27′12″E
- Country: Iran
- Province: Ardabil
- County: Ardabil
- District: Central
- Rural District: Aslan Duz-e Gharbi

Population (2016)
  - Total: 27
- Time zone: UTC+3:30 (IRST)

Kachi Qeshlaqi-ye Vosta (Persian: كچي قشلاقي وسط) is a village in Aslan Duz-e Gharbi Rural District (Note: Formerly Aslan Duz Rural District) of the Central District in Aslan Duz County, Ardabil province, Iran.

== Demographics ==
=== Population ===
The village did not appear in the 2006 National Census. At the time of the 2011 census, the village's population was 23 in five households, when it was in Aslan Duz Rural District (Note: Renamed Aslan Duz-e Gharbi Rural District) of the former Aslan Duz District in Parsabad County. The 2016 census measured the population of the village as 27 people in seven households.

In 2019, the district was separated from the county in the establishment of Aslan Duz County. The rural district was transferred to the new Central District and renamed Aslan Duz-e Gharbi Rural District.
