= Idir, Iran =

Idir (Persian: ايدير), also rendered as Ider or Igdir or Ikdir or Igdyr, in Iran may refer to:

- Igdir, Iran
- Idir-e Olya
- Idir-e Sofla

== See also ==
- Iğdır (disambiguation)
