= Kampab Mantqehi Maghan =

Village in Ardabil province, Iran

Kampab Mantqehi Maghan Persian: كمپاب منطقه اي مغان
- Village
- Country: Iran
- Province: Ardabil
- County: Ardabil
- District: Central
- Rural District: Aslan Duz-e Gharbi

Population (2016)
  - Total: 0
- Time zone: UTC+3:30 (IRST)

Kampab Mantqehi Maghan (Persian: كمپاب منطقه اي مغان) (Note: Also romanized as Kampāb Manṭqeh'ī Maghān) is a village in Aslan Duz-e Gharbi Rural District (Note: Formerly Aslan Duz Rural District) of the Central District in Aslan Duz County, Ardabil province, Iran.

== Demographics ==
=== Population ===
At the time of the 2006 National Census, the village's population was 347 in 85 households, when it was in Aslan Duz Rural District (Note: Renamed Aslan Duz-e Gharbi Rural District) of the former Aslan Duz District in Parsabad County. The following census in 2011 counted 233 people in 62 households. The 2016 census measured the population of the village as zero.

In 2019, the district was separated from the county in the establishment of Aslan Duz County. The rural district was transferred to the new Central District and renamed Aslan Duz-e Gharbi Rural District.
