= Nur Mohammad Kandi-ye Vosta =

Village in Ardabil province, Iran

Nur Mohammad Kandi-ye Vosta Persian: نورمحمدكندي وسطي
- Village
- Location within Iran
- Coordinates: 39°28′27″N 47°29′54″E
- Country: Iran
- Province: Ardabil
- County: Ardabil
- District: Central
- Rural District: Aslan Duz-e Sharqi

Population (2016)
  - Total: 307
- Time zone: UTC+3:30 (IRST)

Nur Mohammad Kandi-ye Vosta (Persian: نورمحمدكندي وسطي) (Note: Also romanized as Nūr Moḩammad Kandī-ye Vosţá) is a village in Aslan Duz-e Sharqi Rural District of the Central District in Aslan Duz County, Ardabil province, Iran.

== Demographics ==
=== Population ===
At the time of the 2006 National Census, the village's population was 325 in 57 households, when it was in Aslan Duz Rural District (Note: Renamed Aslan Duz-e Gharbi Rural District) of the former Aslan Duz District in Parsabad County. The following census in 2011 counted 341 people in 88 households. The 2016 census measured the population of the village as 307 people in 97 households.

In 2019, the district was separated from the county in the establishment of Aslan Duz County. The rural district was transferred to the new Central District and renamed Aslan Duz-e Gharbi Rural District. Nur Mohammad Kandi-ye Vosta was transferred to Aslan Duz-e Sharqi Rural District created in the district.
