= Hoseyn Qeshlaqi Hajj Khvajehlu =

Village in Ardabil province, Iran

Hoseyn Qeshlaqi Hajj Khvajehlu Persian: حسين قشلاقي حاج خواجه لو
- Village
- Location within Iran
- Coordinates: 39°28′23″N 47°32′12″E
- Country: Iran
- Province: Ardabil
- County: Ardabil
- District: Central
- Rural District: Aslan Duz-e Sharqi

Population (2016)
  - Total: 226
- Time zone: UTC+3:30 (IRST)

Hoseyn Qeshlaqi Hajj Khvajehlu (Persian: حسين قشلاقي حاج خواجه لو) (Note: Also romanized as Ḩoseyn Qeshlāqī Ḩājj Khvājehlū) is a village in Aslan Duz-e Sharqi Rural District of the Central District in Aslan Duz County, Ardabil province, Iran.

== Demographics ==
=== Population ===
At the time of the 2006 National Census, the village's population was 256 in 46 households, when it was in Aslan Duz Rural District (Note: Renamed Aslan Duz-e Gharbi Rural District) of the former Aslan Duz District in Parsabad County. The following census in 2011 counted 223 people in 56 households. The 2016 census measured the population of the village as 226 people in 61 households.

In 2019, the district was separated from the county in the establishment of Aslan Duz County. The rural district was transferred to the new Central District and renamed Aslan Duz-e Gharbi Rural District. Hoseyn Qeshlaqi Hajj Khvajehlu was transferred to Aslan Duz-e Sharqi Rural District created in the district.
