= Hoseyn Qeshlaqi Gurabazlu =

Village in Ardabil province, Iran

Hoseyn Qeshlaqi Gurabazlu Persian: حسين قشلاقي گورابازلو
- Village
- Location within Iran
- Coordinates: 39°28′10″N 47°32′46″E
- Country: Iran
- Province: Ardabil
- County: Ardabil
- District: Central
- Rural District: Aslan Duz-e Sharqi

Population (2016)
  - Total: 42
- Time zone: UTC+3:30 (IRST)

Hoseyn Qeshlaqi Gurabazlu (Persian: حسين قشلاقي گورابازلو) (Note: Also romanized as Ḩoseyn Qeshlāqī Gūrābāzlū; also known as Ḩoseyn Qeshlāqī) is a village in Aslan Duz-e Sharqi Rural District of the Central District in Aslan Duz County, Ardabil province, Iran.

== Demographics ==
=== Population ===
At the time of the 2006 National Census, the village's population was 28 in four households, when it was in Aslan Duz Rural District (Note: Renamed Aslan Duz-e Gharbi Rural District) of the former Aslan Duz District in Parsabad County. The following census in 2011 counted 24 people in four households. The 2016 census measured the population of the village as 42 people in 10 households.

In 2019, the district was separated from the county in the establishment of Aslan Duz County. The rural district was transferred to the new Central District and renamed Aslan Duz-e Gharbi Rural District. Hoseyn Qeshlaqi Gurabazlu was transferred to Aslan Duz-e Sharqi Rural District created in the district.
