= Qarash Qa Tappehsi-ye Sofla =

Village in Ardabil province, Iran

Qarash Qa Tappehsi-ye Sofla Persian: قارشقاتپه سي سفلي
- Village
- Location within Iran
- Coordinates: 39°23′33″N 47°27′29″E
- Country: Iran
- Province: Ardabil
- County: Ardabil
- District: Central
- Rural District: Aslan Duz-e Gharbi

Population (2016)
  - Total: 157
- Time zone: UTC+3:30 (IRST)

Qarash Qa Tappehsi-ye Sofla (Persian: قارشقاتپه سي سفلي) (Note: Also romanized as Qārāsh Qā Tappephsī-ye Soflá; also known as Qārāsh Qātepsī) is a village in Aslan Duz-e Gharbi Rural District (Note: Formerly Aslan Duz Rural District) of the Central District in Aslan Duz County, Ardabil province, Iran.

== Demographics ==
=== Population ===
At the time of the 2006 National Census, the village's population was 155 in 27 households, when it was in Aslan Duz Rural District (Note: Renamed Aslan Duz-e Gharbi Rural District) of the former Aslan Duz District in Parsabad County. The following census in 2011 counted 151 people in 29 households. The 2016 census measured the population of the village as 157 people in 36 households.

In 2019, the district was separated from the county in the establishment of Aslan Duz County. The rural district was transferred to the new Central District and renamed Aslan Duz-e Gharbi Rural District.
