= Qeshlaq-e Gablu =

Village in Ardabil province, Iran

Qeshlaq-e Gablu Persian: قشلاق گبلو
- Village
- Location within Iran
- Coordinates: 39°23′00″N 47°25′46″E
- Country: Iran
- Province: Ardabil
- County: Ardabil
- District: Central
- Rural District: Aslan Duz-e Gharbi

Population (2016)
  - Total: 51
- Time zone: UTC+3:30 (IRST)

Qeshlaq-e Gablu (Persian: قشلاق گبلو) (Note: Also romanized as Qeshlāq-e Gablū) is a village in Aslan Duz-e Gharbi Rural District (Note: Formerly Aslan Duz Rural District) of the Central District in Aslan Duz County, Ardabil province, Iran.

== Demographics ==
=== Population ===
At the time of the 2006 National Census, the village's population was 49 in 13 households, when it was in Aslan Duz Rural District (Note: Renamed Aslan Duz-e Gharbi Rural District) of the former Aslan Duz District in Parsabad County. The following census in 2011 counted 66 people in 17 households. The 2016 census measured the population of the village as 51 people in 14 households.

In 2019, the district was separated from the county in the establishment of Aslan Duz County. The rural district was transferred to the new Central District and renamed Aslan Duz-e Gharbi Rural District.
