= Khanlar Qeshlaqi-ye Hajj Alam Qoli =

Village in Ardabil province, Iran

Khanlar Qeshlaqi-ye Hajj Alam Qoli Persian: خانلارقشلاقي حاج الم قلي
- Village
- Location within Iran
- Coordinates: 39°28′17″N 47°31′30″E
- Country: Iran
- Province: Ardabil
- County: Ardabil
- District: Central
- Rural District: Aslan Duz-e Sharqi

Population (2016)
  - Total: 274
- Time zone: UTC+3:30 (IRST)

Khanlar Qeshlaqi-ye Hajj Alam Qoli (Persian: خانلارقشلاقي حاج الم قلي) (Note: Also romanized as Khānlar Qeshlāqī-ye Ḩājj Alam Qolī; also known as Khānlar Qeshlāqī and Khānlar Qeshlāqī-ye ‘Olyā) is a village in Aslan Duz-e Sharqi Rural District of the Central District in Aslan Duz County, Ardabil province, Iran.

== Demographics ==
=== Population ===
At the time of the 2006 National Census, the village's population was 242 in 42 households, when it was in Aslan Duz Rural District (Note: Renamed Aslan Duz-e Gharbi Rural District) of the former Aslan Duz District in Parsabad County. The following census in 2011 counted 244 people in 60 households. The 2016 census measured the population of the village as 274 people in 70 households.

In 2019, the district was separated from the county in the establishment of Aslan Duz County. The rural district was transferred to the new Central District and renamed Aslan Duz-e Gharbi Rural District. Khanlar Qeshlaqi-ye Hajj Alam Qoli was transferred to Aslan Duz-e Sharqi Rural District created in the district.
