= Aq Qabaq-e Olya =

Village in Ardabil province, Iran

Aq Qabaq-e Olya Persian: اق قباق عليا
- Village
- Location within Iran
- Coordinates: 39°29′29″N 47°31′19″E
- Country: Iran
- Province: Ardabil
- County: Ardabil
- District: Central
- Rural District: Aslan Duz-e Sharqi

Population (2016)
  - Total: 194
- Time zone: UTC+3:30 (IRST)

Aq Qabaq-e Olya (Persian: اق قباق عليا) (Note: Also romanized as Āq Qabāq-e ‘Olyā; also known as Āq Qabāq) is a village in Aslan Duz-e Sharqi Rural District of the Central District in Aslan Duz County, Ardabil province, Iran.

== Demographics ==
=== Population ===
At the time of the 2006 National Census, the village's population was 196 in 36 households, when it was in Aslan Duz Rural District (Note: Renamed Aslan Duz-e Gharbi Rural District) of the former Aslan Duz District in Parsabad County. The following census in 2011 counted 173 people in 44 households. The 2016 census measured the population of the village as 194 people in 55 households.

In 2019, the district was separated from the county in the establishment of Aslan Duz County. The rural district was transferred to the new Central District and renamed Aslan Duz-e Gharbi Rural District. Aq Qabaq-e Olya was transferred to Aslan Duz-e Sharqi Rural District created in the district.
