= Gedaylu =

Village in Ardabil province, Iran

Gedaylu Persian: گدايلو
- Village
- Location within Iran
- Coordinates: 39°24′05″N 47°25′53″E
- Country: Iran
- Province: Ardabil
- County: Ardabil
- District: Central
- Rural District: Aslan Duz-e Gharbi

Population (2016)
  - Total: 661
- Time zone: UTC+3:30 (IRST)

Gedaylu (Persian: گدايلو) (Note: Also romanized as Gedāylū; also known as Gedāylī) is a village in, and the capital of, Aslan Duz-e Gharbi Rural District (Note: Formerly Aslan Duz Rural District) in the Central District of Aslan Duz County, Ardabil province, Iran. The rural district was previously administered from the city of Aslan Duz.

== Demographics ==
=== Population ===
At the time of the 2006 National Census, the village's population was 587 in 95 households, when it was in Aslan Duz Rural District (Note: Renamed Aslan Duz-e Gharbi Rural District) of the former Aslan Duz District in Parsabad County. The following census in 2011 counted 552 people in 136 households. The 2016 census measured the population of the village as 661 people in 172 households.

In 2019, the district was separated from the county in the establishment of Aslan Duz County. The rural district was transferred to the new Central District and renamed Aslan Duz-e Gharbi Rural District.
