= Khanlar Qeshlaqi Hajj Bala Beyglu =

Village in Ardabil province, Iran

Khanlar Qeshlaqi Hajj Bala Beyglu Persian: خانلرقشلاقي حاج بالابيگ لو
- Village
- Location within Iran
- Coordinates: 39°28′13″N 47°30′30″E
- Country: Iran
- Province: Ardabil
- County: Ardabil
- District: Central
- Rural District: Aslan Duz-e Sharqi

Population (2016)
  - Total: 218
- Time zone: UTC+3:30 (IRST)

Khanlar Qeshlaqi Hajj Bala Beyglu (Persian: خانلرقشلاقي حاج بالابيگ لو) (Note: Also romanized as Khānlar Qeshlāqī Ḩājj Bālā Beyglū; also known as Khānlar Qeshlāqī-ye Soflá) is a village in Aslan Duz-e Sharqi Rural District of the Central District in Aslan Duz County, Ardabil province, Iran.

== Demographics ==
=== Population ===
At the time of the 2006 National Census, the village's population was 166 in 26 households, when it was in Aslan Duz Rural District (Note: Renamed Aslan Duz-e Gharbi Rural District) of the former Aslan Duz District in Parsabad County. The following census in 2011 counted 156 people in 35 households. The 2016 census measured the population of the village as 218 people in 63 households.

In 2019, the district was separated from the county in the establishment of Aslan Duz County. The rural district was transferred to the new Central District and renamed Aslan Duz-e Gharbi Rural District. Khanlar Qeshlaqi Hajj Bala Beyglu was transferred to Aslan Duz-e Sharqi Rural District created in the district.
