= Aq Qabaq-e Vosta =

Village in Ardabil province, Iran

Aq Qabaq-e Vosta Persian: اق قباق وسطي
- Village
- Location within Iran
- Coordinates: 39°28′54″N 47°32′19″E
- Country: Iran
- Province: Ardabil
- County: Ardabil
- District: Central
- Rural District: Aslan Duz-e Sharqi

Population (2016)
  - Total: 125
- Time zone: UTC+3:30 (IRST)

Aq Qabaq-e Vosta (Persian: اق قباق وسطي) (Note: Also romanized as Āq Qabāq-e Vosţá; also known as Āq Qabāq) is a village in Aslan Duz-e Sharqi Rural District of the Central District in Aslan Duz County, Ardabil province, Iran.

== Demographics ==
=== Population ===
At the time of the 2006 National Census, the village's population was 123 in 26 households, when it was in Aslan Duz Rural District (Note: Renamed Aslan Duz-e Gharbi Rural District) of the former Aslan Duz District in Parsabad County. The following census in 2011 counted 94 people in 27 households. The 2016 census measured the population of the village as 125 people in 41 households.

In 2019, the district was separated from the county in the establishment of Aslan Duz County. The rural district was transferred to the new Central District and renamed Aslan Duz-e Gharbi Rural District. Aq Qabaq-e Vosta was transferred to Aslan Duz-e Sharqi Rural District created in the district.
