= Qeshlaq-e Seyf Khanlu =

Qeshlaq-e Seyf Khanlu (Persian: قشلاق سيف خانلو) may refer to:

- Qeshlaq-e Seyf Khanlu 1
- Qeshlaq-e Seyf Khanlu 2
