= Hoseyn Qeshlaqi =

Hoseyn Qeshlaqi (Persian: حسين قشلاقي) may refer to:

- Hoseyn Qeshlaqi Gurabazlu
- Hoseyn Qeshlaqi Hajj Khvajehlu
