= Khanlar Qeshlaqi =

Khanlar Qeshlaqi (Persian: خانلرقشلاقي) may refer to:

- Khanlar Qeshlaqi Hajj Bala Beyglu
- Khanlar Qeshlaqi-ye Hajj Alam Qoli
