= Aq Qabaq-e Sofla =

Village in Ardabil province, Iran

Aq Qabaq-e Sofla Persian: اق قباق سفلي
- Village
- Location within Iran
- Coordinates: 39°29′02″N 47°32′13″E
- Country: Iran
- Province: Ardabil
- County: Ardabil
- District: Central
- Rural District: Aslan Duz-e Sharqi

Population (2016)
  - Total: 978
- Time zone: UTC+3:30 (IRST)

Aq Qabaq-e Sofla (Persian: اق قباق سفلي) (Note: Also romanized as Āq Qabāq-e Soflá; also known as Āq Qabāq) is a village in, and the capital of, Aslan Duz-e Sharqi Rural District in the Central District of Aslan Duz County, Ardabil province, Iran.

== Demographics ==
=== Population ===
At the time of the 2006 National Census, the village's population was 972 in 159 households, when it was in Aslan Duz Rural District (Note: Renamed Aslan Duz-e Gharbi Rural District) of the former Aslan Duz District in Parsabad County. The following census in 2011 counted 866 people in 216 households. The 2016 census measured the population of the village as 978 people in 284 households. It was the most populous village in its rural district.

In 2019, the district was separated from the county in the establishment of Aslan Duz County. The rural district was transferred to the new Central District and renamed Aslan Duz-e Gharbi Rural District. Aq Qabaq-e Sofla was transferred to Aslan Duz-e Sharqi Rural District created in the district.
