= Qareh Qabaq =

Qareh Qabaq (Persian: قره قباق) may refer to:

- Qareh Qabaq-e Olya
- Qareh Qabaq-e Sofla
