= Maqsudlu-ye Vosta =

Village in Ardabil province, Iran

Maqsudlu-ye Vosta Persian: مقصودلوي وسطي
- Village
- Location within Iran
- Coordinates: 39°28′15″N 47°28′57″E
- Country: Iran
- Province: Ardabil
- County: Ardabil
- District: Central
- Rural District: Aslan Duz-e Gharbi

Population (2016)
  - Total: 261
- Time zone: UTC+3:30 (IRST)

Maqsudlu-ye Vosta (Persian: مقصودلوي وسطي) (Note: Also romanized as Maqşūdlū-ye Vosţá; also known as Maqşūdlū) is a village in Aslan Duz-e Gharbi Rural District (Note: Formerly Aslan Duz Rural District) of the Central District in Aslan Duz County, Ardabil province, Iran.

== Demographics ==
=== Population ===
At the time of the 2006 National Census, the village's population was 279 in 52 households, when it was in Aslan Duz Rural District (Note: Renamed Aslan Duz-e Gharbi Rural District) of the former Aslan Duz District in Parsabad County. The following census in 2011 counted 256 people in 72 households. The 2016 census measured the population of the village as 261 people in 84 households.

In 2019, the district was separated from the county in the establishment of Aslan Duz County. The rural district was transferred to the new Central District and renamed Aslan Duz-e Gharbi Rural District.
