= Buzcheh-ye Olya =

Village in Ardabil province, Iran

Buzcheh-ye Olya Persian: بوزچه عليا
- Village
- Location within Iran
- Coordinates: 39°22′31″N 47°27′37″E
- Country: Iran
- Province: Ardabil
- County: Ardabil
- District: Central
- Rural District: Aslan Duz-e Gharbi

Population (2016)
  - Total: 170
- Time zone: UTC+3:30 (IRST)

Buzcheh-ye Olya (Persian: بوزچه عليا) (Note: Also romanized as Būzcheh-ye ‘Olyā; also known as Būjeh-ye Bālā and Būzjeh-ye ‘Olyā) is a village in Aslan Duz-e Gharbi Rural District (Note: Formerly Aslan Duz Rural District) of the Central District in Aslan Duz County, Ardabil province, Iran. The village is populated by the Kurdish Chalabianlu tribe.

== Demographics ==
=== Population ===
At the time of the 2006 National Census, the village's population was 122 in 26 households, when it was in Aslan Duz Rural District (Note: Renamed Aslan Duz-e Gharbi Rural District) of the former Aslan Duz District in Parsabad County. The following census in 2011 counted 114 people in 31 households. The 2016 census measured the population of the village as 170 people in 50 households.

In 2019, the district was separated from the county in the establishment of Aslan Duz County. The rural district was transferred to the new Central District and renamed Aslan Duz-e Gharbi Rural District.
