= Asad Qeshlaqi =

Asad Qeshlaqi (Persian: اسدقشلاقي) may refer to:

- Asad Qeshlaqi 1
- Asad Qeshlaqi 2
- Asad Qeshlaqi 3
