= Gemi =

Gemi or GEMI may refer to:

- Gemi, Araç, a village in the Araç District of Kastamonu Province in Turkey
- Global Exchange of Military Information
- Gujarat Environment Management Institute
