= Buzcheh =

Buzcheh (Persian: بوزچه), also rendered as Buzjeh or Bujeh or Buju, may refer to:

- Buzcheh-ye Olya
- Buzcheh-ye Sofla
- Buzcheh-ye Vosta
