= Qareh Qabaq-e Olya =

Village in Ardabil province, Iran

Qareh Qabaq-e Olya Persian: قره قباق عليا
- Village
- Location within Iran
- Coordinates: 39°25′01″N 47°23′21″E
- Country: Iran
- Province: Ardabil
- County: Ardabil
- District: Central
- Rural District: Aslan Duz-e Gharbi

Population (2016)
  - Total: 98
- Time zone: UTC+3:30 (IRST)

Qareh Qabaq-e Olya (Persian: قره قباق عليا) (Note: Also romanized as Qareh Qābāq-e ‘Olyā; also known as Azhdarbeyglū (اژدربيگلو)) is a village in Aslan Duz-e Gharbi Rural District (Note: Formerly Aslan Duz Rural District) of the Central District in Aslan Duz County, Ardabil province, Iran.

== Demographics ==
=== Population ===
At the time of the 2006 National Census, the village's population was 82 in 16 households, when it was in Aslan Duz Rural District (Note: Renamed Aslan Duz-e Gharbi Rural District) of the former Aslan Duz District in Parsabad County. The following census in 2011 counted 61 people in 15 households. The 2016 census measured the population of the village as 98 people in 26 households.

In 2019, the district was separated from the county in the establishment of Aslan Duz County. The rural district was transferred to the new Central District and renamed Aslan Duz-e Gharbi Rural District.
