= Qeshlaq-e Seyf Khanlu-ye Do =

Village in Ardabil province, Iran

Qeshlaq-e Seyf Khanlu-ye Do Persian: قشلاق سيف خانلو2
- Village
- Location within Iran
- Coordinates: 39°20′58″N 47°27′21″E
- Country: Iran
- Province: Ardabil
- County: Ardabil
- District: Central
- Rural District: Aslan Duz-e Gharbi

Population (2016)
  - Total: 143
- Time zone: UTC+3:30 (IRST)

Qeshlaq-e Seyf Khanlu-ye Do (Persian: قشلاق سيف خانلو2) (Note: Also romanized as Qeshlāq-e Seyf Khānlū-ye Do) is a village in Aslan Duz-e Gharbi Rural District (Note: Formerly Aslan Duz Rural District) of the Central District in Aslan Duz County, Ardabil province, Iran.

== Demographics ==
=== Population ===
At the time of the 2006 National Census, the village's population was 30 in seven households, when it was in Aslan Duz Rural District (Note: Renamed Aslan Duz-e Gharbi Rural District) of the former Aslan Duz District in Parsabad County. The following census in 2011 counted 147 people in 37 households. The 2016 census measured the population of the village as 143 people in 39 households.

In 2019, the district was separated from the county in the establishment of Aslan Duz County. The rural district was transferred to the new Central District and renamed Aslan Duz-e Gharbi Rural District.
