= Ider =

Ider may refer to:

== Places ==
- Ider, Iran (disambiguation), places in Iran
- Ider, Zavkhan, a sum and small town in Mongolia
- Ider, Alabama, United States

== Music ==
- Ider (band), an English singer-songwriter duo

== Other ==
- Ider River
