= Kışlaköy =

Kışlaköy (literally "barracks village" in Turkish) may refer to the following places in Turkey:

- Kışlaköy, Araç
- Kışlaköy, Bartın
- Kışlaköy, Elmalı
- Kışlaköy, Mut
- Kışlaköy, Narman
- Kışlaköy, Sungurlu

== See also ==
- Kışla (disambiguation)
