= Qareh Qabaq-e Sofla =

Qareh Qabaq-e Sofla قره قباق سفلي
- Village
- Location within Iran
- Coordinates: 39°29′35″N 47°31′57″E
- Country: Iran
- Province: Ardabil
- County: Parsabad
- Bakhsh: Aslan Duz
- Rural District: Aslan Duz

Population (2006)
  - Total: 807
- Time zone: UTC+3:30 (IRST)

Qareh Qabaq-e Sofla (Persian: قره قباق سفلي, also Romanized as Qareh Qābāq-e Soflā) is a village in Aslan Duz Rural District, Aslan Duz District, Parsabad County, Ardabil Province, Iran. At the 2006 census, its population was 807, in 175 families.
