= Iğdır (disambiguation) =

Iğdır is the capital city of Iğdır Province, Turkey.

Iğdır may also refer to the following places in Turkey:

- Iğdır District or Merkez, the district containing the city
- Iğdır Province, the province containing the district and city
- Iğdır University, a university in the city
- Iğdır Airport, a public airport in the province
- Iğdır (electoral district), a constituency of the Grand National Assembly of Turkey
- İğdir, Araç, a village in Kastamonu Province
- Iğdır, Bayburt, a village in Bayburt Province
- Iğdır, Cumayeri, a village in Düzce Province
- İğdir, Kızılcahamam, a neighbourhood in Ankara Province
- İğdir, Kurşunlu, a village in Çankırı Province
- Iğdır, Mersin, a village in Mersin Province
- İğdir, Yapraklı, a neighbourhood in Çankırı Province
- İğdir, Yeşilova, a village in Burdur Province
- Iğdır Plain or Ararat Plain, a large flatland in the Armenian Highlands
- İğdir Tunnel, on the O-22 (E90) motorway in Bursa Province

== See also ==
- Igdir, Iran, a village in West Azerbaijan Province
