= Doğanpınar =

Doğanpınar can refer to the following villages in Turkey:

- Doğanpınar, Araç
- Doğanpınar, Bandırma
