= Karacık =

Karacık can refer to:

- Karacık, Araç
- Karacık, Bismil
