= Buju =

Buju may refer to:

- Buju, Iran (disambiguation)
- Jewish Buddhist
- Buju Banton, Jamaican reggae dancehall musician
- Bnxn, formerly known as Buju, Nigerian singer
