= Çamaltı =

Çamaltı can refer to the following villages in Turkey:

- Çamaltı, Araç
- Çamaltı, Bartın
- Çamaltı, Cide
