= Kurlar =

Kurlar (Persian: كورلر or كورلار) may refer to:

- Kurlar, Ardabil (كورلار - Kūrlār)
- Kurlar, Golestan (كورلر - Kūrlar)
