= Doğanca =

Doğanca may refer to the following villages in Turkey:

- Doğanca, Araç
- Doğanca, Gazipaşa
- Doğanca, Samsat
