= Şehrimanlar, Araç =

Village in Turkey

Şehrimanlar
- Village
- Location in Turkey
- Coordinates: 41°10′23″N 33°04′15″E
- Country: Turkey
- Province: Kastamonu
- District: Araç
- Population (2021): 63
- Time zone: UTC+3 (TRT)

Şehrimanlar is a village in the Araç District of Kastamonu Province in Turkey. Its population is 63 (2021).
