= Çavuşköy, Araç =

Village in Kastamonu, Turkey

Çavuşköy
- Village
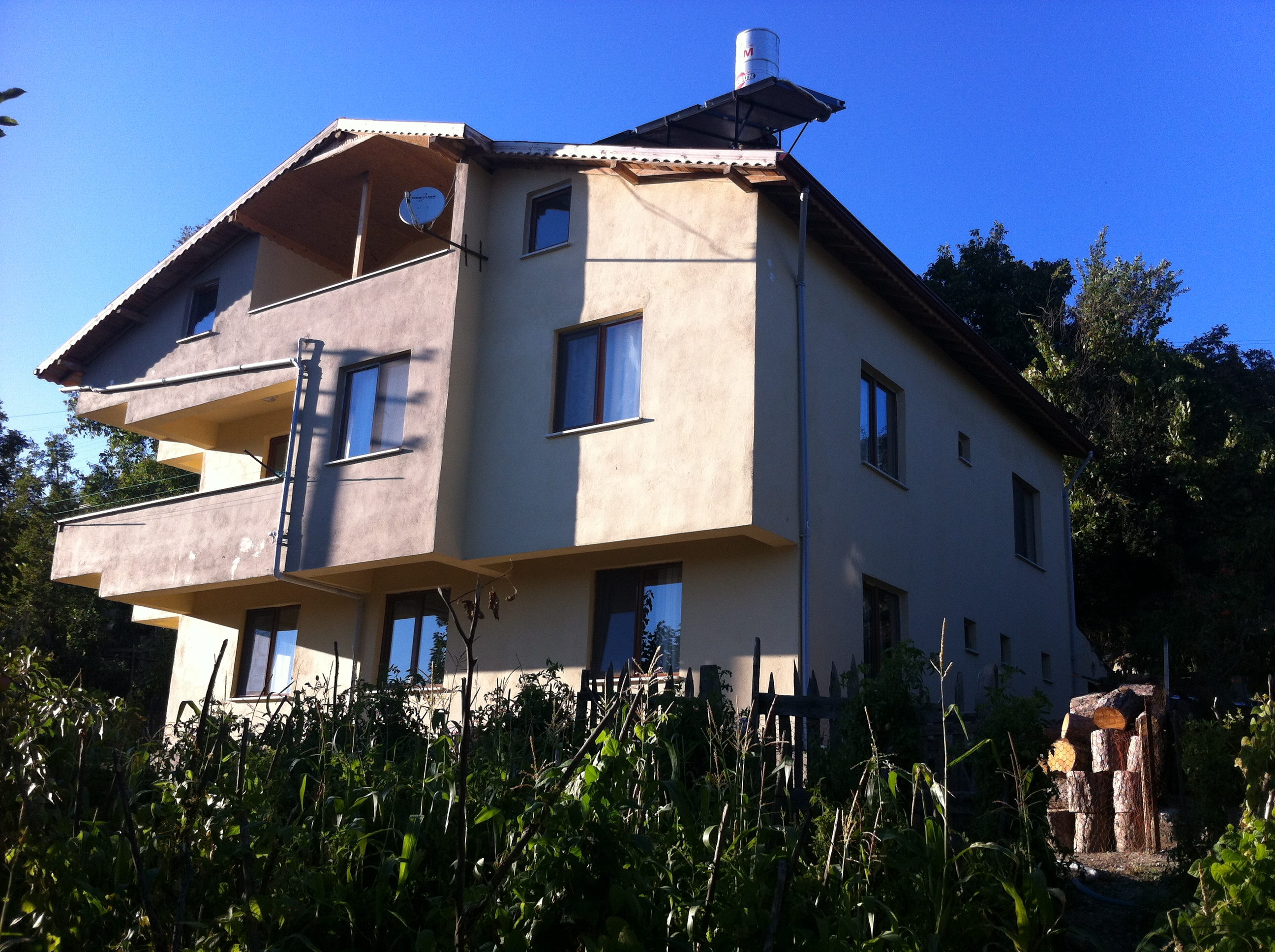
- A house in Çavuşköy

- Location within Turkey
- Coordinates: 41°04′49″N 33°16′10″E
- Country: Turkey
- Province: Kastamonu
- District: Araç
- Population (2021): 114
- Time zone: UTC+3 (TRT)

Çavuşköy is a village in the Araç District of Kastamonu Province in Turkey. Its population is 114 (2021).
