= Kızılsaray, Araç =

Village in Turkey

Kızılsaray
- Village
- Location in Turkey
- Coordinates: 41.35°N 33.35°E
- Country: Turkey
- Province: Kastamonu
- District: Araç
- Population (2021): 80
- Time zone: UTC+3 (TRT)

Kızılsaray is a village in the Araç District of Kastamonu Province in Turkey. Its population is 80 (2021).
