= Recepbey, Araç =

Village in Turkey

Recepbey
- Village
- Location in Turkey
- Coordinates: 41°09′54″N 33°06′59″E
- Country: Turkey
- Province: Kastamonu
- District: Araç
- Population (2021): 59
- Time zone: UTC+3 (TRT)

Recepbey is a village in the Araç District of Kastamonu Province in Turkey. Its population is 59 (2021).
