= Balçıkhisar, Araç =

Village in Turkey

Balçıkhisar
- Village
- Location in Turkey
- Coordinates: 41.213°N 33.097°E
- Country: Turkey
- Province: Kastamonu
- District: Araç
- Population (2021): 182
- Time zone: UTC+3 (TRT)

Balçıkhisar is a village in the Araç District of Kastamonu Province in Turkey. Its population is 182 (2021).
