= Araç =

- Municipality
- Location within Turkey
- Coordinates: 41°14′32″N 33°19′42″E
- Country: Turkey
- Province: Kastamonu
- District: Araç

Government
  - Mayor: Süleyman Yazkan (AKP)
- Elevation: 764 m (2,507 ft)
- Population (2021): 6,464
- Time zone: UTC+3 (TRT)
- Area code: 0366
- Climate: Cfb
- Website: www.arac.bel.tr

Araç is a town in the Kastamonu Province in the Black Sea region of Turkey. It is the seat of Araç District. Its population is 6,464 (2021). The town lies at an elevation of 764 m (2,507 ft).
