= Karakaya, Araç =

Village in Turkey

Karakaya
- Village
- Location in Turkey
- Coordinates: 41.296°N 33.101°E
- Country: Turkey
- Province: Kastamonu
- District: Araç
- Population (2021): 110
- Time zone: UTC+3 (TRT)

Karakaya is a village in the Araç District of Kastamonu Province in Turkey. Its population is 110 (2021).
