= Kemerler, Araç =

Village in Turkey

Kemerler
- Village
- Location in Turkey
- Coordinates: 41.087°N 33.385°E
- Country: Turkey
- Province: Kastamonu
- District: Araç
- Population (2021): 35
- Time zone: UTC+3 (TRT)

Kemerler is a village in the Araç District of Kastamonu Province in Turkey. Its population is 35 (2021).
