= Yukarıyazı, Araç =

Village in Turkey

Yukarıyazı
- Village
- Location in Turkey
- Coordinates: 41°13′26″N 33°21′32″E
- Country: Turkey
- Province: Kastamonu
- District: Araç
- Population (2021): 49
- Time zone: UTC+3 (TRT)

Yukarıyazı is a village in the Araç District of Kastamonu Province in Turkey. Its population is 49 (2021).
