= Aktaş, Araç =

Village in Turkey

Aktaş
- Village
- Location in Turkey
- Coordinates: 41.158°N 33.391°E
- Country: Turkey
- Province: Kastamonu
- District: Araç
- Population (2021): 70
- Time zone: UTC+3 (TRT)

Aktaş is a village in the Araç District of Kastamonu Province in Turkey. Its population is 70 (2021).
