= Çubukludere, Araç =

Village in Turkey

Çubukludere
- Village
- Location in Turkey
- Coordinates: 41°16′15″N 33°08′34″E
- Country: Turkey
- Province: Kastamonu
- District: Araç
- Population (2021): 85
- Time zone: UTC+3 (TRT)

Çubukludere is a village in the Araç District of Kastamonu Province in Turkey. Its population is 85 (2021).
