= Kızılören, Araç =

Village in Turkey

Kızılören
- Village
- Location in Turkey
- Coordinates: 41.265°N 33.015°E
- Country: Turkey
- Province: Kastamonu
- District: Araç
- Population (2021): 62
- Time zone: UTC+3 (TRT)

Kızılören is a village in the Araç District of Kastamonu Province in Turkey. Its population is 62 (2021).
