= Gökçeçat, Araç =

Village in Turkey

Gökçeçat
- Village
- Location in Turkey
- Coordinates: 41°13′17″N 33°12′51″E
- Country: Turkey
- Province: Kastamonu
- District: Araç
- Population (2021): 87
- Time zone: UTC+3 (TRT)

Gökçeçat is a village in the Araç District of Kastamonu Province in Turkey. Its population is 87 (2021).
