= Belkavak, Araç =

Village in Turkey

Belkavak
- Village
- Location in Turkey
- Coordinates: 41.198°N 33.413°E
- Country: Turkey
- Province: Kastamonu
- District: Araç
- Population (2021): 125
- Time zone: UTC+3 (TRT)

Belkavak is a village in the Araç District of Kastamonu Province in Turkey. Its population is 125 (2021).
