= Karaçalar, Araç =

Village in Turkey

Karaçalar
- Village
- Location in Turkey
- Coordinates: 41.202°N 32.982°E
- Country: Turkey
- Province: Kastamonu
- District: Araç
- Population (2021): 96
- Time zone: UTC+3 (TRT)

Karaçalar (also: Karacalar) is a village in the Araç District of Kastamonu Province in Turkey. Its population is 96 (2021).
