= Akgeçit, Araç =

Village in Turkey

Akgeçit
- Village
- Location in Turkey
- Coordinates: 41.216°N 32.947°E
- Country: Turkey
- Province: Kastamonu
- District: Araç
- Population (2021): 123
- Time zone: UTC+3 (TRT)

Akgeçit is a village in the Araç District of Kastamonu Province in Turkey. Its population is 123 (2021).
