= Tuzaklı, Araç =

Village in Turkey

Tuzaklı
- Village
- Location in Turkey
- Coordinates: 41°17′44″N 33°22′39″E
- Country: Turkey
- Province: Kastamonu
- District: Araç
- Population (2021): 50
- Time zone: UTC+3 (TRT)

Tuzaklı is a village in the Araç District of Kastamonu Province in Turkey. Its population is 50 (2021).
