= Tokatlı, Araç =

Village in Turkey

Tokatlı
- Village
- Location in Turkey
- Coordinates: 41°12′06″N 33°01′37″E
- Country: Turkey
- Province: Kastamonu
- District: Araç
- Population (2021): 69
- Time zone: UTC+3 (TRT)

Tokatlı is a village in the Araç District of Kastamonu Province in Turkey. Its population is 69 (2021).
