= Hanözü, Araç =

Village in Turkey

Hanözü
- Village
- Location in Turkey
- Coordinates: 41.175°N 33.157°E
- Country: Turkey
- Province: Kastamonu
- District: Araç
- Population (2021): 95
- Time zone: UTC+3 (TRT)

Hanözü is a village in the Araç District of Kastamonu Province in Turkey. Its population is 95 (2021).
