= Müslimler, Araç =

Village in Turkey

Müslimler
- Village
- Location in Turkey
- Coordinates: 41°13′04″N 33°03′12″E
- Country: Turkey
- Province: Kastamonu
- District: Araç
- Population (2021): 93
- Time zone: UTC+3 (TRT)

Müslimler is a village in the Araç District of Kastamonu Province in Turkey. Its population is 93 (2021).

== Gallery ==
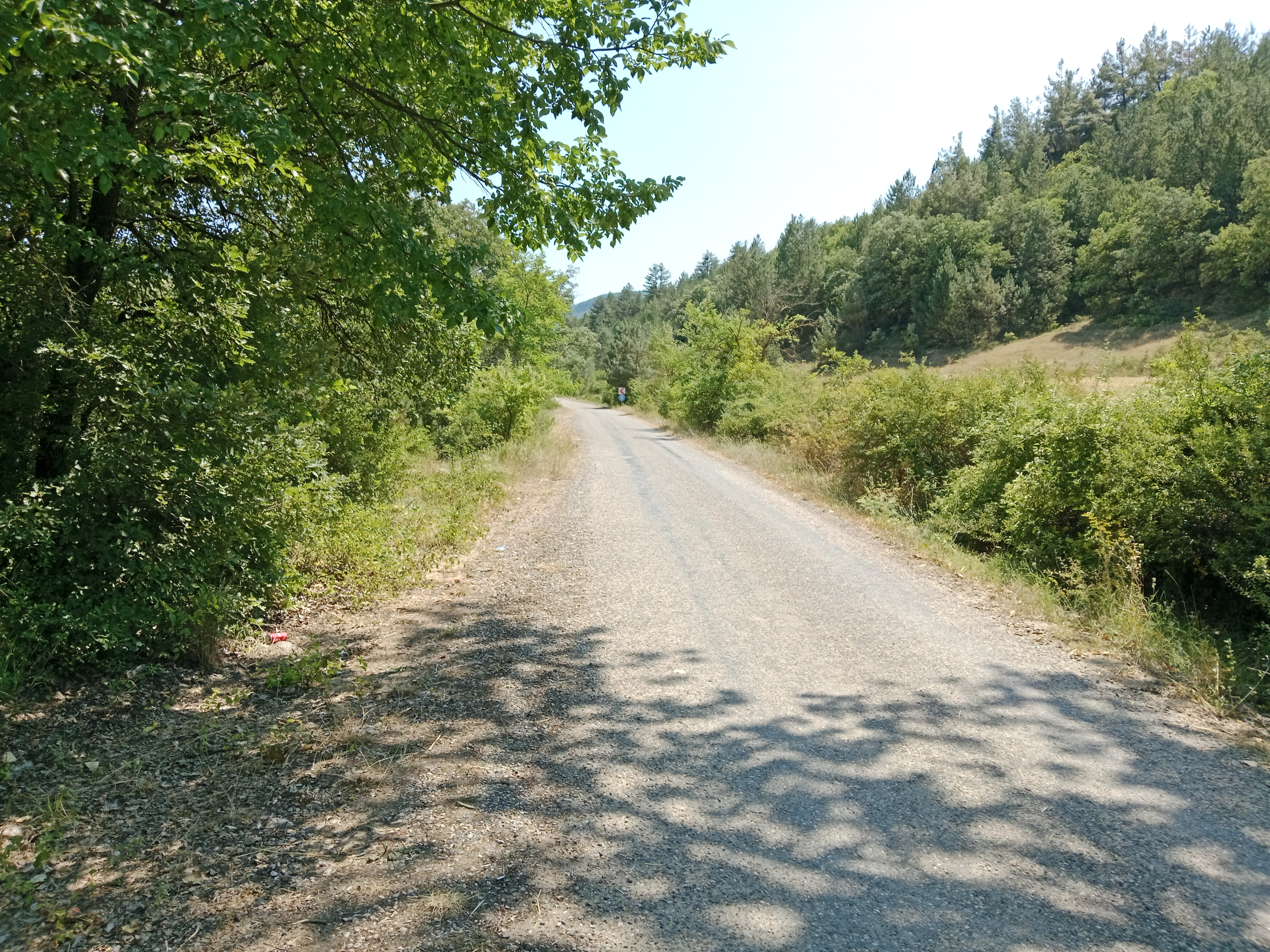
The road leading to the village

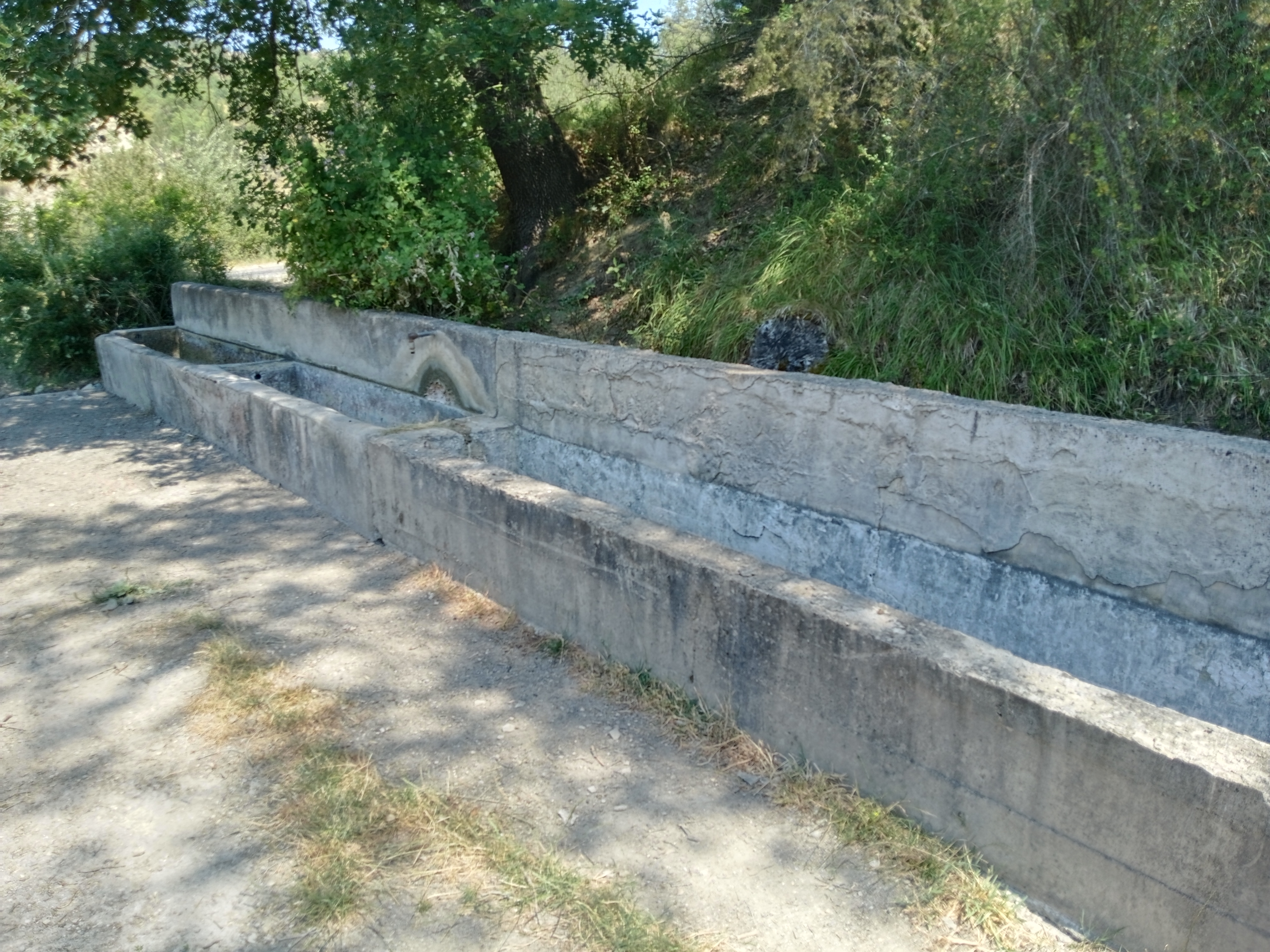
The fountain on the road of the village

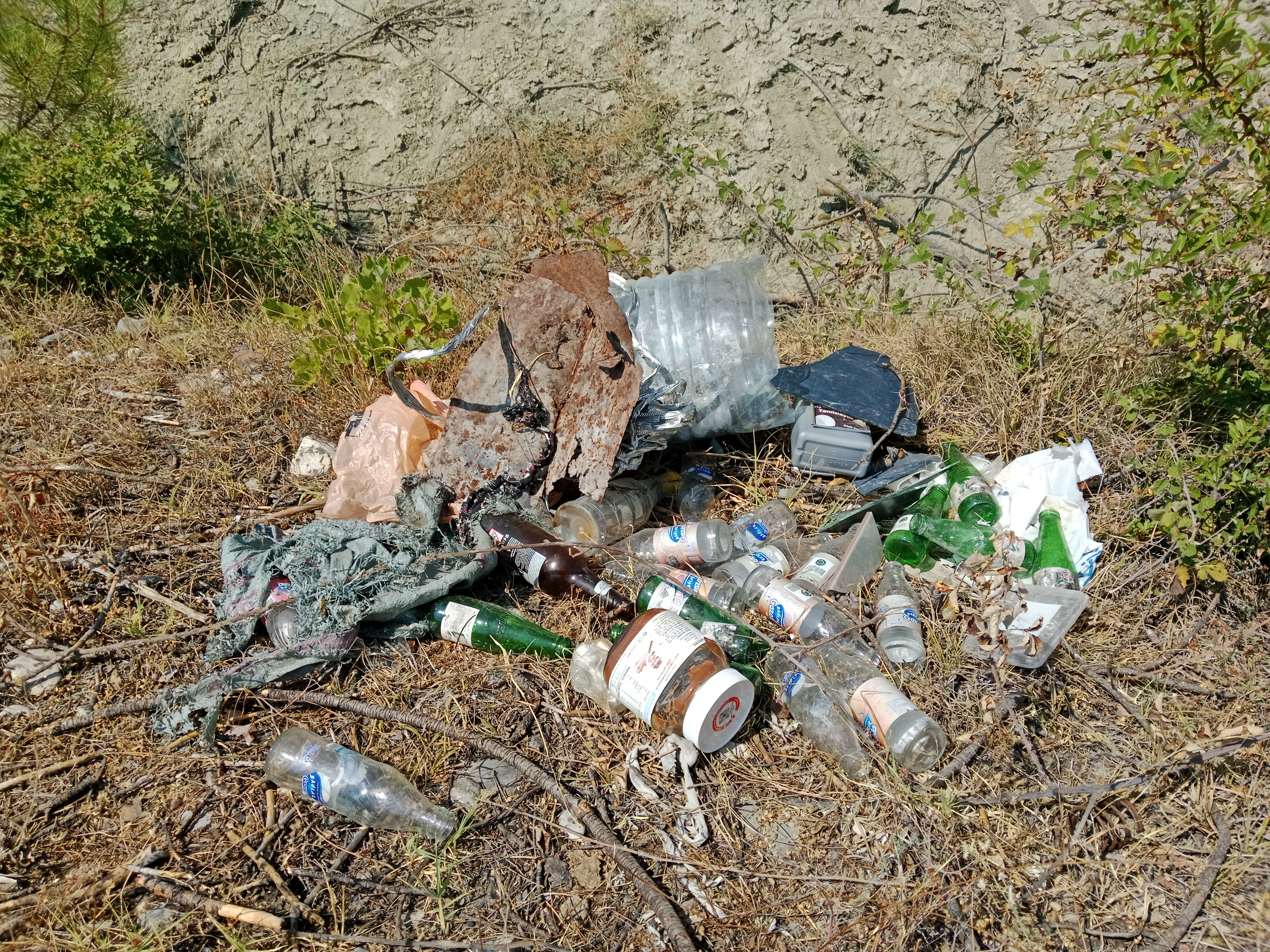
Trash thrown near the road

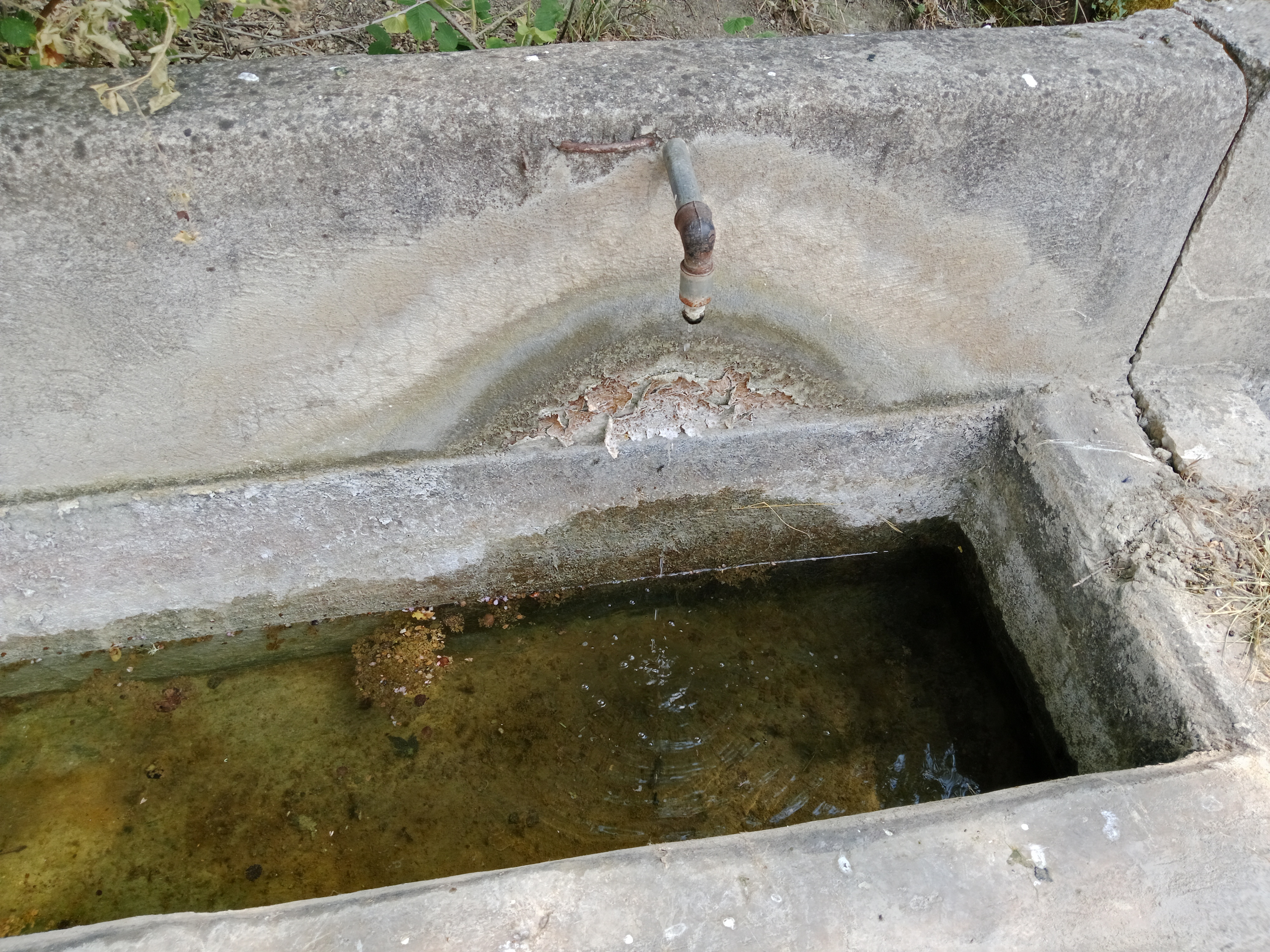
The fountain on the road of the village
