= Gülükler, Araç =

Village in Turkey

Gülükler
- Village
- Location in Turkey
- Coordinates: 41.200°N 33.008°E
- Country: Turkey
- Province: Kastamonu
- District: Araç
- Population (2021): 79
- Time zone: UTC+3 (TRT)

Gülükler is a village in the Araç District of Kastamonu Province in Turkey. Its population is 79 (2021).
