= Özbel, Araç =

Village in Turkey

Özbel
- Village
- Location in Turkey
- Coordinates: 41°13′22″N 33°20′14″E
- Country: Turkey
- Province: Kastamonu
- District: Araç
- Population (2021): 53
- Time zone: UTC+3 (TRT)

Özbel is a village in the Araç District of Kastamonu Province in Turkey. Its population is 53 (2021).
