= Damla, Araç =

Village in Turkey

Damla
- Village
- Location in Turkey
- Coordinates: 41°11′48″N 33°04′10″E
- Country: Turkey
- Province: Kastamonu
- District: Araç
- Population (2021): 61
- Time zone: UTC+3 (TRT)

Damla is a village in the Araç District of Kastamonu Province in Turkey. Its population is 61 (2021).
