= Tellikoz, Araç =

Village in Turkey

Tellikoz
- Village
- Location in Turkey
- Coordinates: 41°11′47″N 33°06′56″E
- Country: Turkey
- Province: Kastamonu
- District: Araç
- Population (2021): 78
- Time zone: UTC+3 (TRT)

Tellikoz is a village in the Araç District of Kastamonu Province in Turkey. Its population is 78 (2021).
