= Ömersin, Araç =

Village in Turkey

Ömersin
- Village
- Location in Turkey
- Coordinates: 41°20′02″N 33°31′56″E
- Country: Turkey
- Province: Kastamonu
- District: Araç
- Population (2021): 60
- Time zone: UTC+3 (TRT)

Ömersin is a village in the Araç District of Kastamonu Province in Turkey. Its population is 60 (2021).
