= Çukurpelit, Araç =

Village in Turkey

Çukurpelit
- Village
- Location in Turkey
- Coordinates: 41°16′40″N 33°26′40″E
- Country: Turkey
- Province: Kastamonu
- District: Araç
- Population (2021): 86
- Time zone: UTC+3 (TRT)

Çukurpelit is a village in the Araç District of Kastamonu Province in Turkey. Its population is 86 (2021).
