= Güzlük, Araç =

Village in Turkey

Güzlük
- Village
- Location in Turkey
- Coordinates: 41°03′04″N 33°20′59″E
- Country: Turkey
- Province: Kastamonu
- District: Araç
- Population (2021): 75
- Time zone: UTC+3 (TRT)

Güzlük is a village in the Araç District of Kastamonu Province in Turkey. Its population is 75 (2021).
