= Susuz, Araç =

Village in Turkey

Susuz
- Village
- Location in Turkey
- Coordinates: 41°03′02″N 33°17′43″E
- Country: Turkey
- Province: Kastamonu
- District: Araç
- Population (2021): 195
- Time zone: UTC+3 (TRT)

Susuz is a village in the Araç District of Kastamonu Province in Turkey. Its population is 195 (2021).
