= Üçpınar, Araç =

Village in Turkey

Üçpınar
- Village
- Location in Turkey
- Coordinates: 41.208°N 33.057°E
- Country: Turkey
- Province: Kastamonu
- District: Araç
- Population (2021): 20
- Time zone: UTC+3 (TRT)

Üçpınar is a village in the Araç District of Kastamonu Province in Turkey. Its population is 20 (2021).
