= Kirazlı, Araç =

Village in Turkey

Kirazlı
- Village
- Location in Turkey
- Coordinates: 41°06′18″N 33°13′18″E
- Country: Turkey
- Province: Kastamonu
- District: Araç
- Population (2021): 72
- Time zone: UTC+3 (TRT)

Kirazlı is a village in the Araç District of Kastamonu Province in Turkey. Its population is 72 (2021).
