= Erekli, Araç =

Village in Turkey

Erekli
- Village
- Location in Turkey
- Coordinates: 41.241°N 33.165°E
- Country: Turkey
- Province: Kastamonu
- District: Araç
- Population (2021): 66
- Time zone: UTC+3 (TRT)

Erekli is a village in the Araç District of Kastamonu Province in Turkey. Its population is 66 (2021).
