= Ulucak, Araç =

Village in Turkey

Ulucak
- Village
- Location in Turkey
- Coordinates: 41.295°N 33.258°E
- Country: Turkey
- Province: Kastamonu
- District: Araç
- Population (2021): 45
- Time zone: UTC+3 (TRT)

Ulucak (also: Olucak) is a village in the Araç District of Kastamonu Province in Turkey. Its population is 45 (2021).
