= Kıyan, Araç =

Village in Turkey

Kıyan
- Village
- Location in Turkey
- Coordinates: 41°13′46″N 33°11′01″E
- Country: Turkey
- Province: Kastamonu
- District: Araç
- Population (2021): 114
- Time zone: UTC+3 (TRT)

Kıyan is a village in the Araç District of Kastamonu Province in Turkey. Its population is 114 (2021).
