= Kayaören, Araç =

Village in Turkey

Kayaören
- Village
- Location in Turkey
- Coordinates: 41.078°N 33.077°E
- Country: Turkey
- Province: Kastamonu
- District: Araç
- Population (2021): 20
- Time zone: UTC+3 (TRT)

Kayaören is a village in the Araç District of Kastamonu Province in Turkey. It had a population of 20 as of 2021.
