= Aslan Duz-e Sharqi Rural District =

Rural district in Ardabil province, Iran

Aslan Duz-e Sharqi Rural District Persian: دهستان اصلاندوز شرقی
- Rural District
- Location within Iran
- Coordinates: 39°28′00″N 47°33′25″E
- Country: Iran
- Province: Ardabil
- County: Aslan Duz
- District: Central
- Established: 2019
- Capital: Aq Qabaq-e Sofla
- Time zone: UTC+3:30 (IRST)

Aslan Duz-e Sharqi Rural District (Persian: دهستان اصلاندوز شرقی) is in the Central District of Aslan Duz County, Ardabil province, Iran. Its capital is the village of Aq Qabaq-e Sofla, whose population at the time of the 2016 National Census was 978 people.

== History ==
In 2019, Aslan Duz District was separated from Parsabad County in the establishment of Aslan Duz County, and Aslan Duz-e Sharqi Rural District was created in the new Central District.

=== Other villages in the rural district ===
- Aq Qabaq-e Olya
- Aq Qabaq-e Vosta
- Gurshad Kandi
- Hajj Amir Kandi
- Hoseyn Qeshlaqi Gurabazlu
- Hoseyn Qeshlaqi Hajj Khvajehlu
- Khanlar Qeshlaqi Hajj Bala Beyglu
- Khanlar Qeshlaqi-ye Hajj Alam Qoli
- Mahbub Kandi
- Nur Mohammad Kandi-ye Olya
- Nur Mohammad Kandi-ye Sofla
- Nur Mohammad Kandi-ye Vosta
- Omranabad
- Qelich Khan Kandi
- Qeshlaq-e Balaja
- Qeshlaq-e Hajj Aqaqoli
- Qeshlaq-e Hajj Aspar Kandi
- Qeshlaq-e Hajji Bayandar
- Qeshlaq-e Hajji Nasi
- Sarkhai Beyglu
- Timur Kandi
