= Palazlar, Araç =

Village in Turkey

Palazlar
- Village
- Location in Turkey
- Coordinates: 41.091°N 33.415°E
- Country: Turkey
- Province: Kastamonu
- District: Araç
- Population (2021): 104
- Time zone: UTC+3 (TRT)

Palazlar is a village in the Araç District of Kastamonu Province in Turkey. Its population is 104 (2021).
