= Aksu, Araç =

Village in Turkey

Aksu
- Village
- Location within Turkey
- Coordinates: 41°17′20″N 33°11′04″E
- Country: Turkey
- Province: Kastamonu
- District: Araç
- Population (2021): 56
- Time zone: UTC+3 (TRT)

Aksu is a village in the Araç District of Kastamonu Province in Turkey. Its population is 56 (2021).

The village is 69 km from the Kastamonu city center and 24 km from Araç district center.
