= Köklüdere, Araç =

Village in Turkey

Köklüdere
- Village
- Location in Turkey
- Coordinates: 40°59′59″N 33°21′28″E
- Country: Turkey
- Province: Kastamonu
- District: Araç
- Population (2021): 131
- Time zone: UTC+3 (TRT)

Köklüdere is a village in the Araç District of Kastamonu Province in Turkey. Its population is 131 (2021).
