= Muratlı, Araç =

Village in Turkey

Muratlı
- Village
- Location in Turkey
- Coordinates: 41°03′12″N 33°26′54″E
- Country: Turkey
- Province: Kastamonu
- District: Araç
- Population (2021): 50
- Time zone: UTC+3 (TRT)

Muratlı is a village in the Araç District of Kastamonu Province in Turkey. Its population is 50 (2021).
