= İhsanlı, Araç =

Village in Turkey

İhsanlı
- Village
- Location in Turkey
- Coordinates: 41°14′31″N 32°59′29″E
- Country: Turkey
- Province: Kastamonu
- District: Araç
- Population (2021): 70
- Time zone: UTC+3 (TRT)

İhsanlı is a village in the Araç District of Kastamonu Province in Turkey. Its population is 70 (2021).
