= Eskiiğdir, Araç =

Village in Turkey

Eskiiğdir
- Village
- Location in Turkey
- Coordinates: 41°12′17″N 33°02′21″E
- Country: Turkey
- Province: Kastamonu
- District: Araç
- Population (2021): 66
- Time zone: UTC+3 (TRT)

Eskiiğdir is a village in the Araç District of Kastamonu Province in Turkey. Its population is 66 (2021).
