= Serdar, Araç =

Village in Turkey

Serdar
- Village
- Location within Turkey
- Coordinates: 41.304°N 33.496°E
- Country: Turkey
- Province: Kastamonu
- District: Araç
- Population (2021): 157
- Time zone: UTC+3 (TRT)

Serdar is a village in the Araç District of Kastamonu Province in Turkey. In 2021, its population was 157.
