= Buğdam, Araç =

Village in Turkey

Buğdam
- Village
- Location in Turkey
- Coordinates: 41°15′02″N 33°24′46″E
- Country: Turkey
- Province: Kastamonu
- District: Araç
- Population (2021): 78
- Time zone: UTC+3 (TRT)

Buğdam is a village in the Araç District of Kastamonu Province in Turkey. Its population is 78 (2021).
