= Avlacık, Araç =

Village in Turkey

Avlacık
- Village
- Location in Turkey
- Coordinates: 41°21′08″N 33°17′19″E
- Country: Turkey
- Province: Kastamonu
- District: Araç
- Population (2021): 92
- Time zone: UTC+3 (TRT)

Avlacık is a village in the Araç District of Kastamonu Province in Turkey. Its population is 92 (2021).
