= Oycalı, Araç =

Village in Turkey

Oycalı
- Village
- Location in Turkey
- Coordinates: 41°15′44″N 33°02′36″E
- Country: Turkey
- Province: Kastamonu
- District: Araç
- Population (2021): 155
- Time zone: UTC+3 (TRT)

Oycalı is a village in the Araç District of Kastamonu Province in Turkey. Its population is 155 (2021).
