= Araç District =

District of Kastamonu Province, Turkey

- District
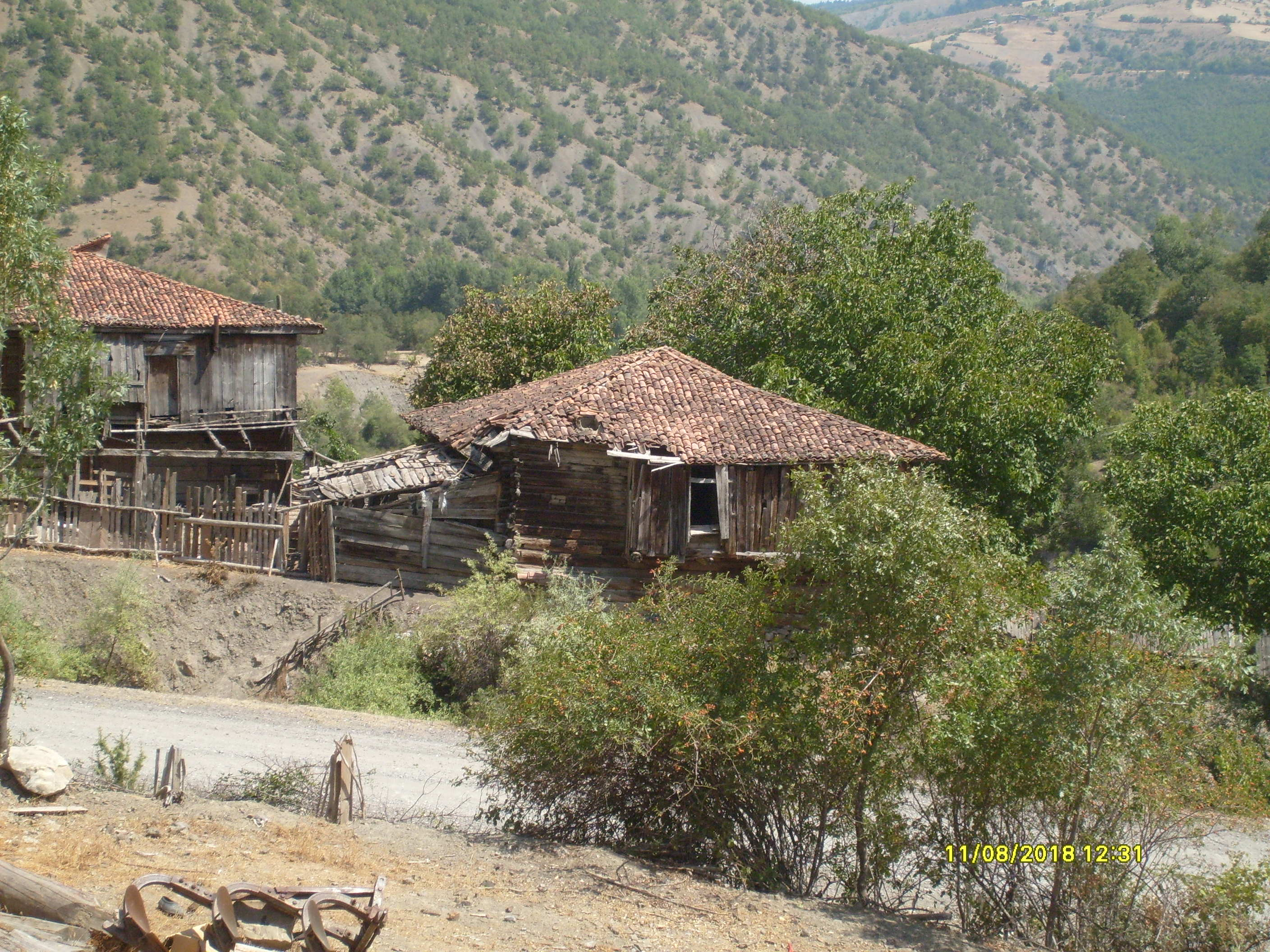
- Sarıhacı village in Araç District

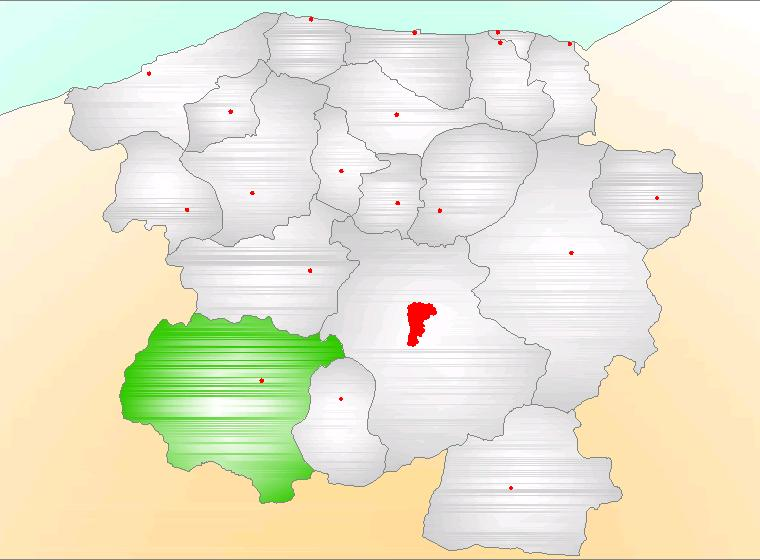
- Map showing Araç District (green) in Kastamonu Province

- Location within Turkey
- Coordinates: 41°15′N 33°20′E
- Country: Turkey
- Province: Kastamonu
- Seat: Araç

Government
  - Kaymakam: Emin Cevat Tutar
- Area: 1,446 km^{2} (558 sq mi)
- Population (2021): 17,920
  - Density: 12.39/km^{2} (32.10/sq mi)
- Time zone: UTC+3 (TRT)
- Website: www.arac.gov.tr

Araç District is a district of the Kastamonu Province of Turkey. Its seat is the town of Araç. Its area is 1,446 km^{2}, and its population is 17,920 (2021).

== Composition ==
There is one municipality in Araç District:

- Araç

There are 119 villages in Araç District:

- Ahatlar
- Akgeçit
- Akıncılar
- Aksu
- Aktaş
- Alakaya
- Alınören
- Aşağıçobanözü
- Aşağıılıpınar
- Aşağıikizören
- Aşağıoba
- Aşağıyazı
- Avlacık
- Avlağıçayırı
- Bahçecik
- Balçıkhisar
- Başköy
- Bektüre
- Belen
- Belkavak
- Buğdam
- Çalköy
- Çamaltı
- Çavuşköy
- Çaykaşı
- Celepler
- Çerçiler
- Cevizlik
- Çubukludere
- Çukurpelit
- Damla
- Değirmençay
- Dereçatı
- Deretepe
- Doğanca
- Doğanpınar
- Doruk
- Ekinözü
- Erekli
- Eskiiğdir
- Fındıklı
- Gemi
- Gergen
- Gökçeçat
- Gökçesu
- Gölcük
- Gülükler
- Güzelce
- Güzlük
- Haliloba
- Hanözü
- Hatipköy
- Huruçören
- İğdir
- İğdirkışla
- İhsanlı
- Karaçalar
- Karacık
- Karakaya
- Karcılar
- Kavacık
- Kavak
- Kayabaşı
- Kayaboğazı
- Kayaören
- Kemerler
- Kirazlı
- Kışlaköy
- Kıyan
- Kıyıdibi
- Kızılören
- Kızılsaray
- Köklüdere
- Köklüyurt
- Köseköy
- Kovanlı
- Muratlı
- Müslimler
- Okçular
- Okluk
- Ömersin
- Oycalı
- Özbel
- Palazlar
- Pelitören
- Pınarören
- Recepbey
- Saltuklu
- Samatlar
- Sarıhacı
- Sarpun
- Şehrimanlar
- Şenyurt
- Serdar
- Sıragömü
- Şiringüney
- Sofçular
- Sümenler
- Susuz
- Taşpınar
- Tatlıca
- Tavşanlı
- Tellikoz
- Terke
- Tokatlı
- Toygaören
- Tuzaklı
- Üçpınar
- Uğruköy
- Ulucak
- Yenice
- Yeşilova
- Yukarıçobanözü
- Yukarıgüney
- Yukarıılıpınar
- Yukarıikizören
- Yukarıoba
- Yukarıyazı
- Yurttepe
