= Aslan Duz =

City in Ardabil province, Iran

Aslan Duz اصلاندوز
- City
- Location within Iran Location within Caucasus Mountains
- Coordinates: 39°26′34″N 47°24′28″E
- Country: Iran
- Province: Ardabil
- County: Aslan Duz
- District: Central

Population (2016)
  - Total: 6,348
- Time zone: UTC+3:30 (IRST)

Aslan Duz (Persian: اصلاندوز) (Note: Also romanized as Aşlān Dūz and Aslandooz; also known as Aslāndūz Tepe) is a city in the Central District of Aslan Duz County, Ardabil province, Iran, serving as capital of both the county and the district. It was the administrative center for Aslan Duz Rural District (Note: Renamed Aslan Duz-e Gharbi Rural District) until its capital was transferred to the village of Gedaylu. The Battle of Aslanduz was fought nearby in 1812.

== Demographics ==
=== Population ===
At the time of the 2006 National Census, the city's population was 3,910 in 862 households, when it was capital of the former Aslan Duz District of Parsabad County. The following census in 2011 counted 4,557 people in 1,172 households. The 2016 census measured the population of the city as 6,348 people in 1,760 households.

In 2019, the district was separated from the county in the establishment of Aslan Duz County, and Aslan Duz was transferred to the new Central District as the county's capital.
