= Kayabaşı, Araç =

Village in Turkey

Kayabaşı
- Village
- Location in Turkey
- Coordinates: 41°14′42″N 33°01′35″E
- Country: Turkey
- Province: Kastamonu
- District: Araç
- Population (2021): 76
- Time zone: UTC+3 (TRT)

Kayabaşı is a village in the Araç District of Kastamonu Province in Turkey. Its population is 76 (2021).
