= Maqsudlu, Azerbaijan =

Maqsudlu
- Location within Azerbaijan Location within Karabakh Economic Region
- Coordinates: 40°05′13″N 46°54′53″E
- Country: Azerbaijan
- Rayon: Agdam
- Time zone: UTC+4 (AZT)
  - Summer (DST): UTC+5 (AZT)

Maqsudlu (also, Makhsudlu and Maksudlu) is a village in the Agdam Rayon of Azerbaijan.
