= Gemi, Araç =

Village in Turkey

Gemi
- Village
- Location in Turkey
- Coordinates: 41°16′34″N 33°21′59″E
- Country: Turkey
- Province: Kastamonu
- District: Araç
- Population (2021): 64
- Time zone: UTC+3 (TRT)

Gemi is a village in the Araç District of Kastamonu Province in Turkey. Its population is 64 (2021).
