= Gujarat Environment Management Institute =

The Gujarat Environment Management Institute (GEMI) is an Autonomous Institute under the Forests and Environment Department of Government of Gujarat. Established in 1999 and based in Gandhinagar, GEMI has been involved in the overall conservation, protection and management of environment and has taken up various studies and research projects.
