= Kışlaköy, Araç =

Village in Turkey

Kışlaköy
- Village
- Location in Turkey
- Coordinates: 41.062°N 33.384°E
- Country: Turkey
- Province: Kastamonu
- District: Araç
- Population (2021): 106
- Time zone: UTC+3 (TRT)

Kışlaköy is a village in the Araç District of Kastamonu Province in Turkey. Its population is 106 (2021).
