= Nur Mohammad Kandi =

Nur Mohammad Kandi نورمحمدكندي
- Village
- Location within Iran
- Coordinates: 36°15′49″N 47°40′14″E
- Country: Iran
- Province: Kurdistan
- County: Bijar
- Bakhsh: Korani
- Rural District: Korani

Population (2006)
  - Total: 167
- Time zone: UTC+3:30 (IRST)
  - Summer (DST): UTC+4:30 (IRDT)

Nur Mohammad Kandi (Persian: نورمحمدكندي, also Romanized as Nūr Moḩammad Kandī; also known as Nūr Moḩammad) is a village in Korani Rural District, Korani District, Bijar County, Kurdistan Province, Iran. At the 2006 census, its population was 167, in 43 families. The village is populated by Azerbaijanis.
