= Karacık, Araç =

Village in Turkey

Karacık
- Village
- Location in Turkey
- Coordinates: 41°01′14″N 33°20′00″E
- Country: Turkey
- Province: Kastamonu
- District: Araç
- Population (2021): 54
- Time zone: UTC+3 (TRT)

Karacık is a village in the Araç District of Kastamonu Province in Turkey. Its population is 54 (2021).
