= Çamaltı, Araç =

Village in Turkey

Çamaltı
- Village
- Location in Turkey
- Coordinates: 41°10′37″N 33°13′07″E
- Country: Turkey
- Province: Kastamonu
- District: Araç
- Population (2021): 59
- Time zone: UTC+3 (TRT)

Çamaltı is a village in the Araç District of Kastamonu Province in Turkey. Its population is 59 (2021).
