= Doğanca, Araç =

Village in Turkey

Doğanca
- Village
- Location in Turkey
- Coordinates: 41.292°N 33.421°E
- Country: Turkey
- Province: Kastamonu
- District: Araç
- Population (2021): 25
- Time zone: UTC+3 (TRT)

Doğanca is a village in the Araç District of Kastamonu Province in Turkey. Its population is 25 (2021).
