= İğdir, Araç =

Village in Turkey

İğdir
- Village
- Location in Turkey
- Coordinates: 41°13′36″N 33°08′08″E
- Country: Turkey
- Province: Kastamonu
- District: Araç
- Population (2021): 1,404
- Time zone: UTC+3 (TRT)

İğdir is a village in the Araç District of Kastamonu Province in Turkey. Its population is 1,404 (2021).
