= Doğanpınar, Araç =

Village in Turkey

Doğanpınar
- Village
- Location in Turkey
- Coordinates: 41.116°N 33.211°E
- Country: Turkey
- Province: Kastamonu
- District: Araç
- Population (2021): 23
- Time zone: UTC+3 (TRT)

Doğanpınar is a village in the Araç District of Kastamonu Province in Turkey. Its population is 23 (2021).
