= Aslan Duz-e Gharbi Rural District =

Rural district in Ardabil province, Iran

Aslan Duz-e Gharbi Rural District Persian: دهستان اصلاندوز غربی
- Rural District
- Location within Iran
- Coordinates: 39°23′N 47°27′E
- Country: Iran
- Province: Ardabil
- County: Aslan Duz
- District: Central
- Established: 1987
- Capital: Gedaylu

Population (2016)
  - Total: 17,709
- Time zone: UTC+3:30 (IRST)

Aslan Duz-e Gharbi Rural District (Persian: دهستان اصلاندوز غربی) (Note: Formerly Aslan Duz Rural District (دهستان اصلاندوز)) is in the Central District of Aslan Duz County, Ardabil province, Iran. Its capital is the village of Gedaylu. The rural district was previously administered from the city of Aslan Duz.

== Demographics ==
=== Population ===
At the time of the 2006 National Census, the rural district's population (as Aslan Duz Rural District (Note: Renamed Aslan Duz-e Gharbi Rural District) of the former Aslan Duz District in Parsabad County) was 15,324 in 2,807 households. There were 16,116 inhabitants in 3,848 households at the following census of 2011. The 2016 census measured the population of the rural district as 17,709 in 4,713 households. The most populous of its 61 villages was Aq Qabaq-e Sofla, with 978 people, which became the capital of Aslan Duz-e Sharqi Rural District.

In 2019, the district was separated from the county in the establishment of Aslan Duz County. The rural district was transferred to the new Central District and renamed Aslan Duz-e Gharbi Rural District.

=== Other villages in the rural district ===
- Afchi
- Asad Kandi
- Asad Qeshlaqi-ye Do
- Asad Qeshlaqi-ye Yek
- Ayvazlu
- Bagheshlu Kandi
- Buzcheh-ye Olya
- Buzcheh-ye Sofla
- Buzcheh-ye Vosta
- Idir-e Olya
- Idir-e Sofla
- Kachi Qeshlaqi-ye Olya
- Kachi Qeshlaqi-ye Sofla
- Kachi Qeshlaqi-ye Vosta
- Kampab Mantqehi Maghan
- Kurlar
- Maqsudlu-ye Olya
- Maqsudlu-ye Sofla
- Maqsudlu-ye Vosta
- Palanglu
- Qarash Qa Tappehsi-ye Sofla
- Qareh Qabaq-e Olya
- Qeshlaq-e Ahmadi
- Qeshlaq-e Buzcheh-ye Olya
- Qeshlaq-e Buzcheh-ye Sofla-ye Yek
- Qeshlaq-e Gablu
- Qeshlaq-e Gedaylu
- Qeshlaq-e Qaharmanlu
- Qeshlaq-e Seyf Khanlu-ye Do
- Qeshlaq-e Seyf Khanlu-ye Yek
- Seyf Khanlu
- Tarbat Kandi
