= Central District (Aslan Duz County) =

District in Ardabil province, Iran

Central District (Aslan Duz County) Persian: بخش مرکزی شهرستان اصلاندوز
- District
- Location within Iran
- Coordinates: 39°25′N 47°30′E
- Country: Iran
- Province: Ardabil
- County: Aslan Duz
- Established: 2019
- Capital: Aslan Duz
- Time zone: UTC+3:30 (IRST)

The Central District of Aslan Duz County (Persian: بخش مرکزی شهرستان اصلاندوز) is in Ardabil province, Iran. Its capital is the city of Aslan Duz, whose population at the time of the 2016 National Census was 6,348 people in 1,760 households.

== History ==
In 2019, Aslan Duz District was separated from Parsabad County in the establishment of Aslan Duz County, which was divided into two districts of two rural districts each, with Aslan Duz as its capital and only city at the time.

== Demographics ==
=== Administrative divisions ===
Central District (Aslan Duz County)
Administrative Divisions
Aslan Duz-e Gharbi RD (Note: Formerly Aslan Duz Rural District)
Aslan Duz-e Sharqi RD
Aslan Duz (city)
RD = Rural District
