= Aslan Duz County =

County in Ardabil province, Iran

Aslan Duz County Persian: شهرستان اصلاندوز
- County
- Location of Aslan Duz County in Ardabil province (top, pink)

- Location of Ardabil province in Iran
- Coordinates: 39°23′27″N 47°32′28″E
- Country: Iran
- Province: Ardabil
- Established: 2019
- Capital: Aslan Duz
- Districts: Central, Borran

Area
  - Total: 592 km^{2} (229 sq mi)

Population (2016)
  - Total: 6,348
  - Density: 10.7/km^{2} (27.8/sq mi)
- Time zone: UTC+3:30 (IRST)

Aslan Duz County (Persian: شهرستان اصلاندوز) is in Ardabil province, Iran. Its capital is the city of Aslan Duz, whose population at the time of the 2016 National Census was 6,348 people in 1,760 households.

== History ==
In 2019, Aslan Duz District was separated from Parsabad County in the establishment of Aslan Duz County, which was divided into two districts of two rural districts each, with Aslan Duz as its capital and only city at the time. The village of Borran-e Olya was converted to a city in 2023.

== Demographics ==
=== Administrative divisions ===
Aslan Duz County's administrative structure is shown in the following table.

Aslan Duz County
Administrative Divisions
Central District
Aslan Duz-e Gharbi RD (Note: Formerly Aslan Duz Rural District)
Aslan Duz-e Sharqi RD
Aslan Duz (city)
Borran District
Borran RD
Qeshlaq-e Gharbi RD
Borran-e Olya (city) (Note: Became a city after the 2016 census)
RD = Rural District
