= Aslan Duz District =

Former district in Ardabil province, Iran

Aslan Duz District Persian: بخش اصلاندوز
- Former District
- Location within Iran
- Coordinates: 39°23′N 47°32′E
- Country: Iran
- Province: Ardabil
- County: Parsabad
- Established: 1991
- Capital: Aslan Duz

Population (2016)
  - Total: 32,506
- Time zone: UTC+3:30 (IRST)

Aslan Duz District (Persian: بخش اصلاندوز) is a former administrative division of Parsabad County, Ardabil province, Iran. Its capital was the city of Aslan Duz.

== History ==
In 2019, the district was separated from the county in the establishment of Aslan Duz County.

== Demographics ==
=== Population ===
At the time of the 2006 National Census, the district's population was 27,418 in 5,220 households. The following census in 2011 counted 27,583 people in 6,663 households. The 2016 census measured the population of the district as 32,506 inhabitants living in 8,898 households.

=== Administrative divisions ===
Aslan Duz District Population
Administrative Divisions	2006	2011	2016
Aslan Duz RD (Note: Renamed Aslan Duz-e Gharbi Rural District)	15,324	16,116	17,709
Qeshlaq-e Gharbi RD	8,184	6,910	8,449
Aslan Duz (city)	3,910	4,557	6,348
Total	27,418	27,583	32,506
RD = Rural District
