= Aminabad =

Aminabad (Persian: امین‌آباد) may refer to:

== Bangladesh ==
- Aminabad Union, a union council in Bhola Island

== India ==
- Aminabad, Lucknow, a market in Lucknow, India

== Iran ==
=== Alborz Province ===
- Aminabad, Alborz, a village in Savojbolagh County

=== Ardabil Province ===
- Aminabad, Ardabil, a village in Nir County

=== East Azerbaijan Province ===
- Aminabad, Bostanabad, a village in Bostanabad County
- Aminabad, Tekmeh Dash, a village in Bostanabad County
- Aminabad, Charuymaq, a village in Charuymaq County

=== Fars Province ===
- Aminabad, Fars, a village in Firuzabad County

=== Gilan Province ===
- Aminabad, Rasht, a village in Rasht County
- Aminabad, Rudbar, a village in Rudbar County

=== Golestan Province ===
- Aminabad, Golestan, a village in Aqqala County

=== Hamadan Province ===
- Aminabad, Chaharduli, a village in Asadabad County
- Aminabad, Darbandrud, a village in Asadabad County
- Aminabad, Famenin, a village in Famenin County
- Aminabad, Nahavand, a village in Nahavand County

=== Isfahan Province ===
- Aminabad, Mahmudabad, a village in Isfahan County
- Aminabad, Qahab-e Jonubi, a village in Isfahan County
- Aminabad, Shahreza, a village in Shahreza County

=== Kerman Province ===
- Aminabad, Anar, a village in Anar County
- Aminabad, Rudbar-e Jonubi, a village in Rudbar-e Jonubi County

=== Kermanshah Province ===
- Aminabad, Kermanshah, a village in Sahneh County

=== Khuzestan Province ===
- Aminabad, Khuzestan, a village in Behbahan County

=== Kurdistan Province ===
- Aminabad, Bijar, a village in Bijar County
- Aminabad, Divandarreh, a village in Divandarreh County
- Aminabad, Qorveh, a village in Qorveh County
- Aminabad, Serishabad, a village in Qorveh County

=== Markazi Province ===
- Aminabad, Markazi, a village in Khomeyn County

=== Mazandaran Province ===
- Aminabad, Babol, a village in Babol County
- Aminabad, Tonekabon, a village in Tonekabon County

=== North Khorasan Province ===
- Aminabad, Esfarayen, a village in Esfarayen County
- Aminabad, Maneh and Samalqan, a village in Maneh and Samalqan County

=== Qazvin Province ===
- Aminabad, Buin Zahra, a village in Qazvin Province, Iran
- Aminabad, Qazvin, a village in Qazvin Province, Iran
- Aminabad-e Now, a village in Qazvin Province, Iran
- Aminabad, alternate name of Qeshlaq-e Aminabad, a village in Qazvin Province, Iran
- Aminabad, alternate name of Suliqan, a village in Qazvin Province, Iran

=== Razavi Khorasan Province ===
- Aminabad, Firuzeh, a village in Firuzeh County
- Aminabad, Mashhad, a village in Mashhad County
- Aminabad, Rashtkhvar, a village in Rashtkhvar County
- Aminabad, Jangal, a village in Rashtkhvar County

=== Semnan Province ===
- Aminabad, Semnan, a village in Shahrud County

=== South Khorasan Province ===
- Aminabad, Khusf, a village in Khusf County
- Aminabad, Neh, a village in Nehbandan County

=== Tehran Province ===
- Aminabad, Firuzkuh, a village in Firuzkuh County
- Aminabad, Malard, a village in Malard County
- Aminabad, Shemiranat, a village in Shemiranat County
- Aminabad, Qarchak, a village in Qarchak County

=== West Azerbaijan Province ===
- Aminabad, Mahabad, a village in Mahabad County
- Aminabad, Piranshahr, a village in Piranshahr County
- Aminabad, Takab, a village in Takab County

=== Yazd Province ===
- Aminabad, Yazd, a village in Meybod County

=== Zanjan Province ===
- Aminabad, Mahneshan, a village in Mahneshan County
- Aminabad, Zanjan, a village in Zanjan County

== Pakistan ==
- Aminabad, Gujranwala, a town in Gujranwala District, Punjab, Pakistan
- Aminabad, Sindh, a town in Hyderabad District, Sindh, Pakistan
- Aminabad, Liaqatpur, a town in Punjab, Pakistan
