= Qaderabad (disambiguation) =

Qaderabad is a city in and the capital of Mashhad Morghab District, in Khorrambid County, Fars Province, Iran.

Qaderabad or Qadrabad (Persian: قادراباد), also rendered as Ghader Abad may also refer to:

== Bangladesh ==
- Qadirabad Cantonment, Natore
  - Qadirabad Cantonment Public School

== Iran ==
=== Fars Province ===
- Qaderabad, Fasa, Fars Province

=== Hamadan Province ===
- Qaderabad, Asadabad, a village in Asadabad County
- Qaderabad, Kabudarahang, a village in Kabudarahang County

=== Isfahan Province ===
- Qaderabad, Khur and Biabanak, a village in Khur and Biabanak County

=== Kerman Province ===
- Qaderabad, Anbarabad, a village in Anbarabad County
- Qaderabad, Arzuiyeh, a village in Arzuiyeh County
- Qaderabad, Negin Kavir, a village in Fahraj County
- Qaderabad, Narmashir, a village in Narmashir County
- Qaderabad, Rudbar-e Jonubi, a village in Rudbar-e Jonubi County

=== Kurdistan Province ===
- Qaderabad, Marivan, a village in Marivan County
- Qaderabad, Saqqez, a village in Saqqez County

=== Lorestan Province ===
- Qaderabad, Lorestan, a village in Selseleh County

=== Markazi Province ===
- Qaderabad, Markazi, a village in Ashtian County

=== Razavi Khorasan Province ===
- Qaderabad, Mashhad, a village in Mashhad County
- Qaderabad, Rashtkhvar, a village in Rashtkhvar County
- Qaderabad, Taybad, a village inTaybad County
- Qaderabad, Torbat-e Jam, a village in Torbat-e Jam County

=== Semnan Province ===
- Qaderabad, Damghan, a village in Damghan County
- Qaderabad, Sorkheh, a village in Sorkheh County

=== Sistan and Baluchestan Province ===
- Qaderabad, Hirmand, a village in Hirmand County
- Qaderabad, Iranshahr, a village in Iranshahr County
- Qaderabad, Damen, a village in Iranshahr County
- Qaderabad, Irandegan, a village in Khash County
- Qaderabad, Mirjaveh, a village in Mirjaveh County

=== South Khorasan Province ===
- Qadrabad, South Khorasan, a village in Tabas County

=== West Azerbaijan Province ===
- Qaderabad, Akhtachi, a village in Bukan County
- Qaderabad, Il Teymur, a village in Bukan County

== Pakistan ==
=== Punjab Province ===
- Qadirabad, a city in Punjab, Pakistan

== See also ==
- Qadirabad, Iran (disambiguation)
