= Siah Kamar =

Siah Kamar or Siyah Kamar (Persian: سياه كمر) may refer to various places in Iran:

== East Azerbaijan province ==
- Siah Kamar, East Azerbaijan

== Hamadan province ==
- Siah Kamar, Asadabad

== Kermanshah province ==
- Siah Kamar, Kermanshah
- Siah Kamar-e Olya, Kermanshah County
- Siah Kamar-e Olya Maruf, Kermanshah County
- Siah Kamar-e Sofla, Kermanshah County
