= Najafabad, Asadabad =

Village in Hamadan province, Iran

Najafabad Persian: نجف اباد
- Village
- Location within Iran
- Coordinates: 34°39′09″N 47°58′28″E
- Country: Iran
- Province: Hamadan
- County: Asadabad
- District: Pirsalman
- Rural District: Pirsalman

Population (2016)
  - Total: 80
- Time zone: UTC+3:30 (IRST)

Najafabad (Persian: نجف اباد) (Note: Also romanized as Najafābād; also known as Qalā Cheqā, Qal‘eh Chakeh, Qal‘eh Chankeh, and Qal‘eh-ye Chakeh) is a village in Pirsalman Rural District of Pirsalman District in Asadabad County, Hamadan province, Iran.

== Demographics ==
=== Population ===
At the time of the 2006 National Census, the village's population was 142 in 29 households, when it was in Jolgeh Rural District of the Central District. The following census in 2011 counted 134 people in 31 households, by which time the village had been separated from the district in the formation of Pirsalman District. Najafabad was transferred to Pirsalman Rural District in the same district. The 2016 census measured the population of the village as 80 people in 22 households.
