= Nosratabad-e Laklak =

Village in Hamadan province, Iran

Nosratabad-e Laklak Persian: نصرت اباد لك لك
- Village
- Location within Iran
- Coordinates: 34°39′53″N 47°57′46″E
- Country: Iran
- Province: Hamadan
- County: Asadabad
- District: Pirsalman
- Rural District: Pirsalman

Population (2016)
  - Total: 287
- Time zone: UTC+3:30 (IRST)

Nosratabad-e Laklak (Persian: نصرت اباد لك لك) (Note: Also romanized as Noşratābād-e Laklak; also known as Noşratābād) is a village in Pirsalman Rural District of Pirsalman District in Asadabad County, Hamadan province, Iran.

== Demographics ==
=== Population ===
At the time of the 2006 National Census, the village's population was 372 in 82 households, when it was in Jolgeh Rural District of the Central District. The following census in 2011 counted 357 people in 96 households, by which time the village had been separated from the district in the formation of Pirsalman District. Nosratabad-e Laklak was transferred to Pirsalman Rural District in the same district. The 2016 census measured the population of the village as 287 people in 82 households.
