= Lak Lak, Hamadan =

Village in Hamadan province, Iran

Lak Lak Persian: لک‌لک
- Village
- Location within Iran
- Coordinates: 34°40′04″N 47°56′39″E
- Country: Iran
- Province: Hamadan
- County: Asadabad
- District: Pirsalman
- Rural District: Pirsalman

Population (2016)
  - Total: 868
- Time zone: UTC+3:30 (IRST)

Lak Lak (Persian: لک‌لک) is a village in Pirsalman Rural District of Pirsalman District in Asadabad County, Hamadan province, Iran.

== Demographics ==
=== Population ===
At the time of the 2006 National Census, the village's population was 1,098 in 255 households, when it was in Jolgeh Rural District of the Central District. The following census in 2011 counted 1,084 people in 301 households, by which time the village had been separated from the district in the formation of Pirsalman District. Lak Lak was transferred to Pirsalman Rural District in the same district. The 2016 census measured the population of the village as 868 people in 273 households, the most populous in its rural district.
