= Qasemabad-e Laklak =

Village in Hamadan province, Iran

Qasemabad-e Laklak Persian: قاسم ابادلك لك
- Village
- Location within Iran
- Coordinates: 34°40′31″N 47°58′20″E
- Country: Iran
- Province: Hamadan
- County: Asadabad
- District: Pirsalman
- Rural District: Pirsalman

Population (2016)
  - Total: 755
- Time zone: UTC+3:30 (IRST)

Qasemabad-e Laklak (Persian: قاسم ابادلك لك) (Note: Also romanized as Qāsemābād-e Laklak; also known as Qāsemābād) is a village in Pirsalman Rural District of Pirsalman District in Asadabad County, Hamadan province, Iran.

== Demographics ==
=== Population ===
At the time of the 2006 National Census, the village's population was 701 in 175 households, when it was in Jolgeh Rural District of the Central District. The following census in 2011 counted 738 people in 205 households, by which time the village had been separated from the district in the formation of Pirsalman District. Qasemabad-e Laklak was transferred to Pirsalman Rural District in the same district. The 2016 census measured the population of the village as 755 people in 238 households.
