= Ganjeh, Hamadan =

Village in Hamadan province, Iran

Ganjeh Persian: گنجه
- Village
- Location within Iran
- Coordinates: 34°44′22″N 47°57′19″E
- Country: Iran
- Province: Hamadan
- County: Asadabad
- District: Pirsalman
- Rural District: Pirsalman

Population (2016)
  - Total: 128
- Time zone: UTC+3:30 (IRST)

Ganjeh (Persian: گنجه) is a village in Pirsalman Rural District of Pirsalman District in Asadabad County, Hamadan province, Iran.

== Demographics ==
=== Population ===
At the time of the 2006 National Census, the village's population was 169 in 44 households, when it was in Darbandrud Rural District of the Central District. The following census in 2011 counted 153 people in 40 households, by which time the village had been separated from the district in the formation of Pirsalman District. Ganjeh was transferred to Pirsalman Rural District in the same district. The 2016 census measured the population of the village as 128 people in 47 households.
