= Deh Sefid, Hamadan =

Village in Hamadan province, Iran

Deh Sefid Persian: ده‌سفید
- Village
- Location within Iran
- Coordinates: 34°51′56″N 47°53′06″E
- Country: Iran
- Province: Hamadan
- County: Asadabad
- District: Pirsalman
- Rural District: Kolyai

Population (2016)
  - Total: 207
- Time zone: UTC+3:30 (IRST)

Deh Sefid (Persian: ده‌سفید) (Note: Also romanized as Deh Safīd, Deh Sefīd, and Deh-e Sefid; also known as Deh Cheri and Deh Chirl) is a village in Kolyai Rural District of Pirsalman District in Asadabad County, Hamadan province, Iran.

== Demographics ==
=== Population ===
At the time of the 2006 National Census, the village's population was 265 in 67 households, when it was in the Central District. The following census in 2011 counted 239 people in 65 households, by which time the rural district had been separated from the district in the formation of Pirsalman District. The 2016 census measured the population of the village as 207 people in 66 households.
