= Chahar Cheshmeh, Hamadan =

Village in Hamadan province, Iran

Chahar Cheshmeh Persian: چهارچشمه
- Village
- Location within Iran
- Coordinates: 34°47′15″N 47°50′58″E
- Country: Iran
- Province: Hamadan
- County: Asadabad
- District: Pirsalman
- Rural District: Kolyai

Population (2016)
  - Total: 58
- Time zone: UTC+3:30 (IRST)

Chahar Cheshmeh (Persian: چهارچشمه) (Note: Also romanized as Chahār Cheshmeh; formerly known as Cheshmeh-ye Shahqoli (چشمه شاهقلي), also romanized as Cheshmeh-ye Shāhqolī) is a village in Kolyai Rural District of Pirsalman District in Asadabad County, Hamadan province, Iran.

== Demographics ==
=== Population ===
At the time of the 2006 National Census, the village's population was 144 in 30 households, when it was in the Central District. The following census in 2011 counted 80 people in 22 households, by which time the rural district had been separated from the district in the formation of Pirsalman District. The 2016 census measured the population of the village as 58 people in 17 households.
