= Meyvaleh =

Village in Hamadan province, Iran

Meyvaleh Persian: ميوله
- Village
- Location within Iran
- Coordinates: 34°49′52″N 47°51′18″E
- Country: Iran
- Province: Hamadan
- County: Asadabad
- District: Pirsalman
- Rural District: Kolyai

Population (2016)
  - Total: 407
- Time zone: UTC+3:30 (IRST)

Meyvaleh (Persian: ميوله) (Note: Also romanized as Meywaleh and Mīūleh; also known as Mayvaleh) is a village in Kolyai Rural District of Pirsalman District in Asadabad County, Hamadan province, Iran.

== Demographics ==
=== Population ===
At the time of the 2006 National Census, the village's population was 506 in 117 households, when it was in the Central District. The following census in 2011 counted 403 people in 117 households, by which time the rural district had been separated from the district in the formation of Pirsalman District. The 2016 census measured the population of the village as 407 people in 135 households.
