= Qadirabad, Iran (disambiguation) =

Qadirabad (Persian: قديراباد) in Iran, may refer to:

- Qadirabad, Fars
- Qadirabad, Iran, in Razavi Khorasan Province
- Qadirabad, Asadabad, Hamadan Province
- Qadirabad, Kabudarahang, Hamadan Province

== See also ==
- Qaderabad (disambiguation)
