= Rostamabad, Hamadan =

Village in Hamadan province, Iran

Rostamabad Persian: رستم اباد
- Village
- Location within Iran
- Coordinates: 34°48′51″N 47°52′27″E
- Country: Iran
- Province: Hamadan
- County: Asadabad
- District: Pirsalman
- Rural District: Kolyai

Population (2016)
  - Total: 72
- Time zone: UTC+3:30 (IRST)

Rostamabad (Persian: رستم اباد) (Note: Also romanized as Rostamābād) is a village in Kolyai Rural District of Pirsalman District in Asadabad County, Hamadan province, Iran.

== Demographics ==
=== Population ===
At the time of the 2006 National Census, the village's population was 136 in 33 households, when it was in the Central District. The following census in 2011 counted 178 people in 27 households, by which time the rural district had been separated from the district in the formation of Pirsalman District. The 2016 census measured the population of the village as 72 people in 21 households.
