= Gonbaleh, Asadabad =

Village in Hamadan province, Iran

Gonbaleh Persian: گنبله
- Village
- Location within Iran
- Coordinates: 34°36′55″N 47°58′22″E
- Country: Iran
- Province: Hamadan
- County: Asadabad
- District: Pirsalman
- Rural District: Pirsalman

Population (2016)
  - Total: 298
- Time zone: UTC+3:30 (IRST)

Gonbaleh (Persian: گنبله; also known as Gombaleh, Gumāla, and Gūn Baleh) is a village in Pirsalman Rural District of Pirsalman District in Asadabad County, Hamadan province, Iran.

== Demographics ==
=== Population ===
At the time of the 2006 National Census, the village's population was 441 in 109 households, when it was in Jolgeh Rural District of the Central District. The following census in 2011 counted 404 people in 108 households, by which time the village had been separated from the district in the formation of Pirsalman District. Gonbaleh was transferred to Pirsalman Rural District in the same district. The 2016 census measured the population of the village as 298 people in 91 households.
