= Takhtiabad =

Village in Hamadan province, Iran

Takhtiabad Persian: تختي اباد
- Village
- Location within Iran
- Coordinates: 34°48′44″N 47°50′16″E
- Country: Iran
- Province: Hamadan
- County: Asadabad
- District: Pirsalman
- Rural District: Kolyai

Population (2016)
  - Total: 29
- Time zone: UTC+3:30 (IRST)

Takhtiabad (Persian: تختي اباد) (Note: Also romanized as Takhtīābād; formerly known as Takht-e Shah (تخت شاه)) is a village in Kolyai Rural District of Pirsalman District in Asadabad County, Hamadan province, Iran.

== Demographics ==
=== Population ===
At the time of the 2006 National Census, the village's population was 92 in 17 households, when it was in the Central District. The following census in 2011 counted 55 people in 16 households, by which time the rural district had been separated from the district in the formation of Pirsalman District. The 2016 census measured the population of the village as 29 people in eight households.
