= Alanjeh =

Village in Hamadan province, Iran

Alanjeh Persian: النجه
- Village
- Location within Iran
- Coordinates: 34°45′03″N 47°57′35″E
- Country: Iran
- Province: Hamadan
- County: Asadabad
- District: Pirsalman
- Rural District: Pirsalman

Population (2016)
  - Total: 117
- Time zone: UTC+3:30 (IRST)

Alanjeh (Persian: النجه) (Note: Also romanized as Ālanjeh and Alnjh; also known as Aalanjih) is a village in Pirsalman Rural District of Pirsalman District in Asadabad County, Hamadan province, Iran.

== Demographics ==
=== Population ===
At the time of the 2006 National Census, the village's population was 182 in 38 households, when it was in Darbandrud Rural District of the Central District. The following census in 2011 counted 157 people in 43 households, by which time the village had been separated from the district in the formation of Pirsalman District. Alanjeh was transferred to Pirsalman Rural District in the same district. The 2016 census measured the population of the village as 117 people in 41 households.
