= Molla Vali =

Molla Vali (Persian: ملاولي) may refer to:

- Molla Vali-ye Valeh, Afghanistan
- Molla Vali, Hamadan, Iran
- Molla Vali, Khuzestan, Iran
