= Jafarabad, Asadabad =

Village in Hamadan province, Iran

Jafarabad Persian: جعفرآباد
- Village
- Location within Iran
- Coordinates: 34°45′07″N 47°54′46″E
- Country: Iran
- Province: Hamadan
- County: Asadabad
- District: Pirsalman
- Rural District: Pirsalman

Population (2016)
  - Total: 130
- Time zone: UTC+3:30 (IRST)

Jafarabad (Persian: جعفرآباد) (Note: Also romanized as Ja‘farābād) is a village in Pirsalman Rural District of Pirsalman District in Asadabad County, Hamadan province, Iran.

== Demographics ==
=== Population ===
At the time of the 2006 National Census, the village's population was 195 in 43 households, when it was in the Central District. The following census in 2011 counted 153 people in 45 households, by which time the rural district had been separated from the district in the formation of Pirsalman District. The 2016 census measured the population of the village as 130 people in 45 households.
