= Keyni Sayeh =

Village in Hamadan province, Iran

Keyni Sayeh Persian: كيني سايه
- Village
- Location within Iran
- Coordinates: 34°49′33″N 47°53′11″E
- Country: Iran
- Province: Hamadan
- County: Asadabad
- District: Pirsalman
- Rural District: Kolyai

Population (2016)
  - Total: 332
- Time zone: UTC+3:30 (IRST)

Keyni Sayeh (Persian: كيني سايه) (Note: Also romanized as Keynī Sāyeh) is a village in Kolyai Rural District of Pirsalman District in Asadabad County, Hamadan province, Iran.

== Demographics ==
=== Population ===
At the time of the 2006 National Census, the village's population was 413 in 103 households, when it was in the Central District. The following census in 2011 counted 370 people in 96 households, by which time the rural district had been separated from the district in the formation of Pirsalman District. The 2016 census measured the population of the village as 332 people in 103 households.
