= Cheshmeh Ali, Hamadan =

Village in Hamadan province, Iran

Cheshmeh Ali Persian: چشمه علي
- Village
- Location within Iran
- Coordinates: 34°49′51″N 47°55′55″E
- Country: Iran
- Province: Hamadan
- County: Asadabad
- District: Pirsalman
- Rural District: Kolyai

Population (2016)
  - Total: 107
- Time zone: UTC+3:30 (IRST)

Cheshmeh Ali (Persian: چشمه علي) (Note: Also romanized as Cheshmeh 'Alī; formerly known as Cheshmeh Shahqoli (چشمه شاهقلي)) is a village in Kolyai Rural District of Pirsalman District in Asadabad County, Hamadan province, Iran.

== Demographics ==
=== Population ===
At the time of the 2006 National Census, the village's population was 76 in 16 households, when it was in the Central District. The following census in 2011 counted 67 people in 17 households, by which time the rural district had been separated from the district in the formation of Pirsalman District. The 2016 census measured the population of the village as 107 people in 30 households.
