= Habashi, Hamadan =

Village in Hamadan province, Iran

Habashi Persian: حبشي
- Village
- Location within Iran
- Coordinates: 34°44′36″N 47°52′38″E
- Country: Iran
- Province: Hamadan
- County: Asadabad
- District: Pirsalman
- Rural District: Pirsalman

Population (2016)
  - Total: 379
- Time zone: UTC+3:30 (IRST)

Habashi (Persian: حبشي) (Note: Also romanized as Ḩabashī) is a village in Pirsalman Rural District of Pirsalman District in Asadabad County, Hamadan province, Iran.

== Demographics ==
=== Population ===
At the time of the 2006 National Census, the village's population was 649 in 171 households, when it was in the Central District. The following census in 2011 counted 560 people in 165 households, by which time the rural district had been separated from the district in the formation of Pirsalman District. The 2016 census measured the population of the village as 379 people in 148 households.
