= Monavar Tappeh =

Village in Hamadan province, Iran

Monavar Tappeh Persian: منورتپه
- Village
- Location within Iran
- Coordinates: 34°43′13″N 47°54′40″E
- Country: Iran
- Province: Hamadan
- County: Asadabad
- District: Pirsalman
- Rural District: Pirsalman

Population (2016)
  - Total: 260
- Time zone: UTC+3:30 (IRST)

Monavar Tappeh (Persian: منورتپه) (Note: Also romanized as Monavvar Tappeh; also known as Fīrūzābād) is a village in Pirsalman Rural District of Pirsalman District in Asadabad County, Hamadan province, Iran.

== Demographics ==
=== Population ===
At the time of the 2006 National Census, the village's population was 418 in 95 households, when it was in the Central District. The following census in 2011 counted 343 people in 88 households, by which time the rural district had been separated from the district in the formation of Pirsalman District. The 2016 census measured the population of the village as 260 people in 82 households.
