= Kawana =

Ka'swana may refer to:

== People ==
- Kawana (surname)
- kāwana, Māori-language term for the Governor-General of New Zealand

== Places ==
- Kawana, Iran
- Electoral district of Kawana
- Kawana Waters, Queensland
- Kawana, Queensland (Rockhampton)

== See also ==
- Kawana Station (disambiguation)
