= Sadeqabad, Hamadan =

Village in Hamadan province, Iran

Sadeqabad Persian: صادق اباد
- Village
- Location within Iran
- Coordinates: 34°41′30″N 47°55′26″E
- Country: Iran
- Province: Hamadan
- County: Asadabad
- District: Pirsalman
- Rural District: Pirsalman

Population (2016)
  - Total: 218
- Time zone: UTC+3:30 (IRST)

Sadeqabad (Persian: صادق اباد) (Note: Also romanized as Şādeqābād) is a village in Pirsalman Rural District of Pirsalman District in Asadabad County, Hamadan province, Iran.

== Demographics ==
=== Population ===
At the time of the 2006 National Census, the village's population was 255 in 61 households, when it was in the Central District. The following census in 2011 counted 263 people in 63 households, by which time the rural district had been separated from the district in the formation of Pirsalman District. The 2016 census measured the population of the village as 218 people in 59 households.
