= Godar Pahn, Hamadan =

Village in Hamadan province, Iran

Godar Pahn Persian: گدارپهن
- Village
- Location within Iran
- Coordinates: 34°50′52″N 47°48′36″E
- Country: Iran
- Province: Hamadan
- County: Asadabad
- District: Pirsalman
- Rural District: Kolyai

Population (2016)
  - Total: 196
- Time zone: UTC+3:30 (IRST)

Godar Pahn (Persian: گدارپهن) (Note: Also romanized as Godār Pahn; also known as Gaudarpahn and Gudarpahn) is a village in Kolyai Rural District of Pirsalman District in Asadabad County, Hamadan province, Iran.

== Demographics ==
=== Population ===
At the time of the 2006 National Census, the village's population was 317 in 65 households, when it was in the Central District. The following census in 2011 counted 229 people in 65 households, by which time the rural district had been separated from the district in the formation of Pirsalman District. The 2016 census measured the population of the village as 196 people in 62 households.
