= Hoseynabad, Asadabad =

Village in Hamadan province, Iran

Hoseynabad Persian: حسين اباد
- Village
- Location within Iran
- Coordinates: 34°49′50″N 47°49′29″E
- Country: Iran
- Province: Hamadan
- County: Asadabad
- District: Pirsalman
- Rural District: Kolyai

Population (2016)
  - Total: 124
- Time zone: UTC+3:30 (IRST)

Hoseynabad (Persian: حسين اباد) (Note: Also romanized as Ḩoseynābād; also known as Ḩoseynābād-e Kolyā’ī and Husainābād) is a village in Kolyai Rural District of Pirsalman District in Asadabad County, Hamadan province, Iran.

== Demographics ==
=== Population ===
At the time of the 2006 National Census, the village's population was 223 in 46 households, when it was in the Central District. The following census in 2011 counted 162 people in 48 households, by which time the rural district had been separated from the district in the formation of Pirsalman District. The 2016 census measured the population of the village as 124 people in 42 households.
