= Bitervan =

Village in Hamadan province, Iran

Bitervan Persian: بيتروان
- Village
- Location within Iran
- Coordinates: 34°39′16″N 47°54′37″E
- Country: Iran
- Province: Hamadan
- County: Asadabad
- District: Pirsalman
- Rural District: Pirsalman

Population (2016)
  - Total: 326
- Time zone: UTC+3:30 (IRST)

Bitervan (Persian: بيتروان) (Note: Also romanized as Bītervān) is a village in Pirsalman Rural District of Pirsalman District in Asadabad County, Hamadan province, Iran.

== Demographics ==
=== Population ===
At the time of the 2006 National Census, the village's population was 537 in 130 households, when it was in the Central District. The following census in 2011 counted 446 people in 124 households, by which time the rural district had been separated from the district in the formation of Pirsalman District. The 2016 census measured the population of the village as 326 people in 100 households.
