= Heydarabad, Hamadan =

Village in Hamadan province, Iran

Heydarabad Persian: حيدراباد
- Village
- Location within Iran
- Coordinates: 34°49′21″N 47°56′35″E
- Country: Iran
- Province: Hamadan
- County: Asadabad
- District: Pirsalman
- Rural District: Kolyai

Population (2016)
  - Total: 19
- Time zone: UTC+3:30 (IRST)

Heydarabad (Persian: حيدراباد) (Note: Also romanized as Ḩeydarābād) is a village in Kolyai Rural District of Pirsalman District in Asadabad County, Hamadan province, Iran.

== Demographics ==
=== Population ===
At the time of the 2006 National Census, the village's population was 38 in 10 households, when it was in the Central District. The following census in 2011 counted a population below the reporting threshold, by which time the rural district had been separated from the district in the formation of Pirsalman District. The 2016 census measured the population of the village as 19 people in eight households.
