= Sirdarreh =

Village in Hamadan province, Iran

Sirdarreh Persian: سيردره
- Village
- Location within Iran
- Coordinates: 34°41′06″N 47°52′20″E
- Country: Iran
- Province: Hamadan
- County: Asadabad
- District: Pirsalman
- Rural District: Pirsalman

Population (2016)
  - Total: 464
- Time zone: UTC+3:30 (IRST)

Sirdarreh (Persian: سيردره) (Note: Also romanized as Sīrdarreh; formerly known as Gāv Godār (گاوگدار)) is a village in Pirsalman Rural District of Pirsalman District in Asadabad County, Hamadan province, Iran.

== Demographics ==
=== Population ===
At the time of the 2006 National Census, the village's population was 500 in 133 households, when it was in the Central District. The following census in 2011 counted 526 people in 141 households, by which time the rural district had been separated from the district in the formation of Pirsalman District. The 2016 census measured the population of the village as 464 people in 151 households.
