= Pir Yusof =

Village in Hamadan province, Iran

Pir Yusof Persian: پيريوسف
- Village
- Location within Iran
- Coordinates: 34°41′20″N 47°53′33″E
- Country: Iran
- Province: Hamadan
- County: Asadabad
- District: Pirsalman
- Rural District: Pirsalman

Population (2016)
  - Total: 372
- Time zone: UTC+3:30 (IRST)

Pir Yusof (Persian: پيريوسف) (Note: Also romanized as Pīr Yūsof) is a village in Pirsalman Rural District of Pirsalman District in Asadabad County, Hamadan province, Iran.

== Demographics ==
=== Population ===
At the time of the 2006 National Census, the village's population was 441 in 106 households, when it was in the Central District. The following census in 2011 counted 447 people in 116 households, by which time the rural district had been separated from the district in the formation of Pirsalman District. The 2016 census measured the population of the village as 372 people in 115 households.
