= Gavanlu, Asadabad =

Gavanlu گوانلو
- Village
- Location within Iran
- Coordinates: 34°42′41″N 48°08′38″E
- Country: Iran
- Province: Hamadan
- County: Asadabad
- Bakhsh: Central
- Rural District: Seyyed Jamal ol Din

Population (2006)
  - Total: 68
- Time zone: UTC+3:30 (IRST)
  - Summer (DST): UTC+4:30 (IRDT)

Gavanlu (Persian: گوانلو, also Romanized as Gavānlū; also known as Gavānleh, Govāneleh, and Govānleh) is a village in Seyyed Jamal ol Din Rural District, in the Central District of Asadabad County, Hamadan Province, Iran. At the 2006 census, its population was 68, in 15 families.
