= Vandarabad =

Village in Hamadan province, Iran

Vandarabad Persian: وندراباد
- Village
- Location within Iran
- Coordinates: 34°40′09″N 48°04′45″E
- Country: Iran
- Province: Hamadan
- County: Asadabad
- District: Central
- Rural District: Seyyed Jamal ol Din

Population (2016)
  - Total: 1,565
- Time zone: UTC+3:30 (IRST)

Vandarabad (Persian: وندراباد) (Note: Also romanized as Vandarābād, Vendarābād, and Venderābād; also known as Mandirābād) is a village in, and the capital of, Seyyed Jamal ol Din Rural District in the Central District of Asadabad County, Hamadan province, Iran. The previous capital of the rural district was the village of Jannatabad, now the city of Paliz.

== Demographics ==
=== Population ===
At the time of the 2006 National Census, the village's population was 1,960 in 501 households. The following census in 2011 counted 1,842 people in 532 households. The 2016 census measured the population of the village as 1,565 people in 506 households.
