= Qara Kand, Asadabad =

Qara Kand قراكند
- Village
- Location within Iran
- Coordinates: 34°57′08″N 48°06′18″E
- Country: Iran
- Province: Hamadan
- County: Asadabad
- Bakhsh: Central
- Rural District: Chaharduli

Population (2006)
  - Total: 127
- Time zone: UTC+3:30 (IRST)
  - Summer (DST): UTC+4:30 (IRDT)

Qara Kand (Persian: قراكند, also Romanized as Qarā Kand; also known as Qarah Kand) is a village in Chaharduli Rural District, in the Central District of Asadabad County, Hamadan Province, Iran. At the 2006 census, its population was 127, in 28 families.
