= Pir Shams ol Din, Hamadan =

Village in Hamadan province, Iran

Pir Shams ol Din Persian: پيرشمس الدين
- Village
- Location within Iran
- Coordinates: 34°39′32″N 48°00′54″E
- Country: Iran
- Province: Hamadan
- County: Asadabad
- District: Central
- Rural District: Jolgeh

Population (2016)
  - Total: 441
- Time zone: UTC+3:30 (IRST)

Pir Shams ol Din (Persian: پيرشمس الدين) (Note: Also romanized as Pīr Shams ol Dīn; also known as Pīr Shams ed Dīn, Pīr Shams od Dīn, and Pīr Shamsuddīn) is a village in Jolgeh Rural District of the Central District in Asadabad County, Hamadan province, Iran.

== Demographics ==
=== Population ===
At the time of the 2006 National Census, the village's population was 488 in 99 households. The following census in 2011 counted 450 people in 102 households. The 2016 census measured the population of the village as 441 people in 113 households.
