= Aliabad-e Pir Shams ol Din =

Village in Hamadan province, Iran

Aliabad-e Pir Shams ol Din Persian: علي ابادپيرشمس الدين
- Village
- Location within Iran
- Coordinates: 34°40′06″N 48°00′10″E
- Country: Iran
- Province: Hamadan
- County: Asadabad
- District: Central
- Rural District: Jolgeh

Population (2016)
  - Total: 85
- Time zone: UTC+3:30 (IRST)

Aliabad-e Pir Shams ol Din (Persian: علي ابادپيرشمس الدين) (Note: Also romanized as ‘Alīābād-e Pīr Shams ol Dīn; also known as ‘Alīābād and ‘Alīābād-e Pīr Shams od Dīn) is a village in Jolgeh Rural District of the Central District in Asadabad County, Hamadan province, Iran.

== Demographics ==
=== Population ===
At the time of the 2006 National Census, the village's population was 98 in 22 households. The following census in 2011 counted 84 people in 21 households. The 2016 census measured the population of the village as 85 people in 25 households.
