= Kolyai =

Kolyai may refer to:

- Kolyai dialect, see Southern Kurdish
- Kolyai, Kermanshah
- Kolyai District, in Kermanshah Province
- Kolyai Rural District, in Hamadan Province
