= Taviran =

Taviran (Persian: طاويران) may refer to:

- Taviran-e Olya
- Taviran-e Sofla

== See also ==
- Tavilan (disambiguation)
