= Pir Malu =

Village in Hamadan province, Iran

Pir Malu Persian: پيرملو
- Village
- Location within Iran
- Coordinates: 34°54′44″N 48°03′57″E
- Country: Iran
- Province: Hamadan
- County: Asadabad
- District: Central
- Rural District: Chaharduli

Population (2016)
  - Total: 353
- Time zone: UTC+3:30 (IRST)

Pir Malu (Persian: پيرملو) (Note: Also romanized as Pīr Malū) is a village in Chaharduli Rural District of the Central District in Asadabad County, Hamadan province, Iran.

== Demographics ==
=== Population ===
At the time of the 2006 National Census, the village's population was 448 in 94 households. The following census in 2011 counted 409 people in 103 households. The 2016 census measured the population of the village as 353 people in 106 households.
