= Nosratabad-e Behraz =

Village in Hamadan province, Iran

Nosratabad-e Behraz Persian: نصرت ابادبهراز
- Village
- Location within Iran
- Coordinates: 34°41′30″N 48°05′06″E
- Country: Iran
- Province: Hamadan
- County: Asadabad
- District: Central
- Rural District: Seyyed Jamal ol Din

Population (2016)
  - Total: 685
- Time zone: UTC+3:30 (IRST)

Nosratabad-e Behraz (Persian: نصرت ابادبهراز) (Note: Also romanized as Noşratābād Bahraz, Noşratābād-e Behrāz, and Noşratābād-e Bohrāz; also known as Bohrāz and Noşratābād) is a village in Seyyed Jamal ol Din Rural District of the Central District in Asadabad County, Hamadan province, Iran.

== Demographics ==
=== Population ===
At the time of the 2006 National Census, the village's population was 915 in 240 households. The following census in 2011 counted 778 people in 247 households. The 2016 census measured the population of the village as 685 people in 235 households.
