= Siravand =

Village in Hamadan province, Iran

Siravand Persian: گذرگجين
- Village
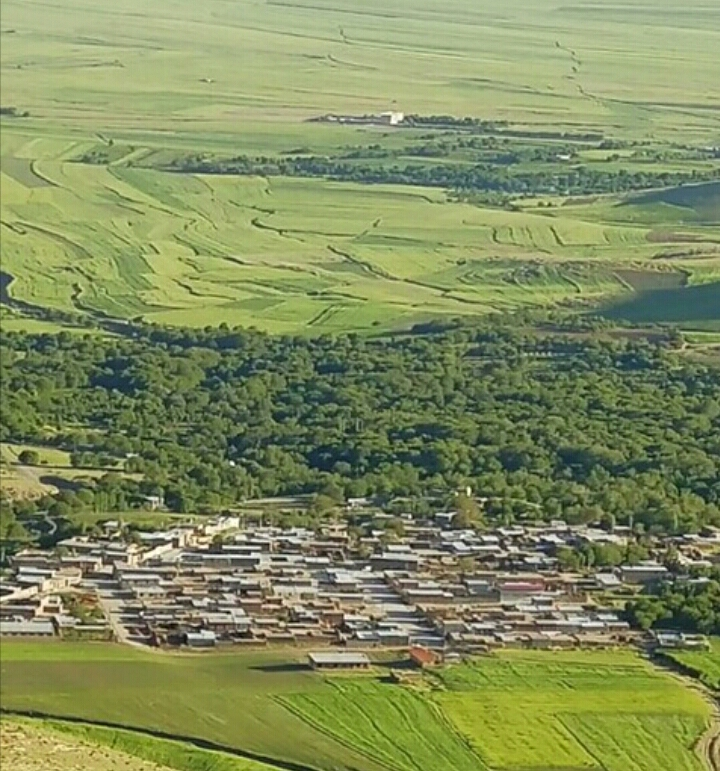
- The village of Siravand

- Location within Iran
- Coordinates: 34°47′43″N 47°59′47″E
- Country: Iran
- Province: Hamadan
- County: Asadabad
- District: Central
- Rural District: Darbandrud

Population (2016)
  - Total: 1,022
- Time zone: UTC+3:30 (IRST)

Siravand (Persian: سيراوند) (Note: Also romanized as Sīrāvand; also known as Sīrāvan and Sirwān) is a village in Darbandrud Rural District of the Central District in Asadabad County, Hamadan province, Iran.

== Demographics ==
=== Population ===
At the time of the 2006 National Census, the village's population was 888 in 211 households. The following census in 2011 counted 750 people in 193 households. The 2016 census measured the population of the village as 531 people in 163 households.
