= Deh Bureh, Asadabad =

Village in Hamadan province, Iran

Deh Bureh Persian: ده بوره
- Village
- Location within Iran
- Coordinates: 34°51′11″N 47°53′13″E
- Country: Iran
- Province: Hamadan
- County: Asadabad
- District: Pirsalman
- Rural District: Kolyai

Population (2016)
  - Total: 102
- Time zone: UTC+3:30 (IRST)

Deh Bureh (Persian: ده بوره) (Note: Also romanized as Deh Būreh; also known as Deh Būr) is a village in Kolyai Rural District of Pirsalman District in Asadabad County, Hamadan province, Iran.

== Demographics ==
=== Population ===
At the time of the 2006 National Census, the village's population was 161 in 40 households, when it was in the Central District. The following census in 2011 counted 144 people in 40 households, by which time the rural district had been separated from the district in the formation of Pirsalman District. The 2016 census measured the population of the village as 102 people in 33 households.
