= Qarah Bolagh, Asadabad =

Village in Hamadan province, Iran

Qarah Bolagh Persian: قره بلاغ
- Village
- Location within Iran
- Coordinates: 34°51′00″N 47°59′21″E
- Country: Iran
- Province: Hamadan
- County: Asadabad
- District: Central
- Rural District: Chaharduli

Population (2016)
  - Total: 474
- Time zone: UTC+3:30 (IRST)

Qarah Bolagh (Persian: قره بلاغ) (Note: Also romanized as Qarah Bolāgh) is a village in Chaharduli Rural District of the Central District in Asadabad County, Hamadan province, Iran.

== Demographics ==
=== Population ===
At the time of the 2006 National Census, the village's population was 592 in 138 households. The following census in 2011 counted 590 people in 153 households. The 2016 census measured the population of the village as 474 people in 133 households.
