= Bad Khvoreh =

Village in Hamadan province, Iran

Bad Khvoreh Persian: بادخوره
- Village
- Location within Iran
- Coordinates: 34°44′35″N 48°04′49″E
- Country: Iran
- Province: Hamadan
- County: Asadabad
- District: Central
- Rural District: Seyyed Jamal ol Din

Population (2016)
  - Total: 1,788
- Time zone: UTC+3:30 (IRST)

Bad Khvoreh (Persian: بادخوره) (Note: Also romanized as Bād Khvoreh and Badkhowreh) is a village in Seyyed Jamal ol Din Rural District of the Central District in Asadabad County, Hamadan province, Iran.

== Demographics ==
=== Population ===
At the time of the 2006 National Census, the village's population was 1,975 in 439 households. The following census in 2011 counted 2,105 people in 534 households. The 2016 census measured the population of the village as 1,788 people in 483 households.
