= Mohammadabad, Asadabad =

Village in Hamadan province, Iran

Mohammadabad Persian: محمداباد
- Village
- Location within Iran
- Coordinates: 34°53′43″N 48°04′32″E
- Country: Iran
- Province: Hamadan
- County: Asadabad
- District: Central
- Rural District: Chaharduli

Population (2016)
  - Total: 430
- Time zone: UTC+3:30 (IRST)

Mohammadabad (Persian: محمداباد) (Note: Also romanized as Moḩammadābād; also known as Khar Ţajar, Kharat Jar (خرط جر), and Khartajal) is a village in Chaharduli Rural District of the Central District in Asadabad County, Hamadan province, Iran.

== Demographics ==
=== Population ===
At the time of the 2006 National Census, the village's population was 398 in 96 households. The following census in 2011 counted 466 people in 109 households. The 2016 census measured the population of the village as 430 people in 138 households.
