= Pol-e Shekasteh, Asadabad =

Village in Hamadan province, Iran

Pol-e Shekasteh Persian: پل شكسته
- Village
- Location within Iran
- Coordinates: 34°37′45″N 48°02′42″E
- Country: Iran
- Province: Hamadan
- County: Asadabad
- District: Central
- Rural District: Jolgeh

Population (2016)
  - Total: 348
- Time zone: UTC+3:30 (IRST)

Pol-e Shekasteh (Persian: پل شكسته) (Note: Formerly known as Khosrowābād (خسروآباد); also known as Khūshrnābād, Khūsrūābād, and Pol Shekast) is a village in Jolgeh Rural District of the Central District in Asadabad County, Hamadan province, Iran.

== Demographics ==
=== Population ===
At the time of the 2006 National Census, the village's population was 397 in 97 households. The following census in 2011 counted 399 people in 118 households. The 2016 census measured the population of the village as 348 people in 110 households.
