= Molla Vali, Hamadan =

Molla Vali ملاولي
- Village
- Location within Iran
- Coordinates: 34°56′52″N 47°56′37″E
- Country: Iran
- Province: Hamadan
- County: Asadabad
- Bakhsh: Central
- Rural District: Chaharduli

Population (2006)
  - Total: 168
- Time zone: UTC+3:30 (IRST)
  - Summer (DST): UTC+4:30 (IRDT)

Molla Vali (Persian: ملاولي, also Romanized as Mollā Valī) is a village in Chaharduli Rural District, in the Central District of Asadabad County, Hamadan Province, Iran. At the 2006 census, its population was 168, in 37 families.
