= Kamak-e Sofla =

Village in Hamadan province, Iran

Kamak-e Sofla Persian: كمك سفلي
- Village
- Location within Iran
- Coordinates: 34°53′15″N 47°58′07″E
- Country: Iran
- Province: Hamadan
- County: Asadabad
- District: Central
- Rural District: Chaharduli

Population (2016)
  - Total: 914
- Time zone: UTC+3:30 (IRST)

Kamak-e Sofla (Persian: كمك سفلي) (Note: Also romanized as Kamak-e Soflá; also known as Kamak and Kamak-e Pā’īn) is a village in Chaharduli Rural District of the Central District in Asadabad County, Hamadan province, Iran.

== Demographics ==
=== Population ===
At the time of the 2006 National Census, the village's population was 898 in 223 households. The following census in 2011 counted 1,047 people in 316 households. The 2016 census measured the population of the village as 914 people in 279 households.
