= Tavilan-e Sofla =

Village in Hamadan province, Iran

Tavilan-e Sofla Persian: طويلان سفلي
- Village
- Location within Iran
- Coordinates: 34°47′58″N 47°52′11″E
- Country: Iran
- Province: Hamadan
- County: Asadabad
- District: Pirsalman
- Rural District: Kolyai

Population (2016)
  - Total: 927
- Time zone: UTC+3:30 (IRST)

Tavilan-e Sofla (Persian: طويلان سفلي) (Note: Also romanized as Ţavīlān-e Soflá; also known as Ţavīlān-e Pā’īn, Toilān, and Tolan Pam) is a village in, and the capital of, Kolyai Rural District in Pirsalman District of Asadabad County, Hamadan province, Iran.

== Demographics ==
=== Population ===
At the time of the 2006 National Census, the village's population was 1,088 in 224 households, when it was in the Central District. The following census in 2011 counted 991 people in 290 households, by which time the rural district had been separated from the district in the formation of Pirsalman District. The 2016 census measured the population of the village as 927 people in 284 households, the most populous in its rural district.
