= Deh Now, Asadabad =

Village in Hamadan province, Iran

Deh Now Persian: ده نو
- Village
- Location within Iran
- Coordinates: 34°45′16″N 48°02′26″E
- Country: Iran
- Province: Hamadan
- County: Asadabad
- District: Central
- Rural District: Darbandrud

Population (2016)
  - Total: 644
- Time zone: UTC+3:30 (IRST)

Deh Now (Persian: ده نو) is a village in Darbandrud Rural District of the Central District in Asadabad County, Hamadan province, Iran.

== Demographics ==
=== Population ===
At the time of the 2006 National Census, the village's population was 710 in 173 households. The following census in 2011 counted 725 people in 200 households. The 2016 census measured the population of the village as 644 people in 183 households.
