= Yusefabad, Hamadan =

Village in Hamadan province, Iran

Yusefabad Persian: يوسف اباد
- Village
- Location within Iran
- Coordinates: 34°45′21″N 48°01′26″E
- Country: Iran
- Province: Hamadan
- County: Asadabad
- District: Central
- Rural District: Darbandrud

Population (2016)
  - Total: 915
- Time zone: UTC+3:30 (IRST)

Yusefabad (Persian: يوسف اباد) (Note: Also romanized as Yūsefābād and Yūsofābād) is a village in, and the capital of, Darbandrud Rural District in the Central District of Asadabad County, Hamadan province, Iran.

== Demographics ==
=== Population ===
At the time of the 2006 National Census, the village's population was 896 in 214 households. The following census in 2011 counted 1,126 people in 255 households. The 2016 census measured the population of the village as 915 people in 243 households.
