= Khakriz, Hamadan =

Village in Hamadan province, Iran

Khakriz Persian: خاكريز
- Village
- Location within Iran
- Coordinates: 34°46′56″N 48°05′02″E
- Country: Iran
- Province: Hamadan
- County: Asadabad
- District: Central
- Rural District: Darbandrud

Population (2016)
  - Total: 1,089
- Time zone: UTC+3:30 (IRST)

Khakriz (Persian: خاكريز) (Note: Also romanized as Khākrīz) is a village in Darbandrud Rural District of the Central District in Asadabad County, Hamadan province, Iran.

== Demographics ==
=== Population ===
At the time of the 2006 National Census, the village's population was 1,253 in 282 households. The following census in 2011 counted 1,117 people in 308 households. The 2016 census measured the population of the village as 1,089 people in 316 households.
