= Chenar-e Olya, Hamadan =

Village in Hamadan province, Iran

Chenar-e Olya Persian: چنار عليا
- Village
- Location within Iran
- Coordinates: 34°52′42″N 48°04′28″E
- Country: Iran
- Province: Hamadan
- County: Asadabad
- District: Central
- Rural District: Chaharduli

Population (2016)
  - Total: 2,020
- Time zone: UTC+3:30 (IRST)

Chenar-e Olya (Persian: چنار عليا) (Note: Also romanized as Chenār-e ‘Olyā; formerly known as Chenār-e ‘Abbās Khān (چنار عباسخان); also known as Chenār) is a village in, and the capital of, Chaharduli Rural District in the Central District of Asadabad County, Hamadan province, Iran.

== Demographics ==
=== Ethnicity ===
The village is populated by Kurds and Turkic peoples.

=== Population ===
At the time of the 2006 National Census, the village's population was 2,183 in 528 households. The following census in 2011 counted 2,415 people in 640 households. The 2016 census measured the population of the village as 2,020 people in 602 households, the most populous in its rural district.
