= Ahu =

Ahu or AHU may refer to:

== Education ==
- AdventHealth University (AHU), a private health sciences university in Orlando, Florida, U.S.
- Anhui University (AHU), a public university in Hefei, Anhui, China

== Polynesian religion ==
- Ahu or a'u – the central stone of a Polynesian marae
- Ahu (Easter Island), stone platforms for moai
- Ahu, altars in heiau (Hawaiian temples)

== Places ==
- Ahu, Ardabil – Village in Ardabil province, Iran
- Ahu, Markazi – Village in Markazi Province, Iran
- Ahu Qaleh – Village in Hir Rural District, Ardabil province, Iran
- Ahu Tappeh – Village in Chaharduli Rural District, Asadabad County, Hamadan Province, Iran
- AHU, IATA code for Cherif Al Idrissi Airport, Al Hoceima, Morocco

== People ==
- Ahu Antmen (born 1971), Turkish professor
- Ahu Tuğba (1955-2024), Turkish actress
- Te Ahu Davis (born 1985), New Zealand cricketer
- Ahu-toru, Tahitian who travelled with du Fresne
- Ahu Türkpençe (born 1977), Turkish actress
- Ahu Yağtu – Turkish actress and model
- Ihaia Te Ahu

== Other uses ==
- Air handler, a common part of HVAC systems
- Ahu River – River in Madhya Pradesh and Rajasthan, India
