= Valiabad, Hamadan =

Village in Hamadan province, Iran

Valiabad Persian: ولي اباد
- Village
- Location within Iran
- Coordinates: 34°38′37″N 48°03′58″E
- Country: Iran
- Province: Hamadan
- County: Asadabad
- District: Central
- Rural District: Jolgeh

Population (2016)
  - Total: 104
- Time zone: UTC+3:30 (IRST)

Valiabad (Persian: ولي اباد) (Note: Also romanized as Valīābād and Walīābād) is a village in Jolgeh Rural District of the Central District in Asadabad County, Hamadan province, Iran.

== Demographics ==
=== Population ===
At the time of the 2006 National Census, the village's population was 152 in 37 households. The following census in 2011 counted 135 people in 35 households. The 2016 census measured the population of the village as 104 people in 30 households.
