= Hudaraj =

Village in Hamadan province, Iran

Hudaraj Persian: هودرج
- Village
- Location within Iran
- Coordinates: 34°44′02″N 48°09′42″E
- Country: Iran
- Province: Hamadan
- County: Asadabad
- District: Central
- Rural District: Seyyed Jamal ol Din

Population (2016)
  - Total: 485
- Time zone: UTC+3:30 (IRST)

Hudaraj (Persian: هودرج) (Note: Also romanized as Hoodaraj and Hūdaraj) is a village in Seyyed Jamal ol Din Rural District of the Central District in Asadabad County, Hamadan province, Iran.

== Demographics ==
=== Population ===
At the time of the 2006 National Census, the village's population was 646 in 144 households. The following census in 2011 counted 664 people in 176 households. The 2016 census measured the population of the village as 485 people in 141 households.
