= Kavanaj =

Village in Hamadan province, Iran

Kavanaj Persian: كوانج
- Village
- Location within Iran
- Coordinates: 34°39′53″N 47°53′48″E
- Country: Iran
- Province: Hamadan
- County: Asadabad
- District: Pirsalman
- Rural District: Pirsalman

Population (2016)
  - Total: 164
- Time zone: UTC+3:30 (IRST)

Kavanaj (Persian: كوانج) (Note: Also romanized as Kavānaj and Kavānej; also known as Govānech, Kavāneh, and Kawāna) is a village in Pirsalman Rural District of Pirsalman District in Asadabad County, Hamadan province, Iran.

== Demographics ==
=== Population ===
At the time of the 2006 National Census, the village's population was 231 in 59 households, when it was in the Central District. The following census in 2011 counted 215 people in 55 households, by which time the rural district had been separated from the district in the formation of Pirsalman District. The 2016 census measured the population of the village as 164 people in 51 households.
