= Seyfabad, Hamadan =

Village in Hamadan province, Iran

Seyfabad Persian: سيف اباد
- Village
- Location within Iran
- Coordinates: 34°42′17″N 48°01′59″E
- Country: Iran
- Province: Hamadan
- County: Asadabad
- District: Central
- Rural District: Jolgeh

Population (2016)
  - Total: 239
- Time zone: UTC+3:30 (IRST)

Seyfabad (Persian: سيف اباد) (Note: Also romanized as Seyfābād; also known as Saifābād) is a village in Jolgeh Rural District of the Central District in Asadabad County, Hamadan province, Iran.

== Demographics ==
=== Population ===
At the time of the 2006 National Census, the village's population was 309 in 74 households. The following census in 2011 counted 285 people in 75 households. The 2016 census measured the population of the village as 239 people in 75 households.
