= Bifanaj =

Village in Hamadan province, Iran

Bifanaj Persian: بيفانج
- Village
- Location within Iran
- Coordinates: 34°36′53″N 48°01′01″E
- Country: Iran
- Province: Hamadan
- County: Asadabad
- District: Central
- Rural District: Jolgeh

Population (2016)
  - Total: 226
- Time zone: UTC+3:30 (IRST)

Bifanaj (Persian: بيفانج) (Note: Also romanized as Bīfānaj; also known as Pī Fīān, Pīfānach, Pīfānaj, and Pifianeh) is a village in Jolgeh Rural District of the Central District in Asadabad County, Hamadan province, Iran.

== Demographics ==
=== Population ===
At the time of the 2006 National Census, the village's population was 234 in 59 households. The following census in 2011 counted 251 people in 70 households. The 2016 census measured the population of the village as 226 people in 69 households.
