= Siah Kamar, Asadabad =

Siah Kamar سياه كمر
- Village
- Location within Iran
- Coordinates: 34°53′13″N 48°01′38″E
- Country: Iran
- Province: Hamadan
- County: Asadabad
- Bakhsh: Central
- Rural District: Chaharduli

Population (2006)
  - Total: 58
- Time zone: UTC+3:30 (IRST)
  - Summer (DST): UTC+4:30 (IRDT)

Siah Kamar (Persian: سياه كمر, also Romanized as Sīāh Kamar and Seyāh Kamar) is a village in Chaharduli Rural District, in the Central District of Asadabad County, Hamadan Province, Iran. At the 2006 census, its population was 58, in 11 families.
