= Musaabad, Asadabad =

Village in Hamadan province, Iran

Musaabad Persian: موسي اباد
- Village
- Location within Iran
- Coordinates: 34°41′34″N 48°00′03″E
- Country: Iran
- Province: Hamadan
- County: Asadabad
- District: Central
- Rural District: Jolgeh

Population (2016)
  - Total: 1,218
- Time zone: UTC+3:30 (IRST)

Musaabad (Persian: موسي اباد) (Note: Also Romanized as Mūsáābād) is a village in, and the capital of, Jolgeh Rural District in the Central District of Asadabad County, Hamadan province, Iran.

== Demographics ==
=== Population ===
At the time of the 2006 National Census, the village's population was 1,716 in 415 households. The following census in 2011 counted 1,637 people in 481 households. The 2016 census measured the population of the village as 1,218 people in 407 households, the most populous in its rural district.
