= Hasanabad-e Emam =

Village in Hamadan province, Iran

Hasanabad-e Emam Persian: حسن ابادامام
- Village
- Location within Iran
- Coordinates: 34°57′02″N 48°03′03″E
- Country: Iran
- Province: Hamadan
- County: Asadabad
- District: Central
- Rural District: Chaharduli

Population (2016)
  - Total: 542
- Time zone: UTC+3:30 (IRST)

Hasanabad-e Emam (Persian: حسن ابادامام) (Note: Also romanized as Ḩasanābād-e Emām; also known as Ḩasanābād and Ḩasanābād-e Afshār) is a village in Chaharduli Rural District of the Central District in Asadabad County, Hamadan province, Iran.

== Demographics ==
=== Population ===
At the time of the 2006 National Census, the village's population was 544 in 120 households. The following census in 2011 counted 640 people in 165 households. The 2016 census measured the population of the village as 542 people in 161 households.
