= Ahmadabad, Asadabad =

Village in Hamadan province, Iran

Ahmadabad Persian: احمداباد
- Village
- Location within Iran
- Coordinates: 34°43′52″N 48°02′11″E
- Country: Iran
- Province: Hamadan
- County: Asadabad
- District: Central
- Rural District: Darbandrud

Population (2016)
  - Total: 625
- Time zone: UTC+3:30 (IRST)

Ahmadabad (Persian: احمداباد) (Note: Also romanized as Aḩmadābād) is a village in Darbandrud Rural District of the Central District in Asadabad County, Hamadan province, Iran.

== Demographics ==
=== Population ===
At the time of the 2006 National Census, the village's population was 599 in 135 households. The following census in 2011 counted 641 people in 170 households. The 2016 census measured the population of the village as 625 people in 172 households.
