= Chenar-e Sofla, Hamadan =

Village in Hamadan province, Iran

Chenar-e Sofla Persian: چنار سفلی
- Village
- Location within Iran
- Coordinates: 34°46′14″N 47°58′35″E
- Country: Iran
- Province: Hamadan
- County: Asadabad
- District: Central
- Rural District: Darbandrud

Population (2016)
  - Total: 3,628
- Time zone: UTC+3:30 (IRST)

Chenar-e Sofla (Persian: چنار سفلی) (Note: Also romanized as Chenār-e Soflá; formerly known as Chahar Sheykh (چهارشيخ); also known as Chenār, Chenār Sheykh, Chenār Sheykh-e Soflá, Chenār-e Sheykh, and Chīnār) is a village in Darbandrud Rural District of the Central District in Asadabad County, Hamadan province, Iran.

== Demographics ==
=== Population ===
At the time of the 2006 National Census, the village's population was 3,890 in 1,002 households. The following census in 2011 counted 4,209 people in 1,192 households. The 2016 census measured the population of the village as 3,628 people in 1,090 households, the most populous in its rural district.
