= Bujin =

Bujin بوجين
- Village
- Location within Iran
- Coordinates: 34°48′26″N 48°03′33″E
- Country: Iran
- Province: Hamadan
- County: Asadabad
- Bakhsh: Central
- Rural District: Darbandrud

Population (2006)
  - Total: 447
- Time zone: UTC+3:30 (IRST)
  - Summer (DST): UTC+4:30 (IRDT)

Bujin (Persian: بوجين, also Romanized as Būjīn) is a village in Darbandrud Rural District, in the Central District of Asadabad County, Hamadan province, Iran. At the 2006 census, its population was 447, in 99 families.
