= Tavilan =

Tavilan (Persian: طويلان) may refer to:

- Tavilan-e Olya
- Tavilan-e Sofla

== See also ==
- Taviran (disambiguation)
