= Cheshmeh Qandab =

Village in Hamadan province, Iran

Cheshmeh Qandab Persian: چشمه قنداب
- Village
- Location within Iran
- Coordinates: 34°37′37″N 48°05′28″E
- Country: Iran
- Province: Hamadan
- County: Asadabad
- District: Central
- Rural District: Jolgeh

Population (2016)
  - Total: 273
- Time zone: UTC+3:30 (IRST)

Cheshmeh Qandab (Persian: چشمه قنداب) (Note: Also romanized as Cheshmeh Qandāb; formerly known as Chashmeh Gandāb (چشمه گنداب), also romanized as Cheshmeh Gandāb) is a village in Jolgeh Rural District of the Central District in Asadabad County, Hamadan province, Iran.

== Demographics ==
=== Population ===
At the time of the 2006 National Census, the village's population was 305 in 69 households. The following census in 2011 counted 267 people in 75 households. The 2016 census measured the population of the village as 273 people in 77 households.
