= Hesamabad, Asadabad =

Village in Hamadan province, Iran

Hesamabad Persian: حسام اباد
- Village
- Location within Iran
- Coordinates: 34°44′18″N 48°00′26″E
- Country: Iran
- Province: Hamadan
- County: Asadabad
- District: Central
- Rural District: Darbandrud

Population (2016)
  - Total: 2,023
- Time zone: UTC+3:30 (IRST)

Hesamabad (Persian: حسام اباد) (Note: Also romanized as Ḩesāmābād; also known as Hīsāmābād and Kolūn Tappeh) is a village in Darbandrud Rural District of the Central District in Asadabad County, Hamadan province, Iran.

== Demographics ==
=== Population ===
At the time of the 2006 National Census, the village's population was 2,045 in 434 households. The following census in 2011 counted 2,134 people in 546 households. The 2016 census measured the population of the village as 2,023 people in 557 households.
