= Khondab, Hamadan =

Khondab خنداب
- Village
- Location within Iran
- Coordinates: 34°45′47″N 48°12′19″E
- Country: Iran
- Province: Hamadan
- County: Asadabad
- Bakhsh: Central
- Rural District: Seyyed Jamal ol Din

Population (2006)
  - Total: 111
- Time zone: UTC+3:30 (IRST)
  - Summer (DST): UTC+4:30 (IRDT)

Khondab (Persian: خنداب, also Romanized as Khondāb; also known as Khūnāb, Qandāq, and Qondāq) is a village in Seyyed Jamal ol Din Rural District, in the Central District of Asadabad County, Hamadan Province, Iran. At the 2006 census, its population was 111, in 25 families.
