= Quch Tappeh =

Village in Hamadan province, Iran

Quch Tappeh Persian: قوچ تپه
- Village
- Location within Iran
- Coordinates: 34°55′38″N 48°01′36″E
- Country: Iran
- Province: Hamadan
- County: Asadabad
- District: Central
- Rural District: Chaharduli

Population (2016)
  - Total: 383
- Time zone: UTC+3:30 (IRST)

Quch Tappeh (Persian: قوچ تپه) (Note: Also romanized as Qūch Tappeh; also known as Qūsh Tappeh) is a village in Chaharduli Rural District of the Central District in Asadabad County, Hamadan province, Iran.

== Demographics ==
=== Population ===
At the time of the 2006 National Census, the village's population was 411 in 82 households. The following census in 2011 counted 387 people in 101 households. The 2016 census measured the population of the village as 383 people in 107 households.
