= Holvar-e Sofla =

Holvar-e Sofla هلورسفلي
- Village
- Location within Iran
- Coordinates: 34°40′48″N 48°08′05″E
- Country: Iran
- Province: Hamadan
- County: Asadabad
- Bakhsh: Central
- Rural District: Seyyed Jamal ol Din

Population (2006)
  - Total: 373
- Time zone: UTC+3:30 (IRST)
  - Summer (DST): UTC+4:30 (IRDT)

Holvar-e Sofla (Persian: هلورسفلي, also Romanized as Holvar-e Soflá and Holver-e Soflá; also known as Halbaré Sofla, Ḩalvar-e Pā’īn, Holvar, and Ḩolvar-e Pā’īn) is a village in Seyyed Jamal ol Din Rural District, in the Central District of Asadabad County, Hamadan Province, Iran. At the 2006 census, its population was 373, in 93 families.
