= Dowlatabad, Asadabad =

Village in Hamadan province, Iran

Dowlatabad Persian: دولت اباد
- Village
- Location within Iran
- Coordinates: 34°40′43″N 48°01′00″E
- Country: Iran
- Province: Hamadan
- County: Asadabad
- District: Central
- Rural District: Jolgeh

Population (2016)
  - Total: 204
- Time zone: UTC+3:30 (IRST)

Dowlatabad (Persian: دولت اباد) (Note: Also romanized as Dowlatābād; also known as Daulatābād) is a village in Jolgeh Rural District of the Central District in Asadabad County, Hamadan province, Iran.

== Demographics ==
=== Population ===
At the time of the 2006 National Census, the village's population was 216 in 52 households. The following census in 2011 counted 214 people in 61 households. The 2016 census measured the population of the village as 204 people in 62 households.
