= Shamsabad, Asadabad =

Village in Hamadan province, Iran

Shamsabad Persian: شمس آباد
- Village
- Location within Iran
- Coordinates: 34°46′43″N 48°08′43″E
- Country: Iran
- Province: Hamadan
- County: Asadabad
- District: Central
- Rural District: Seyyed Jamal ol Din

Population (2016)
  - Total: 595
- Time zone: UTC+3:30 (IRST)

Shamsabad (Persian: شمس آباد) (Note: Also romanized as Shamsābād) is a village in Seyyed Jamal ol Din Rural District of the Central District in Asadabad County, Hamadan province, Iran.

== Demographics ==
=== Population ===
At the time of the 2016 National Census, the village's population was 595 in 166 households.
