= Gozar Gajin =

Village in Hamadan province, Iran

Gozar Gajin Persian: گذرگجين
- Village
- Location within Iran
- Coordinates: 34°47′21″N 48°02′48″E
- Country: Iran
- Province: Hamadan
- County: Asadabad
- District: Central
- Rural District: Darbandrud

Population (2016)
  - Total: 1,022
- Time zone: UTC+3:30 (IRST)

Gozar Gajin (Persian: گذرگجين) (Note: Also romanized as Goz̄ar Gajīn; also known as Goz̄ar Kajīn and Gozar Kajīn) is a village in Darbandrud Rural District of the Central District in Asadabad County, Hamadan province, Iran.

== Demographics ==
=== Population ===
At the time of the 2006 National Census, the village's population was 1,224 in 278 households. The following census in 2011 counted 1,189 people in 319 households. The 2016 census measured the population of the village as 1,022 people in 311 households.
