= Holvar =

Holvar and Holver (Persian: هلور) may refer to:

- Holvar-e Olya
- Holvar-e Sofla
