= Ahu Tappeh =

Village in Chaharduli Rural District, Asadabad County, Hamadan Province, Iran

Ahu Tappeh اهوتپه
- Village
- Location within Iran
- Coordinates: 34°56′16″N 48°00′04″E
- Country: Iran
- Province: Hamadan
- County: Asadabad
- Bakhsh: Central
- Rural District: Chaharduli

Population (2006)
  - Total: 293
- Time zone: UTC+3:30 (IRST)
  - Summer (DST): UTC+4:30 (IRDT)

Ahu Tappeh (Persian: اهوتپه, also Romanized as Āhū Tappeh) is a village in Chaharduli Rural District, in the Central District of Asadabad County, Hamadan Province, Iran. At the 2006 census, its population was 293, in 63 families.
