= Qomshaneh, Asadabad =

Qomshaneh قمشانه
- Village
- Location within Iran
- Coordinates: 34°55′06″N 47°57′24″E
- Country: Iran
- Province: Hamadan
- County: Asadabad
- Bakhsh: Central
- Rural District: Chaharduli

Population (2006)
  - Total: 98
- Time zone: UTC+3:30 (IRST)
  - Summer (DST): UTC+4:30 (IRDT)

Qomshaneh (Persian: قمشانه, also Romanized as Qomshāneh and Qomeshāneh; also known as Kumshāneh) is a village in Chaharduli Rural District, in the Central District of Asadabad County, Hamadan Province, Iran. At the 2006 census, its population was 98, in 24 families.

== Language ==
It is a Southern Kurdish speaking village.
