= Shahrab, Hamadan =

Shahrab شهرآب
- Village
- Location within Iran
- Coordinates: 34°47′52″N 48°09′37″E
- Country: Iran
- Province: Hamadan
- County: Asadabad
- Bakhsh: Central
- Rural District: Seyyed Jamal ol Din

Population (2006)
  - Total: 134
- Time zone: UTC+3:30 (IRST)
  - Summer (DST): UTC+4:30 (IRDT)

Shahrab (Persian: شهراب, also Romanized as Shahrāb and Shohrāb) is a village in Seyyed Jamal ol Din Rural District, in the Central District of Asadabad County, Hamadan Province, Iran. At the 2006 census, its population was 134, in 31 families.
