= Mavi, Hamadan =

Village in Hamadan province, Iran

Mavi Persian: ماوي
- Village
- Location within Iran
- Coordinates: 34°46′49″N 47°54′26″E
- Country: Iran
- Province: Hamadan
- County: Asadabad
- District: Pirsalman
- Rural District: Pirsalman

Population (2016)
  - Total: 186
- Time zone: UTC+3:30 (IRST)

Mavi (Persian: ماوي) (Note: Also romanized as Māvī; also known as Ma'vā and Ma‘vá) is a village in Pirsalman Rural District of Pirsalman District in Asadabad County, Hamadan province, Iran.

== Demographics ==
=== Population ===
At the time of the 2006 National Census, the village's population was 266 in 53 households, when it was in the Central District. The following census in 2011 counted 211 people in 62 households, by which time the rural district had been separated from the district in the formation of Pirsalman District. The 2016 census measured the population of the village as 186 people in 56 households.
