= Tavilan-e Olya =

Village in Hamadan province, Iran

Tavilan-e Olya Persian: طويلان عليا
- Village
- Location within Iran
- Coordinates: 34°48′40″N 47°54′44″E
- Country: Iran
- Province: Hamadan
- County: Asadabad
- District: Pirsalman
- Rural District: Kolyai

Population (2016)
  - Total: 386
- Time zone: UTC+3:30 (IRST)

Tavilan-e Olya (Persian: طويلان عليا) (Note: Also romanized as Ţavīlān-e ‘Olyā; also known as Ţavīlān-e Bālā) is a village in Kolyai Rural District of Pirsalman District in Asadabad County, Hamadan province, Iran.

== Demographics ==
=== Population ===
At the time of the 2006 National Census, the village's population was 450 in 103 households, when it was in the Central District. The following census in 2011 counted 428 people in 108 households, by which time the rural district had been separated from the district in the formation of Pirsalman District. The 2016 census measured the population of the village as 386 people in 121 households.
