= Tarkhinabad =

Village in Hamadan province, Iran

Tarkhinabad Persian: ترخين اباد
- Village
- Location within Iran
- Coordinates: 34°48′55″N 48°07′21″E
- Country: Iran
- Province: Hamadan
- County: Asadabad
- District: Central
- Rural District: Seyyed Jamal ol Din

Population (2016)
  - Total: 420
- Time zone: UTC+3:30 (IRST)

Tarkhinabad (Persian: ترخين اباد) (Note: Also romanized as Tarkhīnābād; also known as Tarfīnābād and Tarkhisābad) is a village in Seyyed Jamal ol Din Rural District of the Central District in Asadabad County, Hamadan province, Iran.

== Demographics ==
=== Population ===
At the time of the 2006 National Census, the village's population was 695 in 184 households. The following census in 2011 counted 633 people in 190 households. The 2016 census measured the population of the village as 420 people in 128 households.
