= Gavanlu =

Gavanlu (Persian: گوانلو or گونلو) may refer to:

- Gavanlu, East Azerbaijan (گونلو - Gavanlū)
- Gavanlu, Asadabad, Hamadan Province (گوانلو - Gavānlū)
- Gavanlu, Razan, Hamadan Province (گونلو - Gavanlū)
