= Mavi, Iran =

Mavi (Persian: ماوي) in Iran, may refer to:

- Mavi, Hamadan
- Mavi, Razavi Khorasan
