= Alinjeh =

Alinjeh (Persian: الينجه) may refer to:

- Alinjeh, East Azerbaijan
- Alinjeh, Zanjan

== See also ==
- Alenjeh
