= Saheb Ekhtiarieh Castle =

Castle in Hamadan Province, Iran

Saheb Ekhtiarieh castle
- قلعه صاحب اختیاریه

General information
- Type: Castle
- Location: Asadabad County, Iran

Saheb Ekhtiarieh castle (Persian: قلعه صاحب اختیاریه) is a historical castle located in Asadabad County in Hamadan Province, The longevity of this fortress dates back to the Qajar dynasty.
