= Qomshaneh =

Qomshaneh or Qomeshaneh (Persian: قمشانه) may refer to:

- Qomshaneh, Asadabad
- Qomshaneh, Famenin
