= Shahr Ab =

Shahr Ab or Shahrab or Shehrab or Shohrab (Persian: شهراب) may refer to:

- Shahrab, Hamadan
- Shahrab, Isfahan
- Shahr Ab, Markazi
- Shahrab, Yazd
