= Bujin (disambiguation) =

Bujin can refer to:

- Bujin, a village in Iran
- Bujin (Dragon Ball), a character in a 1993 Japanese fantasy martial arts film
- Cristina Ioana Bujin (born 1988), Romanian triple jumper
