= Deh Bureh =

Deh Bureh (Persian: ده بوره) may refer to:

- Deh Bureh, Asadabad
- Deh Bureh, Nahavand
