= Khondab (disambiguation) =

Khondab is a city in Markazi Province, Iran

Khondab or Khandab (Persian: جَنداب) may also refer to various places in Iran:

- Khondab, Hamadan, a village in Hamadan Province
- Khondab, Qazvin, a village in Qazvin Province
- Khondab, Qom, a village in Qom Province
- Khandab, Zanjan, a village in Zanjan Province
- Khondab County, in Markazi Province
- Khondab Rural District, in Markazi Province
