= Ajin, Asadabad =

City in Hamadan province, Iran

Ajin Persian: آجین
- City
- Location within Iran
- Coordinates: 34°44′09″N 47°55′32″E
- Country: Iran
- Province: Hamadan
- County: Asadabad
- District: Pirsalman
- Established as a city: 2011

Population (2016)
  - Total: 2,738
- Time zone: UTC+3:30 (IRST)

Ajin (Persian: آجین) (Note: Also romanized as Ājīn) is a city in, and the capital of, Pirsalman District in Asadabad County, Hamadan province, Iran. It also serves as the administrative center for Pirsalman Rural District.

== Demographics ==
=== Population ===
At the time of the 2006 National Census, Ajin had a population of 3,343 in 766 households, when it was still a village in Pirsalman Rural District of the Central District. The following census in 2011 recorded 3,194 people in 879 households, by which time the rural district had been separated from the district in the formation of Pirsalman District. The 2016 census reported a population of 2,738 in 822 households, when the village had been converted to a city.
