= Holvar-e Olya =

Village in Hamadan province, Iran

Holvar-e Olya Persian: هلورعليا
- Village
- Location within Iran
- Coordinates: 34°41′35″N 48°09′55″E
- Country: Iran
- Province: Hamadan
- County: Asadabad
- District: Central
- Rural District: Seyyed Jamal ol Din

Population (2016)
  - Total: 374
- Time zone: UTC+3:30 (IRST)

Holvar-e Olya (Persian: هلورعليا) (Note: Also romanized as Holvar-e ‘Olyā and Holver-e ‘Olyā; also known as Halbaré Olya, Holvar, and Ḩolvar-e Bālā) is a village in Seyyed Jamal ol Din Rural District of the Central District in Asadabad County, Hamadan province, Iran.

== Demographics ==
=== Population ===
At the time of the 2006 National Census, the village's population was 233 in 56 households. The following census in 2011 counted 414 people in 103 households. The 2016 census measured the population of the village as 374 people in 101 households.
