= Qara Kand =

Qara Kand or Qarakand (Persian: قراكند) may refer to:

- Karakend (Nagorno-Karabakh)
- Qara Kand, Asadabad, Hamadan Province, Iran
- Qarakand, Razan, Hamadan Province, Iran
- Qara Kand, West Azerbaijan, Iran
