= Gumala =

Gumala may refer to:

- Gumāla, another name for Gonbaleh, a village in Iran
- Gumala, the official name of HD 179949, a star in the constellation Sagittarius
