= Qaderabad, Asadabad =

Village in Hamadan province, Iran

Qaderabad Persian: قادراباد
- Village
- Location within Iran
- Coordinates: 34°58′53″N 48°02′12″E
- Country: Iran
- Province: Hamadan
- County: Asadabad
- District: Central
- Rural District: Chaharduli

Population (2016)
  - Total: 359
- Time zone: UTC+3:30 (IRST)

Qaderabad (Persian: قادراباد) (Note: Also romanized as Qāderābād; also known as Qādīrābād) is a village in Chaharduli Rural District of the Central District in Asadabad County, Hamadan province, Iran.

== Demographics ==
=== Population ===
At the time of the 2006 National Census, the village's population was 382 in 93 households. The following census in 2011 counted 349 people in 101 households. The 2016 census measured the population of the village as 359 people in 111 households.
