= Asadabad, Iran =

City in Hamadan province, Iran

Asadabad Persian: اسدآباد
- City
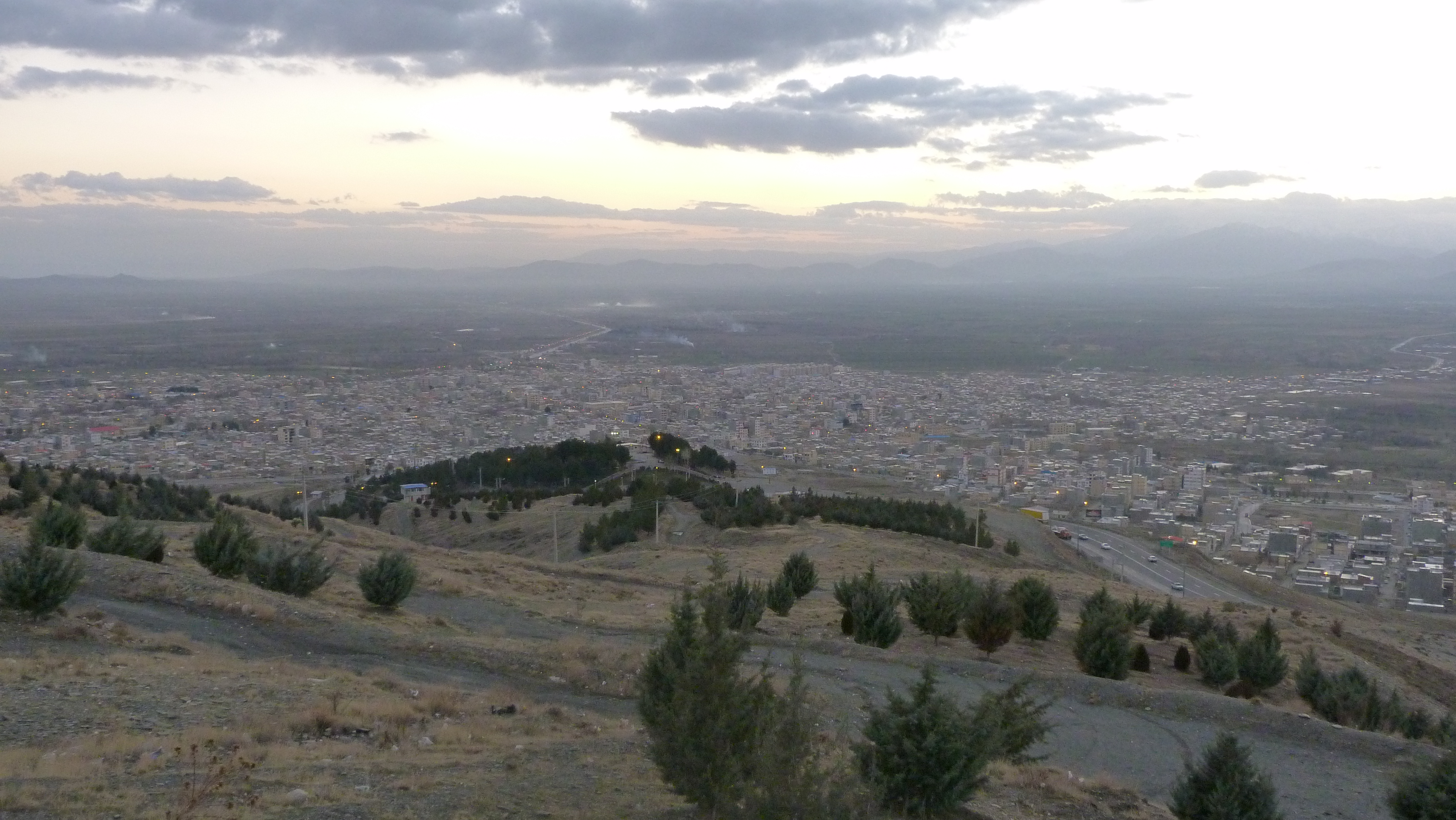
- Asadabad city from above

- Location within Iran
- Coordinates: 34°46′57″N 48°07′19″E
- Country: Iran
- Province: Hamadan
- County: Asadabad
- District: Central

Population (2016)
  - Total: 55,703
- Time zone: UTC+3:30 (IRST)

Asadabad (Persian: اسدآباد) (Note: Also romanized as Asadābād) is a city in the Central District of Asadabad County, Hamadan province, Iran, serving as capital of both the county and the district.

Asadabad is 54 kilometers southwest of Hamadan, the provincial capital, on the historic route from Baghdad to Hamadan and then on to Ray and Tehran. The Kuh-e Alvand, the innermost part of the Zagros mountains, separates Asadabad and Hamadan.

== History ==
Little is known about Asadabad's pre-Islamic history, although its strategic location suggests great antiquity. Wilhelm Tomaschek suggested a possible identification with the place named "Adrapana" by Isidore of Charax. Asadabad was an important royal site during the Sasanian period, with the 10th-century traveler Abu Dolaf Khazraji reporting that Mardanshah, son of the Sasanian ruler Khosrow II and his wife Shirin, lived here for some time. Another writer, Ibn al-Faqih, reported that the Sasanian emperors kept a palace at a nearby place called Āzarmīḏdoḵt. The most visible Sasanian ruins in medieval times was the site variously called the Maṭābeḵ Kesrā ("Kitchens of Chosroes") or the Ayvān al-Ṣanj ("Portico of the Cymbal") by medieval Muslim writers.

Early Islamic Asadabad was a small but prosperous city in the province of Jebal, surrounded by fertile farmlands that produced cereals, cotton, fruit, and especially honey. These farmlands were irrigated by waters brought down from the Kuh-e Alvand via qanats. In 810-11, during the Fourth Fitna, a battle was fought at Asadabad between the forces of al-Amin and al-Ma'mun, two sons of the Abbasid caliph Harun al-Rashid. Al-Ma'mun's general Taher Dhu'l-Yaminayn, who would later go on to found the Tahirid dynasty of Khorasan, defeated al-Amin's commander Abd-al-Rahman ibn Jabala Abnawi, who was killed in battle. As a result of this battle, al-Ma'mun's forces were able to take control of the entire province of Jebal.

In the early 11th century, Asadabad was contested between different factions within the Kurdish Hasanwayhid dynasty. Later, in 1023-24, the Daylamite Kakuyid ruler Mohammad ibn Rostam Doshmanziyar took control of the city. Another battle was fought at Asadabad in 1120, when Mas'ud ibn Mohammad, the governor of Mosul, al-Jazira, and Azerbaijan, unsuccessfully rebelled against the Seljuq emperor Mahmud II.

Asadabad continued to thrive under Ilkhanid rule; the 14th-century writer Hamdallah Mustawfi recorded that 35 villages were dependent on Asadabad, with the total revenue of the district amounting to 15,000 dinars. It was a minor center of Islamic scholarship, with the writer al-Sam'ani listing several notable scholars from Asadabad.

At some point after this, however, Asadabad shrank to the size of a large village. In 1877, the European traveler H.W. Bellew counted 200 houses in Asadabad, and noted the presence of a Jewish community in the town.

It has been suggested that the 19th-century Islamic activist Jamal al-Din al-Afghani, who said that he was from Asadabad in Afghanistan, was actually from an Iranian Shi'i family from this Asadabad, near Hamadan.

== Demographics ==
=== Language ===
In 1951, Asadabad was home to some 7,000 people, most of whom spoke Persian, with a minority of Kurdish and Turkish speakers also present. In 2000, linguist Fattah stated that the town had a Kurdish majority with a significant Persian and Turkic minority.

In 2020, the language distribution was as follows:

Asadabad linguistic composition
language	percent
Northern Luri	35%
Southern Kurdish	25%
Standard Persian	20%
Turkic	15%
Laki	5%

=== Population ===
At the time of the 2006 National Census, the city's population was 51,304 in 12,583 households. The following census in 2011 counted 55,024 people in 15,164 households. The 2016 census measured the population of the city as 55,703 people in 16,765 households.
