= Pirsalman Rural District =

Rural district in Hamadan province, Iran

Pirsalman Rural District Persian: دهستان پيرسليمان
- Rural District
- Location within Iran
- Coordinates: 34°41′22″N 47°55′30″E
- Country: Iran
- Province: Hamadan
- County: Asadabad
- District: Pirsalman
- Established: 1987
- Capital: Ajin

Population (2016)
  - Total: 5,059
- Time zone: UTC+3:30 (IRST)

Pirsalman Rural District (Persian: دهستان پيرسليمان) is in Pirsalman District of Asadabad County, Hamadan province, Iran. It is administered from the city of Ajin.

== Demographics ==
=== Population ===
At the time of the 2006 National Census, the rural district's population (as a part of the Central District) was 6,835 in 1,617 households. There were 9,385 inhabitants in 2,562 households at the following census of 2011, by which time the rural district had been separated from the district in the formation of Pirsalman District. The 2016 census measured the population of the rural district as 5,059 in 1,608 households. The most populous of its 22 villages was Lak Lak, with 868 people.

=== Other villages in the rural district ===
- Alanjeh
- Bitervan
- Ganjeh
- Gonbaleh
- Habashi
- Jafarabad
- Kavanaj
- Mavi
- Monavar Tappeh
- Najafabad
- Nosratabad-e Laklak
- Pir Yusof
- Qasemabad-e Laklak
- Sadeqabad
- Sirdarreh
