= Paliz =

City in Hamadan province, Iran

Paliz Persian: پالیز
- City
- Location within Iran
- Coordinates: 34°43′56″N 48°05′13″E
- Country: Iran
- Province: Hamadan
- County: Asadabad
- District: Central
- Established as a city: 2020

Population (2016)
  - Total: 2,418
- Time zone: UTC+3:30 (IRST)

Paliz (Persian: پالیز) (Note: Formerly known as Jannatabad (جنت‌آباد), also romanized as Jannatābād and Jennatābād) is a city in the Central District of Asadabad County, Hamadan province, Iran. As the village of Jannatabad, it was the capital of Seyyed Jamal ol Din Rural District until its capital was transferred to the village of Vandarabad.

== Demographics ==
=== Population ===
At the time of the 2006 National Census, the village's population was 2,460 in 623 households, when it was the village of Jannatabad in Seyyed Jamal ol Din Rural District. The following census in 2011 counted 2,729 people in 729 households. The 2016 census measured the population of the village as 2,418 people in 763 households, the most populous in its rural district.

Jannatabad was merged with the village of Mazraeh-ye Bid, converted to a city, and renamed Paliz in 2020.
