= Qaderabad, Saqqez =

Qaderabad قادر آباد
- Village
- Location within Iran
- Coordinates: 36°09′46″N 46°48′57″E
- Country: Iran
- Province: Kurdistan
- County: Saqqez
- Bakhsh: Ziviyeh
- Rural District: Tilakuh

Population (2006)
  - Total: 204
- Time zone: UTC+3:30 (IRST)
  - Summer (DST): UTC+4:30 (IRDT)

Qaderabad (Persian: قادر آباد, also Romanized as Qāderābād) is a village in Tilakuh Rural District, Ziviyeh District, Saqqez County, Kurdistan Province, Iran. At the 2006 census, its population was 204, in 42 families. The village is populated by Kurds.
