= Aminabad, Piranshahr =

Aminabad امين اباد
- Village
- Location within Iran
- Coordinates: 36°39′12″N 45°10′35″E
- Country: Iran
- Province: West Azerbaijan
- County: Piranshahr
- Bakhsh: Central
- Rural District: Piran

Population (2006)
  - Total: 165
- Time zone: UTC+3:30 (IRST)
  - Summer (DST): UTC+4:30 (IRDT)

Aminabad (Persian: امين اباد, also Romanized as Amīnābād) is a village in Piran Rural District, in the Central District of Piranshahr County, West Azerbaijan Province, Iran. At the 2006 census, its population was 165, in 24 families.
