= Siah Kamar-e Sofla =

Siah Kamar-e Sofla سياه كمرسفلي
- Village
- Location within Iran
- Coordinates: 34°10′55″N 46°53′17″E
- Country: Iran
- Province: Kermanshah
- County: Kermanshah
- Bakhsh: Mahidasht
- Rural District: Mahidasht

Population (2006)
  - Total: 123
- Time zone: UTC+3:30 (IRST)
  - Summer (DST): UTC+4:30 (IRDT)

Siah Kamar-e Sofla (Persian: سياه كمرسفلي, also Romanized as Sīāh Kamar-e Soflá; also known as Sīāh Kamar-e Morād Pāshābī and Sīāh Kamar-e Pā'īn) is a village in Mahidasht Rural District, Mahidasht District, Kermanshah County, Kermanshah Province, Iran. At the 2006 census, its population was 123, in 31 families.
