= Aminabad, Esfarayen =

Aminabad امين اباد
- Village
- Location within Iran
- Coordinates: 37°07′37″N 57°27′50″E
- Country: Iran
- Province: North Khorasan
- County: Esfarayen
- Bakhsh: Central
- Rural District: Ruin

Population (2006)
  - Total: 182
- Time zone: UTC+3:30 (IRST)
  - Summer (DST): UTC+4:30 (IRDT)

Aminabad (Persian: امين اباد, also Romanized as Amīnābād) is a village in Ruin Rural District, in the Central District of Esfarayen County, North Khorasan Province, Iran. At the 2006 census, its population was 182, in 48 families.
