= Taviran-e Olya =

Taviran-e Olya طاويران عليا
- Village
- Location within Iran
- Coordinates: 34°01′58″N 47°00′30″E
- Country: Iran
- Province: Kermanshah
- County: Kermanshah
- Bakhsh: Firuzabad
- Rural District: Sar Firuzabad

Population (2006)
  - Total: 293
- Time zone: UTC+3:30 (IRST)
  - Summer (DST): UTC+4:30 (IRDT)

Taviran-e Olya (Persian: طاويران عليا, also Romanized as Ţāvīrān-e ‘Olyā; also known as Ţāvīrān) is a village in Sar Firuzabad Rural District, Firuzabad District, Kermanshah County, Kermanshah Province, Iran. At the 2006 census, its population was 293, in 67 families.
