= Qaderabad, Mirjaveh =

Qaderabad قادر آباد
- Village
- Location within Iran
- Coordinates: 28°11′46″N 61°28′19″E
- Country: Iran
- Province: Sistan and Baluchestan
- County: Mirjaveh
- Bakhsh: Central
- Rural District: Ladiz

Population (2006)
  - Total: 46
- Time zone: UTC+3:30 (IRST)
  - Summer (DST): UTC+4:30 (IRDT)

Qaderabad (Persian: قادر آباد, also Romanized as Qāderābād) is a village in Ladiz Rural District, in the Central District of Mirjaveh County, Sistan and Baluchestan Province, Iran. At the 2006 census, its population was 46, in 9 families.
