= Qeshlaq-e Aminabad =

Qeshlaq-e Aminabad قشلاق امين اباد
- Village
- Location within Iran
- Coordinates: 35°47′43″N 50°01′34″E
- Country: Iran
- Province: Qazvin
- County: Buin Zahra
- Bakhsh: Central
- Rural District: Zahray-ye Bala

Population (2006)
  - Total: 239
- Time zone: UTC+3:30 (IRST)
  - Summer (DST): UTC+4:30 (IRDT)

Qeshlaq-e Aminabad (Persian: قشلاق امين اباد, also Romanized as Qeshlāq-e Amīnābād; also known as Amīnābād) is a village in Zahray-ye Bala Rural District, in the Central District of Buin Zahra County, Qazvin Province, Iran. At the 2006 census, its population was 239, in 49 families.
