= Kolyai Rural District =

Rural district in Hamadan province, Iran

Kolyai Rural District Persian: دهستان كليائي
- Rural District
- Location within Iran
- Coordinates: 34°49′N 47°53′E
- Country: Iran
- Province: Hamadan
- County: Asadabad
- District: Pirsalman
- Established: 1993
- Capital: Tavilan-e Sofla

Population (2016)
  - Total: 3,028
- Time zone: UTC+3:30 (IRST)

Kolyai Rural District (Persian: دهستان كليائي) is in Pirsalman District of Asadabad County, Hamadan province, Iran. Its capital is the village of Tavilan-e Sofla.

== Demographics ==
=== Ethnicity ===
The rural district is populated by Kurds.

=== Population ===
At the time of the 2006 National Census, the rural district's population (as a part of the Central District) was 3,909 in 871 households. There were 3,354 inhabitants in 914 households at the following census of 2011, by which time the rural district had been separated from the district in the formation of Pirsalman District. The 2016 census measured the population of the rural district as 3,028 in 950 households. The most populous of its 14 villages was Tavilan-e Sofla, with 927 people.

=== Other villages in the rural district ===
- Chahar Cheshmeh
- Cheshmeh Ali
- Deh Bureh
- Deh Sefid
- Godar Pahn
- Heydarabad
- Hoseynabad
- Keyni Sayeh
- Meyvaleh
- Rostamabad
- Takhtiabad
- Tavilan-e Olya
