= Tazeh Kand, Ujan-e Sharqi =

Tazeh Kand تازه كند
- Village
- Location within Iran
- Coordinates: 37°44′00″N 46°51′00″E
- Country: Iran
- Province: East Azerbaijan
- County: Bostanabad
- Bakhsh: Tekmeh Dash
- Rural District: Ujan-e Sharqi

Population (2006)
  - Total: 134
- Time zone: UTC+3:30 (IRST)
  - Summer (DST): UTC+4:30 (IRDT)

Tazeh Kand (Persian: تازه كند, also Romanized as Tāzeh Kand; also known as Amīnābād and Tāzeh Kand-e Ūjān) is a village in Ujan-e Sharqi Rural District, Tekmeh Dash District, Bostanabad County, East Azerbaijan Province, Iran. At the 2006 census, its population was 134, in 31 families.
