= Kawana Station =

Kawana Station is the name of two train stations in Japan:

- Kawana Station (Shizuoka) (川奈駅) in Shizuoka Prefecture
- Kawana Station (Nagoya) (川名駅) in Nagoya, Aichi Prefecture
