= Qaderabad, Irandegan =

Qaderabad قادراباد
- Village
- Location within Iran
- Coordinates: 27°47′06″N 61°18′03″E
- Country: Iran
- Province: Sistan and Baluchestan
- County: Khash
- Bakhsh: Irandegan
- Rural District: Kahnuk

Population (2006)
  - Total: 13
- Time zone: UTC+3:30 (IRST)
  - Summer (DST): UTC+4:30 (IRDT)

Qaderabad (Persian: قادراباد, also Romanized as Qāderābād; also known as Ghāder Abad) is a village in Kahnuk Rural District, Irandegan District, Khash County, Sistan and Baluchestan Province, Iran. At the 2006 census, its population was 13, in 4 families.
