= Aminabad, Malard =

Aminabad امين اباد
- Village
- Country: Iran
- Province: Tehran
- County: Malard
- Bakhsh: Central
- Rural District: Bibi Sakineh

Population (2006)
  - Total: 210
- Time zone: UTC+3:30 (IRST)
  - Summer (DST): UTC+4:30 (IRDT)

Aminabad (Persian: امين اباد, also Romanized as Āmīnābād) is a village in Bibi Sakineh Rural District, in the Central District of Malard County, Tehran Province, Iran. At the 2006 census, its population was 210, in 48 families.
