= Aminabad, Fars =

Aminabad امین‌آباد
- Village
- Location within Iran
- Coordinates: 28°49′38″N 52°31′06″E
- Country: Iran
- Province: Fars
- County: Firuzabad
- Bakhsh: Central
- Rural District: Ahmadabad

Population (2006)
  - Total: 466
- Time zone: UTC+3:30 (IRST)
  - Summer (DST): UTC+4:30 (IRDT)

Aminabad (Persian: امین‌آباد, also Romanized as Amīnābād) is a village in Ahmadabad Rural District, in the Central District of Firuzabad County, Fars province, Iran. At the 2006 census, its population was 466, in 95 families.
