= Qaderabad-e Murtan =

Qaderabad-e Murtan قادرابادمورتان
- Village
- Location within Iran
- Coordinates: 27°19′13″N 60°46′44″E
- Country: Iran
- Province: Sistan and Baluchestan
- County: Iranshahr
- Bakhsh: Central
- Rural District: Damen

Population (2006)
  - Total: 717
- Time zone: UTC+3:30 (IRST)
  - Summer (DST): UTC+4:30 (IRDT)

Qaderabad-e Murtan (Persian: قادرابادمورتان, also Romanized as Qāderābād-e Mūrtān; also known as Ghader Abad, Kādarābād, and Qāderābād) is a village in Damen Rural District, in the Central District of Iranshahr County, Sistan and Baluchestan Province, Iran. At the 2006 census, its population was 717, in 149 families.
