= Taviran-e Sofla =

Village in Kermanshah, Iran

Taviran-e Sofla طاويران سفلي
- Village
- Location within Iran
- Coordinates: 34°01′56″N 47°01′08″E
- Country: Iran
- Province: Kermanshah
- County: Kermanshah
- Bakhsh: Firuzabad
- Rural District: Sar Firuzabad

Population (2006)
  - Total: 100
- Time zone: UTC+3:30 (IRST)
  - Summer (DST): UTC+4:30 (IRDT)

Taviran-e Sofla (Persian: طاويران سفلي, also Romanized as Ţāvīrān-e Soflá; also known as Ţāvīrān-e Vostá) is a village in Sar Firuzabad Rural District, Firuzabad District, Kermanshah County, Kermanshah Province, Iran. At the 2006 census, its population was 100, in 25 families.
