= Qaderabad, Arzuiyeh =

Qaderabad قادراباد
- Village
- Location within Iran
- Coordinates: 28°19′30″N 56°33′58″E
- Country: Iran
- Province: Kerman
- County: Arzuiyeh
- Bakhsh: Central
- Rural District: Arzuiyeh

Population (2006)
  - Total: 95
- Time zone: UTC+3:30 (IRST)
  - Summer (DST): UTC+4:30 (IRDT)

Qaderabad (Persian: قادراباد, also Romanized as Qāderābād) is a village in Arzuiyeh Rural District, in the Central District of Arzuiyeh County, Kerman Province, Iran. At the 2006 census, its population was 95, in 20 families.
