= Te Ahu Davis =

New Zealand cricketer (born 1985)

Te Ahu Trevor Davis (born 9 December 1985 in Auckland) is a New Zealand cricketer who played in the Under-19 Cricket World Cup in 2004. He is a right-handed batsman and right arm fast-medium bowler who plays his domestic cricket for Northern Districts. Davis made his first-class debut in 2004–05 against Otago, trapping Mohammad Wasim lbw to claim his first wicket at that level.
