= Mulla Wali Waleh =

Village in Kandahar Province, Afghanistan

- Village
- Location in Afghanistan
- Coordinates: 31°10′46″N 66°34′35″E
- Country: Afghanistan
- Province: Kandahar Province
- District: Spin Boldak District
- Time zone: + 4.30

Mulla Wali Waleh (Pashto: ملا ولي ولي) is a village in Kandahar Province, in southern Afghanistan. It lies in the Spin Boldak District.

== See also ==
- Kandahar Province
