= Siah Kamar, Kermanshah =

Siah Kamar سياه كمر
- Village
- Location within Iran
- Coordinates: 34°20′55″N 46°59′35″E
- Country: Iran
- Province: Kermanshah
- County: Kermanshah
- Bakhsh: Central
- Rural District: Baladarband

Population (2006)
  - Total: 1,029
- Time zone: UTC+3:30 (IRST)
  - Summer (DST): UTC+4:30 (IRDT)

Siah Kamar (Persian: سياه كمر, also Romanized as Sīāh Kamar and Sīyāh Kamar) is a village in Baladarband Rural District, in the Central District of Kermanshah County, Kermanshah Province, Iran. At the 2006 census, its population was 1,029, in 209 families.
