= Siah Kamar-e Olya =

Siah Kamar-e Olya سياه كمرعليا
- Village
- Location within Iran
- Coordinates: 34°11′00″N 46°50′00″E
- Country: Iran
- Province: Kermanshah
- County: Kermanshah
- Bakhsh: Mahidasht
- Rural District: Mahidasht

Population (2006)
  - Total: 61
- Time zone: UTC+3:30 (IRST)
  - Summer (DST): UTC+4:30 (IRDT)

Siah Kamar-e Olya (Persian: سياه كمرعليا, also Romanized as Sīāh Kamar-e ‘Olyā; also known as Sīāh Kamar-e Bālā) is a village in Mahidasht Rural District, Mahidasht District, Kermanshah County, Kermanshah Province, Iran. At the 2006 census, its population was 61, in 12 families.
