= Siah Kamar-e Olya Maruf =

Siah Kamar-e Olya Maruf سياكمرعليامعروف
- Village
- Location within Iran
- Coordinates: 34°09′48″N 46°52′18″E
- Country: Iran
- Province: Kermanshah
- County: Kermanshah
- Bakhsh: Mahidasht
- Rural District: Mahidasht

Population (2006)
  - Total: 21
- Time zone: UTC+3:30 (IRST)
  - Summer (DST): UTC+4:30 (IRDT)

Siah Kamar-e Olya Maruf (Persian: سياكمرعليامعروف, also Romanized as Sīāh Kamar-e ‘Olyā Ma‘rūf; also known as Sīāh Kamar-e Ma‘rūf and Sīāh Kamar-e ‘Olyā) is a village in Mahidasht Rural District, Mahidasht District, Kermanshah County, Kermanshah Province, Iran. At the 2006 census, its population was 21, in 6 families.
