= Qaderabad, Narmashir =

Qaderabad قادراباد
- Village
- Location within Iran
- Coordinates: 28°55′44″N 58°29′59″E
- Country: Iran
- Province: Kerman
- County: Narmashir
- Bakhsh: Rud Ab
- Rural District: Rud Ab-e Gharbi

Population (2006)
  - Total: 522
- Time zone: UTC+3:30 (IRST)
  - Summer (DST): UTC+4:30 (IRDT)

Qaderabad (Persian: قادراباد, also Romanized as Qāderābād; also known as Ghader Abad) is a village in Rud Ab-e Gharbi Rural District, Rud Ab District, Narmashir County, Kerman Province, Iran. At the 2006 census, its population was 522, in 127 families.
