= Aminabad, Bijar =

Aminabad امين آباد
- Village
- Location within Iran
- Coordinates: 35°31′21″N 47°36′11″E
- Country: Iran
- Province: Kurdistan
- County: Bijar
- Bakhsh: Chang Almas
- Rural District: Khosrowabad

Population (2006)
  - Total: 43
- Time zone: UTC+3:30 (IRST)
  - Summer (DST): UTC+4:30 (IRDT)

Aminabad (Persian: امين آباد, also Romanized as Amīnābād) is a village in Khosrowabad Rural District, Chang Almas District, Bijar County, Kurdistan province, Iran. At the 2006 census, its population was 43, in 11 families. The village is populated by Kurds.
