= Qaderabad, Negin Kavir =

Qaderabad قادراباد
- Village
- Location within Iran
- Coordinates: 28°45′48″N 59°00′57″E
- Country: Iran
- Province: Kerman
- County: Fahraj
- Bakhsh: Negin Kavir
- Rural District: Chahdegal

Population (2006)
  - Total: 46
- Time zone: UTC+3:30 (IRST)
  - Summer (DST): UTC+4:30 (IRDT)

Qaderabad (Persian: قادراباد, also Romanized as Qāderābād; also known as Qāderābād-e Pā’īn) is a village in Chahdegal Rural District, Negin Kavir District, Fahraj County, Kerman Province, Iran. At the 2006 census, its population was 46, in 12 families.
