= Aminabad, Sindh =

Aminabad (Urdu: امين آباد) is a subdivision of Hyderabad District in Sindh, Pakistan. It is a mainly Ismaili community, it is located at 28°56'20N 70°48'15E.
