= Kolyai, Kermanshah =

Village in Iranian Kurdistan, Iran

Kolyai كليايي
- village
- Location within Iran
- Coordinates: 34°16′38″N 46°48′48″E
- Country: Iran
- Province: Iranian Kurdistan
- County: Kermanshah
- Bakhsh: Mahidasht
- Rural District: Mahidasht

Population (2006)
  - Total: 357
- Time zone: UTC+3:30 (IRST)
  - Summer (DST): UTC+4:30 (IRDT)

Kolyai (Persian: كليايي, also Romanized as Kolyā'ī, Kurdish: Kolyanî, Kolyaî) is a village in Mahidasht Rural District, Mahidasht District, Kermanshah County, Kermanshah Province, Rojhilat Kurdistan Iran. At the 2006 census, its population was 357, in 82 families.
