= Kawana (surname) =

Kawana is a surname. Notable people with the surname include:

- Albert Kawana (born 1956), Namibian politician
- Koichi Kawana (born 1930), Japanese academic
- Machiko Kawana (born 1983), Japanese voice actress
- Mariko Kawana (born 1967), Japanese actress
- Nicola Kawana (born 1970), New Zealand actress
