= Aminabad-e Qaslan =

Aminabad-e Qaslan امين آباد قصلان
- Village
- Location within Iran
- Coordinates: 35°12′49″N 47°50′42″E
- Country: Iran
- Province: Kurdistan
- County: Qorveh
- Bakhsh: Serishabad
- Rural District: Qaslan

Population (2006)
  - Total: 167
- Time zone: UTC+3:30 (IRST)
  - Summer (DST): UTC+4:30 (IRDT)

Aminabad-e Qaslan (Persian: امين آباد قصلان, also Romanized as Amīnābād-e Qaşlān; also known as Amīnābād and Mīnehābāb) is a village in Qaslan Rural District, Serishabad District, Qorveh County, Kurdistan Province, Iran. At the 2006 census, its population was 167, in 46 families. The village is populated by Kurds.
