= Aminabad, Roshtkhar =

Aminabad امين آباد
- Village
- Location within Iran
- Coordinates: 34°58′44″N 59°43′14″E
- Country: Iran
- Province: Razavi Khorasan
- County: Roshtkhar
- Bakhsh: Central
- Rural District: Roshtkhar

Population (2006)
  - Total: 329
- Time zone: UTC+3:30 (IRST)
  - Summer (DST): UTC+4:30 (IRDT)

Aminabad (Persian: امين آباد, also Romanized as Amīnābād; also known as Amīnābād-e Rashtkhvār) is a village in Roshtkhar Rural District, in the Central District of Roshtkhar County, Razavi Khorasan Province, Iran. At the 2006 census, its population was 329, in 80 families.

== See also ==
- List of cities, towns and villages in Razavi Khorasan Province
