= Aminabad-e Hayateh Bozorg =

Aminabad-e Hayateh Bozorg امين آباد حياته بزرگ
- Village
- Location within Iran
- Coordinates: 35°05′00″N 47°47′14″E
- Country: Iran
- Province: Kurdistan
- County: Qorveh
- Bakhsh: Central
- Rural District: Badr

Population (2006)
  - Total: 330
- Time zone: UTC+3:30 (IRST)
  - Summer (DST): UTC+4:30 (IRDT)

Aminabad-e Hayateh Bozorg (Persian: امين آباد حياته بزرگ, also Romanized as Amīnābād-e Hayāteh Bozorg; also known as Amīnābād and Mīnābād) is a village in Badr Rural District, in the Central District of Qorveh County, Kurdistan Province, Iran. At the 2006 census, its population was 330, in 65 families. The village is populated by Kurds.
