= Qaderabad, Kabudarahang =

Qaderabad قادراباد
- Village
- Location within Iran
- Coordinates: 35°27′48″N 48°16′50″E
- Country: Iran
- Province: Hamadan
- County: Kabudarahang
- Bakhsh: Shirin Su
- Rural District: Shirin Su

Population (2006)
  - Total: 519
- Time zone: UTC+3:30 (IRST)
  - Summer (DST): UTC+4:30 (IRDT)

Qaderabad (Persian: قادراباد, also Romanized as Qāderābād; also known as Ghader Abad Mehraban and Qādīrābād) is a village in Shirin Su Rural District, Shirin Su District, Kabudarahang County, Hamadan Province, Iran. At the 2006 census, its population was 519, in 107 families.
