= Darbandrud Rural District =

Rural district in Hamadan province, Iran

Darbandrud Rural District Persian: دهستان دربندرود
- Rural District
- Location within Iran
- Coordinates: 34°47′N 48°01′E
- Country: Iran
- Province: Hamadan
- County: Asadabad
- District: Central
- Established: 1987
- Capital: Yusefabad

Population (2016)
  - Total: 11,413
- Time zone: UTC+3:30 (IRST)

Darbandrud Rural District (Persian: دهستان دربندرود) is in the Central District of Asadabad County, Hamadan province, Iran. Its capital is the village of Yusefabad.

== Demographics ==
=== Population ===
At the time of the 2006 National Census, the rural district's population was 13,054 in 3,073 households. There were 12,952 inhabitants in 3,459 households at the following census of 2011. The 2016 census measured the population of the rural district as 11,413 in 3,304 households. The most populous of its 14 villages was Chenar-e Sofla, with 3,628 people.

=== Other villages in the rural district ===
- Ahmadabad
- Deh Now
- Gozar Gajin
- Hesamabad
- Khakriz
- Siravand
