= Seyyed Jamal ol Din Rural District =

Rural district in Hamadan province, Iran

Seyyed Jamal ol Din Rural District Persian: دهستان سيد جمال الدين
- Rural District
- Location within Iran
- Coordinates: 34°46′N 48°10′E
- Country: Iran
- Province: Hamadan
- County: Asadabad
- District: Central
- Established: 1987
- Capital: Vandarabad

Population (2016)
  - Total: 11,517
- Time zone: UTC+3:30 (IRST)

Seyyed Jamal ol Din Rural District (Persian: دهستان سيد جمال الدين) is in the Central District of Asadabad County, Hamadan province, Iran. Its capital is the village of Vandarabad. The previous capital of the rural district was the village of Jannatabad, now the city of Paliz.

== Demographics ==
=== Population ===
At the time of the 2006 National Census, the rural district's population was 13,428 in 3,294 households. There were 12,800 inhabitants in 3,518 households at the following census of 2011. The 2016 census measured the population of the rural district as 11,517 in 3,517 households. The most populous of its 26 villages was Jannatabad (now the city of Paliz), with 2,418 people.

=== Other villages in the rural district ===
- Bad Khvoreh
- Holvar-e Olya
- Hudaraj
- Nosratabad-e Behraz
- Shamsabad
- Tarkhinabad
