= Jolgeh Rural District (Asadabad County) =

Rural district in Hamadan province, Iran

Jolgeh Rural District Persian: دهستان جلگه
- Rural District
- Location within Iran
- Coordinates: 34°39′N 48°03′E
- Country: Iran
- Province: Hamadan
- County: Asadabad
- District: Central
- Established: 1987
- Capital: Musaabad

Population (2016)
  - Total: 3,138
- Time zone: UTC+3:30 (IRST)

Jolgeh Rural District (Persian: دهستان جلگه) is in the Central District of Asadabad County, Hamadan province, Iran. Its capital is the village of Musaabad.

== Demographics ==
=== Language and ethnicity ===
In 2000, of the 68 villages, 30 were populated by Kurds, 16 by Turkic people and one mixed Kurdish-Turkic village. About 65% of the rural district was estimated as being Kurdish, while the remaining 35% was Turcophone.

=== Population ===
At the time of the 2006 National Census, the rural district's population was 6,669 in 1,574 households. There were 3,722 inhabitants in 1,038 households at the following census of 2011. The 2016 census measured the population of the rural district as 3,138 in 968 households. The most populous of its 12 villages was Musaabad, with 1,218 people.

=== Other villages in the rural district ===
- Aliabad-e Pir Shams ol Din
- Bifanaj
- Cheshmeh Qandab
- Dowlatabad
- Pir Shams ol Din
- Pol-e Shekasteh
- Seyfabad
- Valiabad
