= Chaharduli Rural District (Asadabad County) =

Rural district in Hamadan province, Iran

Chaharduli Rural District Persian: دهستان چهاردولي
- Rural District
- Location within Iran
- Coordinates: 34°54′N 48°02′E
- Country: Iran
- Province: Hamadan
- County: Asadabad
- District: Central
- Established: 1987
- Capital: Chenar-e Olya

Population (2016)
  - Total: 8,003
- Time zone: UTC+3:30 (IRST)

Chaharduli Rural District (Persian: دهستان چهاردولي) is in the Central District of Asadabad County, Hamadan province, Iran. Its capital is the village of Chenar-e Olya.

== Demographics ==
=== Ethnicity ===
All villages in the rural district are populated by Kurds, except Chenar-e Olya which is mixed Kurdish and Turkic.

=== Population ===
At the time of the 2006 National Census, the rural district's population was 9,367 in 2,155 households. There were 9,291 inhabitants in 2,493 households at the following census of 2011. The 2016 census measured the population of the rural district as 8,003 in 2,374 households. The most populous of its 28 villages was Chenar-e Olya, with 2,020 people.

=== Other villages in the rural district ===
- Hasanabad-e Emam
- Kamak-e Sofla
- Mohammadabad
- Pir Malu
- Qaderabad
- Qarah Bolagh
- Quch Tappeh
