= Pirsalman District =

District in Hamadan province, Iran

Pirsalman District Persian: بخش پیرسلمان
- District
- Location within Iran
- Coordinates: 34°44′N 47°54′E
- Country: Iran
- Province: Hamadan
- County: Asadabad
- Established: 2009
- Capital: Ajin

Population (2016)
  - Total: 10,825
- Time zone: UTC+3:30 (IRST)

Pirsalman District (Persian: بخش پیرسلمان) is in Asadabad County, Hamadan province, Iran. Its capital is the city of Ajin.

== History ==
In 2009, Kolyai and Pirsalman Rural Districts were separated from the Central District in the formation of Pirsalman District. The village of Ajin was converted to a city in 2011.

== Demographics ==
=== Population ===
At the time of the 2011 National Census, the district's population was 12,739 in 3,476 households. The 2016 census measured the population of the district as 10,825 inhabitants in 3,380 households.

=== Administrative divisions ===
Pirsalman District Population
| Administrative Divisions | 2011 | 2016 |
|---|---|---|
| Kolyai RD | 3,354 | 3,028 |
| Pirsalman RD | 9,385 | 5,059 |
| Ajin (city) | | 2,738 |
| Total | 12,739 | 10,825 |
RD = Rural District
