= Central District (Asadabad County) =

District in Hamadan province, Iran

Central District (Asadabad County) Persian: بخش مرکزی شهرستان اسدآباد
- District
- Location within Iran
- Coordinates: 34°47′N 48°05′E
- Country: Iran
- Province: Hamadan
- County: Asadabad
- Established: 1990
- Capital: Asadabad

Population (2016)
  - Total: 89,774
- Time zone: UTC+3:30 (IRST)

The Central District of Asadabad County (Persian: بخش مرکزی شهرستان اسدآباد) is in Hamadan province, Iran. Its capital is the city of Asadabad.

== History ==
In 2009, Kolyai and Pirsalman Rural Districts were separated from the district in the formation of Pirsalman District. The village of Jannatabad was converted to a city and renamed Paliz in 2020.

== Demographics ==
=== Population ===
At the time of the 2006 National Census, the district's population was 104,566 in 25,167 households. The following census in 2011 counted 93,789 people in 25,672 households. The 2016 census measured the population of the district as 89,774 inhabitants in 26,928 households.

=== Administrative divisions ===
Central District (Asadabad County) Population
Administrative Divisions	2006	2011	2016
Chaharduli RD	9,367	9,291	8,003
Darbandrud RD	13,054	12,952	11,413
Jolgeh RD	6,669	3,722	3,138
Kolyai RD (Note: Transferred to Pirsalman District)	3,909		
Pirsalman RD	6,835		
Seyyed Jamal ol Din RD	13,428	12,800	11,517
Asadabad (city)	51,304	55,024	55,703
Paliz (city) (Note: Formerly the village of Jannatabad; became a city after the 2016 census)			
Total	104,566	93,789	89,774
RD = Rural District
