= Asadabad County =

County in Hamadan province, Iran

Asadabad County Persian: شهرستان اسدآباد
- County
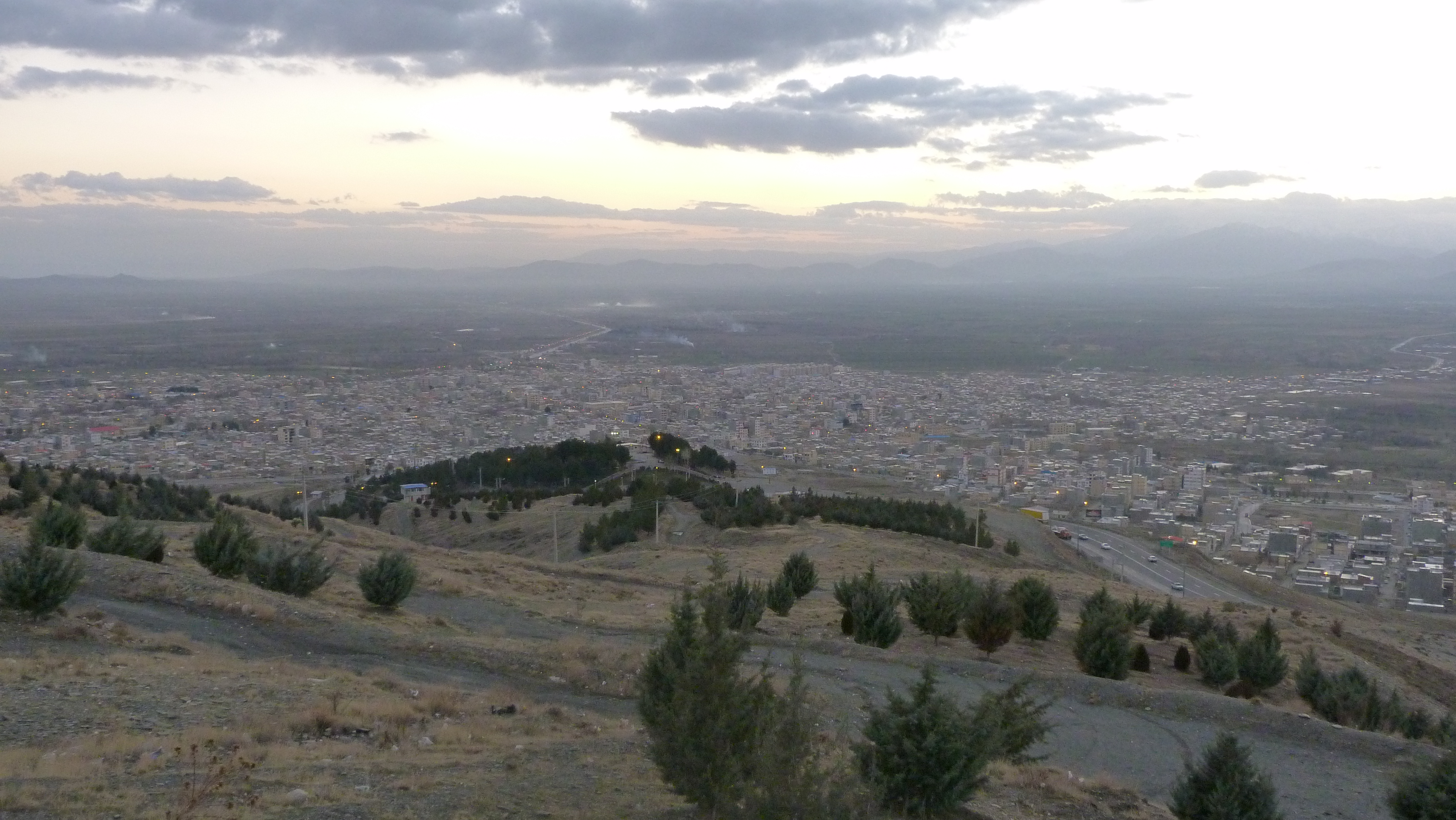
- The city of Asadabad

- Location of Asadabad County in Hamadan province (left, purple)

- Location of Hamadan province in Iran
- Coordinates: 34°48′N 48°04′E
- Country: Iran
- Province: Hamadan
- Established: 1990
- Capital: Asadabad
- Districts: Central, Pirsalman

Population (2016)
  - Total: 100,901
- Time zone: UTC+3:30 (IRST)

Asadabad County (Persian: شهرستان اسدآباد) is in Hamadan province, Iran. Its capital is the city of Asadabad.

== History ==
In 2009, Kolyai and Pirsalman Rural Districts were separated from the Central District in the formation of Pirsalman District. The village of Ajin was converted to a city in 2011. The village of Jannatabad was converted to a city and renamed Paliz in 2020.

== Demographics ==
=== Population ===
At the time of the 2006 National Census, the county's population was 104,566 in 25,167 households. The following census in 2011 counted 107,006 people in 29,232 households. The 2016 census measured the population of the county as 100,901 in 30,387 households.

=== Administrative divisions ===
Asadabad County's population history and administrative structure over three consecutive censuses are shown in the following table.

Asadabad County Population
| Administrative Divisions | 2006 | 2011 | 2016 |
|---|---|---|---|
| Central District | 104,566 | 93,789 | 89,774 |
| Chaharduli RD | 9,367 | 9,291 | 8,003 |
| Darbandrud RD | 13,054 | 12,952 | 11,413 |
| Jolgeh RD | 6,669 | 3,722 | 3,138 |
| Kolyai RD | 3,909 | | |
| Pirsalman RD | 6,835 | | |
| Seyyed Jamal ol Din RD | 13,428 | 12,800 | 11,517 |
| Asadabad (city) | 51,304 | 55,024 | 55,703 |
| Paliz (city) (Note: Formerly the village of Jannatabad; became a city after the 2016 census) | | | |
| Pirsalman District | | 12,739 | 10,825 |
| Kolyai RD | | 3,354 | 3,028 |
| Pirsalman RD | | 9,385 | 5,059 |
| Ajin (city) | | | 2,738 |
| Total | 104,566 | 107,006 | 100,901 |
RD = Rural District

== See also ==
Media related to Asadabad County at Wikimedia Commons
