= Nasir Kandi =

Nasir Kandi or Nasirkandi (Persian: نصيركندي) may refer to:

- Nasir Kandi, Arshaq, Ardabil Province
- Nasir Kandi, Moradlu, Ardabil Province
- Nasir Kandi, Charuymaq, East Azerbaijan Province
- Nasir Kandi, Maragheh, East Azerbaijan Province
- Nasir Kandi, West Azerbaijan
