= Arshaq =

Arshaq (Persian: ارشق) may refer to:

- Arshaq District
- Arshaq-e Gharbi Rural District
- Arshaq-e Markazi Rural District
- Arshaq-e Sharqi Rural District
- Arshaq-e Shomali Rural District
