= Mollalu =

Mollalu (Persian: ملالو) may refer to:

- Mollalu, Germi, Ardabil Province
- Mollalu, Meshgin Shahr, Ardabil Province
- Mollalu, Ahar, East Azerbaijan Province
- Mollalu, Kaleybar, East Azerbaijan Province
