= Sheykh Mohammad =

Sheykh Mohammad or Shaikh Muhammad (Persian: شيخ محمد) may refer to:

- Sheykh Mohammad, Ardabil
- Sheykh Mohammad, Fars
- Sheykh Mohammad, Khuzestan
- Sheykh Mohammad, Ahvaz, Khuzestan Province
