= Yusefkhan Kandi =

Village in Ardabil province, Iran

Yusefkhan Kandi Persian: يوسف خان كندي
- Village
- Location within Iran
- Coordinates: 38°36′36″N 47°40′30″E
- Country: Iran
- Province: Ardabil
- County: Meshgin Shahr
- District: Moradlu
- Rural District: Arshaq-e Gharbi

Population (2016)
  - Total: 82
- Time zone: UTC+3:30 (IRST)

Yusefkhan Kandi (Persian: يوسف خان كندي) (Note: Also romanized as Yūsefkhān Kandī; also known as Yūsef Kandī) is a village in Arshaq-e Gharbi Rural District of Moradlu District in Meshgin Shahr County, Ardabil province, Iran.

== Demographics ==
=== Population ===
At the time of the 2006 National Census, the village's population was 124 in 33 households. The following census in 2011 counted 99 people in 26 households. The 2016 census measured the population of the village as 82 people in 23 households.
