= Alachiq Tappehsi =

Village in Ardabil province, Iran

Alachiq Tappehsi Persian: الاچيق تپه سي
- Village
- Location within Iran
- Coordinates: 38°40′13″N 47°42′4″E
- Country: Iran
- Province: Ardabil
- County: Meshgin Shahr
- District: Moradlu
- Rural District: Arshaq-e Gharbi

Population (2016)
  - Total: 37
- Time zone: UTC+3:30 (IRST)

Alachiq Tappehsi (Persian: الاچيق تپه سي) (Note: Also romanized as Alachiq Tapahsi and Alāchīq Tapahsī) is a village in Arshaq-e Gharbi Rural District of Moradlu District in Meshgin Shahr County, Ardabil province, Iran.

== Demographics ==
=== Population ===
At the time of the 2006 National Census, the village's population was 107 in 16 households. The following census in 2011 counted 53 people in 11 households. The 2016 census measured the population of the village as 37 people in nine households.
