= Qari Mazraehsi =

Village in Ardabil province, Iran

Qari Mazraehsi Persian: قاري مزرعه سي
- Village
- Location within Iran
- Coordinates: 38°46′29″N 47°46′45″E
- Country: Iran
- Province: Ardabil
- County: Meshgin Shahr
- District: Moradlu
- Rural District: Arshaq-e Gharbi

Population (2016)
  - Total: 67
- Time zone: UTC+3:30 (IRST)

Qari Mazraehsi (Persian: قاري مزرعه سي) (Note: Also romanized as Qārī Mazra‘ehsī; also known as Qārī Mazra‘ahsī) is a village in Arshaq-e Gharbi Rural District of Moradlu District in Meshgin Shahr County, Ardabil province, Iran.

== Demographics ==
=== Population ===
At the time of the 2006 National Census, the village's population was 122 in 23 households. The following census in 2011 counted 75 people in 20 households. The 2016 census measured the population of the village as 67 people in 20 households.
