= Mohamandust-e Olya, Meshgin Shahr =

Village in Ardabil province, Iran

Mohamandust-e Olya Persian: مهماندوست عليا
- Village
- Location within Iran
- Country: Iran
- Province: Ardabil
- County: Meshgin Shahr
- District: Moradlu
- Rural District: Arshaq-e Gharbi

Population (2016)
  - Total: 199
- Time zone: UTC+3:30 (IRST)

Mohamandust-e Olya (Persian: مهماندوست عليا) (Note: Also romanized as Mohamāndūst-e ‘Olyā) is a village in Arshaq-e Gharbi Rural District of Moradlu District in Meshgin Shahr County, Ardabil province, Iran.

== Demographics ==
=== Population ===
At the time of the 2006 National Census, the village's population was 282 in 58 households. The following census in 2011 counted 239 people in 67 households. The 2016 census measured the population of the village as 199 people in 57 households.
