= Abbasali Kandi =

Village in Ardabil province, Iran

Abbasali Kandi Persian: عباسعلي كندي
- Village
- Location within Iran
- Coordinates: 38°48′15″N 47°43′56″E
- Country: Iran
- Province: Ardabil
- County: Meshgin Shahr
- District: Moradlu
- Rural District: Salavat

Population (2016)
  - Total: 32
- Time zone: UTC+3:30 (IRST)

Abbasali Kandi (Persian: عباسعلي كندي) (Note: Also romanized as ‘Abbās‘alī Kandī) is a village in Salavat Rural District of Moradlu District in Meshgin Shahr County, Ardabil province, Iran.

== Demographics ==
=== Population ===
At the time of the 2006 National Census, the village's population was 32 in eight households. The following census in 2011 counted 41 people in 10 households. The 2016 census measured the population of the village as 32 people in nine households.
