= Incheh, Meshgin Shahr =

Village in Ardabil province, Iran

Incheh Persian: اينچه
- Village
- Location within Iran
- Coordinates: 38°38′49″N 47°46′51″E
- Country: Iran
- Province: Ardabil
- County: Meshgin Shahr
- District: Moradlu
- Rural District: Arshaq-e Gharbi

Population (2016)
  - Total: Below reporting threshold
- Time zone: UTC+3:30 (IRST)

Incheh (Persian: اينچه) (Note: Also romanized as Īncheh; also known as Īmcheh) is a village in Arshaq-e Gharbi Rural District of Moradlu District in Meshgin Shahr County, Ardabil province, Iran.

== Demographics ==
=== Population ===
At the time of the 2006 National Census, the village's population was 25 in six households. The following census in 2011 counted 15 people in four households. The 2016 census measured the population of the village as below the reporting threshold.
