= At Tutan =

Village in Ardabil province, Iran

At Tutan Persian: ات توتان
- Village
- Location within Iran
- Coordinates: 38°39′50″N 48°14′24″E
- Country: Iran
- Province: Ardabil
- County: Meshgin Shahr
- District: Arshaq
- Rural District: Arshaq-e Markazi

Population (2016)
  - Total: 25
- Time zone: UTC+3:30 (IRST)

At Tutan (Persian: ات توتان) (Note: Also romanized as Āt Tūtān) is a village in Arshaq-e Markazi Rural District of Arshaq District in Meshgin Shahr County, Ardabil province, Iran.

== Demographics ==
=== Population ===
At the time of the 2006 National Census, the village's population was 15 in six households. The following census in 2011 counted 24 people in seven households. The 2016 census measured the population of the village as 25 people in nine households.
