= Asadabad, Ardabil =

Village in Ardabil province, Iran

Asadabad Persian: اسداباد
- Village
- Location within Iran
- Coordinates: 38°47′20″N 47°58′00″E
- Country: Iran
- Province: Ardabil
- County: Meshgin Shahr
- District: Arshaq
- Rural District: Arshaq-e Markazi

Population (2016)
  - Total: 85
- Time zone: UTC+3:30 (IRST)

Asadabad (Persian: اسداباد) (Note: Also romanized as Asādābād; also known as Azādābād and Qomchi Qayehsi (قمچی قیه‌سی)) is a village in Arshaq-e Markazi Rural District of Arshaq District in Meshgin Shahr County, Ardabil province, Iran.

== Demographics ==
=== Population ===
At the time of the 2006 National Census, the village's population was 93 in 16 households. The following census in 2011 counted 70 people in 18 households. The 2016 census measured the population of the village as 85 people in 28 households.
