= Dash Bolaq Kandi =

Village in Ardabil province, Iran

Dash Bolaq Kandi Persian: داشبلاق كندي
- Village
- Location within Iran
- Coordinates: 38°50′46″N 47°39′18″E
- Country: Iran
- Province: Ardabil
- County: Meshgin Shahr
- District: Moradlu
- Rural District: Salavat

Population (2016)
  - Total: 149
- Time zone: UTC+3:30 (IRST)

Dash Bolaq Kandi (Persian: داشبلاق كندي) (Note: Also romanized as Dāsh Bolāq Kandī; also known as Dāsh Bolāgh Kandeh) is a village in Salavat Rural District of Moradlu District in Meshgin Shahr County, Ardabil province, Iran.

== Demographics ==
=== Population ===
At the time of the 2006 National Census, the village's population was 209 in 45 households. The following census in 2011 counted 182 people in 48 households. The 2016 census measured the population of the village as 149 people in 35 households.
