= Balut Kandi =

Village in Ardabil province, Iran

Balut Kandi Persian: بلوطكندي
- Village
- Location within Iran
- Coordinates: 38°39′48″N 48°02′37″E
- Country: Iran
- Province: Ardabil
- County: Meshgin Shahr
- District: Arshaq
- Rural District: Arshaq-e Markazi

Population (2016)
  - Total: 19
- Time zone: UTC+3:30 (IRST)

Balut Kandi (Persian: بلوطكندي) (Note: Also romanized as Balūt Kandī and Balūţ Kandī) is a village in Arshaq-e Markazi Rural District of Arshaq District in Meshgin Shahr County, Ardabil province, Iran.

== Demographics ==
=== Population ===
At the time of the 2006 National Census, the village's population was 25 in four households. The following census in 2011 counted 20 people in five households. The 2016 census measured the population of the village as 19 people in five households.
