= Khanom Alilu =

Village in Ardabil province, Iran

Khanom Alilu Persian: خانم عليلو
- Village
- Location within Iran
- Coordinates: 38°44′14″N 47°47′10″E
- Country: Iran
- Province: Ardabil
- County: Meshgin Shahr
- District: Moradlu
- Rural District: Arshaq-e Gharbi

Population (2016)
  - Total: 41
- Time zone: UTC+3:30 (IRST)

Khanom Alilu (Persian: خانم عليلو) (Note: Also romanized as Khānom ʿAlīlū; also known as Khānomānlū) is a village in Arshaq-e Gharbi Rural District of Moradlu District in Meshgin Shahr County, Ardabil province, Iran.

== Demographics ==
=== Population ===
At the time of the 2006 National Census, the village's population was 50 in 11 households. The following census in 2011 counted 26 people in seven households. The 2016 census measured the population of the village as 41 people in 12 households.
