= Mir Jafarlu =

Village in Ardabil province, Iran

Mir Jafarlu Persian: ميرجعفرلو
- Village
- Location within Iran
- Coordinates: 38°52′09″N 47°43′31″E
- Country: Iran
- Province: Ardabil
- County: Meshgin Shahr
- District: Moradlu
- Rural District: Salavat

Population (2016)
  - Total: 74
- Time zone: UTC+3:30 (IRST)

Mir Jafarlu (Persian: ميرجعفرلو) (Note: Also romanized as Mīr Ja‘farlū; also known as Mashhadī Ja‘far) is a village in Salavat Rural District of Moradlu District in Meshgin Shahr County, Ardabil province, Iran.

== Demographics ==
=== Population ===
At the time of the 2006 National Census, the village's population was 111 in 28 households. The following census in 2011 counted 92 people in 28 households. The 2016 census measured the population of the village as 74 people in 23 households.
