= Alikaran =

Village in Ardabil province, Iran

Alikaran Persian: علي كران
- Village
- Location within Iran
- Coordinates: 38°44′37″N 48°08′18″E
- Country: Iran
- Province: Ardabil
- County: Meshgin Shahr
- District: Arshaq
- Rural District: Arshaq-e Markazi

Population (2016)
  - Total: 138
- Time zone: UTC+3:30 (IRST)

Alikaran (Persian: علي كران) (Note: Also romanized as ‘Alīkarān) is a village in Arshaq-e Markazi Rural District of Arshaq District in Meshgin Shahr County, Ardabil province, Iran.

== Demographics ==
=== Population ===
At the time of the 2006 National Census, the village's population was 73 in 15 households. The following census in 2011 counted 55 people in 12 households. The 2016 census measured the population of the village as 138 people in 48 households.
