= Salavat, Iran =

Village in Ardabil province, Iran

Salavat Persian: صلوات
- Village
- Location within Iran
- Coordinates: 38°49′34″N 47°44′29″E
- Country: Iran
- Province: Ardabil
- County: Meshgin Shahr
- District: Moradlu
- Rural District: Salavat

Population (2016)
  - Total: 694
- Time zone: UTC+3:30 (IRST)

Salavat (Persian: صلوات) (Note: Also romanized as Şalavāt; also known as Masjed Şalavāt) is a village in, and the capital of, Salavat Rural District in Moradlu District of Meshgin Shahr County, Ardabil province, Iran.

== Demographics ==
=== Population ===
At the time of the 2006 National Census, the village's population was 970 in 200 households. The following census in 2011 counted 674 people in 171 households. The 2016 census measured the population of the village as 694 people in 210 households. It was the most populous village in its rural district.
