= Goli Daraq =

Goli Daraq (Persian: گلي درق), also rendered as Gol Daraq or Goli Darreh, may refer to:

- Goli Daraq-e Olya
- Goli Daraq-e Sofla
