= Qasem Kandi =

Qasem Kandi (Persian: قاسم كندي) may refer to:

- Qasem Kandi, Germi, Ardabil Province
- Qasem Kandi, Meshgin Shahr, Ardabil Province
- Qasem Kandi, East Azerbaijan
