= Chakhmaq Chukhur =

Village in Ardabil province, Iran

Chakhmaq Chukhur Persian: چاخماق چوخور
- Village
- Location within Iran
- Coordinates: 38°37′24″N 47°46′12″E
- Country: Iran
- Province: Ardabil
- County: Meshgin Shahr
- District: Moradlu
- Rural District: Arshaq-e Gharbi

Population (2016)
  - Total: 31
- Time zone: UTC+3:30 (IRST)

Chakhmaq Chukhur (Persian: چاخماق چوخور) (Note: Also romanized as Chakhmāq Chūkhūr; also known as Chakhmāq Chokūr) is a village in Arshaq-e Gharbi Rural District of Moradlu District in Meshgin Shahr County, Ardabil province, Iran.

== Demographics ==
=== Population ===
At the time of the 2006 National Census, the village's population was 54 in 14 households. The following census in 2011 counted 45 people in 12 households. The 2016 census measured the population of the village as 31 people in 10 households.
