= Qeshlaq-e Ali Shansuyi =

Village in Ardabil province, Iran

Qeshlaq-e Ali Shansuyi Persian: قشلاق علي شان سوئي
- Village
- Location within Iran
- Country: Iran
- Province: Ardabil
- County: Meshgin Shahr
- District: Arshaq
- Rural District: Arshaq-e Markazi

Population (2016)
  - Total: 15
- Time zone: UTC+3:30 (IRST)

Qeshlaq-e Ali Shansuyi (Persian: قشلاق علي شان سوئي) (Note: Also romanized as Qeshlāq-e ʿAlī Shānsūyī) is a village in Arshaq-e Markazi Rural District of Arshaq District in Meshgin Shahr County, Ardabil province, Iran.

== Demographics ==
=== Population ===
At the time of the 2006 National Census, the village's population was 20 in five households. The following census in 2011 counted 26 people in seven households. The 2016 census measured the population of the village as 15 people in five households.
