= Quldur Kohli =

Village in Ardabil province, Iran

Quldur Kohli Persian: قولدوركهلي
- Village
- Location within Iran
- Coordinates: 38°39′26″N 47°39′47″E
- Country: Iran
- Province: Ardabil
- County: Meshgin Shahr
- District: Moradlu
- Rural District: Arshaq-e Gharbi

Population (2016)
  - Total: 222
- Time zone: UTC+3:30 (IRST)

Quldur Kohli (Persian: قولدوركهلي) (Note: Also romanized as Qūldūr Kohlī; also known as Qoldor Kohlī) is a village in Arshaq-e Gharbi Rural District of Moradlu District in Meshgin Shahr County, Ardabil province, Iran.

== Demographics ==
=== Population ===
At the time of the 2006 National Census, the village's population was 231 in 43 households. The following census in 2011 counted 232 people in 59 households. The 2016 census measured the population of the village as 222 people in 67 households.
