= Talkan =

Village in Ardabil province, Iran

Talkan Persian: تلكان
- Village
- Country: Iran
- Province: Ardabil
- County: Meshgin Shahr
- District: Moradlu
- Rural District: Arshaq-e Gharbi

Population (2016)
  - Total: 30
- Time zone: UTC+3:30 (IRST)

Talkan (Persian: تلكان) (Note: Also romanized as Talkān) is a village in Arshaq-e Gharbi Rural District of Moradlu District in Meshgin Shahr County, Ardabil province, Iran.

== Demographics ==
=== Population ===
At the time of the 2006 National Census, the village's population was 26 in four households. The following census in 2011 counted 35 people in eight households. The 2016 census measured the population of the village as 30 people in six households.
