= Ali Shansuyi =

Village in Ardabil province, Iran

Ali Shansuyi Persian: عليشان سويي
- Village
- Location within Iran
- Coordinates: 38°46′50″N 48°00′21″E
- Country: Iran
- Province: Ardabil
- County: Meshgin Shahr
- District: Arshaq
- Rural District: Arshaq-e Markazi

Population (2016)
  - Total: 34
- Time zone: UTC+3:30 (IRST)

Ali Shansuyi (Persian: عليشان سويي) (Note: Also romanized as ‘Alī Shānsūyī; also known as ‘Alī Shānslū’ī and ‘Alī Shānslū’ī-ye Bālā) is a village in Arshaq-e Markazi Rural District of Arshaq District in Meshgin Shahr County, Ardabil province, Iran.

== Demographics ==
=== Population ===
At the time of the 2006 National Census, the village's population was 41 in 11 households. The following census in 2011 counted 32 people in nine households. The 2016 census measured the population of the village as 34 people in 12 households.
