= Dashli Daraq =

Village in Ardabil province, Iran

Dashli Daraq Persian: داشلي درق
- Village
- Location within Iran
- Coordinates: 38°47′03″N 47°42′14″E
- Country: Iran
- Province: Ardabil
- County: Meshgin Shahr
- District: Moradlu
- Rural District: Salavat

Population (2016)
  - Total: 26
- Time zone: UTC+3:30 (IRST)

Dashli Daraq (Persian: داشلي درق) (Note: Also romanized as Dāshlī Daraq; also known as Dāshlī Darreh and Dāshtan Darreh) is a village in Salavat Rural District of Moradlu District in Meshgin Shahr County, Ardabil province, Iran.

== Demographics ==
=== Population ===
At the time of the 2006 National Census, the village's population was 23 in six households. The following census in 2011 counted 24 people in seven households. The 2016 census measured the population of the village as 26 people in seven households.
