= Guni Kandi =

Village in Ardabil province, Iran

Guni Kandi Persian: گوني كندي
- Village
- Location within Iran
- Country: Iran
- Province: Ardabil
- County: Meshgin Shahr
- District: Moradlu
- Rural District: Arshaq-e Gharbi

Population (2016)
  - Total: 50
- Time zone: UTC+3:30 (IRST)

Guni Kandi (Persian: گوني كندي) (Note: Also romanized as Gūney Kandī and Gūnī Kandī) is a village in Arshaq-e Gharbi Rural District of Moradlu District in Meshgin Shahr County, Ardabil province, Iran.

== Demographics ==
=== Population ===
At the time of the 2006 National Census, the village's population was 59 in 12 households. The following census in 2011 counted 48 people in nine households. The 2016 census measured the population of the village as 50 people in 10 households.
