= Chebenlu =

Village in Ardabil province, Iran

Chebenlu Persian: چبنلو
- Village
- Location within Iran
- Coordinates: 38°33′31″N 48°04′12″E
- Country: Iran
- Province: Ardabil
- County: Meshgin Shahr
- District: Arshaq
- Rural District: Arshaq-e Markazi

Population (2016)
  - Total: 79
- Time zone: UTC+3:30 (IRST)

Chebenlu (Persian: چبنلو) (Note: Also romanized as Chebenlū; also known as Chebenī) is a village in Arshaq-e Markazi Rural District of Arshaq District in Meshgin Shahr County, Ardabil province, Iran.

== Demographics ==
=== Population ===
At the time of the 2006 National Census, the village's population was 81 in 16 households. The following census in 2011 counted 58 people in 13 households. The 2016 census measured the population of the village as 79 people in 27 households.
