= Agh Davahlu-ye Olya =

Village in Ardabil province, Iran

Agh Davahlu-ye Olya Persian: اغ دوه لوعليا
- Village
- Location within Iran
- Coordinates: 38°41′30″N 48°10′56″E
- Country: Iran
- Province: Ardabil
- County: Meshgin Shahr
- District: Arshaq
- Rural District: Arshaq-e Markazi

Population (2016)
  - Total: 27
- Time zone: UTC+3:30 (IRST)

Agh Davahlu-ye Olya (Persian: اغ دوه لوعليا) (Note: Also romanized as Āgh Davahlū-ye ‘Olyā; also known as Āq Davahlū-ye Bālā and Āq Davallū-ye Bālā) is a village in Arshaq-e Markazi Rural District of Arshaq District in Meshgin Shahr County, Ardabil province, Iran.

== Demographics ==
=== Population ===
At the time of the 2006 National Census, the village's population was 69 in 16 households. The following census in 2011 counted 46 people in 14 households. The 2016 census measured the population of the village as 27 people in eight households.
