= Hoseyn Khan Kandi =

Village in Ardabil province, Iran

Hoseyn Khan Kandi Persian: حسين خان كندي
- Village
- Location within Iran
- Coordinates: 38°39′33″N 48°01′58″E
- Country: Iran
- Province: Ardabil
- County: Meshgin Shahr
- District: Arshaq
- Rural District: Arshaq-e Markazi

Population (2016)
  - Total: Below reporting threshold
- Time zone: UTC+3:30 (IRST)

Hoseyn Khan Kandi (Persian: حسين خان كندي) (Note: Also romanized as Ḩoseyn Khān Kandī) is a village in Arshaq-e Markazi Rural District of Arshaq District in Meshgin Shahr County, Ardabil province, Iran.

== Demographics ==
=== Population ===
At the time of the 2006 National Census, the village's population was 20 in five households. The village did not appear in the following census of 2011. The 2016 census measured the population of the village as zero.
