= Khani Babalu =

Village in Ardabil province, Iran

Khani Babalu Persian: خان ببلو
- Village
- Location within Iran
- Coordinates: 38°42′31″N 47°52′57″E
- Country: Iran
- Province: Ardabil
- County: Meshgin Shahr
- District: Moradlu
- Rural District: Arshaq-e Gharbi

Population (2016)
  - Total: 81
- Time zone: UTC+3:30 (IRST)

Khani Babalu (Persian: خان ببلو) (Note: Also romanized as Khānī Babalū; also known as Khānī Babahlū) is a village in Arshaq-e Gharbi Rural District of Moradlu District in Meshgin Shahr County, Ardabil province, Iran.

== Demographics ==
=== Population ===
At the time of the 2006 National Census, the village's population was 63 in 15 households. The following census in 2011 counted 58 people in 16 households. The 2016 census measured the population of the village as 81 people in 26 households.
