= Genlujeh =

Village in Ardabil province, Iran

Genlujeh Persian: گنلوجه
- Village
- Location within Iran
- Coordinates: 38°37′08″N 47°45′28″E
- Country: Iran
- Province: Ardabil
- County: Meshgin Shahr
- District: Moradlu
- Rural District: Arshaq-e Gharbi

Population (2016)
  - Total: 226
- Time zone: UTC+3:30 (IRST)

Genlujeh (Persian: گنلوجه) (Note: Also romanized as Genlūjeh; also known as Gand Lūjeh and Ganeh Lūjeh) is a village in Arshaq-e Gharbi Rural District of Moradlu District in Meshgin Shahr County, Ardabil province, Iran.

== Demographics ==
=== Population ===
At the time of the 2006 National Census, the village's population was 257 in 56 households. The following census in 2011 counted 231 people in 58 households. The 2016 census measured the population of the village as 226 people in 67 households.
