= Emaratlui-ye Olya =

Village in Ardabil province, Iran

Emaratlui-ye Olya Persian: عمارتلوي عليا
- Village
- Location within Iran
- Coordinates: 38°46′25″N 47°50′52″E
- Country: Iran
- Province: Ardabil
- County: Meshgin Shahr
- District: Moradlu
- Rural District: Arshaq-e Gharbi

Population (2016)
  - Total: 20
- Time zone: UTC+3:30 (IRST)

Emaratlui-ye Olya (Persian: عمارتلوي عليا) (Note: Also romanized as ‘Emāratlūī-ye ‘Olyā; also known as ‘Emāratlū) is a village in Arshaq-e Gharbi Rural District of Moradlu District in Meshgin Shahr County, Ardabil province, Iran.

== Demographics ==
=== Population ===
At the time of the 2006 National Census, the village's population was 36 in 10 households. The following census in 2011 counted 19 people in eight households. The 2016 census measured the population of the village as 20 people in eight households.
