= Dam Qoli =

Village in Ardabil province, Iran

Dam Qoli Persian: دمقلي
- Village
- Location within Iran
- Coordinates: 38°33′06″N 48°00′17″E
- Country: Iran
- Province: Ardabil
- County: Meshgin Shahr
- District: Arshaq
- Rural District: Arshaq-e Markazi

Population (2016)
  - Total: 242
- Time zone: UTC+3:30 (IRST)

Dam Qoli (Persian: دمقلي) (Note: Also romanized as Dam Qolī; also known as Karam Qolī) is a village in Arshaq-e Markazi Rural District of Arshaq District in Meshgin Shahr County, Ardabil province, Iran.

== Demographics ==
=== Population ===
At the time of the 2006 National Census, the village's population was 154 in 25 households. The following census in 2011 counted 134 people in 30 households. The 2016 census measured the population of the village as 242 people in 65 households.
