= Qarah Aghaj Poshteh =

Village in Ardabil province, Iran

Qarah Aghaj Poshteh Persian: قره اغاج پشته
- Village
- Location within Iran
- Coordinates: 38°41′18″N 47°37′48″E
- Country: Iran
- Province: Ardabil
- County: Meshgin Shahr
- District: Moradlu
- Rural District: Yaft

Population (2016)
  - Total: 299
- Time zone: UTC+3:30 (IRST)

Qarah Aghaj Poshteh (Persian: قره اغاج پشته) (Note: Also romanized as Qarah Āghāj Poshteh; also known as Poshteh-ye Qareh Āghāj) is a village in Yaft Rural District of Moradlu District in Meshgin Shahr County, Ardabil province, Iran.

== Demographics ==
=== Population ===
At the time of the 2006 National Census, the village's population was 445 in 103 households. The following census in 2011 counted 319 people in 83 households. The 2016 census measured the population of the village as 299 people in 84 households.
