= Hasanlu, Ardabil =

Village in Ardabil province, Iran

Hasanlu Persian: حسنلو
- Village
- Location within Iran
- Coordinates: 38°36′50″N 48°00′50″E
- Country: Iran
- Province: Ardabil
- County: Meshgin Shahr
- District: Arshaq
- Rural District: Arshaq-e Markazi

Population (2016)
  - Total: 126
- Time zone: UTC+3:30 (IRST)

Hasanlu (Persian: حسنلو) (Note: Also romanized as Ḩasanlū) is a village in Arshaq-e Markazi Rural District of Arshaq District in Meshgin Shahr County, Ardabil province, Iran.

== Demographics ==
=== Population ===
At the time of the 2006 National Census, the village's population was 119 in 27 households. The following census in 2011 counted 116 people in 27 households. The 2016 census measured the population of the village as 126 people in 38 households.
