= Ojaq Qoli Kandi =

Village in Ardabil province, Iran

Ojaq Qoli Kandi Persian: اوجاق قلي كندي
- Village
- Location within Iran
- Coordinates: 38°46′48″N 47°50′00″E
- Country: Iran
- Province: Ardabil
- County: Meshgin Shahr
- District: Moradlu
- Rural District: Arshaq-e Gharbi

Population (2016)
  - Total: Below reporting threshold
- Time zone: UTC+3:30 (IRST)

Ojaq Qoli Kandi (Persian: اوجاق قلي كندي) (Note: Also romanized as Ojāq Qolī Kandī; also known as Ojāq Qolī) is a village in Arshaq-e Gharbi Rural District of Moradlu District in Meshgin Shahr County, Ardabil province, Iran.

== Demographics ==
=== Population ===
At the time of the 2006 National Census, the village's population was 23 in five households. The following census in 2011 counted a population below the reporting threshold. The 2016 census again measured the population of the village as below the reporting threshold.
