= Tazeh Kand, Meshgin Shahr =

Village in Ardabil province, Iran

Tazeh Kand Persian: تازه كند
- Village
- Location within Iran
- Coordinates: 38.6719°N 47.7579°E
- Country: Iran
- Province: Ardabil
- County: Meshgin Shahr
- District: Moradlu
- Rural District: Arshaq-e Gharbi

Population (2016)
  - Total: 368
- Time zone: UTC+3:30 (IRST)

Tazeh Kand (Persian: تازه كند) (Note: Also romanized as Tāzeh Kand; also known as Tāzeh Kand-e Arshaq) is a village in Arshaq-e Gharbi Rural District of Moradlu District in Meshgin Shahr County, Ardabil province, Iran.

== Demographics ==
=== Population ===
At the time of the 2006 National Census, the village's population was 349 in 87 households. The following census in 2011 counted 318 people in 86 households. The 2016 census measured the population of the village as 368 people in 119 households.
