= Kandeh Kandi =

Village in Ardabil province, Iran

Kandeh Kandi Persian: كنده كندي
- Village
- Location within Iran
- Coordinates: 38°51′49″N 47°40′30″E
- Country: Iran
- Province: Ardabil
- County: Meshgin Shahr
- District: Moradlu
- Rural District: Salavat

Population (2016)
  - Total: 342
- Time zone: UTC+3:30 (IRST)

Kandeh Kandi (Persian: كنده كندي) (Note: Also romanized as Kandeh Kandī; also known as Kandeh) is a village in Salavat Rural District of Moradlu District in Meshgin Shahr County, Ardabil province, Iran.

== Demographics ==
=== Population ===
At the time of the 2006 National Census, the village's population was 459 in 94 households. The following census in 2011 counted 365 people in 76 households. The 2016 census measured the population of the village as 342 people in 89 households.
