= Qarah Valilu =

Village in Ardabil province, Iran

Qarah Valilu Persian: قره ولي لو
- Village
- Location within Iran
- Coordinates: 38°48′33″N 47°53′28″E
- Country: Iran
- Province: Ardabil
- County: Meshgin Shahr
- District: Moradlu
- Rural District: Arshaq-e Gharbi

Population (2016)
  - Total: 59
- Time zone: UTC+3:30 (IRST)

Qarah Valilu (Persian: قره ولي لو) (Note: Also romanized as Qarah Valīlū) is a village in Arshaq-e Gharbi Rural District of Moradlu District in Meshgin Shahr County, Ardabil province, Iran.

== Demographics ==
=== Population ===
At the time of the 2006 National Census, the village's population was 101 in 21 households. The following census in 2011 counted 75 people in 19 households. The 2016 census measured the population of the village as 59 people in 19 households.
