= Sobhanlu =

Village in Ardabil province, Iran

Sobhanlu Persian: صبحان لو
- Village
- Location within Iran
- Coordinates: 38°46′43″N 48°02′46″E
- Country: Iran
- Province: Ardabil
- County: Meshgin Shahr
- District: Arshaq
- Rural District: Arshaq-e Markazi

Population (2016)
  - Total: 10
- Time zone: UTC+3:30 (IRST)

Sobhanlu (Persian: صبحان لو) (Note: Also romanized as Sobḩānlū) is a village in Arshaq-e Markazi Rural District of Arshaq District in Meshgin Shahr County, Ardabil province, Iran.

== Demographics ==
=== Population ===
At the time of the 2006 National Census, the village's population was 30 in six households. The following census in 2011 counted 11 people in four households. The 2016 census measured the population of the village as 10 people in four households.
