= Pir Alilu =

Village in Ardabil province, Iran

Pir Alilu Persian: پيرعليلو
- Village
- Location within Iran
- Coordinates: 38°40′15″N 48°07′34″E
- Country: Iran
- Province: Ardabil
- County: Meshgin Shahr
- District: Arshaq
- Rural District: Arshaq-e Markazi

Population (2016)
  - Total: 22
- Time zone: UTC+3:30 (IRST)

Pir Alilu (Persian: پيرعليلو) (Note: Also romanized as Pīr ‘Alīlū; also known as Pīr ‘Alī) is a village in Arshaq-e Markazi Rural District of Arshaq District in Meshgin Shahr County, Ardabil province, Iran.

== Demographics ==
=== Population ===
At the time of the 2006 National Census, the village's population was 68 in 16 households. The following census in 2011 counted 44 people in 12 households. The 2016 census measured the population of the village as 22 people in eight households.
