= Sardi, Ardabil =

Village in Ardabil province, Iran

Sardi Persian: سردي
- Village
- Location within Iran
- Coordinates: 38°47′57″N 47°41′07″E
- Country: Iran
- Province: Ardabil
- County: Meshgin Shahr
- District: Moradlu
- Rural District: Salavat

Population (2016)
  - Total: 55
- Time zone: UTC+3:30 (IRST)

Sardi (Persian: سردي) (Note: Also romanized as Sardī; also known as Sarī) is a village in Salavat Rural District of Moradlu District in Meshgin Shahr County, Ardabil province, Iran.

== Demographics ==
=== Population ===
At the time of the 2006 National Census, the village's population was 57 in 12 households. The following census in 2011 counted 50 people in 14 households. The 2016 census measured the population of the village as 55 people in 19 households.
