= Tarhamabad =

Village in Ardabil province, Iran

Tarhamabad Persian: ترحم اباد
- Village
- Location within Iran
- Country: Iran
- Province: Ardabil
- County: Meshgin Shahr
- District: Arshaq
- Rural District: Arshaq-e Markazi

Population (2016)
  - Total: 17
- Time zone: UTC+3:30 (IRST)

Tarhamabad (Persian: ترحم اباد) (Note: Also romanized as Tarḩamābād; also known as Tarḩam) is a village in Arshaq-e Markazi Rural District of Arshaq District in Meshgin Shahr County, Ardabil province, Iran.

== Demographics ==
=== Population ===
At the time of the 2006 National Census, the village's population was 26 in eight households. The following census in 2011 counted 18 people in five households. The 2016 census measured the population of the village as 17 people in eight households.
