= Mashiran =

Village in Ardabil province, Iran

Mashiran Persian: مشيران
- Village
- Location within Iran
- Coordinates: 38°40′51″N 47°32′27″E
- Country: Iran
- Province: Ardabil
- County: Meshgin Shahr
- District: Moradlu
- Rural District: Yaft

Population (2016)
  - Total: 815
- Time zone: UTC+3:30 (IRST)

Mashiran (Persian: مشيران) (Note: Also romanized as Mashīrān and Moshīrān) is a village in Yaft Rural District of Moradlu District in Meshgin Shahr County, Ardabil province, Iran.

== Demographics ==
=== Population ===
At the time of the 2006 National Census, the village's population was 929 in 199 households. The following census in 2011 counted 804 people in 209 households. The 2016 census measured the population of the village as 815 people in 235 households, the most populous in its rural district.
