= Aqa Morad =

Village in Ardabil province, Iran

Aqa Morad Persian: اقامراد
- Village
- Location within Iran
- Coordinates: 38°32′10″N 47°58′09″E
- Country: Iran
- Province: Ardabil
- County: Meshgin Shahr
- District: Arshaq
- Rural District: Arshaq-e Markazi

Population (2016)
  - Total: 50
- Time zone: UTC+3:30 (IRST)

Aqa Morad (Persian: اقامراد) (Note: Also romanized as Āqā Morād) is a village in Arshaq-e Markazi Rural District of Arshaq District in Meshgin Shahr County, Ardabil province, Iran.

== Demographics ==
=== Population ===
At the time of the 2006 National Census, the village's population was 31 in seven households. The following census in 2011 counted 29 people in six households. The 2016 census measured the population of the village as 50 people in 17 households.
