= Mohammadlu, Ardabil =

Village in Ardabil province, Iran

Mohammadlu Persian: محمدلو
- Village
- Location within Iran
- Country: Iran
- Province: Ardabil
- County: Meshgin Shahr
- District: Arshaq
- Rural District: Arshaq-e Markazi

Population (2016)
  - Total: 21
- Time zone: UTC+3:30 (IRST)

Mohammadloo (Persian: محمدلو) (Note: Also romanized as Mohammadloo and Moḩammadlū) is a village in Arshaq-e Markazi Rural District of Arshaq District in Meshgin Shahr County, Ardabil province, Iran.

== Demographics ==
=== Population ===
At the time of the 2006 National Census, the village's population was 19 in four households. The following census in 2011 counted seven people in four households. The 2016 census measured the population of the village as 21 people in nine households.
