= Seyyed Beyglu =

Village in Ardabil province, Iran

Seyyed Beyglu Persian: سيدبيگ لو
- Village
- Location within Iran
- Coordinates: 38°47′36″N 48°03′51″E
- Country: Iran
- Province: Ardabil
- County: Meshgin Shahr
- District: Arshaq
- Rural District: Arshaq-e Markazi

Population (2016)
  - Total: 117
- Time zone: UTC+3:30 (IRST)

Seyyed Beyglu (Persian: سيدبيگ لو) (Note: Also romanized as Seyyed Beyglū; also known as Seyyed Beglū) is a village in Arshaq-e Markazi Rural District of Arshaq District in Meshgin Shahr County, Ardabil province, Iran.

== Demographics ==
=== Population ===
At the time of the 2006 National Census, the village's population was 122 in 28 households. The following census in 2011 counted 89 people in 22 households. The 2016 census measured the population of the village as 117 people in 37 households.
