= Dagh Kandi =

Village in Ardabil province, Iran

Dagh Kandi Persian: داغ كندئ
- Village
- Location within Iran
- Coordinates: 38°48′57″N 47°41′28″E
- Country: Iran
- Province: Ardabil
- County: Meshgin Shahr
- District: Moradlu
- Rural District: Salavat

Population (2016)
  - Total: Below reporting threshold
- Time zone: UTC+3:30 (IRST)

Dagh Kandi (Persian: داغ كندئ) (Note: Also romanized as Dāgh Kandī) is a village in Salavat Rural District of Moradlu District in Meshgin Shahr County, Ardabil province, Iran.

== Demographics ==
=== Population ===
At the time of the 2006 National Census, the village's population was 45 in 11 households. The following census in 2011 counted 16 people in four households. The 2016 census measured the population of the village as below the reporting threshold.
