= Tak Bolagh-e Arshaq =

Village in Ardabil province, Iran

Tak Bolagh-e Arshaq Persian: تك بلاغ ارشق
- Village
- Location within Iran
- Coordinates: 38°47′15″N 47°47′09″E
- Country: Iran
- Province: Ardabil
- County: Meshgin Shahr
- District: Moradlu
- Rural District: Arshaq-e Gharbi

Population (2016)
  - Total: 37
- Time zone: UTC+3:30 (IRST)

Tak Bolagh-e Arshaq (Persian: تك بلاغ ارشق) (Note: Also romanized as Tak Bolāgh-e Ārshaq; also known as Tak Bolāgh) is a village in Arshaq-e Gharbi Rural District of Moradlu District in Meshgin Shahr County, Ardabil province, Iran.

== Demographics ==
=== Population ===
At the time of the 2006 National Census, the village's population was 60 in 10 households. The following census in 2011 counted 50 people in 15 households. The 2016 census measured the population of the village as 37 people in 11 households.
