= Amir Kandi =

Village in Ardabil province, Iran

Amir Kandi Persian: اميركندي
- Village
- Location within Iran
- Coordinates: 38°51′03″N 47°57′45″E
- Country: Iran
- Province: Ardabil
- County: Meshgin Shahr
- District: Arshaq
- Rural District: Arshaq-e Markazi

Population (2016)
  - Total: 48
- Time zone: UTC+3:30 (IRST)

Amir Kandi (Persian: اميركندي) (Note: Also romanized as Amīr Kandī) is a village in Arshaq-e Markazi Rural District of Arshaq District in Meshgin Shahr County, Ardabil province, Iran.

== Demographics ==
=== Population ===
At the time of the 2006 National Census, the village's population was 70 in 13 households. The following census in 2011 counted 18 people in four households. The 2016 census measured the population of the village as 48 people in 15 households.
