= Haft Cheshmeh, Ardabil =

Village in Ardabil province, Iran

Haft Cheshmeh Persian: هفت چشمه
- Village
- Location within Iran
- Coordinates: 38°40′37″N 48°03′47″E
- Country: Iran
- Province: Ardabil
- County: Meshgin Shahr
- District: Arshaq
- Rural District: Arshaq-e Markazi

Population (2016)
  - Total: 83
- Time zone: UTC+3:30 (IRST)

Haft Cheshmeh (Persian: هفت چشمه) is a village in Arshaq-e Markazi Rural District of Arshaq District in Meshgin Shahr County, Ardabil province, Iran.

== Demographics ==
=== Population ===
At the time of the 2006 National Census, the village's population was 116 in 23 households. The following census in 2011 counted 86 people in 21 households. The 2016 census measured the population of the village as 83 people in 24 households.
