= Mirza Hasan Kandi =

Village in Ardabil province, Iran

Mirza Hasan Kandi Persian: ميرزاحسن كندي
- Village
- Location within Iran
- Coordinates: 38°48′33″N 47°44′21″E
- Country: Iran
- Province: Ardabil
- County: Meshgin Shahr
- District: Moradlu
- Rural District: Salavat

Population (2016)
  - Total: 145
- Time zone: UTC+3:30 (IRST)

Mirza Hasan Kandi (Persian: ميرزاحسن كندي) (Note: Also romanized as Mīrzā Ḩasan Kandī)) is a village in Salavat Rural District of Moradlu District in Meshgin Shahr County, Ardabil province, Iran.

== Demographics ==
=== Population ===
At the time of the 2006 National Census, the village's population was 202 in 48 households. The following census in 2011 counted 181 people in 51 households. The 2016 census measured the population of the village as 145 people in 37 households.
