= Qurt Tappeh, Moradlu =

Village in Ardabil province, Iran

Qurt Tappeh Persian: قورت تپه
- Village
- Location within Iran
- Coordinates: 38°43′41″N 47°39′20″E
- Country: Iran
- Province: Ardabil
- County: Meshgin Shahr
- District: Moradlu
- Rural District: Arshaq-e Gharbi

Population (2016)
  - Total: 594
- Time zone: UTC+3:30 (IRST)

Qurt Tappeh (Persian: قورت تپه) (Note: Also romanized as Qūrt Tappeh; also known as Ghoort Tappeh) is a village in Arshaq-e Gharbi Rural District of Moradlu District in Meshgin Shahr County, Ardabil province, Iran.

== Demographics ==
=== Population ===
At the time of the 2006 National Census, the village's population was 961 in 201 households. The following census in 2011 counted 803 people in 181 households. The 2016 census measured the population of the village as 594 people in 163 households. It was the most populous village in its rural district.
