= Mir Qahremanlu =

Village in Ardabil province, Iran

Mir Qahremanlu Persian: ميرقهرمانلو
- Village
- Location within Iran
- Coordinates: 38°51′40″N 47°45′19″E
- Country: Iran
- Province: Ardabil
- County: Meshgin Shahr
- District: Moradlu
- Rural District: Salavat

Population (2016)
  - Total: 33
- Time zone: UTC+3:30 (IRST)

Mir Qahremanlu (Persian: ميرقهرمانلو) (Note: Also romanized as Mīr Qahremānlū; also known as Qahremānlū) is a village in Salavat Rural District of Moradlu District in Meshgin Shahr County, Ardabil province, Iran.

== Demographics ==
=== Population ===
At the time of the 2006 National Census, the village's population was 47 in nine households. The following census in 2011 counted 37 people in 10 households. The 2016 census measured the population of the village as 33 people in 12 households.
