= Khalifehlu, Meshgin Shahr =

Village in Ardabil province, Iran

Khalifehlu Persian: خليفه لو
- Village
- Location within Iran
- Coordinates: 38°41′10″N 48°08′19″E
- Country: Iran
- Province: Ardabil
- County: Meshgin Shahr
- District: Arshaq
- Rural District: Arshaq-e Markazi

Population (2016)
  - Total: 362
- Time zone: UTC+3:30 (IRST)

Khalifehlu (Persian: خليفه لو) (Note: Also romanized as Khalīfehlū) is a village in Arshaq-e Markazi Rural District of Arshaq District in Meshgin Shahr County, Ardabil province, Iran.

== Demographics ==
=== Population ===
At the time of the 2006 National Census, the village's population was 337 in 67 households. The following census in 2011 counted 343 people in 77 households. The 2016 census measured the population of the village as 362 people in 96 households.
