= Nuri Kandi =

Nuri Kandi (Persian: نوري كندي) may refer to:

- Abbas Qeshlaqi
- Mahmudabad, Meshgin Shahr
