= Haram, Iran =

Village in Ardabil province, Iran

Haram Persian: حرم
- Village
- Location within Iran
- Coordinates: 38°40′13″N 47°35′28″E
- Country: Iran
- Province: Ardabil
- County: Meshgin Shahr
- District: Moradlu
- Rural District: Yaft

Population (2016)
  - Total: 16
- Time zone: UTC+3:30 (IRST)

Haram (Persian: حرم) (Note: Also romanized as Ḩaram; also known as Ḩaram-e ‘Olyā va Ḩaram-e Soflá (حرم عليا و حرم سفلي) and Ḩaram Qeshlāq (حرم قشلاق)) is a village in Yaft Rural District of Moradlu District in Meshgin Shahr County, Ardabil province, Iran.

== Demographics ==
=== Population ===
At the time of the 2006 National Census, the village's population was 29 in seven households. The following census in 2011 counted 32 people in nine households. The 2016 census measured the population of the village as 16 people in four households.
