= Sari Qayah, Ardabil =

Village in Ardabil province, Iran

Sari Qayah Persian: ساری قيه
- Village
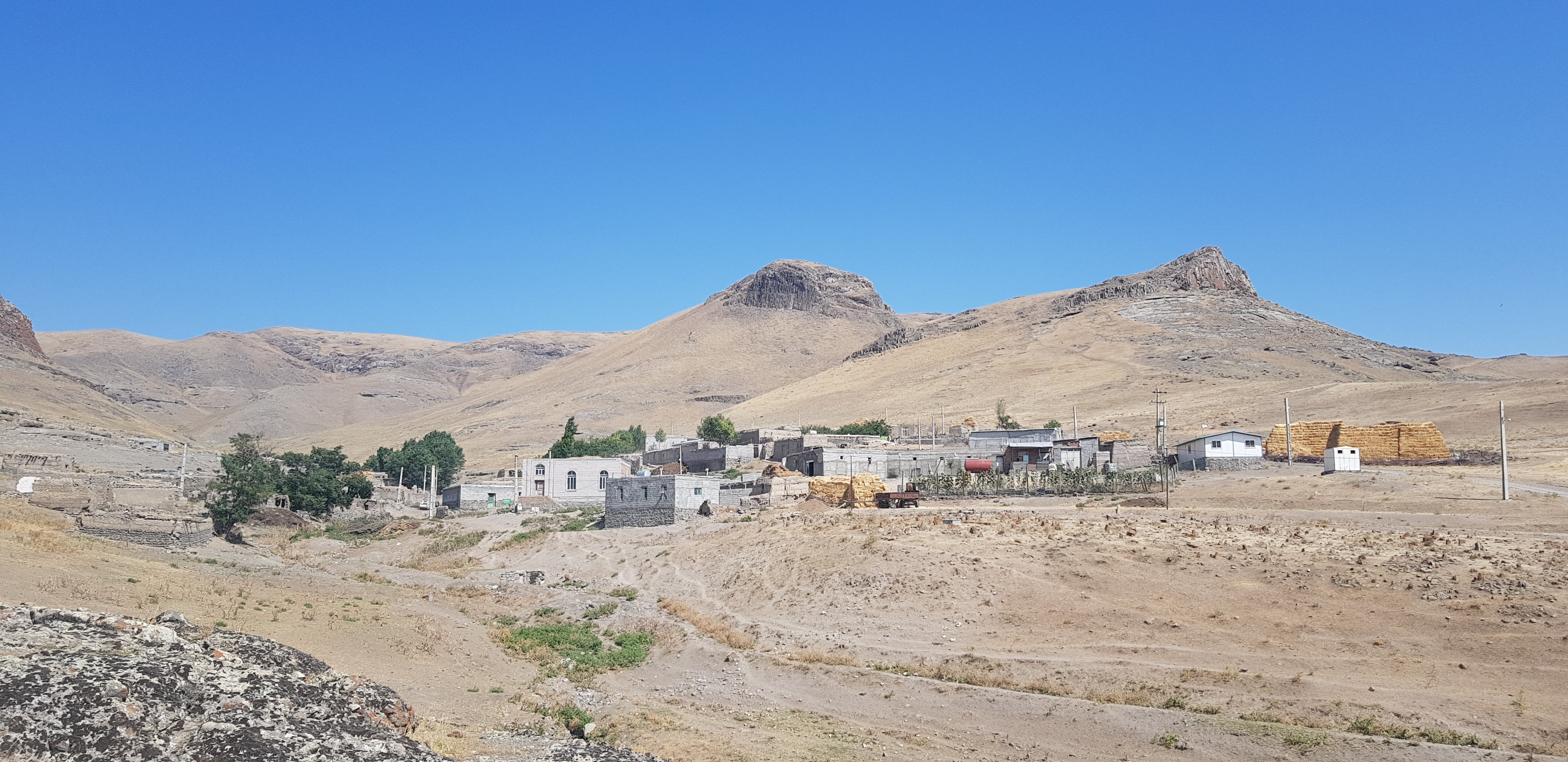
- The village of Sari Qayah

- Location within Iran
- Coordinates: 38°51′16″N 47°46′57″E
- Country: Iran
- Province: Ardabil
- County: Meshgin Shahr
- District: Moradlu
- Rural District: Salavat

Population (2016)
  - Total: 34
- Time zone: UTC+3:30 (IRST)

Sari Qayah (Persian: ساري قيه) (Note: Also romanized as Sārī Qayah and Sārī Qayeh) is a village in Salavat Rural District of Moradlu District in Meshgin Shahr County, Ardabil province, Iran.

== Demographics ==
=== Population ===
At the time of the 2006 National Census, the village's population was 60 in 16 households. The following census in 2011 counted 40 people in 13 households. The 2016 census measured the population of the village as 34 people in 11 households.

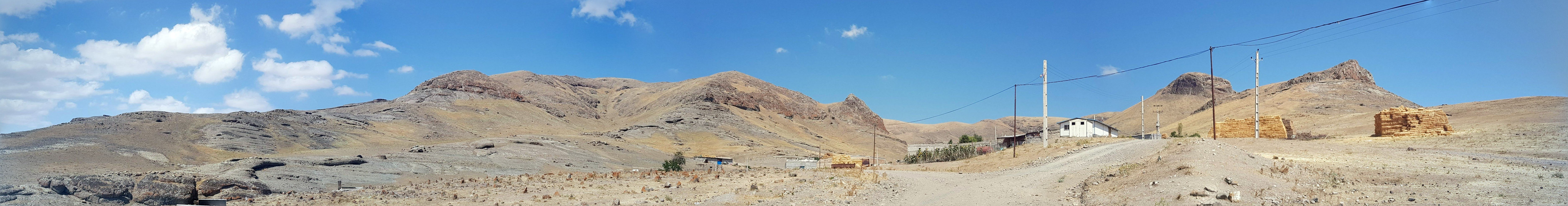
Panoramic view of Sari Qayah
