= Gachi Bolaghi-ye Sofla =

Village in Ardabil province, Iran

Gachi Bolaghi-ye Sofla Persian: گچي بلاغي سفلي
- Village
- Location within Iran
- Coordinates: 38°43′58″N 48°01′46″E
- Country: Iran
- Province: Ardabil
- County: Meshgin Shahr
- District: Arshaq
- Rural District: Arshaq-e Markazi

Population (2016)
  - Total: 47
- Time zone: UTC+3:30 (IRST)

Gachi Bolaghi-ye Sofla (Persian: گچي بلاغي سفلي) (Note: Also romanized as Gachī Bolāghī-ye Soflá) is a village in Arshaq-e Markazi Rural District of Arshaq District in Meshgin Shahr County, Ardabil province, Iran.

== Demographics ==
=== Population ===
At the time of the 2006 National Census, the village's population was 84 in 17 households. The following census in 2011 counted 49 people in 12 households. The 2016 census measured the population of the village as 47 people in 16 households.
