= Gadeh Kahriz =

Village in Ardabil province, Iran

Gadeh Kahriz Persian: گده كهريز
- Village
- Location within Iran
- Coordinates: 38°36′40″N 47°48′53″E
- Country: Iran
- Province: Ardabil
- County: Meshgin Shahr
- District: Moradlu
- Rural District: Arshaq-e Gharbi

Population (2016)
  - Total: 328
- Time zone: UTC+3:30 (IRST)

Gadeh Kahriz (Persian: گده كهريز) (Note: Also romanized as Gadeh Kahrīz; also known as Gadī Kahrīz and Gūdeh Kahrīz) is a village in Arshaq-e Gharbi Rural District of Moradlu District in Meshgin Shahr County, Ardabil province, Iran.

== Demographics ==
=== Population ===
At the time of the 2006 National Census, the village's population was 494 in 112 households. The following census in 2011 counted 401 people in 112 households. The 2016 census measured the population of the village as 328 people in 115 households.
