= Davahchi-ye Sofla =

Village in Ardabil province, Iran

Davahchi-ye Sofla Persian: دوه چي سفلي
- Village
- Location within Iran
- Coordinates: 38°38′49″N 47°51′51″E
- Country: Iran
- Province: Ardabil
- County: Meshgin Shahr
- District: Moradlu
- Rural District: Arshaq-e Gharbi

Population (2016)
  - Total: 68
- Time zone: UTC+3:30 (IRST)

Davahchi-ye Sofla (Persian: دوه چي سفلي) (Note: Also romanized as Davahchī-ye Soflá; also known as Davechī-ye Pā'īn and Davehchī) is a village in Arshaq-e Gharbi Rural District of Moradlu District in Meshgin Shahr County, Ardabil province, Iran.

== Demographics ==
=== Population ===
At the time of the 2006 National Census, the village's population was 159 in 36 households. The following census in 2011 counted 131 people in 36 households. The 2016 census measured the population of the village as 68 people in 23 households.
