= Saadat Bolaghi =

Village in Ardabil province, Iran

Saadat Bolaghi Persian: سعادت بلاغي
- Village
- Location within Iran
- Coordinates: 38°31′00″N 48°03′19″E
- Country: Iran
- Province: Ardabil
- County: Meshgin Shahr
- District: Arshaq
- Rural District: Arshaq-e Markazi

Population (2016)
  - Total: Below reporting threshold
- Time zone: UTC+3:30 (IRST)

Saadat Bolaghi (Persian: سعادت بلاغي) (Note: Also romanized as Sa‘ādat Bolāghī; also known as Sāveh Bolāghī) is a village in Arshaq-e Markazi Rural District of Arshaq District in Meshgin Shahr County, Ardabil province, Iran.

== Demographics ==
=== Population ===
At the time of the 2006 National Census, the village's population was 21 in six households. The following census in 2011 counted a population below the reporting threshold. The 2016 census again measured the population of the village as below the reporting threshold.
