= Jebar Kandi =

Village in Ardabil province, Iran

Jebar Kandi Persian: جباركندي
- Village
- Location within Iran
- Coordinates: 38°37′36″N 47°41′15″E
- Country: Iran
- Province: Ardabil
- County: Meshgin Shahr
- District: Moradlu
- Rural District: Arshaq-e Gharbi

Population (2016)
  - Total: 0
- Time zone: UTC+3:30 (IRST)

Jebar Kandi (Persian: جباركندي) (Note: Also romanized as Jebār Kandī) is a village in Arshaq-e Gharbi Rural District of Moradlu District in Meshgin Shahr County, Ardabil province, Iran.

== Demographics ==
=== Population ===
At the time of the 2006 National Census, the village's population was 32 in 10 households. The following census in 2011 counted a population below the reporting threshold. The 2016 census measured the population of the village as zero.
