= Kanchubeh =

Village in Ardabil province, Iran

Kanchubeh Persian: كنچوبه
- Village
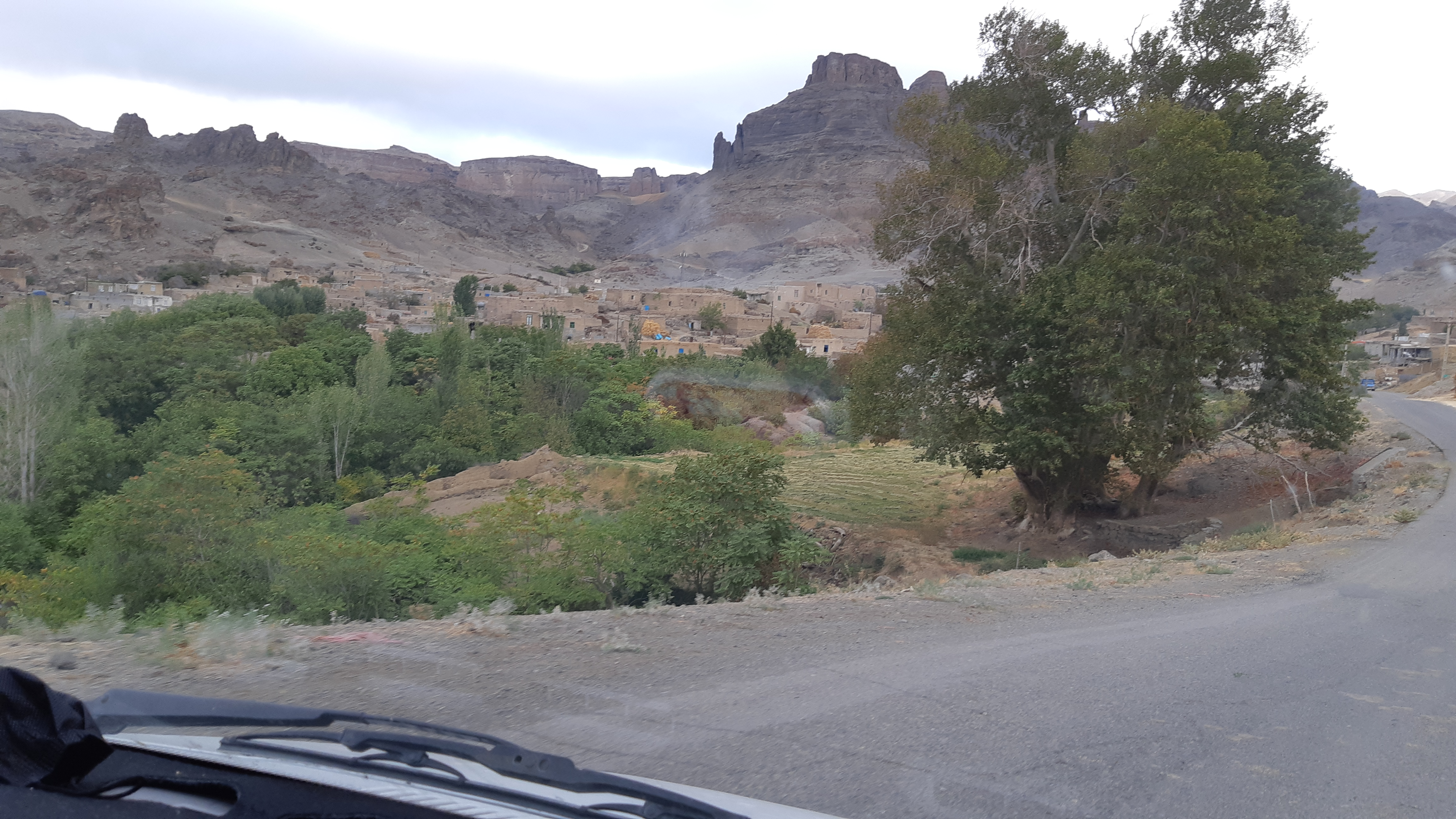
- View of Kanchubeh village from a nearby road

- Location within Iran
- Coordinates: 38°45′03″N 47°33′50″E
- Country: Iran
- Province: Ardabil
- County: Meshgin Shahr
- District: Moradlu
- Rural District: Yaft

Population (2016)
  - Total: 341
- Time zone: UTC+3:30 (IRST)

Kanchubeh (Persian: كنچوبه) (Note: Also romanized as Kanchūbeh; also known as Ganchūbeh) is a village in, and the capital of, Yaft Rural District in Moradlu District of Meshgin Shahr County, Ardabil province, Iran.

== Demographics ==
=== Population ===
At the time of the 2006 National Census, the village's population was 727 in 160 households. The following census in 2011 counted 636 people in 153 households. The 2016 census measured the population of the village as 341 people in 90 households.
