= Charchelu =

Village in Ardabil province, Iran

Charchelu Persian: چرچلو
- Village
- Location within Iran
- Coordinates: 38°47′01″N 47°30′39″E
- Country: Iran
- Province: Ardabil
- County: Meshgin Shahr
- District: Moradlu
- Rural District: Yaft

Population (2016)
  - Total: 104
- Time zone: UTC+3:30 (IRST)

Charchelu (Persian: چرچلو) (Note: Also known as Charchīlū) is a village in Yaft Rural District of Moradlu District in Meshgin Shahr County, Ardabil province, Iran.

== Demographics ==
=== Population ===
At the time of the 2006 National Census, the village's population was 271 in 57 households. The following census in 2011 counted 105 people in 24 households. The 2016 census measured the population of the village as 104 people in 28 households.
