= Mazafa =

Village in Ardabil province, Iran

Mazafa Persian: مازافا
- Village
- Location within Iran
- Coordinates: 38°41′46″N 47°42′33″E
- Country: Iran
- Province: Ardabil
- County: Meshgin Shahr
- District: Moradlu
- Rural District: Arshaq-e Gharbi

Population (2016)
  - Total: 519
- Time zone: UTC+3:30 (IRST)

Mazafa (Persian: مازافا) (Note: Also romanized as Māzāfā; also known as Maẕāfeh and Moẕāfah) is a village in Arshaq-e Gharbi Rural District of Moradlu District in Meshgin Shahr County, Ardabil province, Iran.

== Demographics ==
=== Population ===
At the time of the 2006 National Census, the village's population was 621 in 144 households. The following census in 2011 counted 592 people in 161 households. The 2016 census measured the population of the village as 519 people in 149 households.
