= Agh Bad-e Gaduk =

Village in Ardabil province, Iran

Agh Bad-e Gaduk Persian: آغ بد گدوك
- Village
- Location within Iran
- Coordinates: 38°49′14″N 47°58′35″E
- Country: Iran
- Province: Ardabil
- County: Meshgin Shahr
- District: Arshaq
- Rural District: Arshaq-e Markazi

Population (2016)
  - Total: 84
- Time zone: UTC+3:30 (IRST)

Agh Bad-e Gaduk (Persian: آغ بد گدوك) (Note: Also romanized as Āgh Bad-e Gadūk; also known as Agh Bolagh-e Gaduk-e Sofla) is a village in Arshaq-e Markazi Rural District of Arshaq District in Meshgin Shahr County, Ardabil province, Iran.

== Demographics ==
=== Population ===
At the time of the 2006 National Census, the village's population was 172 in 40 households. The following census in 2011 counted 76 people in 24 households. The 2016 census measured the population of the village as 84 people in 36 households.
