= Jabbarlu, Ardabil =

Village in Ardabil province, Iran

Jabbarlu Persian: جبارلو
- Village
- Location within Iran
- Coordinates: 38°36′04″N 47°58′46″E
- Country: Iran
- Province: Ardabil
- County: Meshgin Shahr
- District: Arshaq
- Rural District: Arshaq-e Markazi

Population (2016)
  - Total: 366
- Time zone: UTC+3:30 (IRST)

Jabbarlu (Persian: جبارلو) (Note: Also romanized as Jabbārlū) is a village in Arshaq-e Markazi Rural District of Arshaq District in Meshgin Shahr County, Ardabil province, Iran.

== Demographics ==
=== Population ===
At the time of the 2006 National Census, the village's population was 423 in 84 households. The following census in 2011 counted 355 people in 98 households. The 2016 census measured the population of the village as 366 people in 110 households.
