= Kharabeh Razi =

Village in Ardabil province, Iran

Coordinates: 38°31′48″N 48°01′30″E

Kharabeh Razi Persian: خرابه رضي
- Village
- Location within Iran
- Country: Iran
- Province: Ardabil
- County: Meshgin Shahr
- District: Arshaq
- Rural District: Arshaq-e Markazi

Population (2016)
  - Total: 82
- Time zone: UTC+3:30 (IRST)

Kharabeh Razi (Persian: خرابه رضي) (Note: Also romanized as Kharābeh Raẕī) is a village in Arshaq-e Markazi Rural District of Arshaq District in Meshgin Shahr County, Ardabil province, Iran.

== Demographics ==
=== Population ===
At the time of the 2006 National Census, the village's population was 53 in nine households. The following census in 2011 counted 52 people in 13 households. The 2016 census measured the population of the village as 82 people in 25 households.
