= Heydarabad, Ardabil =

Village in Ardabil province, Iran

Heydarabad Persian: حیدرآباد
- Village
- Location within Iran
- Coordinates: 38°30′28″N 48°06′35″E
- Country: Iran
- Province: Ardabil
- County: Meshgin Shahr
- District: Arshaq
- Rural District: Arshaq-e Markazi

Population (2016)
  - Total: 116
- Time zone: UTC+3:30 (IRST)

Heydarabad (Persian: حیدرآباد) (Note: Also romanized as Ḩeydarābād; also known as ‘Alīābād) is a village in Arshaq-e Markazi Rural District of Arshaq District in Meshgin Shahr County, Ardabil province, Iran.

== Demographics ==
=== Population ===
At the time of the 2006 National Census, the village's population was 208 in 45 households. The following census in 2011 counted 150 people in 31 households. The 2016 census measured the population of the village as 116 people in 30 households.
