= Qurlu =

Village in Ardabil province, Iran

Qurlu Persian: قورلو
- Village
- Location within Iran
- Coordinates: 38°40′27″N 48°09′49″E
- Country: Iran
- Province: Ardabil
- County: Meshgin Shahr
- District: Arshaq
- Rural District: Arshaq-e Markazi

Population (2016)
  - Total: 51
- Time zone: UTC+3:30 (IRST)

Qurlu (Persian: قورلو) (Note: Also romanized as Qūrlū) is a village in Arshaq-e Markazi Rural District of Arshaq District in Meshgin Shahr County, Ardabil province, Iran.

== Demographics ==
=== Population ===
At the time of the 2006 National Census, the village's population was 64 in 15 households. The following census in 2011 counted 37 people in nine households. The 2016 census measured the population of the village as 51 people in 17 households.
