= Mir Hoseynlu =

Village in Ardabil province, Iran

Mir Hoseynlu Persian: ميرحسينلو
- Village
- Location within Iran
- Coordinates: 38°40′32″N 48°13′51″E
- Country: Iran
- Province: Ardabil
- County: Meshgin Shahr
- District: Arshaq
- Rural District: Arshaq-e Markazi

Population (2016)
  - Total: 111
- Time zone: UTC+3:30 (IRST)

Mir Hoseynlu (Persian: ميرحسينلو) (Note: Also romanized as Mīr Ḩoseynlū) is a village in Arshaq-e Markazi Rural District of Arshaq District in Meshgin Shahr County, Ardabil province, Iran.

== Demographics ==
=== Population ===
At the time of the 2006 National Census, the village's population was 98 in 22 households. The following census in 2011 counted 92 people in 25 households. The 2016 census measured the population of the village as 111 people in 33 households.
