= Viz Darreh =

Village in Ardabil province, Iran

Viz Darreh Persian: ويزدره
- Village
- Country: Iran
- Province: Ardabil
- County: Meshgin Shahr
- District: Moradlu
- Rural District: Yaft

Population (2016)
  - Total: 25
- Time zone: UTC+3:30 (IRST)

Viz Darreh (Persian: ويزدره) (Note: Also romanized as Vīz Darreh) is a village in Yaft Rural District of Moradlu District in Meshgin Shahr County, Ardabil province, Iran.

== Demographics ==
=== Population ===
At the time of the 2006 National Census, the village's population was 19 in six households. The following census in 2011 counted 12 people in four households. The 2016 census measured the population of the village as 25 people in seven households.
