= Zargar-e Goli Bolaghi =

Village in Ardabil province, Iran

Zargar-e Goli Bolaghi Persian: زرگرگلي بلاغي
- Village
- Location within Iran
- Coordinates: 38°48′07″N 47°50′38″E
- Country: Iran
- Province: Ardabil
- County: Meshgin Shahr
- District: Moradlu
- Rural District: Arshaq-e Gharbi

Population (2016)
  - Total: 173
- Time zone: UTC+3:30 (IRST)

Zargar-e Goli Bolaghi (Persian: زرگرگلي بلاغي) (Note: Also romanized as Zargar-e Golī Bolāghī; also known as Zargar-e Golī Bolāgh) is a village in Arshaq-e Gharbi Rural District of Moradlu District in Meshgin Shahr County, Ardabil province, Iran.

== Demographics ==
=== Population ===
At the time of the 2006 National Census, the village's population was 259 in 48 households. The following census in 2011 counted 187 people in 43 households. The 2016 census measured the population of the village as 173 people in 45 households.
