= Barak Chay =

Village in Ardabil province, Iran

Barak Chay Persian: برك چاي
- Village
- Location within Iran
- Coordinates: 38°42′22″N 48°03′48″E
- Country: Iran
- Province: Ardabil
- County: Meshgin Shahr
- District: Arshaq
- Rural District: Arshaq-e Markazi

Population (2016)
  - Total: 151
- Time zone: UTC+3:30 (IRST)

Barak Chay (Persian: برك چاي) (Note: Also romanized as Barkchay and Barkchāy; also known as Bargchāy and Bertchāy) is a village in Arshaq-e Markazi Rural District of Arshaq District in Meshgin Shahr County, Ardabil province, Iran.

== Demographics ==
=== Population ===
At the time of the 2006 National Census, the village's population was 251 in 52 households. The following census in 2011 counted 167 people in 43 households. The 2016 census measured the population of the village as 151 people in 44 households.
