= Koleh Digeh =

Village in Ardabil province, Iran

Koleh Digeh Persian: كله ديگه
- Village
- Location within Iran
- Country: Iran
- Province: Ardabil
- County: Meshgin Shahr
- District: Moradlu
- Rural District: Arshaq-e Gharbi

Population (2016)
  - Total: 35
- Time zone: UTC+3:30 (IRST)

Koleh Digeh (Persian: كله ديگه) (Note: Also romanized as Koleh Dīgeh; also known as Kūleh Dīgeh) is a village in Arshaq-e Gharbi Rural District of Moradlu District in Meshgin Shahr County, Ardabil province, Iran.

== Demographics ==
=== Population ===
At the time of the 2006 National Census, the village's population was 34 in five households. The following census in 2011 counted 39 people in six households. The 2016 census measured the population of the village as 35 people in nine households.
