= Agh Bolagh-e Olya =

Village in Ardabil province, Iran

Agh Bolagh-e Olya Persian: اغ بلاغ عليا
- Village
- Location within Iran
- Coordinates: 38°38′38″N 48°15′41″E
- Country: Iran
- Province: Ardabil
- County: Meshgin Shahr
- District: Arshaq
- Rural District: Arshaq-e Markazi

Population (2016)
  - Total: 16
- Time zone: UTC+3:30 (IRST)

Agh Bolagh-e Olya (Persian: اغ بلاغ عليا) (Note: Also romanized as Āgh Bolāgh-e ‘Olyā; also known as Āgh Bolāgh-e Bālā and Āq Bolāgh-e Bālā) is a village in Arshaq-e Markazi Rural District of Arshaq District in Meshgin Shahr County, Ardabil province, Iran.

== Demographics ==
=== Population ===
At the time of the 2006 National Census, the village's population was 24 in six households. The following census in 2011 counted 18 people in six households. The 2016 census measured the population of the village as 16 people in five households.
