= Chanbalu Qeshlaq =

Village in Ardabil province, Iran

Chanbalu Qeshlaq Persian: چنبلوقشلاق
- Village
- Location within Iran
- Country: Iran
- Province: Ardabil
- County: Meshgin Shahr
- District: Arshaq
- Rural District: Arshaq-e Markazi

Population (2016)
  - Total: 0
- Time zone: UTC+3:30 (IRST)

Chanbalu Qeshlaq (Persian: چنبلوقشلاق) (Note: Also romanized as Chanbalū Qeshlāq; also known as Chebenlū-ye Qeshlāq and Qeshlāq-e Razī) is a village in Arshaq-e Markazi Rural District of Arshaq District in Meshgin Shahr County, Ardabil province, Iran.

== Demographics ==
=== Population ===
At the time of the 2006 National Census, the village's population was 27 in eight households. The village did not appear in the following census of 2011. The 2016 census measured the population of the village as zero.
