= Akbar Kandi =

Village in Ardabil province, Iran

Akbar Kandi Persian: اكبركندي
- Village
- Location within Iran
- Coordinates: 38°44′54″N 47°37′00″E
- Country: Iran
- Province: Ardabil
- County: Meshgin Shahr
- District: Moradlu
- Rural District: Yaft

Population (2016)
  - Total: 32
- Time zone: UTC+3:30 (IRST)

Akbar Kandi (Persian: اكبركندي) (Note: Also romanized as Akbar Kandī; also known as Akbarkandī) is a village in Yaft Rural District of Moradlu District in Meshgin Shahr County, Ardabil province, Iran.

== Demographics ==
=== Population ===
At the time of the 2006 National Census, the village's population was 103 in 26 households. The following census in 2011 counted 59 people in 17 households. The 2016 census measured the population of the village as 32 people in 12 households.
