= Zakilu =

Village in Ardabil province, Iran

Zakilu Persian: ذكيلو
- Village
- Location within Iran
- Coordinates: 38°38′21″N 48°08′34″E
- Country: Iran
- Province: Ardabil
- County: Meshgin Shahr
- District: Arshaq
- Rural District: Arshaq-e Markazi

Population (2016)
  - Total: 77
- Time zone: UTC+3:30 (IRST)

Zakilu (Persian: ذكيلو) (Note: Also romanized as Z̄akīlū) is a village in Arshaq-e Markazi Rural District of Arshaq District in Meshgin Shahr County, Ardabil province, Iran.

== Demographics ==
=== Population ===
At the time of the 2006 National Census, the village's population was 103 in 18 households. The following census in 2011 counted 85 people in 15 households. The 2016 census measured the population of the village as 77 people in 21 households.
