= Gachi Bolaghi-ye Olya =

Village in Ardabil province, Iran

Gachi Bolaghi-ye Olya Persian: گچي بلاغي عليا
- Village
- Location within Iran
- Coordinates: 38°44′27″N 48°02′23″E
- Country: Iran
- Province: Ardabil
- County: Meshgin Shahr
- District: Arshaq
- Rural District: Arshaq-e Markazi

Population (2016)
  - Total: 9
- Time zone: UTC+3:30 (IRST)

Gachi Bolaghi-ye Olya (Persian: گچي بلاغي عليا) is a village in Arshaq-e Markazi Rural District of Arshaq District in Meshgin Shahr County, Ardabil province, Iran.

== Demographics ==
=== Population ===
The village did not appear in the 2006 and 2011 National Censuses. The 2016 census measured the population of the village as nine people in four households.
