= Eslam Kandi =

Village in Ardabil province, Iran

Eslam Kandi Persian: اسلام كندي
- Village
- Location within Iran
- Coordinates: 38°53′12″N 47°47′28″E
- Country: Iran
- Province: Ardabil
- County: Meshgin Shahr
- District: Moradlu
- Rural District: Salavat

Population (2016)
  - Total: 72
- Time zone: UTC+3:30 (IRST)

Eslam Kandi (Persian: اسلام كندي) (Note: Also romanized as Eslām Kandī; also known as Qurtlu (قورتلو)) is a village in Salavat Rural District of Moradlu District in Meshgin Shahr County, Ardabil province, Iran.

== Demographics ==
=== Population ===
At the time of the 2006 National Census, the village's population was 106 in 26 households. The following census in 2011 counted 82 people in 24 households. The 2016 census measured the population of the village as 72 people in 21 households.
