= Galasan Gurasan =

Village in Ardabil province, Iran

Galasan Gurasan Persian: گلسن گورسن
- Village
- Location within Iran
- Coordinates: 38°39′04″N 47°42′16″E
- Country: Iran
- Province: Ardabil
- County: Meshgin Shahr
- District: Moradlu
- Rural District: Arshaq-e Gharbi

Population (2016)
  - Total: 38
- Time zone: UTC+3:30 (IRST)

Galasan Gurasan (Persian: گلسن گورسن) (Note: Also romanized as Galasan Gūrasan) is a village in Arshaq-e Gharbi Rural District of Moradlu District in Meshgin Shahr County, Ardabil province, Iran.

== Demographics ==
=== Population ===
At the time of the 2006 National Census, the village's population was 30 in nine households. The following census in 2011 counted 32 people in nine households. The 2016 census measured the population of the village as 38 people in 10 households.
