= Gun Papaq-e Olya =

Village in Ardabil province, Iran

Gun Papaq-e Olya Persian: گون پاپاق عليا
- Village
- Location within Iran
- Coordinates: 38°50′28″N 47°55′29″E
- Country: Iran
- Province: Ardabil
- County: Meshgin Shahr
- District: Moradlu
- Rural District: Arshaq-e Gharbi

Population (2016)
  - Total: 104
- Time zone: UTC+3:30 (IRST)

Gun Papaq-e Olya (Persian: گون پاپاق عليا) (Note: Also romanized as Gūn Pāpāq-e ‘Olyā; also known as Gūn Pāpāq and Gūnpāpāq-e Bālā) is a village in Arshaq-e Gharbi Rural District of Moradlu District in Meshgin Shahr County, Ardabil province, Iran.

== Demographics ==
=== Population ===
At the time of the 2006 National Census, the village's population was 208 in 38 households. The following census in 2011 counted 146 people in 32 households. The 2016 census measured the population of the village as 104 people in 26 households.
