= Niazqoli =

Village in Ardabil province, Iran

Niazqoli Persian: نيازقلي
- Village
- Location within Iran
- Coordinates: 38°46′03″N 47°41′17″E
- Country: Iran
- Province: Ardabil
- County: Meshgin Shahr
- District: Moradlu
- Rural District: Arshaq-e Gharbi

Population (2016)
  - Total: 22
- Time zone: UTC+3:30 (IRST)

Niazqoli (Persian: نيازقلي) (Note: Also romanized as Nīāzqolī) is a village in Arshaq-e Gharbi Rural District of Moradlu District in Meshgin Shahr County, Ardabil province, Iran.

== Demographics ==
=== Population ===
At the time of the 2006 National Census, the village's population was 85 in 18 households. The following census in 2011 counted 49 people in 14 households. The 2016 census measured the population of the village as 22 people in five households.
