= Lengehbiz =

Village in Ardabil province, Iran

Lengehbiz Persian: لنگه بيز
- Village
- Location within Iran
- Coordinates: 38°42′36″N 48°12′09″E
- Country: Iran
- Province: Ardabil
- County: Meshgin Shahr
- District: Arshaq
- Rural District: Arshaq-e Markazi

Population (2016)
  - Total: 103
- Time zone: UTC+3:30 (IRST)

Lengehbiz (Persian: لنگه بيز) (Note: Also romanized as Lengehbīz) is a village in Arshaq-e Markazi Rural District of Arshaq District in Meshgin Shahr County, Ardabil province, Iran.

== Demographics ==
=== Population ===
At the time of the 2006 National Census, the village's population was 102 in 21 households. The following census in 2011 counted 90 people in 20 households. The 2016 census measured the population of the village as 103 people in 27 households.
