= Chupan Qeshlaqi =

Village in Ardabil province, Iran

Chupan Qeshlaqi Persian: چوپان قشلاقي
- Village
- Location within Iran
- Country: Iran
- Province: Ardabil
- County: Meshgin Shahr
- District: Arshaq
- Rural District: Arshaq-e Markazi

Population (2016)
  - Total: 0
- Time zone: UTC+3:30 (IRST)

Chupan Qeshlaqi (Persian: چوپان قشلاقي) (Note: Also romanized as Chūpān Qeshlāqī; also known as Chopānqeshlāqī) is a village in Arshaq-e Markazi Rural District of Arshaq District in Meshgin Shahr County, Ardabil province, Iran.

== Demographics ==
=== Population ===
At the time of the 2006 National Census, the village's population was 26 in five households. The village did not appear in the following census of 2011. The 2016 census measured the population of the village as zero.
