= Qarahlu =

Village in Ardabil province, Iran

Qarahlu Persian: قره لو
- Village
- Location within Iran
- Coordinates: 38°37′02″N 48°13′43″E
- Country: Iran
- Province: Ardabil
- County: Meshgin Shahr
- District: Arshaq
- Rural District: Arshaq-e Markazi

Population (2016)
  - Total: 131
- Time zone: UTC+3:30 (IRST)

Qarahlu (Persian: قره لو) (Note: Also romanized as Qarahlū) is a village in Arshaq-e Markazi Rural District of Arshaq District in Meshgin Shahr County, Ardabil province, Iran.

== Demographics ==
=== Population ===
At the time of the 2006 National Census, the village's population was 228 in 47 households. The following census in 2011 counted 171 people in 45 households. The 2016 census measured the population of the village as 131 people in 36 households.
