= Shamsir =

Village in Ardabil province, Iran

Shamsir Persian: شمسير
- Village
- Location within Iran
- Coordinates: 38°39′19″N 47°49′30″E
- Country: Iran
- Province: Ardabil
- County: Meshgin Shahr
- District: Moradlu
- Rural District: Arshaq-e Gharbi

Population (2016)
  - Total: 198
- Time zone: UTC+3:30 (IRST)

Shamsir (Persian: شمسير) (Note: Also romanized as Shamsīr) is a village in Arshaq-e Gharbi Rural District of Moradlu District in Meshgin Shahr County, Ardabil province, Iran.

== Demographics ==
=== Population ===
At the time of the 2006 National Census, the village's population was 255 in 53 households. The following census in 2011 counted 231 people in 62 households. The 2016 census measured the population of the village as 198 people in 59 households.
