= Kazemlu =

Village in Ardabil province, Iran

Kazemlu Persian: كاظم لو
- Village
- Location within Iran
- Coordinates: 38°40′30″N 48°07′50″E
- Country: Iran
- Province: Ardabil
- County: Meshgin Shahr
- District: Arshaq
- Rural District: Arshaq-e Markazi

Population (2016)
  - Total: 15
- Time zone: UTC+3:30 (IRST)

Kazemlu (Persian: كاظم لو) (Note: Also romanized as Kāz̧emlū) is a village in Arshaq-e Markazi Rural District of Arshaq District in Meshgin Shahr County, Ardabil province, Iran.

== Demographics ==
=== Population ===
At the time of the 2006 National Census, the village's population was 30 in five households. The following census in 2011 counted a population below the reporting threshold. The 2016 census measured the population of the village as 15 people in four households.
