= Khordeh Qeshlaq =

Khordeh Qeshlaq (Persian: خرده قشلاق) may refer to:

- Khordeh Qeshlaq, Ardabil
- Khordeh Qeshlaq, East Azerbaijan
