= Qeshlaq-e Mohammad Qoli, Ardabil =

Village in Ardabil province, Iran

Qeshlaq-e Mohammad Qoli Persian: قشلاق محمدقلي
- Village
- Location within Iran
- Coordinates: 38°46′21″N 48°02′40″E
- Country: Iran
- Province: Ardabil
- County: Meshgin Shahr
- District: Arshaq
- Rural District: Arshaq-e Markazi

Population (2016)
  - Total: 97
- Time zone: UTC+3:30 (IRST)

Qeshlaq-e Mohammad Qoli (Persian: قشلاق محمدقلي) (Note: Also romanized as Qeshlāq-e Moḩammad Qolī) is a village in Arshaq-e Markazi Rural District of Arshaq District in Meshgin Shahr County, Ardabil province, Iran.

== Demographics ==
=== Population ===
At the time of the 2006 National Census, the village's population was 95 in 19 households. The following census in 2011 counted 86 people in 20 households. The 2016 census measured the population of the village as 97 people in 30 households.
