= Gerdeh Gol =

Village in Ardabil province, Iran

Gerdeh Gol Persian: گرده گل
- Village
- Location within Iran
- Coordinates: 38°46′09″N 47°34′29″E
- Country: Iran
- Province: Ardabil
- County: Meshgin Shahr
- District: Moradlu
- Rural District: Yaft

Population (2016)
  - Total: Below reporting threshold
- Time zone: UTC+3:30 (IRST)

Gerdeh Gol (Persian: گرده گل) (Note: Also known as Gerdgol) is a village in Yaft Rural District of Moradlu District in Meshgin Shahr County, Ardabil province, Iran.

== Demographics ==
=== Population ===
At the time of the 2006 National Census, the village's population was 39 in eight households. The following census in 2011 counted 23 people in five households. The 2016 census measured the population of the village as below the reporting threshold.
