= Post Kandi =

Village in Ardabil province, Iran

Post Kandi Persian: پست كندي
- Village
- Location within Iran
- Coordinates: 38°44′14″N 48°09′48″E
- Country: Iran
- Province: Ardabil
- County: Meshgin Shahr
- District: Arshaq
- Rural District: Arshaq-e Markazi

Population (2016)
  - Total: 63
- Time zone: UTC+3:30 (IRST)

Post Kandi (Persian: پست كندي) (Note: Also romanized as Post Kandī) is a village in Arshaq-e Markazi Rural District of Arshaq District in Meshgin Shahr County, Ardabil province, Iran.

== Demographics ==
=== Population ===
At the time of the 2006 National Census, the village's population was 27 in eight households. The following census in 2011 counted 32 people in nine households. The 2016 census measured the population of the village as 63 people in 19 households.
