= Qanlu Bolagh =

Village in Ardabil province, Iran

Qanlu Bolagh Persian: قانلوبلاغ
- Village
- Location within Iran
- Coordinates: 38°49′42″N 48°01′16″E
- Country: Iran
- Province: Ardabil
- County: Meshgin Shahr
- District: Arshaq
- Rural District: Arshaq-e Markazi

Population (2016)
  - Total: 94
- Time zone: UTC+3:30 (IRST)

Qanlu Bolagh (Persian: قانلوبلاغ) (Note: Also romanized as Qānlū Bolāgh) is a village in Arshaq-e Markazi Rural District of Arshaq District in Meshgin Shahr County, Ardabil province, Iran.

== Demographics ==
=== Population ===
At the time of the 2006 National Census, the village's population was 149 in 34 households. The following census in 2011 counted 99 people in 24 households. The 2016 census measured the population of the village as 94 people in 32 households.
