= Rahim Beyglui =

Rahim Beyglui (Persian: رحيم بيگلوي), also rendered as Rahim Beyglu, may refer to:

- Rahim Beyglui-ye Olya
- Rahim Beyglui-ye Sofla
