= Sohrablu =

Village in Ardabil province, Iran

Sohrablu Persian: سهرابلو
- Village
- Location within Iran
- Coordinates: 38°41′02″N 48°05′01″E
- Country: Iran
- Province: Ardabil
- County: Meshgin Shahr
- District: Arshaq
- Rural District: Arshaq-e Markazi

Population (2016)
  - Total: 184
- Time zone: UTC+3:30 (IRST)

Sohrablu (Persian: سهرابلو) (Note: Also romanized as Sohrāblū) is a village in Arshaq-e Markazi Rural District of Arshaq District in Meshgin Shahr County, Ardabil province, Iran.

== Demographics ==
=== Population ===
At the time of the 2006 National Census, the village's population was 215 in 41 households. The following census in 2011 counted 183 people in 43 households. The 2016 census measured the population of the village as 184 people in 60 households.
