= Karamlu =

Karamlu (Persian: كرملو) may refer to:

- Karamlu, Ardabil
- Karamlu, East Azerbaijan
