= Taqcheh Dash =

Village in Ardabil province, Iran

Taqcheh Dash Persian: طاقچه داش
- Village
- Location within Iran
- Coordinates: 38°43′35″N 48°06′19″E
- Country: Iran
- Province: Ardabil
- County: Meshgin Shahr
- District: Arshaq
- Rural District: Arshaq-e Markazi

Population (2016)
  - Total: Below reporting threshold
- Time zone: UTC+3:30 (IRST)

Taqcheh Dash (Persian: طاقچه داش) (Note: Also romanized as Ţāqcheh Dāsh) is a village in Arshaq-e Markazi Rural District of Arshaq District in Meshgin Shahr County, Ardabil province, Iran.

== Demographics ==
=== Population ===
At the time of the 2006 National Census, the village's population was 30 in five households. The following census in 2011 counted 23 people in four households. The 2016 census measured the population of the village as below the reporting threshold.
