= Qarah Aghaj, Meshgin Shahr =

Village in Ardabil province, Iran

Qarah Aghaj Persian: قره اغاج
- Village
- Location within Iran
- Coordinates: 38°46′13″N 47°31′20″E
- Country: Iran
- Province: Ardabil
- County: Meshgin Shahr
- District: Moradlu
- Rural District: Yaft

Population (2016)
  - Total: 509
- Time zone: UTC+3:30 (IRST)

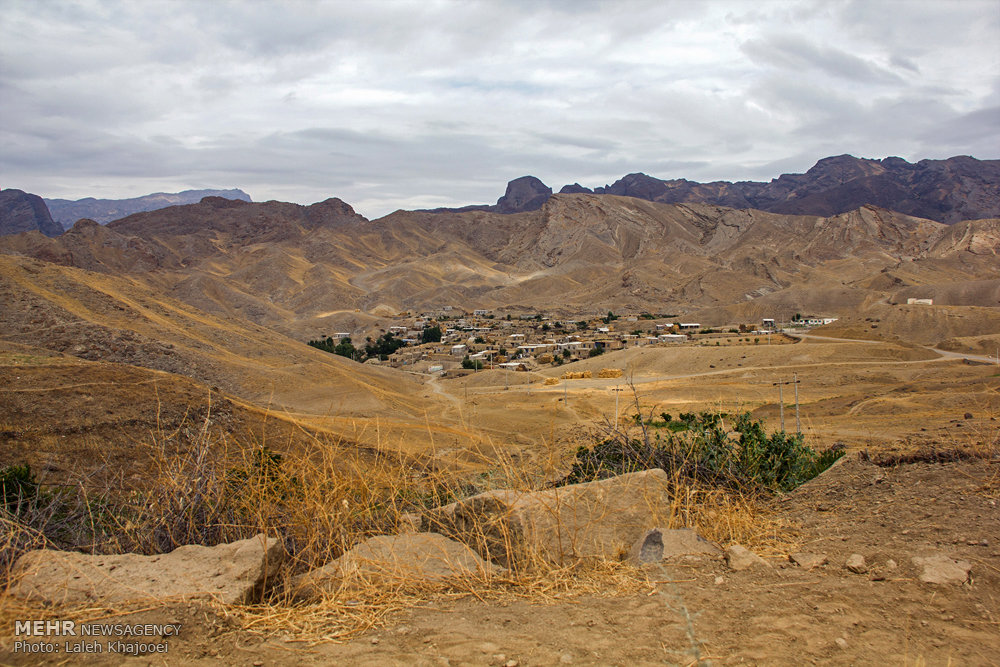
Overview of the village of Qara Aghaj

Qarah Aghaj (Persian: قره اغاج) (Note: Also romanized as Qarah Āghāj and Qareh Āghāj; also known as Qarah Āghājlū and Qareh Āqāj) is a village in Yaft Rural District of Moradlu District in Meshgin Shahr County, Ardabil province, Iran.

== Demographics ==
=== Population ===
At the time of the 2006 National Census, the village's population was 586 in 101 households. The following census in 2011 counted 611 people in 134 households. The 2016 census measured the population of the village as 509 people in 128 households.
