= Ali Kahrizi, Moradlu =

Village in Ardabil province, Iran

Ali Kahrizi Persian: علي كهريزي
- Village
- Location within Iran
- Coordinates: 38°38′18″N 47°48′42″E
- Country: Iran
- Province: Ardabil
- County: Meshgin Shahr
- District: Moradlu
- Rural District: Arshaq-e Gharbi

Population (2016)
  - Total: 84
- Time zone: UTC+3:30 (IRST)

Ali Kahrizi (Persian: علي كهريزي) (Note: Also romanized as ‘Ālī Kahrīzī; also known as ‘Alī Kahrīz) is a village in Arshaq-e Gharbi Rural District of Moradlu District in Meshgin Shahr County, Ardabil province, Iran.

== Demographics ==
=== Population ===
At the time of the 2006 National Census, the village's population was 121 in 35 households. The following census in 2011 counted 101 people in 33 households. The 2016 census measured the population of the village as 84 people in 28 households.
