= Chakhar Chamani =

Village in Ardabil province, Iran

Chakhar Chamani Persian: چاخرچمني
- Village
- Location within Iran
- Coordinates: 38°47′27″N 47°48′13″E
- Country: Iran
- Province: Ardabil
- County: Meshgin Shahr
- District: Moradlu
- Rural District: Arshaq-e Gharbi

Population (2016)
  - Total: 133
- Time zone: UTC+3:30 (IRST)

Chakhar Chamani (Persian: چاخرچمني) (Note: Also romanized as Chākhar Chamanī and Chākher Chamanī; also known as Chahār Chaman) is a village in Arshaq-e Gharbi Rural District of Moradlu District in Meshgin Shahr County, Ardabil province, Iran.

== Demographics ==
=== Population ===
At the time of the 2006 National Census, the village's population was 192 in 48 households. The following census in 2011 counted 154 people in 44 households. The 2016 census measured the population of the village as 133 people in 46 households.
