= Ordukhan Kandi =

Village in Ardabil province, Iran

Ordukhan Kandi Persian: اردوخانكندي
- Village
- Location within Iran
- Coordinates: 38°42′31″N 47°46′55″E
- Country: Iran
- Province: Ardabil
- County: Meshgin Shahr
- District: Moradlu
- Rural District: Arshaq-e Gharbi

Population (2016)
  - Total: 123
- Time zone: UTC+3:30 (IRST)

Ordukhan Kandi (Persian: اردوخانكندي) (Note: Also romanized as Ordūkhān Kandī) is a village in Arshaq-e Gharbi Rural District of Moradlu District in Meshgin Shahr County, Ardabil province, Iran.

== Demographics ==
=== Population ===
At the time of the 2006 National Census, the village's population was 175 in 33 households. The following census in 2011 counted 163 people in 43 households. The 2016 census measured the population of the village as 123 people in 35 households.
