= Dikdaraq =

Village in Ardabil province, Iran

Dikdaraq Persian: ديكدرق
- Village
- Location within Iran
- Coordinates: 38°46′40″N 47°32′56″E
- Country: Iran
- Province: Ardabil
- County: Meshgin Shahr
- District: Moradlu
- Rural District: Yaft

Population (2016)
  - Total: 84
- Time zone: UTC+3:30 (IRST)

Dikdaraq (Persian: ديكدرق) (Note: Also romanized as Dīkdaraq; also known as Dīg Daraq) is a village in Yaft Rural District of Moradlu District in Meshgin Shahr County, Ardabil province, Iran.

== Demographics ==
=== Population ===
At the time of the 2006 National Census, the village's population was 115 in 21 households. The following census in 2011 counted 101 people in 22 households. The 2016 census measured the population of the village as 84 people in 21 households.
