= Tumar Darrahsi =

Tumar Darrahsi or Tumar Darrehsi (Persian: طوماردره سي) may refer to:

- Tumar Darrahsi-ye Olya
- Tumar Darrahsi-ye Sofla
