= Qarah Gol, Moradlu =

Village in Ardabil province, Iran

Qarah Gol Persian: قره گل
- Village
- Location within Iran
- Coordinates: 38°44′36″N 47°43′26″E
- Country: Iran
- Province: Ardabil
- County: Meshgin Shahr
- District: Moradlu
- Rural District: Arshaq-e Gharbi

Population (2016)
  - Total: 346
- Time zone: UTC+3:30 (IRST)

Qarah Gol (Persian: قره گل) is a village in Arshaq-e Gharbi Rural District of Moradlu District in Meshgin Shahr County, Ardabil province, Iran.

== Demographics ==
=== Population ===
At the time of the 2006 National Census, the village's population was 421 in 87 households. The following census in 2011 counted 390 people in 99 households. The 2016 census measured the population of the village as 346 people in 93 households.
