= Agh Bolagh-e Sofla =

Village in Ardabil province, Iran

Agh Bolagh-e Sofla Persian: اغ بلاغ سفلي
- Village
- Location within Iran
- Coordinates: 38°38′06″N 48°15′34″E
- Country: Iran
- Province: Ardabil
- County: Meshgin Shahr
- District: Arshaq
- Rural District: Arshaq-e Markazi

Population (2016)
  - Total: 9
- Time zone: UTC+3:30 (IRST)

Agh Bolagh-e Sofla (Persian: اغ بلاغ سفلي) (Note: Also romanized as Āgh Bolāgh-e Soflá; also known as Āgh Bolāgh-e Pā’īn and Āq Bolāgh-e Pā’īn) is a village in Arshaq-e Markazi Rural District of Arshaq District in Meshgin Shahr County, Ardabil province, Iran.

== Demographics ==
=== Population ===
At the time of the 2006 National Census, the village's population was 54 in 11 households. The following census in 2011 counted 21 people in six households. The 2016 census measured the population of the village as nine people in four households.
