= Keleh Daraq =

Village in Ardabil province, Iran

Keleh Daraq Persian: كله درق
- Village
- Location within Iran
- Coordinates: 38°51′19″N 47°36′42″E
- Country: Iran
- Province: Ardabil
- County: Meshgin Shahr
- District: Moradlu
- Rural District: Salavat

Population (2016)
  - Total: 54
- Time zone: UTC+3:30 (IRST)

Keleh Daraq (Persian: كله درق) is a village in Salavat Rural District of Moradlu District in Meshgin Shahr County, Ardabil province, Iran.

== Demographics ==
=== Population ===
At the time of the 2006 National Census, the village's population was 55 in 14 households. The following census in 2011 counted 51 people in 15 households. The 2016 census measured the population of the village as 54 people in 13 households.
