= Rahim Beyglui-ye Olya =

Village in Ardabil province, Iran

Rahim Beyglui-ye Olya Persian: رحيم بيگلوي عليا
- Village
- Location within Iran
- Coordinates: 38°39′25″N 48°07′15″E
- Country: Iran
- Province: Ardabil
- County: Meshgin Shahr
- District: Arshaq
- Rural District: Arshaq-e Markazi

Population (2016)
  - Total: 76
- Time zone: UTC+3:30 (IRST)

Rahim Beyglui-ye Olya (Persian: رحيم بيگلوي عليا) (Note: Also romanized as Raḩīm Beyglūī-ye ‘Olyā; also known as Raḩīm Beyglū-ye Bālā) is a village in Arshaq-e Markazi Rural District of Arshaq District in Meshgin Shahr County, Ardabil province, Iran.

== Demographics ==
=== Population ===
At the time of the 2006 National Census, the village's population was 101 in 26 households. The following census in 2011 counted 74 people in 23 households. The 2016 census measured the population of the village as 76 people in 26 households.
