= Sheykh Mohammadlu =

Village in Ardabil province, Iran

Sheykh Mohammadlu Persian: شيخ محمدلو
- Village
- Location within Iran
- Coordinates: 38°37′02″N 47°52′18″E
- Country: Iran
- Province: Ardabil
- County: Meshgin Shahr
- District: Moradlu
- Rural District: Arshaq-e Gharbi

Population (2016)
  - Total: 165
- Time zone: UTC+3:30 (IRST)

Sheykh Mohammadlu (Persian: شيخ محمدلو) (Note: Also romanized as Sheykh Moḩammadlū; also known as Sheykh Moḩammad) is a village in Arshaq-e Gharbi Rural District of Moradlu District in Meshgin Shahr County, Ardabil province, Iran.

== Demographics ==
=== Population ===
At the time of the 2006 National Census, the village's population was 238 in 58 households. The following census in 2011 counted 195 people in 52 households. The 2016 census measured the population of the village as 165 people in 49 households.
