= Karamlu, Ardabil =

Village in Ardabil province, Iran

Karamlu Persian: كرملو
- Village
- Location within Iran
- Coordinates: 38°37′44″N 48°07′58″E
- Country: Iran
- Province: Ardabil
- County: Meshgin Shahr
- District: Arshaq
- Rural District: Arshaq-e Markazi

Population (2016)
  - Total: 370
- Time zone: UTC+3:30 (IRST)

Karamlu (Persian: كرملو) (Note: Also romanized as Karamlū; also known as Karam Chalkī, Karam Shāhlū, and Karamshakli) is a village in Arshaq-e Markazi Rural District of Arshaq District in Meshgin Shahr County, Ardabil province, Iran.

== Demographics ==
=== Population ===
At the time of the 2006 National Census, the village's population was 410 in 99 households. The following census in 2011 counted 361 people in 109 households. The 2016 census measured the population of the village as 370 people in 132 households.
