= Mollalu, Meshgin Shahr =

Village in Ardabil province, Iran

Mollalu Persian: ملالو
- Village
- Location within Iran
- Coordinates: 38°45′35″N 47°46′13″E
- Country: Iran
- Province: Ardabil
- County: Meshgin Shahr
- District: Moradlu
- Rural District: Arshaq-e Gharbi

Population (2016)
  - Total: 44
- Time zone: UTC+3:30 (IRST)

Mollalu (Persian: ملالو) (Note: Also romanized as Mollālū) is a village in Arshaq-e Gharbi Rural District of Moradlu District in Meshgin Shahr County, Ardabil province, Iran.

== Demographics ==
=== Population ===
At the time of the 2006 National Census, the village's population was 92 in 15 households. The following census in 2011 counted 71 people in 20 households. The 2016 census measured the population of the village as 44 people in 16 households.
