= Khordeh Qeshlaq, Ardabil =

Village in Ardabil province, Iran

Khordeh Qeshlaq Persian: خرده قشلاق
- Village
- Location within Iran
- Country: Iran
- Province: Ardabil
- County: Meshgin Shahr
- District: Moradlu
- Rural District: Yaft

Population (2016)
  - Total: 0
- Time zone: UTC+3:30 (IRST)

Khordeh Qeshlaq (Persian: خرده قشلاق) (Note: Also romanized as Khordeh Qeshlāq) is a village in Yaft Rural District of Moradlu District in Meshgin Shahr County, Ardabil province, Iran.

== Demographics ==
=== Population ===
At the time of the 2006 National Census, the village's population was 21 in five households. The following census in 2011 counted 26 people in six households. The 2016 census measured the population of the village as zero.
