= Keleh =

Keleh (Persian: كله) may refer to:

- Keleh, Kurdistan
- Keleh Daraq
- Keleh Sepyan
