= Aqa Beyglu, Ardabil =

Village in Ardabil province, Iran

Aqa Beyglu Persian: اقابيگلو
- Village
- Location within Iran
- Coordinates: 38°46′16″N 48°00′36″E
- Country: Iran
- Province: Ardabil
- County: Meshgin Shahr
- District: Arshaq
- Rural District: Arshaq-e Markazi

Population (2016)
  - Total: 49
- Time zone: UTC+3:30 (IRST)

Aqa Beyglu (Persian: اقابيگلو) (Note: Also romanized as Āqā Beyglū) is a village in Arshaq-e Markazi Rural District of Arshaq District in Meshgin Shahr County, Ardabil province, Iran.

== Demographics ==
=== Population ===
At the time of the 2006 National Census, the village's population was 68 in 12 households. The following census in 2011 counted 58 people in 17 households. The 2016 census measured the population of the village as 49 people in 15 households.
