= Tumar Darrehsi-ye Sofla =

Village in Ardabil province, Iran

Tumar Darrehsi-ye Sofla Persian: طوماردره سي سفلي
- Village
- Location within Iran
- Coordinates: 38°45′36″N 47°48′49″E
- Country: Iran
- Province: Ardabil
- County: Meshgin Shahr
- District: Moradlu
- Rural District: Arshaq-e Gharbi

Population (2016)
  - Total: 49
- Time zone: UTC+3:30 (IRST)

Tumar Darrehsi-ye Sofla (Persian: طوماردره سي سفلي) (Note: Also romanized as Tumar Darrahsi-ye Sofla and Ţūmār Darrahsī-ye Soflá; also known as Tūmār Darrehsī-ye Pā'īn) is a village in Arshaq-e Gharbi Rural District of Moradlu District in Meshgin Shahr County, Ardabil province, Iran.

== Demographics ==
=== Population ===
At the time of the 2006 National Census, the village's population was 54 in 10 households. The following census in 2011 counted 43 people in 11 households. The 2016 census measured the population of the village as 49 people in 16 households.
