= Qasem Kandi, Meshgin Shahr =

Village in Ardabil province, Iran

Qasem Kandi Persian: قاسم كندي
- Village
- Location within Iran
- Coordinates: 38°43′49″N 48°10′44″E
- Country: Iran
- Province: Ardabil
- County: Meshgin Shahr
- District: Arshaq
- Rural District: Arshaq-e Markazi

Population (2016)
  - Total: 12
- Time zone: UTC+3:30 (IRST)

Qasem Kandi (Persian: قاسم كندي) (Note: Also romanized as Qāsem Kandī) is a village in Arshaq-e Markazi Rural District of Arshaq District in Meshgin Shahr County, Ardabil province, Iran.

== Demographics ==
=== Population ===
At the time of the 2006 National Census, the village's population was 24 in five households. The following census in 2011 counted 21 people in five households. The 2016 census measured the population of the village as 12 people in five households.
