= Nasir Kandi, Arshaq =

Village in Ardabil province, Iran

Nasir Kandi Persian: نصيركندي
- Village
- Location within Iran
- Coordinates: 38°38′41″N 47°59′47″E
- Country: Iran
- Province: Ardabil
- County: Meshgin Shahr
- District: Arshaq
- Rural District: Arshaq-e Markazi

Population (2016)
  - Total: 18
- Time zone: UTC+3:30 (IRST)

Nasir Kandi (Persian: نصيركندي) (Note: Also romanized as Naşīr Kandī) is a village in Arshaq-e Markazi Rural District of Arshaq District in Meshgin Shahr County, Ardabil province, Iran.

== Demographics ==
=== Population ===
At the time of the 2006 National Census, the village's population was 30 in 10 households. The following census in 2011 counted 35 people in 10 households. The 2016 census measured the population of the village as 18 people in six households.
