= Goli Daraq-e Olya =

Village in Ardabil province, Iran

Goli Daraq-e Olya Persian: گلي درق عليا
- Village
- Location within Iran
- Coordinates: 38°49′44″N 47°41′52″E
- Country: Iran
- Province: Ardabil
- County: Meshgin Shahr
- District: Moradlu
- Rural District: Salavat

Population (2016)
  - Total: Below reporting threshold
- Time zone: UTC+3:30 (IRST)

Goli Daraq-e Olya (Persian: گلي درق عليا) (Note: Also romanized as Golī Daraq-e ‘Olyā; also known as Golī Darreh-ye Bālā) is a village in Salavat Rural District of Moradlu District in Meshgin Shahr County, Ardabil province, Iran.

== Demographics ==
=== Population ===
At the time of the 2006 National Census, the village's population was 22 in four households. The following census in 2011 counted 22 people in five households. The 2016 census measured the population of the village as below the reporting threshold.
