= Cher Cher =

Cher Cher or Chercher or Char Char (Persian: چرچر) may refer to:

- Cher Cher, Ardabil
- Chercher, East Azerbaijan
