= Cher Cher, Ardabil =

Village in Ardabil province, Iran

Cher Cher Persian: چرچر
- Village
- Location within Iran
- Coordinates: 38°44′00″N 47°38′05″E
- Country: Iran
- Province: Ardabil
- County: Meshgin Shahr
- District: Moradlu
- Rural District: Arshaq-e Gharbi

Population (2016)
  - Total: 15
- Time zone: UTC+3:30 (IRST)

Cher Cher (Persian: چرچر) (Note: Also known as Chīr Chīr) is a village in Arshaq-e Gharbi Rural District of Moradlu District in Meshgin Shahr County, Ardabil province, Iran.

== Demographics ==
=== Population ===
At the time of the 2006 National Census, the village's population was 51 in 12 households. The following census in 2011 counted 37 people in 11 households. The 2016 census measured the population of the village as 15 people in five households.
