= Borjelu, Meshgin Shahr =

Village in Ardabil province, Iran

Borjelu Persian: برجلو
- Village
- Location within Iran
- Coordinates: 38°39′45″N 47°37′26″E
- Country: Iran
- Province: Ardabil
- County: Meshgin Shahr
- District: Moradlu
- Rural District: Yaft

Population (2016)
  - Total: 121
- Time zone: UTC+3:30 (IRST)

Borjelu (Persian: برجلو) (Note: Also romanized as Borjelū) is a village in Yaft Rural District of Moradlu District in Meshgin Shahr County, Ardabil province, Iran.

== Demographics ==
=== Population ===
At the time of the 2006 National Census, the village's population was 200 in 43 households. The following census in 2011 counted 160 people in 41 households. The 2016 census measured the population of the village as 121 people in 36 households.
