= Yaft =

Yaft (Persian: يافت) may refer to:

- Yaft Rural District, in Ardabil Province, Iran
- Laft, in Hormozgan Province, Iran
