= Rahim Beyglui-ye Sofla =

Village in Ardabil province, Iran

Rahim Beyglui-ye Sofla Persian: رحيم بيگلوي سفلي
- Village
- Location within Iran
- Country: Iran
- Province: Ardabil
- County: Meshgin Shahr
- District: Arshaq
- Rural District: Arshaq-e Markazi

Population (2016)
  - Total: 376
- Time zone: UTC+3:30 (IRST)

Rahim Beyglui-ye Sofla (Persian: رحيم بيگلوي سفلي) (Note: Also romanized as Raḩīm Beyglūī-ye Soflá; also known as Raḩīm Beyglū-ye Pā’īn (رحيم بيگلوي پائين)) is a village in Arshaq-e Markazi Rural District of Arshaq District in Meshgin Shahr County, Ardabil province, Iran.

== Demographics ==
=== Population ===
At the time of the 2006 National Census, the village's population was 378 in 80 households. The following census in 2011 counted 386 people in 98 households. The 2016 census measured the population of the village as 376 people in 107 households. It was the most populous village in its rural district.
