= Tumar Darrehsi-ye Olya =

Village in Ardabil province, Iran

Tumar Darrehsi-ye Olya Persian: طوماردره سي عليا
- Village
- Location within Iran
- Coordinates: 38°45′37″N 47°48′25″E
- Country: Iran
- Province: Ardabil
- County: Meshgin Shahr
- District: Moradlu
- Rural District: Arshaq-e Gharbi

Population (2016)
  - Total: 18
- Time zone: UTC+3:30 (IRST)

Tumar Darrehsi-ye Olya (Persian: طوماردره سي عليا) (Note: Also romanized as Tumar Darrahsi-ye Olya and Ţūmār Darrahsī-ye ‘Olyā; also known as Tūmār Darrehsī-ye Bālā) is a village in Arshaq-e Gharbi Rural District of Moradlu District in Meshgin Shahr County, Ardabil province, Iran.

== Demographics ==
=== Population ===
At the time of the 2006 National Census, the village's population was 27 in six households. The following census in 2011 counted 21 people in five households. The 2016 census measured the population of the village as 18 people in five households.
