= Qoli Beyglu =

Qoli Beyglu (Persian: قلي بيگلو) may refer to:

- Qoli Beyglu, Ardabil
- Qoli Beyglu, East Azerbaijan
