= Nasir Kandi, Moradlu =

Village in Ardabil province, Iran

Nasir Kandi Persian: نصيركندي
- Village
- Location within Iran
- Coordinates: 38°49′37″N 47°46′50″E
- Country: Iran
- Province: Ardabil
- County: Meshgin Shahr
- District: Moradlu
- Rural District: Salavat

Population (2016)
  - Total: 23
- Time zone: UTC+3:30 (IRST)

Nasir Kandi (Persian: نصيركندي) (Note: Also romanized as Naşīr Kandī) is a village in Salavat Rural District of Moradlu District in Meshgin Shahr County, Ardabil province, Iran.

== Demographics ==
=== Population ===
At the time of the 2006 National Census, the village's population was 61 in 14 households. The following census in 2011 counted 39 people in 13 households. The 2016 census measured the population of the village as 23 people in seven households.
