= Abbas Qeshlaqi =

Village in Ardabil province, Iran

Abbas Qeshlaqi Persian: عباس قشلاقي
- Village
- Location within Iran
- Coordinates: 38°38′26″N 47°36′29″E
- Country: Iran
- Province: Ardabil
- County: Meshgin Shahr
- District: Moradlu
- Rural District: Arshaq-e Gharbi

Population (2016)
  - Total: 70
- Time zone: UTC+3:30 (IRST)

Abbas Qeshlaqi (Persian: عباس قشلاقي) (Note: Also romanized as ʿAbbās Qeshlāqī; also known as Moḩammadābād, Nūr Kandī and Nūrī Kandī) is a village in Arshaq-e Gharbi Rural District of Moradlu District in Meshgin Shahr County, Ardabil province, Iran.

== Demographics ==
=== Population ===
At the time of the 2006 National Census, the village's population was 221 in 34 households. The following census in 2011 counted 143 people in 30 households. The 2016 census measured the population of the village as 70 people in 19 households.
