= Aqa Beyglu =

Aqa Beyglu (Persian: اقابيگلو) may refer to:

- Aqa Beyglu, Ardabil
- Aqa Beyglu, West Azerbaijan
