= Borjelu =

Borjelu or Borjlu (Persian: برجلو) may refer to:

- Borjelu, Meshgin Shahr
- Borjelu, Nir
