= Mahmudabad, Meshgin Shahr =

Village in Ardabil province, Iran

Mahmudabad Persian: محموداباد
- Village
- Location within Iran
- Coordinates: 38°35′59″N 47°43′41″E
- Country: Iran
- Province: Ardabil
- County: Meshgin Shahr
- District: Moradlu
- Rural District: Arshaq-e Gharbi

Population (2016)
  - Total: 80
- Time zone: UTC+3:30 (IRST)

Mahmudabad (Persian: محموداباد) (Note: Also romanized as Maḩmūdābād; also known as Nūrī Kandī) is a village in Arshaq-e Gharbi Rural District of Moradlu District in Meshgin Shahr County, Ardabil province, Iran.

== Demographics ==
=== Population ===
At the time of the 2006 National Census, the village's population was 166 in 42 households. The following census in 2011 counted 136 people in 32 households. The 2016 census measured the population of the village as 80 people in 24 households.
