= Aq Bolagh-e Pain =

Aq Bolagh-e Pain (Persian: اقبلاغ پائین) may refer to:

- Aq Bolagh-e Pain, Ardabil
- Aq Bolagh-e Pain, East Azerbaijan
- Aq Bolagh-e Pain, Zanjan

== See also ==
- Agh Bolagh-e Pain
