= Qoli Beyglu, Ardabil =

Village in Ardabil province, Iran

Qoli Beyglu Persian: قلي بيگلو
- Village
- Location within Iran
- Coordinates: 38°30′09″N 48°05′39″E
- Country: Iran
- Province: Ardabil
- County: Meshgin Shahr
- District: Arshaq
- Rural District: Arshaq-e Markazi

Population (2016)
  - Total: 158
- Time zone: UTC+3:30 (IRST)

Qoli Beyglu (Persian: قلي بيگلو) (Note: Also romanized as Qolī Beyglū) is a village in Arshaq-e Markazi Rural District of Arshaq District in Meshgin Shahr County, Ardabil province, Iran.

== Demographics ==
=== Population ===
At the time of the 2006 National Census, the village's population was 162 in 37 households. The following census in 2011 counted 96 people in 26 households. The 2016 census measured the population of the village as 158 people in 54 households.
