= Goli Daraq-e Sofla =

Village in Ardabil province, Iran

Goli Daraq-e Sofla Persian: گلي درق سفلي
- Village
- Location within Iran
- Coordinates: 38°50′36″N 47°43′31″E
- Country: Iran
- Province: Ardabil
- County: Meshgin Shahr
- District: Moradlu
- Rural District: Salavat

Population (2016)
  - Total: 27
- Time zone: UTC+3:30 (IRST)

Goli Daraq-e Sofla (Persian: گلي درق سفلي) (Note: Also romanized as Golī Daraq-e Soflá; also known as Gol Daraq, Golī Daraq, and Golī Daraq-e Pā’īn) is a village in Salavat Rural District of Moradlu District in Meshgin Shahr County, Ardabil province, Iran.

== Demographics ==
=== Population ===
At the time of the 2006 National Census, the village's population was 52 in eight households. The following census in 2011 counted 46 people in eight households. The 2016 census measured the population of the village as 27 people in nine households.
