= Moradlu, Meshgin Shahr =

City in Ardabil province, Iran

Moradlu Persian: مرادلو
- City
- Location within Iran
- Coordinates: 38°44′46″N 47°44′50″E
- Country: Iran
- Province: Ardabil
- County: Meshgin Shahr
- District: Moradlu
- Established as a city: 2010

Population (2016)
  - Total: 671
- Time zone: UTC+3:30 (IRST)

Moradlu (Persian: مرادلو) (Note: Also romanized as Morādlū) is a city in, and the capital of, Moradlu District in Meshgin Shahr County, Ardabil province, Iran. It also serves as the administrative center for Arshaq-e Gharbi Rural District.

== Demographics ==
=== Population ===
At the time of the 2006 National Census, Moradlu's population was 645 in 167 households, when it was a village in Arshaq-e Gharbi Rural District. The following census in 2011 counted 761 people in 173 households, by which time the village had been converted to the status of a city. The 2016 census measured the population of the city as 671 people in 218 households.
