= Salavat Rural District =

Rural district in Ardabil province, Iran

Salavat Rural District Persian: دهستان صلوات
- Rural District
- Location within Iran
- Coordinates: 38°50′N 47°41′E
- Country: Iran
- Province: Ardabil
- County: Meshgin Shahr
- District: Moradlu
- Established: 1990
- Capital: Salavat

Population (2016)
  - Total: 1,785
- Time zone: UTC+3:30 (IRST)

Salavat Rural District (Persian: دهستان صلوات) is in Moradlu District of Meshgin Shahr County, Ardabil province, Iran. Its capital is the village of Salavat.

== Demographics ==
=== Population ===
At the time of the 2006 National Census, the rural district's population was 2,516 in 544 households. There were 1,946 inhabitants in 499 households at the following census of 2011. The 2016 census measured the population of the rural district as 1,785 in 509 households. The most populous of its 18 villages was Salavat, with 694 people.

=== Other villages in the rural district ===
- Abbasali Kandi
- Dagh Kandi
- Dash Bolaq Kandi
- Dashli Daraq
- Eslam Kandi
- Goli Daraq-e Olya
- Goli Daraq-e Sofla
- Kandeh Kandi
- Keleh Daraq
- Mir Jafarlu
- Mir Qahremanlu
- Mirza Hasan Kandi
- Nasir Kandi
- Sardi
- Sari Qayah
