= Razey, Ardabil =

City in Ardabil province, Iran

Razey Persian: رضي
- City
- Location within Iran
- Coordinates: 38°37′44″N 48°05′39″E
- Country: Iran
- Province: Ardabil
- County: Meshgin Shahr
- District: Arshaq
- Established as a city: 1997

Population (2016)
  - Total: 1,581
- Time zone: UTC+3:30 (IRST)

Razey (Persian: رضي) (Note: Also romanized as Razei) is a city in, and the capital of, Arshaq District in Meshgin Shahr County, Ardabil province, Iran. It also serves as the administrative center for Arshaq-e Markazi Rural District. The village of Razey was converted to a city in 1997.

== Demographics ==
=== Population ===
At the time of the 2006 National Census, the city's population was 1,749 in 413 households. The following census in 2011 counted 1,617 people in 426 households. The 2016 census measured the population of the city as 1,581 people in 472 households.
