= Arshaq-e Markazi Rural District =

Rural district in Ardabil province, Iran

Arshaq-e Markazi Rural District Persian: دهستان ارشق مركزئ
- Rural District
- Location within Iran
- Coordinates: 38°41′N 48°06′E
- Country: Iran
- Province: Ardabil
- County: Meshgin Shahr
- District: Arshaq
- Established: 1987
- Capital: Razey

Population (2016)
  - Total: 4,478
- Time zone: UTC+3:30 (IRST)

Arshaq-e Markazi Rural District (Persian: دهستان ارشق مركزئ) is in Arshaq District of Meshgin Shahr County, Ardabil province, Iran. It is administered from the city of Razey.

== Demographics ==
=== Population ===
At the time of the 2006 National Census, the rural district's population was 5,215 in 1,111 households. There were 4,083 inhabitants in 1,045 households at the following census of 2011. The 2016 census measured the population of the rural district as 4,478 in 1,399 households. The most populous of its 59 villages was Rahim Beyglui-ye Sofla, with 376 people.

=== Other villages in the rural district ===
- Agh Bad-e Gaduk
- Agh Bolagh-e Olya
- Agh Bolagh-e Sofla
- Agh Davahlu-ye Olya
- Ali Shansuyi
- Alikaran
- Amir Kandi
- Aqa Beyglu
- Aqa Morad
- Asadabad
- At Tutan
- Balut Kandi
- Barak Chay
- Chanbalu Qeshlaq
- Chebenlu
- Chupan Qeshlaqi
- Dam Qoli
- Gachi Bolaghi-ye Olya
- Gachi Bolaghi-ye Sofla
- Haft Cheshmeh
- Hasanlu
- Heydarabad
- Hoseyn Khan Kandi
- Jabbarlu
- Karamlu
- Kazemlu
- Khalifehlu
- Kharabeh Razi
- Lengehbiz
- Mir Hoseynlu
- Mohammadlu
- Nasir Kandi
- Pir Alilu
- Post Kandi
- Qanlu Bolagh
- Qarahlu
- Qasem Kandi
- Qeshlaq-e Ali Shansuyi
- Qeshlaq-e Mohammad Qoli
- Qoli Beyglu
- Qurlu
- Rahim Beyglui-ye Olya
- Saadat Bolaghi
- Seyyed Beyglu
- Sobhanlu
- Sohrablu
- Taqcheh Dash
- Tarhamabad
- Zakilu
