= Yaft Rural District =

Rural district in Ardabil province, Iran

Yaft Rural District Persian: دهستان يافت
- Rural District
- Location within Iran
- Coordinates: 38°45′N 47°33′E
- Country: Iran
- Province: Ardabil
- County: Meshgin Shahr
- District: Moradlu
- Established: 1987
- Capital: Kanchubeh

Population (2016)
  - Total: 2,419
- Time zone: UTC+3:30 (IRST)

Yaft Rural District (Persian: دهستان يافت) is in Moradlu District of Meshgin Shahr County, Ardabil province, Iran. Its capital is the village of Kanchubeh.

== Demographics ==
=== Population ===
At the time of the 2006 National Census, the rural district's population was 3,493 in 544 households. There were 2,900 inhabitants in 710 households at the following census of 2011. The 2016 census measured the population of the rural district as 2,419 in 666 households. The most populous of its 14 villages was Mashiran, with 815 people.

=== Other villages in the rural district ===
- Akbar Kandi
- Borjelu
- Charchelu
- Dikdaraq
- Gerdeh Gol
- Haram
- Khordeh Qeshlaq
- Qarah Aghaj
- Qarah Aghaj Poshteh
- Viz Darreh

== In literature ==
The 14th-century author Hamdallah Mustawfi listed Yāft in his Nuzhat al-Qulub as a forested district comprising about 20 villages. He wrote that it had a warm climate, produced grain and some fruit, and was assessed at a tax value of 4,000 dinars.
