= Sadun Sheykh Mohammad =

Sadun Sheykh Mohammad سعدون شيخ محمد
- Village
- Location within Iran
- Coordinates: 31°13′41″N 48°19′56″E
- Country: Iran
- Province: Khuzestan
- County: Ahvaz
- Bakhsh: Central
- Rural District: Esmailiyeh

Population (2006)
  - Total: 95
- Time zone: UTC+3:30 (IRST)
  - Summer (DST): UTC+4:30 (IRDT)

Sadun Sheykh Mohammad (Persian: سعدون شيخ محمد, also Romanized as Sa’dūn Sheykh Moḩammad; also known as Shaikh Mohammad-e Yeké Sádoon, Sheykh Mohammad, and Sheykh Moḩammad-e Yek) is a village in Esmailiyeh Rural District, in the Central District of Ahvaz County, Khuzestan Province, Iran. At the 2006 census, its population was 95, in 17 families.
