= Arshaq-e Gharbi Rural District =

Rural district in Ardabil province, Iran

Arshaq-e Gharbi Rural District Persian: دهستان ارشق غربي
- Rural District
- Location within Iran
- Coordinates: 38°43′N 47°45′E
- Country: Iran
- Province: Ardabil
- County: Meshgin Shahr
- District: Moradlu
- Established: 1987
- Capital: Moradlu

Population (2016)
  - Total: 5,157
- Time zone: UTC+3:30 (IRST)

Arshaq-e Gharbi Rural District (Persian: دهستان ارشق غربي) is in Moradlu District of Meshgin Shahr County, Ardabil province, Iran. It is administered from the city of Moradlu.

== Demographics ==
=== Population ===
At the time of the 2006 National Census, the rural district's population was 7,741 in 1,692 households. There were 6,137 inhabitants in 1,575 households at the following census of 2011. The 2016 census measured the population of the rural district as 5,157 in 1,513 households. The most populous of its 51 villages was Qurt Tappeh, with 594 people.

=== Other villages in the rural district ===
- Abbas Qeshlaqi
- Alachiq Tappehsi
- Ali Kahrizi
- Chakhar Chamani
- Chakhmaq Chukhur
- Cher Cher
- Davahchi-ye Sofla
- Emaratlui-ye Olya
- Gadeh Kahriz
- Galasan Gurasan
- Genlujeh
- Gun Papaq-e Olya
- Guni Kandi
- Incheh
- Jebar Kandi
- Khani Babalu
- Khanom Alilu
- Koleh Digeh
- Mahmudabad
- Mazafa
- Mohamandust-e Olya
- Mollalu
- Niazqoli
- Ojaq Qoli Kandi
- Ordukhan Kandi
- Qarah Gol
- Qarah Valilu
- Qari Mazraehsi
- Quldur Kohli
- Shamsir
- Sheykh Mohammadlu
- Tak Bolagh-e Arshaq
- Talkan
- Tazeh Kand
- Tumar Darrehsi-ye Olya
- Tumar Darrehsi-ye Sofla
- Yusefkhan Kandi
- Zargar-e Goli Bolaghi
