= Nasir Kandi, Charuymaq =

Nasir Kandi نصيركندي
- Village
- Location within Iran
- Coordinates: 37°05′36″N 46°47′30″E
- Country: Iran
- Province: East Azerbaijan
- County: Charuymaq
- Bakhsh: Central
- Rural District: Quri Chay-ye Sharqi

Population (2006)
  - Total: 80
- Time zone: UTC+3:30 (IRST)
  - Summer (DST): UTC+4:30 (IRDT)

Nasir Kandi (Persian: نصيركندي, also Romanized as Naşīr Kandī; also known as 'Naşīrābād) is a village in Quri Chay-ye Sharqi Rural District, in the Central District of Charuymaq County, East Azerbaijan Province, Iran. At the 2006 census, its population was 80, in 15 families.
