= Qasem Kandi, East Azerbaijan =

Qasem Kandi قاسم كندي
- Village
- Location within Iran
- Coordinates: 39°00′29″N 47°07′21″E
- Country: Iran
- Province: East Azerbaijan
- County: Kaleybar
- Bakhsh: Central
- Rural District: Mulan

Population (2006)
  - Total: 52
- Time zone: UTC+3:30 (IRST)
  - Summer (DST): UTC+4:30 (IRDT)

Qasem Kandi (Persian: قاسم كندي, also Romanized as Qāsem Kandī) is a village in Mulan Rural District, in the Central District of Kaleybar County, East Azerbaijan Province, Iran. At the 2006 census, its population was 52, in 10 families.
