= Sheykh Mohammad, Khuzestan =

Sheykh Mohammad شيخ محمد
- Village
- Location within Iran
- Coordinates: 31°47′00″N 48°53′00″E
- Country: Iran
- Province: Khuzestan
- County: Shushtar
- Bakhsh: Central
- Rural District: Shahid Modarres

Population (2006)
  - Total: 47
- Time zone: UTC+3:30 (IRST)
  - Summer (DST): UTC+4:30 (IRDT)

Sheykh Mohammad (Persian: شيخ محمد, also Romanized as Sheykh Moḩammad and Shaikh Muhammad) is a village in Shahid Modarres Rural District, in the Central District of Shushtar County, Khuzestan Province, Iran. At the 2006 census, its population was 47, comprising 8 families.
