= Khordeh Qeshlaq, East Azerbaijan =

Khordeh Qeshlaq خرده قشلاق
- Village
- Location within Iran
- Coordinates: 38°37′05″N 47°33′00″E
- Country: Iran
- Province: East Azerbaijan
- County: Ahar
- Bakhsh: Central
- Rural District: Vargahan

Population (2006)
  - Total: 35
- Time zone: UTC+3:30 (IRST)
  - Summer (DST): UTC+4:30 (IRDT)

Khordeh Qeshlaq (Persian: خرده قشلاق, romanized: Khordeh Qeshlāq) is a village in Vargahan Rural District, in the Central District of Ahar County, East Azerbaijan Province, Iran. At the 2006 census, its population was 35, in 8 families.
