= Nasir Kandi, Maragheh =

Nasir Kandi نصيركندي
- Village
- Location within Iran
- Coordinates: 37°21′38″N 46°30′41″E
- Country: Iran
- Province: East Azerbaijan
- County: Maragheh
- Bakhsh: Saraju
- Rural District: Sarajuy-ye Sharqi

Population (2006)
  - Total: 227
- Time zone: UTC+3:30 (IRST)
  - Summer (DST): UTC+4:30 (IRDT)

Nasir Kandi (Persian: نصيركندي, also Romanized as Naşīr Kandī) is a village in Sarajuy-ye Sharqi Rural District, Saraju District, Maragheh County, East Azerbaijan Province, Iran. At the 2006 census, its population was 227, in 45 families.
