= Mollalu, Kaleybar =

Mollalu ملالو
- Village
- Location within Iran
- Coordinates: 39°06′01″N 47°16′32″E
- Country: Iran
- Province: East Azerbaijan
- County: Kaleybar
- Bakhsh: Abish Ahmad
- Rural District: Abish Ahmad

Population (2006)
  - Total: 135
- Time zone: UTC+3:30 (IRST)
  - Summer (DST): UTC+4:30 (IRDT)

Mollalu (Persian: ملالو, also Romanized as Mollālū; also known as Mollā ‘Alī) is a village in Abish Ahmad Rural District, Abish Ahmad District, Kaleybar County, East Azerbaijan Province, Iran. At the 2006 census, its population was 135, in 29 families.
