= Arshaq District =

District in Ardabil province, Iran

Arshaq District Persian: بخش ارشق
- District
- Location within Iran
- Coordinates: 38°41′N 48°03′E
- Country: Iran
- Province: Ardabil
- County: Meshgin Shahr
- Capital: Razey

Population (2016)
  - Total: 10,296
- Time zone: UTC+3:30 (IRST)

Arshaq District (Persian: بخش ارشق) is in Meshgin Shahr County, Ardabil province, Iran. Its capital is the city of Razey.

== Demographics ==
=== Population ===
At the time of the 2006 National Census, the district's population was 12,636 in 2,746 households. The following census in 2011 counted 10,364 people in 2,718 households. The 2016 census measured the population of the district as 10,296 inhabitants living in 3,226 households.

=== Administrative divisions ===
Arshaq District Population
Administrative Divisions	2006	2011	2016
Arshaq-e Markazi RD	5,215	4,083	4,478
Arshaq-e Shomali RD	5,672	4,664	4,237
Razey (city)	1,749	1,617	1,581
Total	12,636	10,364	10,296
RD = Rural District
