= Moradlu District =

District in Ardabil province, Iran

Moradlu District Persian: بخش مرادلو
- District
- Location within Iran
- Coordinates: 38°43′N 47°42′E
- Country: Iran
- Province: Ardabil
- County: Meshgin Shahr
- Established: 2001
- Capital: Moradlu

Population (2016)
  - Total: 10,032
- Time zone: UTC+3:30 (IRST)

Moradlu District (Persian: بخش مرادلو) is in Meshgin Shahr County, Ardabil province, Iran. Its capital is the city of Moradlu.

== History ==
The village of Moradlu was elevated to the status of a city in 2010.

== Demographics ==
=== Population ===
At the time of the 2006 National Census, the district's population was 13,750 in 2,973 households. The following census in 2011 counted 11,744 people in 2,957 households. The 2016 census measured the population of the district as 10,032 inhabitants living in 2,906 households.

=== Administrative divisions ===
Moradlu District Population
Administrative Divisions	2006	2011	2016
Arshaq-e Gharbi RD	7,741	6,137	5,157
Salavat RD	2,516	1,946	1,785
Yaft RD	3,493	2,900	2,419
Moradlu (city)		761	671
Total	13,750	11,744	10,032
RD = Rural District
