= Meshgin Shahr County =

County in Ardabil province, Iran

Meshgin Shahr County Persian: شهرستان مشگين شهر
- County
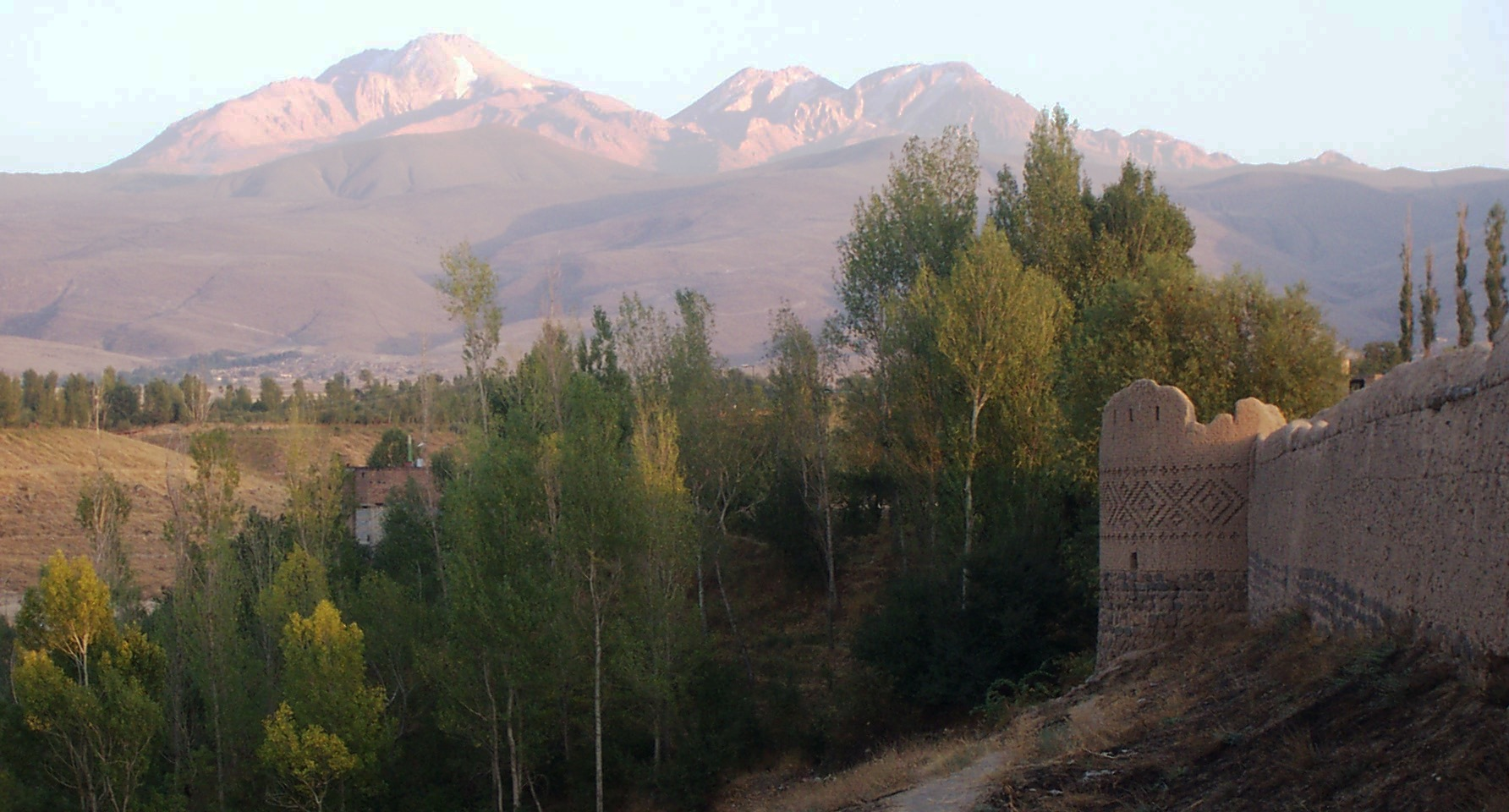
- Arshaq Castle with Mt. Sabalan

- Location of Meshgin Shahr County in Ardabil province (center, purple)

- Location of Ardabil province in Iran
- Coordinates: 38°33′N 47°43′E
- Country: Iran
- Province: Ardabil
- Capital: Meshginshahr
- Districts: Central, Arshaq, Meshgin-e Sharqi, Moradlu, Qosabeh

Area
  - Total: 3,825 km^{2} (1,477 sq mi)

Population (2016)
  - Total: 149,941
  - Density: 39.20/km^{2} (101.5/sq mi)
- Time zone: UTC+3:30 (IRST)

Meshgin Shahr County (Persian: شهرستان مشگين شهر) is in Ardabil province, Iran. Its capital is the city of Meshginshahr.

== History ==
Before the 20th century, Meshgin Shahr County had no urban center of any kind, the people having been mainly nomadic and tribal.

In 2007, the village of Fakhrabad was converted to a city, and the village of Moradlu rose to city status in 2010.

In 2012, Meshgin-e Gharbi and Shaban Rural Districts were separated from the Central District in the formation of Qosabeh District. At the same time, the village of Qosabeh became a city. The village of Alni also was transformed into a city in 2019.

== Demographics ==
=== Population ===
At the time of the 2006 census, the county's population was 156,141 in 36,470 households. The following census in 2011 counted 151,156 people in 40,954 households. The 2016 census measured the population of the county as 149,941 in 45,999 households.

=== Administrative divisions ===
Meshgin Shahr County's population history and administrative structure over three consecutive censuses are shown in the following table.

Meshgin Shahr County Population
| Administrative Divisions | 2006 | 2011 | 2016 |
|---|---|---|---|
| Central District | 112,128 | 114,726 | 107,557 |
| Dasht RD | 19,750 | 18,662 | 23,699 |
| Meshgin-e Gharbi RD | 15,277 | 14,185 | |
| Meshgin-e Sharqi RD | 10,335 | 10,624 | 9,749 |
| Shaban RD | 5,470 | 4,372 | |
| Alni (city) (Note: Became a city after the 2016 census) | | | |
| Meshginshahr (city) | 61,296 | 66,883 | 74,109 |
| Arshaq District | 12,636 | 10,364 | 10,296 |
| Arshaq-e Markazi RD | 5,215 | 4,083 | 4,478 |
| Arshaq-e Shomali RD | 5,672 | 4,664 | 4,237 |
| Razey (city) | 1,749 | 1,617 | 1,581 |
| Meshgin-e Sharqi District | 17,627 | 14,322 | 12,663 |
| Lahrud RD | 5,630 | 3,928 | 4,329 |
| Naqdi RD | 3,582 | 2,741 | 1,949 |
| Qarah Su RD | 5,454 | 3,956 | 3,237 |
| Fakhrabad (city) | | 1,114 | 999 |
| Lahrud (city) | 2,961 | 2,583 | 2,149 |
| Moradlu District | 13,750 | 11,744 | 10,032 |
| Arshaq-e Gharbi RD | 7,741 | 6,137 | 5,157 |
| Salavat RD | 2,516 | 1,946 | 1,785 |
| Yaft RD | 3,493 | 2,900 | 2,419 |
| Moradlu (city) | | 761 | 671 |
| Qosabeh District | | | 9,393 |
| Meshgin-e Gharbi RD | | | 3,904 |
| Shaban RD | | | 3,394 |
| Qosabeh (city) | | | 2,095 |
| Total | 156,141 | 151,156 | 149,941 |
RD = Rural District

== See also ==
Media related to Meshginshahr County at Wikimedia Commons
