= Satis =

SATIS or Station Area Traffic Improvement Scheme, is a traffic improvement project in Mumbai, India.

Satis or SATIS may also refer to:

- Satis (goddess) AKA Satet, the cult of deification of the floods of the Nile River in Egyptian mythology
- Satis (inhabited locality), name of several inhabited localities in Russia
- Satis (river), a river in Russia
- Satis House, a fictional estate in the Charles Dickens novel Great Expectations
- Renault Vel Satis, a French executive car
- Sports Association of Tasmanian Independent Schools (SATIS), a group of schools in Tasmania, Australia formed to conduct sporting competitions
- SATIS Expo, an annual Francophone trade show for broadcasters
- Satis (Wikt), a Latin phrase, often used in literary English, meaning "Enough!"

== See also ==
- Sati (disambiguation)
