= Monastery of Our Lady of Kazan (Tambov) =

Russian Orthodox monastery in Tambov, Russia

Coordinates: 52.7209°N 41.4595°E

- Казанский монастырь
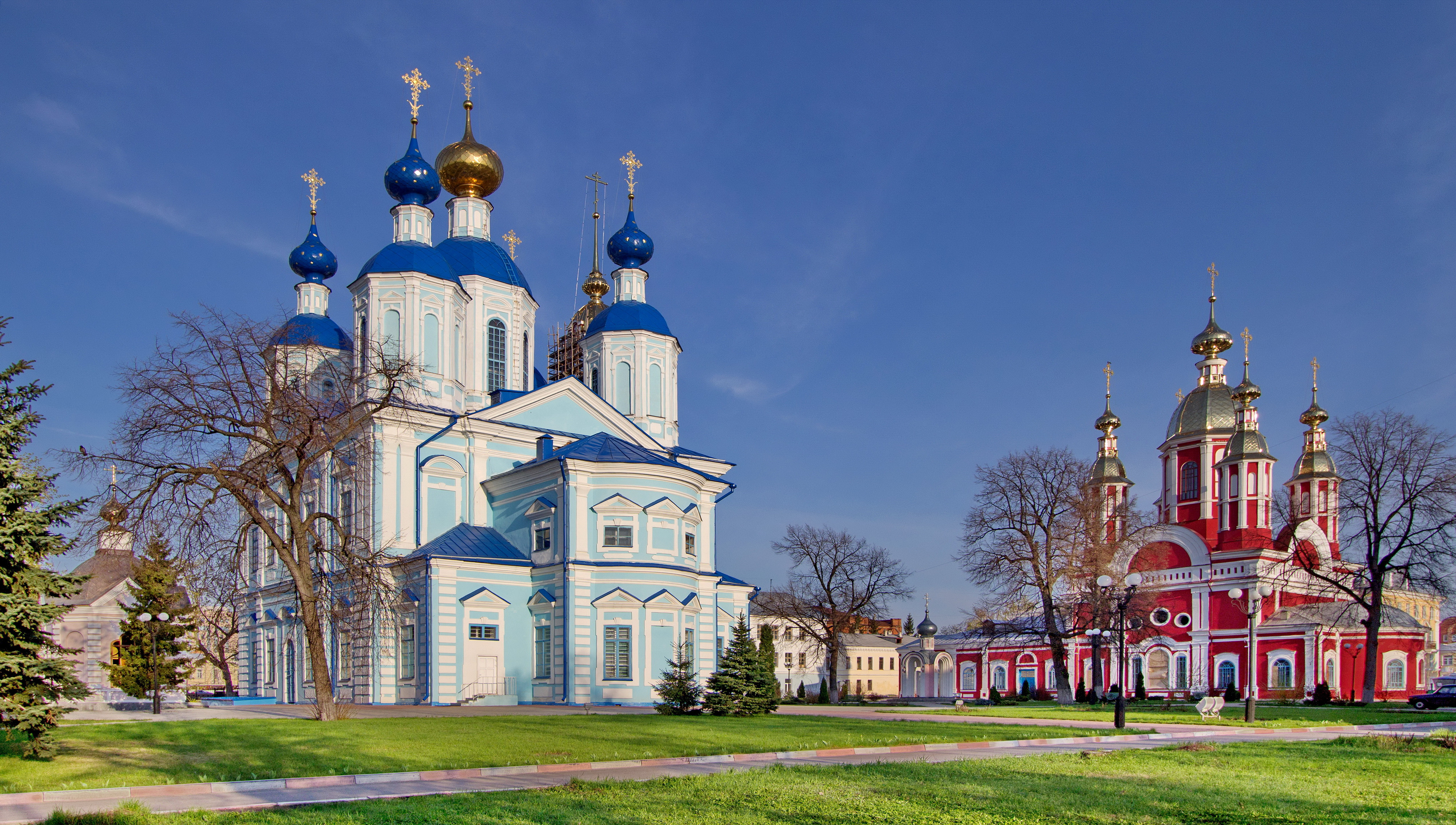
- Monastery in 2012
- Interactive map of Monastery of Our Lady of Kazan

Monastery information
- Established: 1667
- Mother house: Our Lady of Kazan
- Diocese: Tambov

Site
- Location: Tambov, Maxim Gorky Street, 3
- Country: Russia

The Monastery of Our Lady of Kazan (Russian: Казанский монастырь, Kazanskiy monastyr) is a Russian Orthodox monastery in Tambov, Russia. It is dedicated to the Theotokos of Kazan.

The monastery was founded in 1670. In 1758 it was declared the main residence of local bishops. The monastery was closed in 1918 after the Russian Revolution. In 1992 the monastery reopened and underwent renovation. The renovation was completed in 2007.

The main church was consecrated in 1796. A small chapel commemorating the victims of the Tambov Rebellion was unveiled by Alexios II in 1993.

The monastery has the tallest belltower in Central Russia, rising to a height of 107 meters. This Neoclassical campanile was built between 2009 and 2014 to replace a smaller structure demolished by the Communists.
