= Shacha (Ryazan Oblast) =

- Moksha basin map
- Native name: Шача (Russian)

Location
- Country: Russia

Physical characteristics
- Mouth: Tsna
  - coordinates: 53.9792°N 41.8835°E
- Length: 48 km (30 mi)
- Basin size: 449 km^{2} (173 sq mi)

Basin features
- Progression: Tsna→ Moksha→ Oka→ Volga→ Caspian Sea

The Shacha (Russian: Шача) is a small tributary of the Tsna in Ryazan Oblast, Russia. It is 48 kilometres (30 mi) long, and its drainage basin covers 449 square kilometres (173 mi^{2}). It has presented a hydrologic problem since the Globus-1 test, when it changed its course and threatened to flood the hole left by the explosion. This has the potential for spreading the nuclear pollution to the entire Volga region. Several engineers have proposed building a reinforced covering over the hole and digging a 12 km channel to shift the river away from the place of explosion. There is nearby town named Shatsk (Шацк).
