= Transfiguration Cathedral =

Transfiguration Cathedral or Cathedral of the Transfiguration may refer to:

== Canada ==
- Cathedral of the Transfiguration (Markham), Markham, Ontario, Canada

== Lithuania ==
- Transfiguration Cathedral, Kaišiadorys

== Romania ==
- Transfiguration Cathedral, Cluj-Napoca, Romania

== Russia ==
- Transfiguration Cathedral (Saint Petersburg)
- Transfiguration Cathedral (Tolyatti)
- Transfiguration Cathedral, Khabarovsk
- Transfiguration Cathedral, Novosibirsk
- Transfiguration Cathedral (Tambov)
- Transfiguration Cathedral, Pereslavl-Zalessky, a building of pre-Mongol Rus
- Transfiguration Cathedral, Rybinsk, one of the tallest church buildings in the world
- Transfiguration Cathedral (Yaroslavl), the katholikon of the Spaso-Preobrazhensky Monastery in Yaroslavl

== Spain ==
- Huesca Cathedral or the Holy Cathedral of the Transfiguration of the Lord, a Roman Catholic cathedral in Huesca, Spain

== Ukraine ==
- Transfiguration Cathedral, Chernihiv, a building of pre-Mongol Rus
- Transfiguration Cathedral, Dnipropetrovsk
- Transfiguration Cathedral in Odesa
- Transfiguration Cathedral, Vinnytsia

== United States ==
- Russian Orthodox Cathedral of the Transfiguration of Our Lord in New York City
- Cathedral Shrine of the Transfiguration, the cathedral of the Episcopal Diocese of Virginia, U.S.
