= Mysin =

Mysin (Russian: Мысин) is a Russian masculine surname, its feminine counterpart is Mysina. It may refer to

- Elisey Mysin (born 2010), Russian piano prodigy
- Maksim Mysin (born 1979), Russian football player
- Mikhail Mysin (born 1979), Russian football player
- Oksana Mysina (born 1961), Russian theatre, film and television actress
