= Shatsk, Russia =

Town in Ryazan Oblast, Russia

Shatsk Шацк
- Town

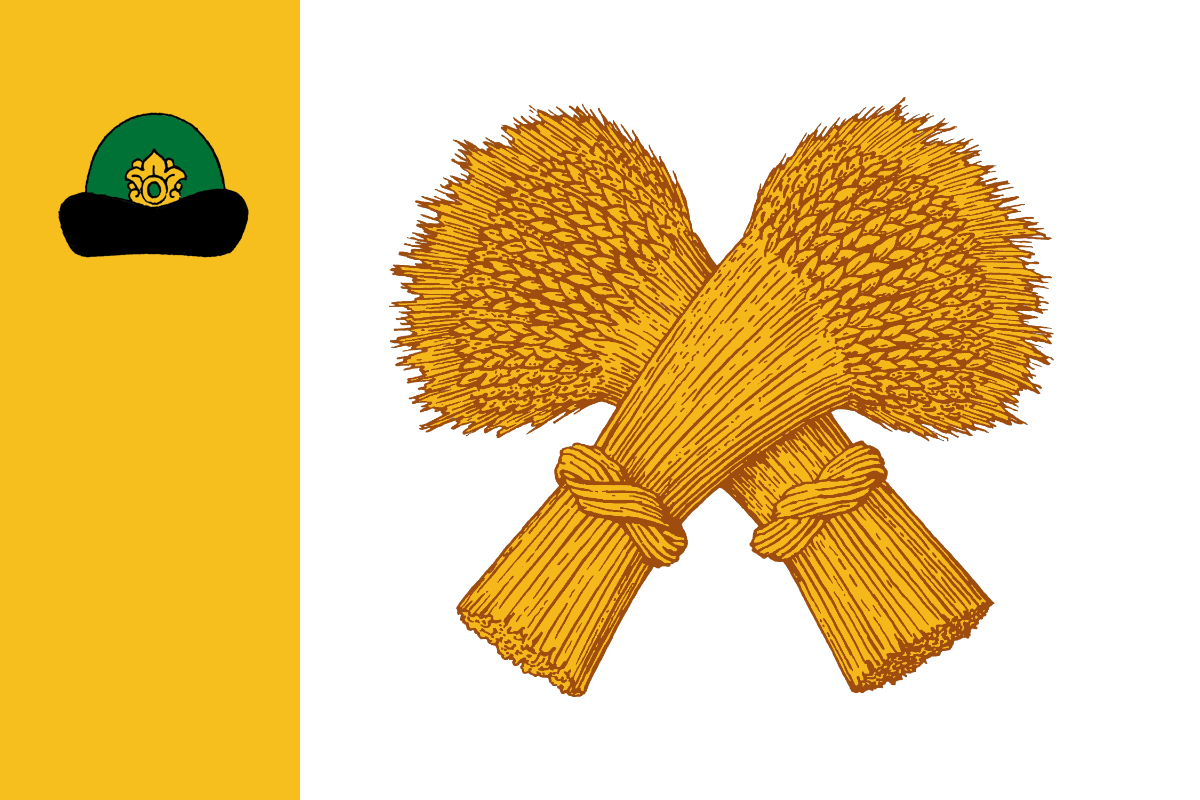
- Flag Coat of arms
- Interactive map of Shatsk
- Location of Shatsk Shatsk (Europe) Shatsk (Russia)
- Coordinates: 54°02′N 41°43′E
- Country: Russia
- Federal subject: Ryazan Oblast
- Administrative district: Shatsky District
- Town of district significanceSelsoviet: Shatsk
- Founded: 1553
- Town status since: 1779
- Elevation: 140 m (460 ft)

Population (2010 Census)
  - Total: 6,561
  - Estimate (2023): 5,791 (−11.7%)

Administrative status
  - Capital of: Shatsky District, town of district significance of Shatsk

Municipal status
  - Municipal district: Shatsky Municipal District
  - Urban settlement: Shatskoye Urban Settlement
  - Capital of: Shatsky Municipal District, Shatskoye Urban Settlement
- Time zone: UTC+3 (MSK)
- Postal codes: 391550, 391599
- OKTMO ID: 61656101001

Shatsk (Russian: Шацк) is a town and the administrative center of Shatsky District in Ryazan Oblast, Russia, located on the Shacha River (Tsna's tributary) 145 kilometers (90 mi) southeast of Ryazan, the administrative center of the oblast. Population: 6,561 (2010 census); 7,563 (2002 census); 8,181 (1989 Soviet census).

== History ==
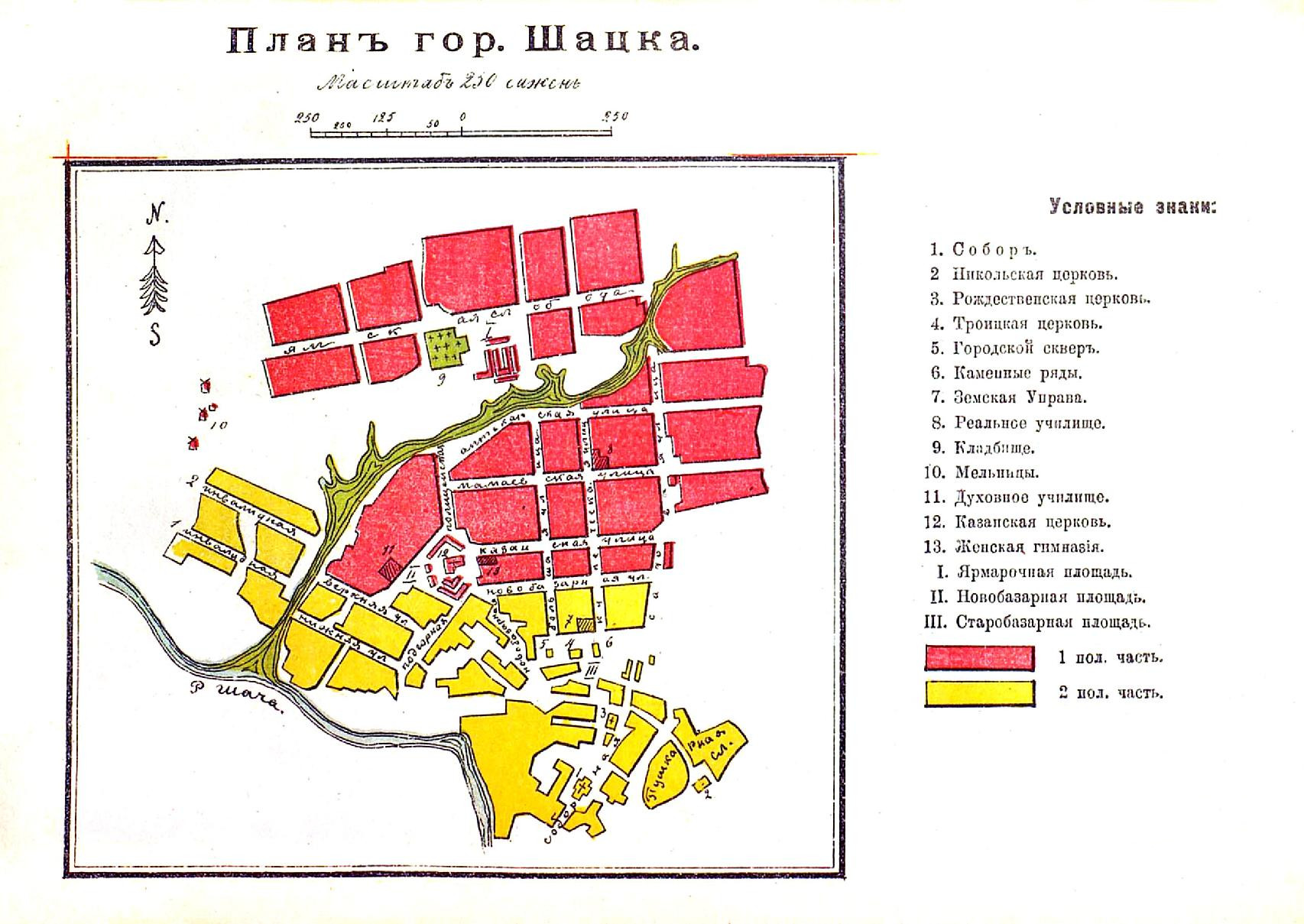
Shatsk map, 1914

In the 16th century, the so-called Shatsk Gates was a strip of open land through the forest useful for Tatar raids that the Russians had to fortify. Shatsk proper was founded in 1553 as a military outpost for defending the southern borders of the Grand Duchy of Moscow. It was granted town status by Catherine the Great in 1779.

== Administrative and municipal status ==
Within the framework of administrative divisions, Shatsk serves as the administrative center of Shatsky District. As an administrative division, it is incorporated within Shatsky District as the town of district significance of Shatsk. As a municipal division, the town of district significance of Shatsk is incorporated within Shatsky Municipal District as Shatskoye Urban Settlement.

== Economy ==
Town industries include vodka production and a meat packing plant.
