= Uvarovo =

Uvarovo (Russian: Уварово) is the name of several inhabited localities in Russia.

Urban localities

- Uvarovo, Tambov Oblast, a town in Tambov Oblast; administratively incorporated as a town of oblast significance

Rural localities

- Uvarovo, Chelyabinsk Oblast, a settlement in Novomirsky Selsoviet of Troitsky District of Chelyabinsk Oblast
- Uvarovo, Kaliningrad Oblast, a settlement in Chistoprudnensky Rural Okrug of Nesterovsky District of Kaliningrad Oblast
- Uvarovo, Kaluga Oblast, a village under the administrative jurisdiction of the City of Kaluga in Kaluga Oblast
- Uvarovo, Kostroma Oblast, a village in Baksheyevskoye Settlement of Kostromskoy District of Kostroma Oblast
- Uvarovo, Kurgan Oblast, a selo in Uvarovsky Selsoviet of Mokrousovsky District of Kurgan Oblast
- Uvarovo, Moscow, a village in Pervomayskoye Settlement of the federal city of Moscow
- Uvarovo, Domodedovo, Moscow Oblast, a village under the administrative jurisdiction of Domodedovo Town Under Oblast Jurisdiction in Moscow Oblast
- Uvarovo, Domodedovo, Moscow Oblast, a village under the administrative jurisdiction of the Domodedovo city under oblast jurisdiction, Moscow Oblast
- Uvarovo, Stupinsky District, Moscow Oblast, a village under the administrative jurisdiction of the work settlement of Zhilyovo in Stupinsky District of Moscow Oblast
- Uvarovo, Buturlinsky District, Nizhny Novgorod Oblast, a selo in Uvarovsky Selsoviet of Buturlinsky District of Nizhny Novgorod Oblast
- Uvarovo, Lyskovsky District, Nizhny Novgorod Oblast, a village in Kirikovsky Selsoviet of Lyskovsky District of Nizhny Novgorod Oblast
- Uvarovo, Penza Oblast, a selo in Uvarovsky Selsoviet of Issinsky District of Penza Oblast
- Uvarovo, Perm Krai, a village in Ochyorsky District of Perm Krai
- Uvarovo, Pskov Oblast, a village in Opochetsky District of Pskov Oblast
- Uvarovo, Krasninsky District, Smolensk Oblast, a village in Mankovskoye Rural Settlement of Krasninsky District of Smolensk Oblast
- Uvarovo, Safonovsky District, Smolensk Oblast, a village in Zimnitskoye Rural Settlement of Safonovsky District of Smolensk Oblast
- Uvarovo, Yelninsky District, Smolensk Oblast, a village in Korobetskoye Rural Settlement of Yelninsky District of Smolensk Oblast
- Uvarovo, Kesovogorsky District, Tver Oblast, a village in Yeliseyevskoye Rural Settlement of Kesovogorsky District of Tver Oblast
- Uvarovo, Toropetsky District, Tver Oblast, a village in Uvarovskoye Rural Settlement of Toropetsky District of Tver Oblast
- Uvarovo, Vladimir, Vladimir Oblast, a village under the administrative jurisdiction of the City of Vladimir in Vladimir Oblast
- Uvarovo, Sobinsky District, Vladimir Oblast, a village in Sobinsky District, Vladimir Oblast
- Uvarovo, Vologda Oblast, a village in Sizemsky Selsoviet of Sheksninsky District of Vologda Oblast
- Uvarovo, Lyubimsky District, Yaroslavl Oblast, a village in Voskresensky Rural Okrug of Lyubimsky District of Yaroslavl Oblast
- Uvarovo, Tutayevsky District, Yaroslavl Oblast, a village in Artemyevsky Rural Okrug of Tutayevsky District of Yaroslavl Oblast
