= Kotovsk, Russia =

Town in Tambov Oblast, Russia

Kotovsk Котовск
- Town
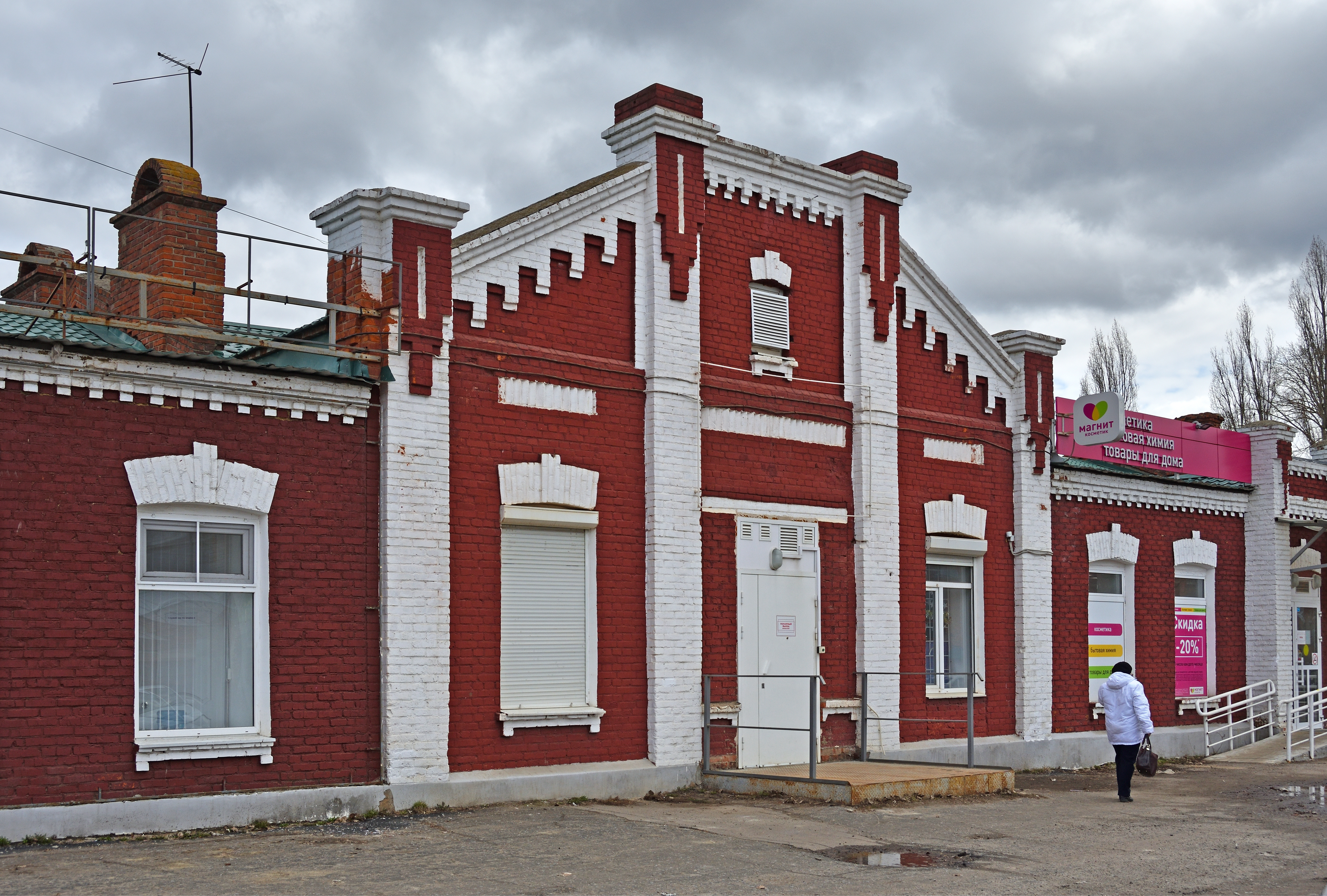

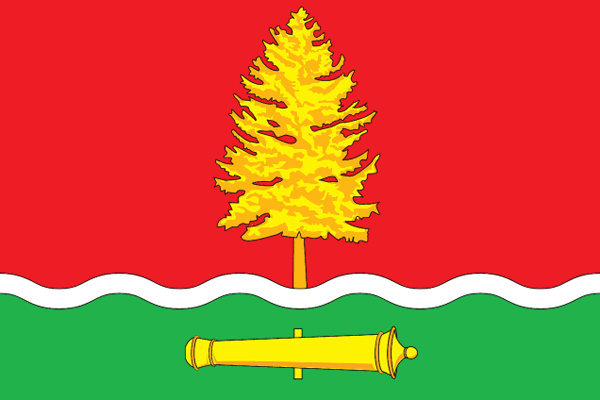
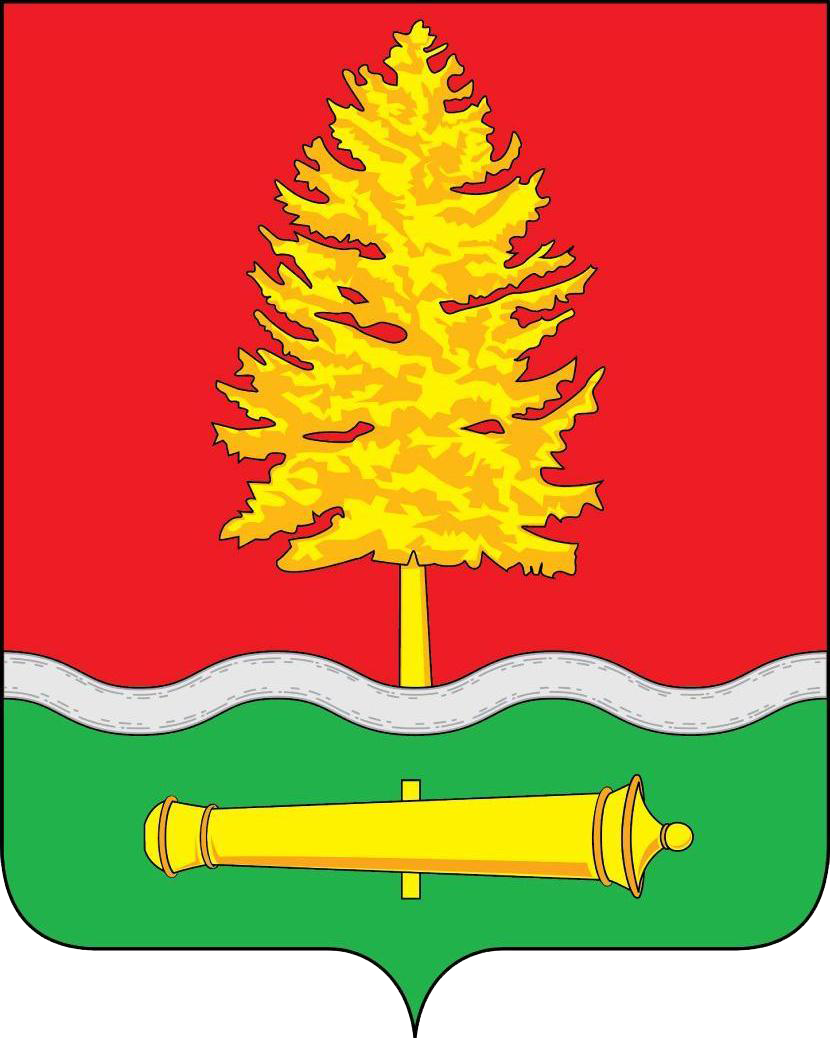
- Flag Coat of arms
- Interactive map of Kotovsk
- Location of Kotovsk Kotovsk (Tambov Oblast)
- Coordinates: 52°35′N 41°31′E
- Country: Russia
- Federal subject: Tambov Oblast
- Porokhovoy Zavod: 1914
- Town status since: 1940

Area
  - Total: 17.3 km^{2} (6.7 sq mi)
- Elevation: 130 m (430 ft)

Population (2010 Census)
  - Total: 31,850
  - Estimate (2025): 25,852 (−18.8%)
  - Density: 1,840/km^{2} (4,770/sq mi)

Administrative status
  - Subordinated to: town of oblast significance of Kotovsk
  - Capital of: town of oblast significance of Kotovsk

Municipal status
  - Urban okrug: Kotovsk Urban Okrug
  - Capital of: Kotovsk Urban Okrug
- Time zone: UTC+3 (MSK)
- Postal code: 393194
- Dialing code: +7 47541
- OKTMO ID: 68710000001

Kotovsk (Russian: Кото́вск) is a town in Tambov Oblast, Russia, located on the Tsna River 13 kilometers (8.1 mi) south of Tambov. Population: 31,850 (2010 census); 34,054 (2002 census); 38,510 (1989 Soviet census).

== History ==
Kotovsk was founded before World War I under the initiative of Tsar Nicholas II as a settlement for workers who were engaged in the construction of the gunpowder factory (commissioned in 1912). The settlement was initially called Porokhovoy Zavod (Порохово́й Заво́д, lit. gunpowder factory). It was later renamed Krasny Boyevik (Кра́сный Боеви́к, lit. red fighter), because it was used by the Bolsheviks as a lodgement for the establishment of the Soviet government in the region. In 1940, it was granted town status and renamed Kotovsk after Grigory Kotovsky (1881–1925), who had suppressed an anti-Soviet peasant rebellion in Tambov Governorate in 1921.

The railway station was closed till 2022, when it became available for passenger transportation again.

== Administrative and municipal status ==
Within the framework of administrative divisions, it is incorporated as the town of oblast significance of Kotovsk—an administrative unit with the status equal to that of the districts. As a municipal division, the town of oblast significance of Kotovsk is incorporated as Kotovsk Urban Okrug.

== Notable people ==
- Margarita Plavunova (1994–2019), athlete and artists' model
- Aleksandr Zyablov (born 1985), football player
