= Aleksandr Zyablov =

Russian footballer

Personal information
- Full name: Aleksandr Yevgenyevich Zyablov
- Date of birth: 10 July 1985 (age 41)
- Place of birth: Kotovsk, Tambov Oblast, Russian SFSR
- Height: 1.74 m (5 ft 8 1/2 in)
- Positions: Midfielder; forward

Senior career*
Years	Team	Apps	(Gls)
2004–2006	FC Spartak Tambov	69	(8)
2007–2008	FC Ryazan	22	(3)
2008–2009	FC Spartak Tambov	28	(3)
2010	FC Kotovsk (D4)		
2011–2013	FC Spartak Tambov	66	(5)
2013–2014	FC Lokomotiv Liski	25	(2)
2014	FC Vybor-Kurbatovo Voronezh	15	(4)
2015–2017	FC Tambov	32	(2)
- * Club domestic league appearances and goals

Aleksandr Yevgenyevich Zyablov (Russian: Александр Евгеньевич Зяблов; born 10 July 1985) is a former Russian professional football player.

== Club career ==
He played in the Russian Football National League for FC Tambov in 2016.
