= Diocese of Tambov =

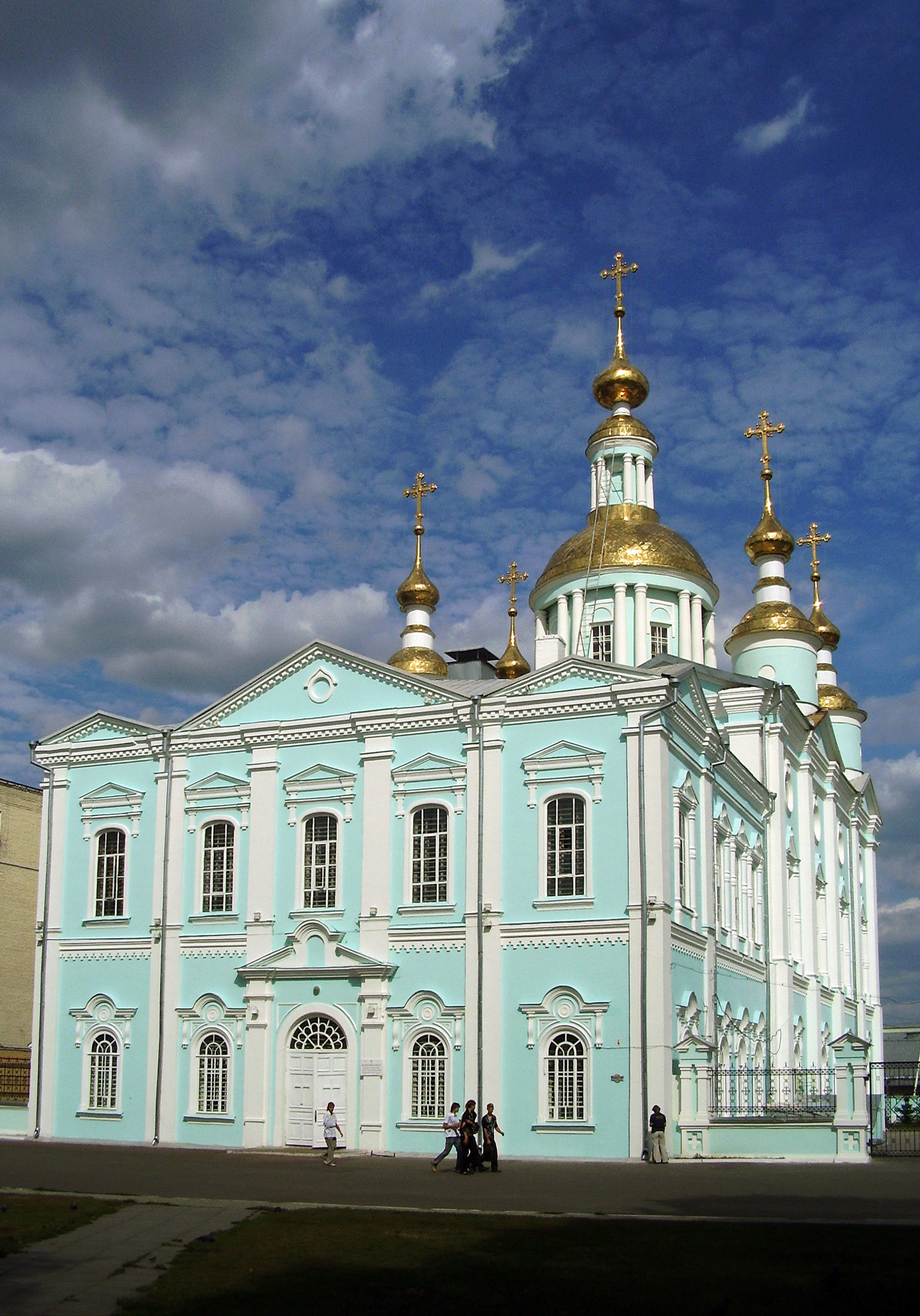
- Transfiguration Cathedral in Tambov, September 2007

Location
- Territory: Tambov Oblast
- Deaneries: 10
- Headquarters: Tambov

Information
- Denomination: Eastern Orthodox
- Sui iuris church: Russian Orthodox Church
- Established: 1682
- Cathedral: Transfiguration Cathedral
- Language: Old Church Slavonic

Current leadership
- Governance: Eparchy
- Bishop: Feodosiy (Vasnyev) since 26 December 2002

Website
- www.eparhia-tmb.ru

The Diocese of Tambov (Russian: Тамбовская епархия) is an eparchy of the Russian Orthodox Church. It combines parishes and monasteries in the Tambov Oblast. The main church is the Transfiguration Cathedral.

== History ==
The Tambov and Rasskazovskaya Diocese was founded in 1682 by decree of Tsar Feodor III and the Patriarch Joachim.

Originally, the diocese included the city of Tambov as well as Kozlov and Borisoglebsk.

In 1699, the diocese was closed and placed under the jurisdiction of the Ryazan diocese from 1720 - Voronezh diocese, and since 1723, the Moscow Synodal Office. Managing such a distant diocese through the Moscow Synod office was difficult, so again the question arose of placing a local bishop in charge. The Tambov and Rasskazovo Diocese was closed because the poor people of Tambov destroyed most of the facility.

In 1758, by decree of Empress Elizabeth, the diocese was restored. In addition to Tambov and Kozlov, the diocese included Dobry, Kerensky Narovchatov Upper and Lower Lomov and Troitsk. In 1764, the diocese added the city of Penza, Borisoglebsk and Mokshan. In 1779, the city added: Saransk, Morshansk, Kirsanov, Ranenburg, Serdobsk and Chembar. The final borders of the diocese were established in 1803. Since then, it has not come out of the administrative boundaries of the Tambov province, approved in 1796.

At the end of 1930, no active parish operated in Tambov. Restoring the diocese began in October 1943, when the first church was re-opened.

In 1958, there were 47 churches operating in the Tambov region. In the 1950s, the influence of religion on the lives of Tambov residents, despite the anti-church policies of the Soviet government, was very great. In the Tambov region in 1958, 22.3% of those born were baptized, 8.2% of married couples were married in church, 19.4% of the dead were buried according to church rites. In 1958, 132,825 adults and 11,025 children confessed in the Tambov region. Even Khrushchev’s anti-religious campaign could not significantly weaken the influence of religion on Tambovites, and the number of baptisms even increased in 1957-1964. In 1964, in the Tambov region, 53.6% of those born were baptized, 4.6% of couples were married in church, 24.5% of the dead were buried according to church rites. However, during the Khrushchev period, the number of churches in the region decreased noticeably. If in 1959 there were 47 churches operating in the Tambov region, then in 1964 there were only 40.

On December 26, 2012, by decision of the Holy Synod of the Russian Orthodox Church, Michurinskaya and Uvarovskaya were separated from the Tambov diocese; all three dioceses are included in the newly formed Tambov Metropolis.

In 2024, the diocese included three cathedrals, 73 churches, two chapels, three monasteries and one seminary.

== Bishops ==
- March 26, 1682 - July 1, 1684 - Leonty
- February 15, 1685 - July 28, 1698 - Pitirim
- November 21, 1698 - August 23, 1700 - Ignatius (Shangin)
- May 25, 1758 - November 9, 1766 - Pachomius (Simansky)
- November 9, 1766 - December 23, 1786 - Theodosius (Golosnitsky)
- May 6, 1788 - February 6, 1794 - Theophilus (Raev)
- February 26 - March 11, 1794 - Plato (Lyubarsky)
- March 11, 1794 - December 23, 1811 - Theophilus (Raev)
- March 29, 1812 - April 26, 1821 - Jonah (Vasilievsky)
- July 23, 1821 - May 20, 1824 - Theophylact (Shiryaev)
- August 5, 1824 - April 5, 1829 - Afanasy (Telyatev)
- June 9, 1829 - February 17, 1832 - Evgeny (Bazhenov)
- April 24, 1832 - April 5, 1841 - Arseny (Moskvin)
- April 27, 1841 - April 7, 1857 - Nikolai (Dobrokhotov)
- May 1, 1857 - April 18, 1859 - Macarius (Bulgakov)
- July 1, 1859 - July 22, 1863 - Feofan (Govorov)
- September 1, 1863 - June 13, 1873 - Feodosius (Shapovalenko)
- June 13, 1873 - September 9, 1876 - Palladium (Raev-Pisarev)
- September 9, 1876 - May 4, 1885 - Palladium (Gankevich)
- May 11, 1885 - June 3, 1890 - Vitaly (Iosifov)
- June 3, 1890 - April 30, 1894 - Jerome (Ekzemplyarsky)
- April 30, 1894 - July 12, 1898 - Alexander (Bogdanov)
- September 27, 1898 - April 27, 1902 - Georgy (Orlov)
- April 27, 1902 - February 8, 1903 - Dimitry (Kovalnitsky)
- February 8, 1903 - December 7, 1909 - Innokenty (Belyaev)
- December 30, 1909 - March 19, 1918 - Kirill (Smirnov)
- May 22, 1918 - 1927 - Zinovy (Drozdov)
- September 26, 1923 - 1924 - Dimitry (Dobroserdov) temporary, Bishop of Kozlovsky
- 1924-1926 - Stefan (Gnedovsky) v/u, Bishop of Kirsanovsky
- December 1926 - June 29, 1927 - Alexy (Bui) v/u, Bishop of Kozlovsky
- June 29, 1927 - January 28, 1928 - Seraphim (Meshcheryakov)
- April 9, 1930 - February 20, 1936 - Vassian (Pyatnitsky)
- February 20, 1936 - January 20, 1938 - Venedikt (Alentov)
- 1938-1941 - the position was vacant
- October 14, 1941 - no later than February 1942 - Alexy (Sergeev)
- December 8, 1943 - February 7, 1944 - Grigory (Chukov) v/u, Archbishop of Saratov
- February 7, 1944 - April 5, 1946 - Luka (Voino-Yasenetsky)
- April 9, 1946 - August 8, 1961 - Joasaph (Zhurmanov)
- March 29, 1961 - November 16, 1962 - Mikhail (Chub) until August 8, 1961
- November 16, 1962 - March 10, 1968 - Innokenty (Zelnitsky)
- March 15 - May 10, 1968 - Pimen (Izvekov) v/u, Metropolitan of Krutitsky
- May 10 - November 28, 1968 - Pitirim (Nechaev) v/u, Bishop of Volokolamsk
- November 28, 1968 - June 8, 1970 - Anthony (Krotevich)
- June 8, 1970 - October 11, 1972 - Jonathan (Kopolovich)
- October 18, 1972 - September 3, 1974 - Damascene (Bodry)
- September 3, 1974 - April 25, 1985 - Mikhail (Chub)
- June 26, 1985 - May 12, 1987 - Valentin (Mishchuk)
- May 31, 1987 - October 11, 2002 - Evgeniy (Zhdan)
- from December 26, 2002 - Feodosius (Vasnev)
