= Satis (inhabited locality) =

Satis (Russian: Сатис) is the name of several inhabited localities in Nizhny Novgorod Oblast, Russia.

Urban localities

- Satis, Pervomaysk, Nizhny Novgorod Oblast, a work settlement under the administrative jurisdiction of the town of oblast significance of Pervomaysk

Rural localities

- Satis, Diveyevsky District, Nizhny Novgorod Oblast, a settlement in Satissky Selsoviet of Diveyevsky District of Nizhny Novgorod Oblast
