= Satis (river) =

Satis (River)
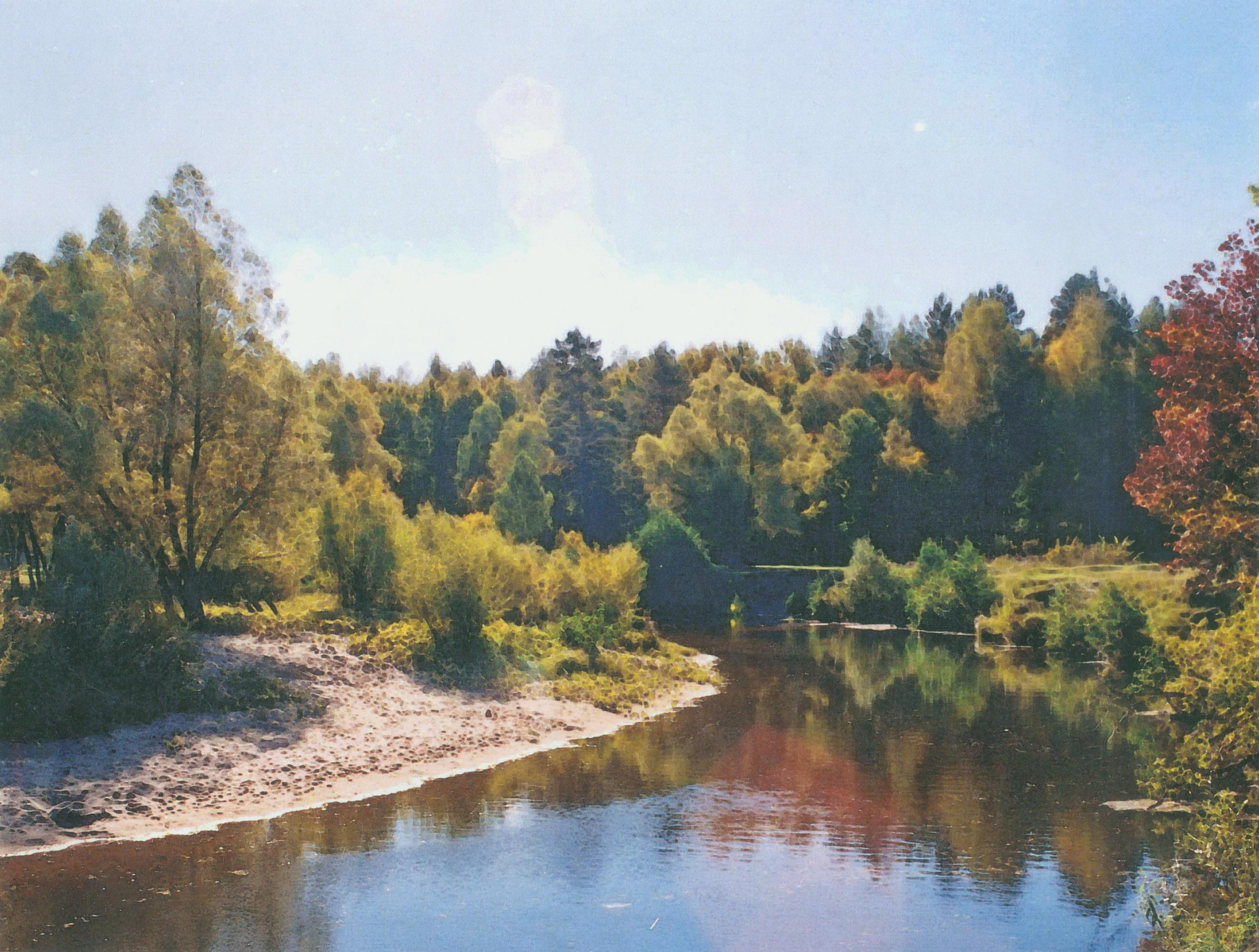
- Native name: Сатис (Russian)

Location
- Country: Russia
- Region: Nizhny Novgorod Oblast, Republic of Mordovia
- Cities: Satis, Pervomaysk, Nizhny Novgorod Oblast, Sarov

Physical characteristics
- Source
  - coordinates: 55°0′57″N 43°48′21″E
- Mouth: Moksha
  - coordinates: 54°46′32″N 43°1′29″E
- Length: 89 km (55 mi)
- Basin size: 1,570 km^{2} (610 sq mi)
- Width
  - minimum: 2 m
  - maximum: 20 m
- Depth
  - minimum: 0.3 m
  - maximum: 5 m

Basin features
- Progression: Moksha→ Oka→ Volga→ Caspian Sea

The Satis (Russian: Сатис) is a river in central Russia, a right tributary of the Moksha.

== Geography ==
The source of the river is 5 km northeast of Satis, Pervomaysk, Nizhny Novgorod Oblast. The river is 89 kilometres (55 mi) long, and has a drainage basin of 1,570 square kilometres (610 sq mi).

The width of the river is about 2–3 meters near the village of Satis (Pervomaisky District), which is a few kilometres from the source. The depth at this point is about 0.3 - 0.5m. The flow rate is about 0.8 m/s and the water remains clear.

The river bed has sediment of pebbles and sand and the shores are lined with trees. The nature of the terrain remains almost uniform until the city of Sarov.

The water is characterized by a fairly high content of sulphates and calcium salts. The soil is rich in limestone and limonite. The presence of the latter is manifested in the water's red hue after heavy rain.

The water is cold even on hot summer days owing to the many springs that feed it. The presence of underwater springs largely explains the river does not freeze during the winter period in some areas.

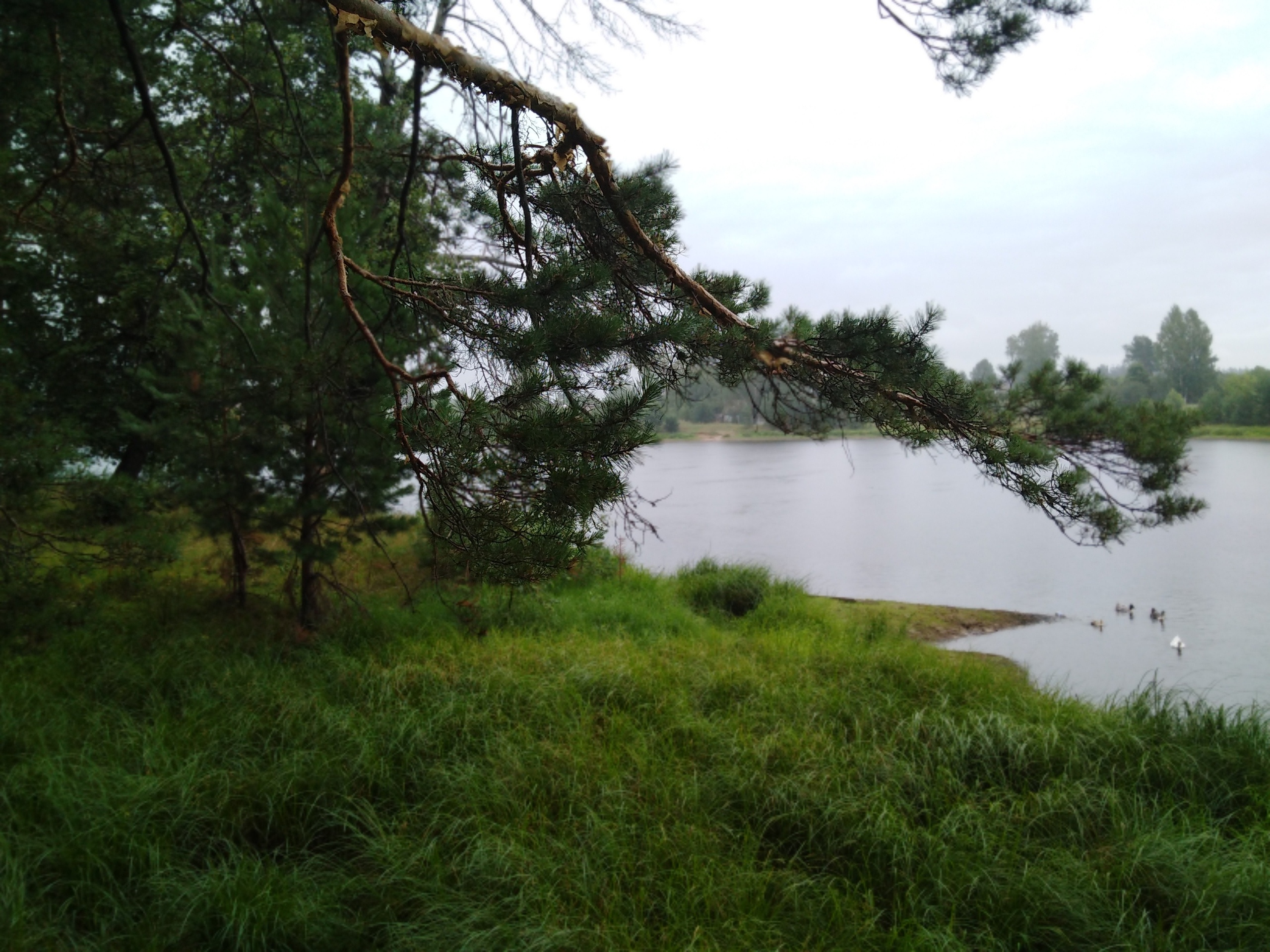
Geese on the river

== Fish ==
The ichthyofauna of the river is diverse. The following fish species inhabit the Satis, including its tributaries and other bodies of water in the river basin:

- Chub
- Minnow
- Ruff
- Dace
- Crucian Carp
- Crucian Carp Silver (Carassius Gibelio)
- Carp
- Rudd
- Bream
- Tench
- Burbot
- Minnow
- Roach
- Perch
- Chinese sleeper(rus. ротан)
- Bleak
- Loach
- Pike
- Amur Sleeper
- Orfe

Representatives of the ichthyofauna of Moksha are found in the lakes located on the territory of the Mordovia Reserve: Sheatfish, Pikeperch, etc.

In general, the dominant species are Roach, Gudgeon, Perch and Bleak - Oxyphilic species, which indicates favourable abiotic and biotic regimes.

The population of species that are sensitive to pollution, such as Gudgeon, Bleak, Chub, Ruff, and Dace has increased. This indicates the ecological recovery processes of the river are succeeding.
