= Margarita Plavunova =

Russian athlete and artists' model (1994–2019)

Personal information
- National team: Russia
- Born: 31 January 1994 Kotovsk, Russia
- Died: August 22, 2019 (aged 25) Morshansky District, Tamblov Oblast, Western Russia

Sport
- Sport: athletics
- Event(s): 100m, 60m hurdles
- Coached by: Elena Melnikova

Achievements and titles
- Personal best: 14.06 seconds – 100m hurdles

Margarita Plavunova (31 January 1994 – 22 August 2019) was a Russian athlete and artists' model.

She was born in Kotovsk in 1994 and was a graduate of the sports department at Tomsk State University. She competed in the national championships and became Russian student champion in the 60m hurdles and also competing in the 100m hurdles and 400m hurdles.

Plavunova died suddenly on 22 August 2019 beside a highway in the Morshansky District of the Tambov Oblast region of western Russia at the age of 25 while jogging. Preliminary post-mortem examination suggested acute heart failure.
