= Transfiguration Cathedral, Novosibirsk =

Coordinates: 55.0275°N 82.9283°E

Transfiguration Cathedral
- Собор Преображения Господня
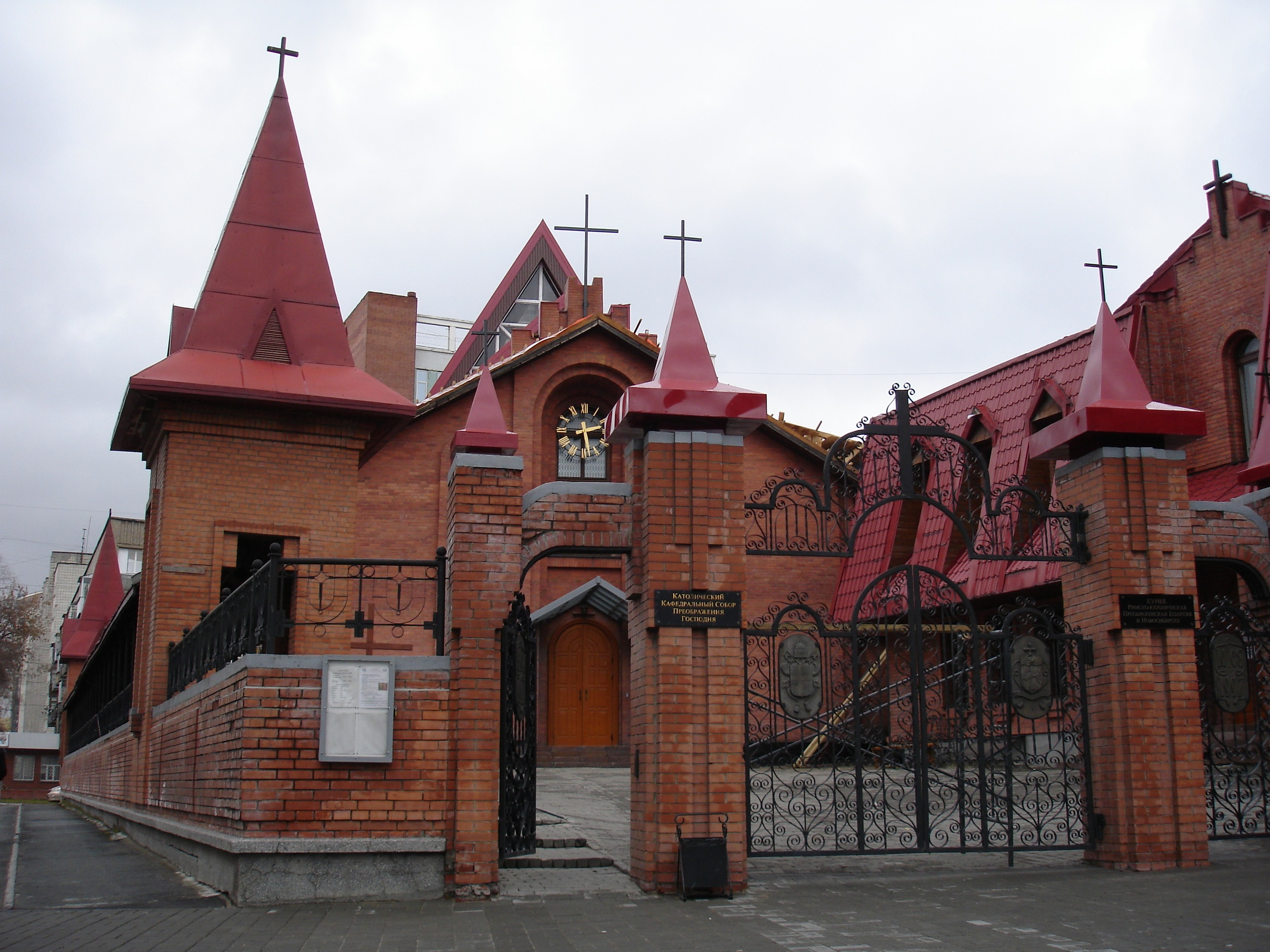
- Transfiguration Cathedral
- Location: Novosibirsk
- Country: Russia
- Denomination: Roman Catholic Church

History
- Founded: 1993
- Dedication: 1997
- Consecrated: 10 August 1997

Architecture
- Architect: Vladimir Borodin

The Transfiguration Cathedral (Russian: Собор Преображения Господня) is a religious building of the Catholic Church that serves as the main temple of the Diocese of the Transfiguration in Novosibirsk in Russia. It was built between 1992 and 1997 in a modern style. It offers religious services including the Mass in Russian and Polish. The cathedral is located at Maxim Gorki Street.

The first stage was completed in 1993 with the design of architect Vladimir Borodin but was not consecrated until the August 10, 1997 in the presence of the Apostolic Nuncio in Russia John Bukovsky and Bishop Joseph Werth.

== See also ==
- Roman Catholicism in Russia
- Transfiguration Cathedral
- Roman Catholic Diocese of Transfiguration at Novosibirsk
