= Tsna (Moksha) =

River in Tambov and Ryazan, Russia

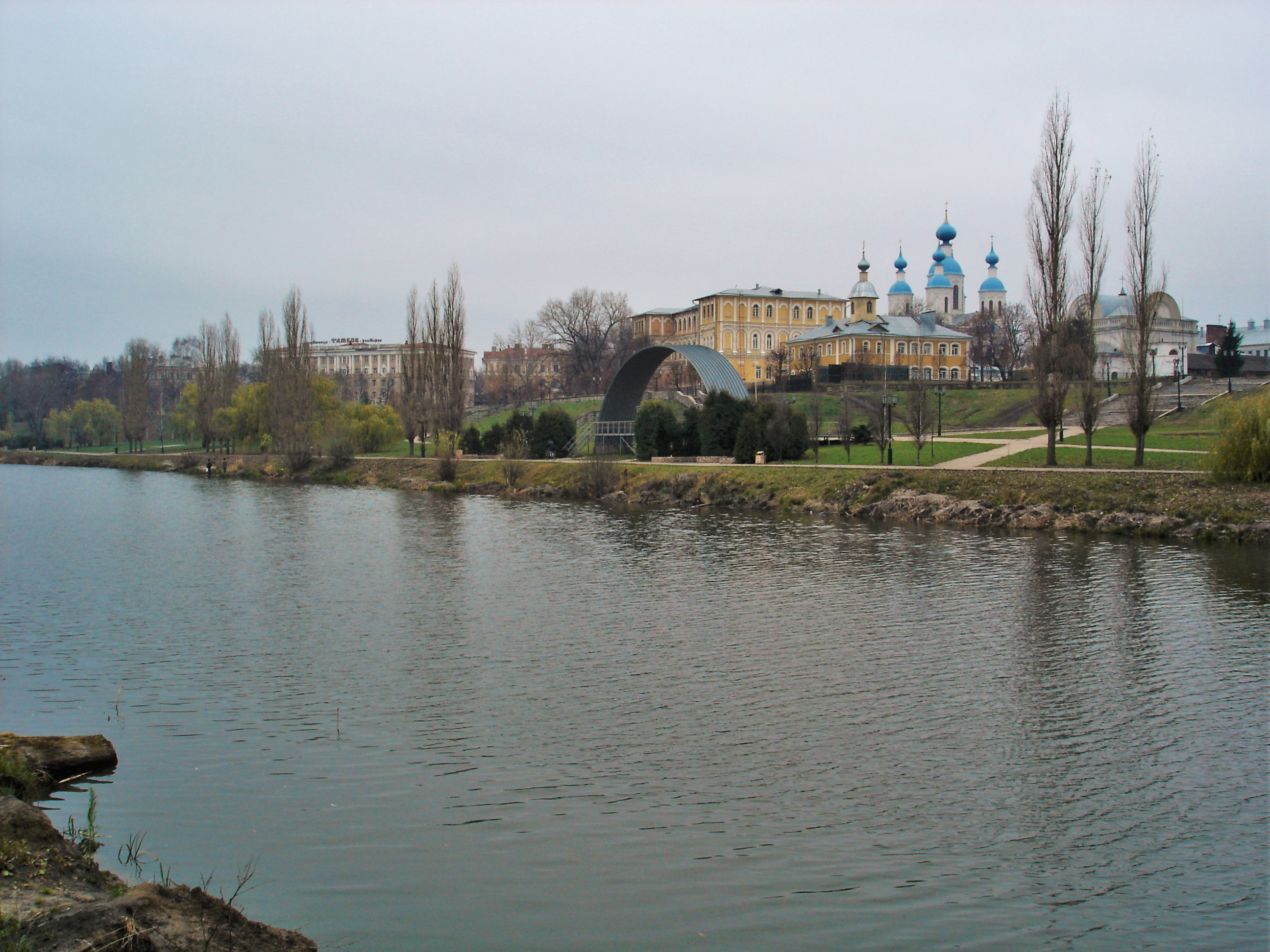
- The Tsna in the Tambov area

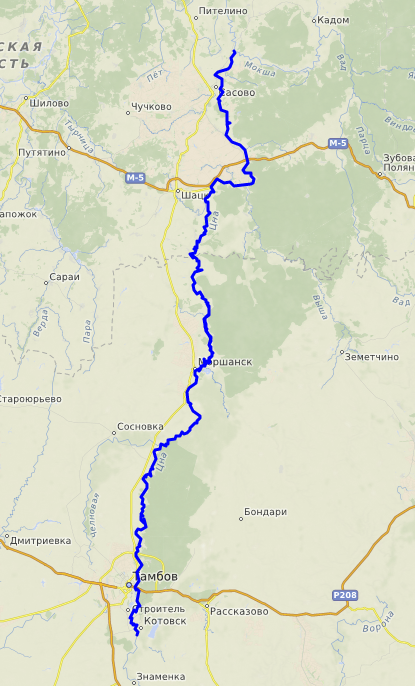
- Native name: Цна (Russian)

Location
- Country: Russia
- Cities: Kotovsk, Tambov, Morshansk, Sasovo

Physical characteristics
- Source
  - location: Sampursky District, Tambov Oblast
  - coordinates: 52°19′N 42°19′E
- Mouth: Moksha
  - location: Sasovsky District, Ryazan Oblast
  - coordinates: 54.4697°N 42.0322°E
  - elevation: 86 m (282 ft)
- Length: 451 km (280 mi)
- Basin size: 21,500 km^{2} (8,300 sq mi)
- Discharge
  - average: 46 m^{3}/s (1,600 cu ft/s)

Basin features
- Progression: Moksha→ Oka→ Volga→ Caspian Sea

The Tsna (in its upper part: Mokraya Vershina) is a river in the Tambov and Ryazan oblasts of Russia, a left tributary of the Moksha (Volga basin). The length of the river is 451 km. The catchment area is 21500 km². The height of the mouth is 86 m above sea level.

On the river are the cities of Kotovsk, Tambov, Morshansk, Sasovo.

It begins in the Sampursky District under the name of Mokraya Vershina.

== Tributaries ==
The Tsna has the following tributaries, from mouth to source:

- 22 km: Aleshnya
- 31 km: Vyalsa
- 67 km: Vysha (Noksa)
- 74 km: Aza
- 98 km: Shacha
- 187 km: Kashma
- 200 km: Piterka
- 222 km: Kersha
- 246 km: Chelnovaya
- 365 km: Lesnoy Tambov
- 375 km: Lipovitsa
- 381 km: river without a name, near Vorontsovka
- 386 km: Karian
- 406 km: Antiushevka
- 420 km: Osinovka
- 425 km: Ponzari

Karian - length 48 km, Lipovitsa - 52 km, Lesnoy Tambov - 89 km, Chelnaya 121 km, Kersha with Khmelina - 86 and 49 km, Kashma with Bolshoy and Small Lomovis - respectively 111, 106, 66 km, Serp - 66 km.

== Etymology ==
The name of the river (as well as the Oka tributary of the same name) is usually derived from the Baltic *tasna, comparing it with Prussian *tusnan "quiet". Less popular is the version of origin from the Old Russian *dysna "right", bringing together the name with the hydronym of the Desna.

== Description ==
A calm, flat river, heavily regulated by dams, navigable in places from Tambov itself. The list of inland waterways in Russia includes a section from the mouth to the village of Ten'siupino with a length of 47 km (2002). The left bank is treeless, heavily populated, but the villages are mostly 1–3 km from the river. Along the right bank almost everywhere there is a forest belt, but it comes to the water only in certain places, as it was cut down during the Great Patriotic War.

On the bank of the Tsna River there is the Holy Spring, known in Tambov and the nearest regions, located in the village of Treguliai. In the summer, many people come there to drink from the spring or bathe.

The Tsna below Tambov is a meandering calm river, 40–80 m wide, flowing along a wide valley with a lot of creeks, a stream where you can go fishing. On the banks of the reeds, thickets of bush. Water is markedly polluted.

From Tambov to Morshansk there are 5 dams with locks. The first - in the village of Tambov Forestry. The second one is near the village of Goreloe. Behind her, the river makes a long loop. Near the village of Troitskaya Dubrava is the third gateway. Behind the village of Kuleshovo is an oak forest. The forest comes to the shore and near the village of Perkino. In the city of Tambov in 1912 was built the first in the Tambov region a small hydroelectric station.

Below Perkino begins the Semikinskiy Canal, which significantly shortens the way for Tsna. In the floodplain of Tsna near Perkino, Semikino and below - the labyrinths of overgrown with old reeds.

Below the village of Semikino - Lake Lebyazhye and Orekhov Zaton - the largest floodplain lakes on the river Tsna. Below the Lake Orekhov Zaton on the high right bank is a natural species platform, from where the panorama of the village of Kulevatovo, the floodplain of the Tsna River, the mouth of the Chelnovoi River comes off.

The fourth dam is behind the village of Mamontovo, the fifth - in Morshansk.

Below Morshansk, Tsna becomes wider, the current is faster, beaches with small, sometimes silty, sand appear. The shores are mainly meadow, only near Mutasievo on the right bank of the wedge is the forest to which the creek leads.

Before the village Serpovoe - the sixth dam. Ten kilometers from the dam after the mouth of the Serp tributary on the right high bank is a pine forest. At local residents this tract is called the Serpovsky Utesom.

Pine forest, reaching the river, there is also in front of the Rysly; Behind the village there is a floating bridge. The village of Chernitovo is a dam. Behind the dam on the banks again meadows. The river becomes wide (from 100 to 200 m).

Before the last dam (HPP), the river forms a reservoir with a length of about 6 km and a width of 0.5 km.

The dam is also in the area of the villages Aglomazovo and Tenshupino, where the river spills about 1 km. But after the reconstruction of the dam, the dam began to collapse year after year, and now the river has become much shallow.

Below the dam, the channel of the Tsna is narrowed to 40–50 m, the current accelerates, sandy rifts appear. The forest approaches the water in the form of separate islands. In Soviet times, the river was used for navigation, along the entire length of the shipping section from Tambov. For passenger navigation, air-cushion ships (SVPs) of the Zarnitsa type were used.

Widely used by tourists for rafting.

== Gallery ==
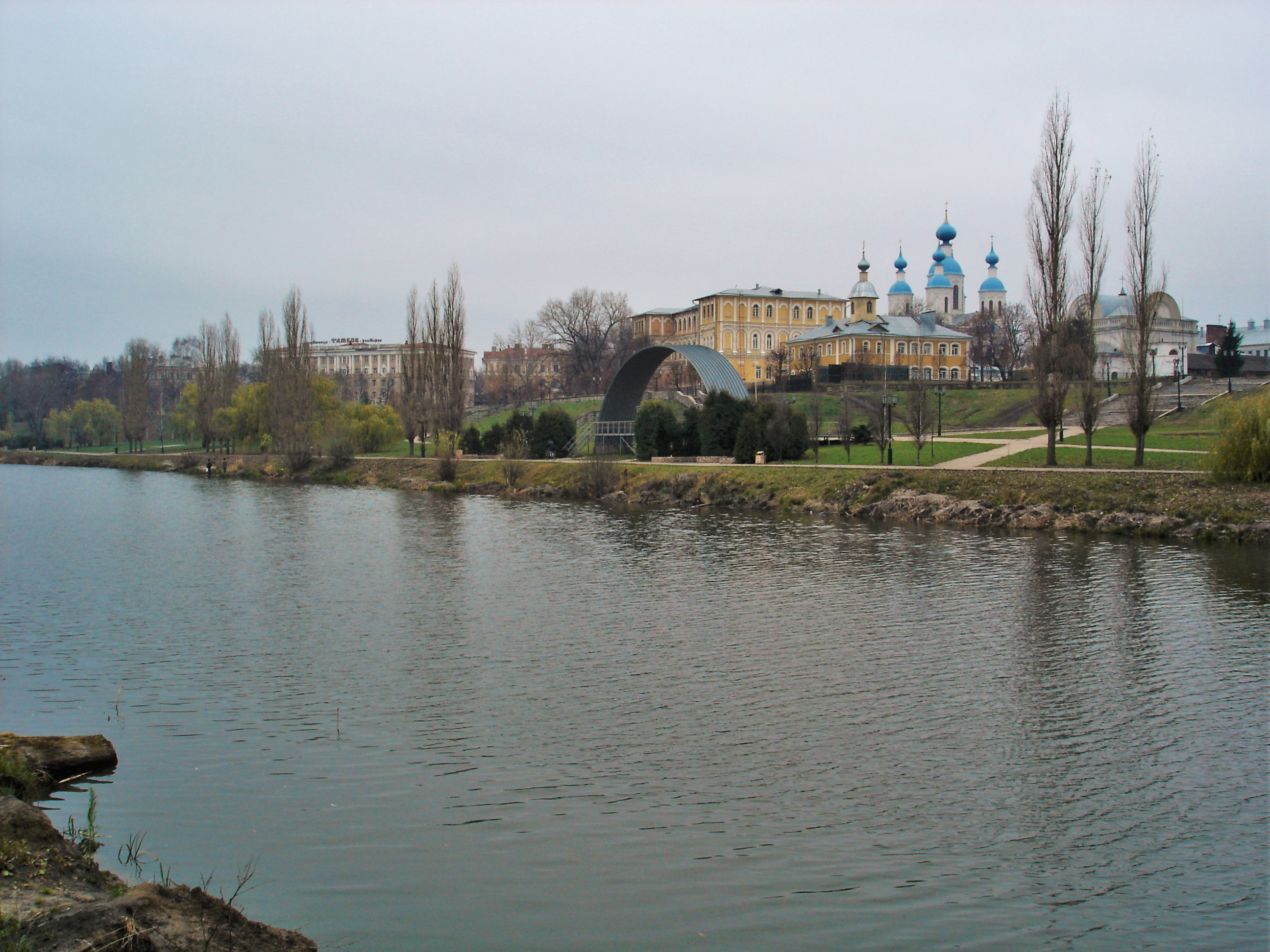
The river in Tambov (autumn)

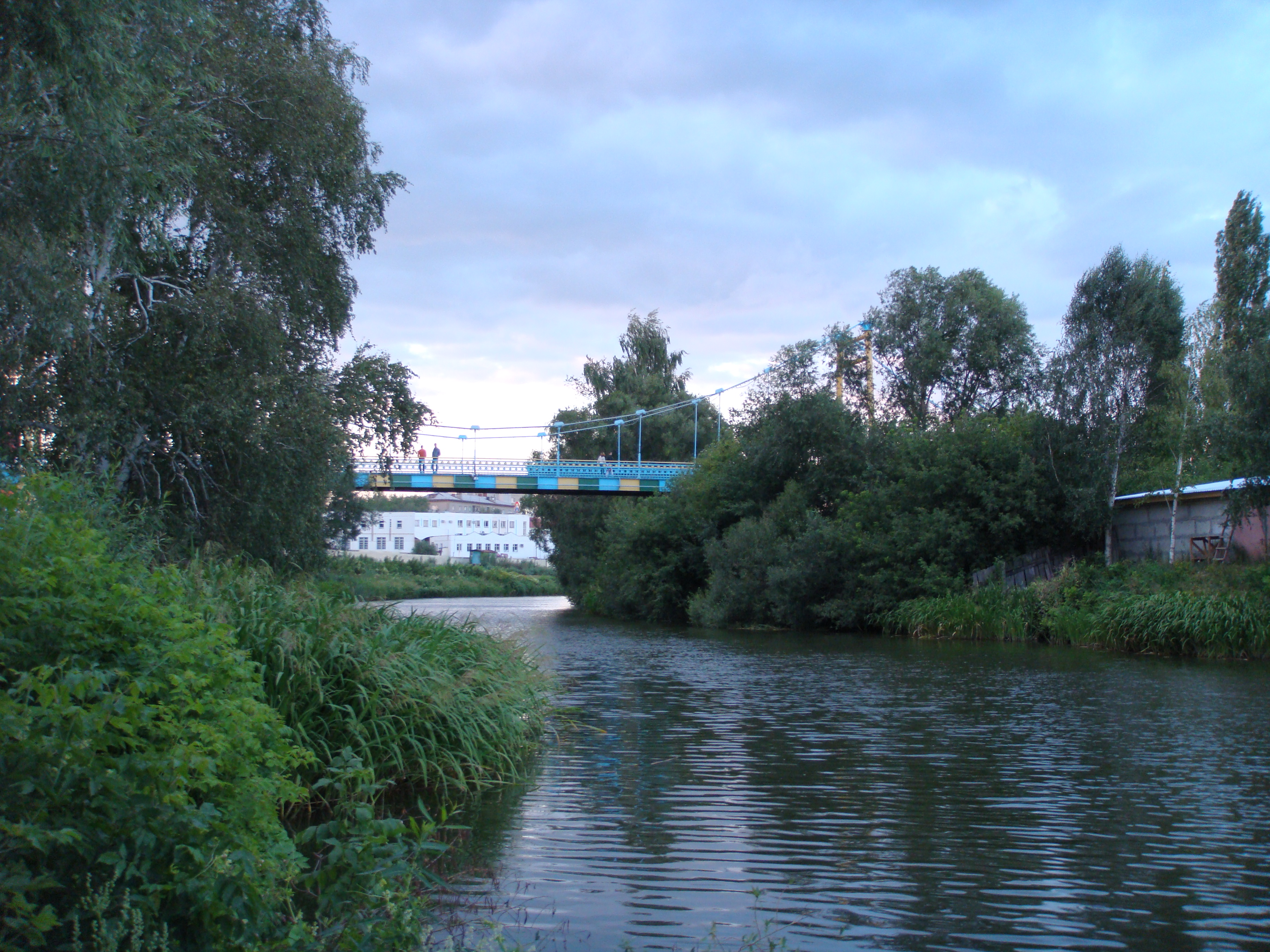
The river in Tambov (summer)

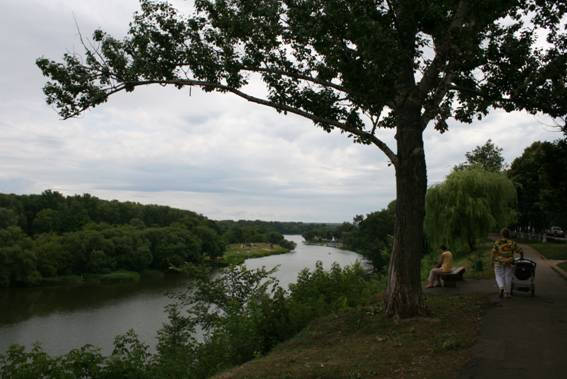
New river bed
