= Sasovo =

Sasovo (Russian: Сасово) is the name of several inhabited localities in Russia.

Urban localities

- Sasovo, Ryazan Oblast, a town in Ryazan Oblast; administratively incorporated as a town of oblast significance

Rural localities

- Sasovo, Tula Oblast, a village in Vasilyevsky Rural Okrug of Venyovsky District of Tula Oblast
