= Uvarovo, Sobinsky District, Vladimir Oblast =

Uvarovo Уварово
- Village
- Location within Vladimir Oblast Location within Russia
- Coordinates: 56°03′N 39°56′E
- Country: Russia
- Region: Vladimir Oblast
- District: Sobinsky District
- Time zone: UTC+3:00

Uvarovo (Russian: Уварово) is a rural locality (a village) in Kurilovskoye Rural Settlement, Sobinsky District, Vladimir Oblast, Russia. The village had a population of 16 in 2010.

== Geography ==
Uvarovo is located 12 km north of Sobinka (the district's administrative centre) by road. Fyodorovka is the nearest rural locality.
