= SATIS Expo =

The SATIS Expo is an annual trade show targeted at media broadcasters in French-speaking markets. The 2014 show in Porte de Versailles was the "32nd edition" with over 15000 attendees.

== See also ==
- SATIS Expo English-speaking page
