= Tambov Cathedral =

Church building in Tambov, Russia

Coordinates: 52.72702°N 41.45889°E

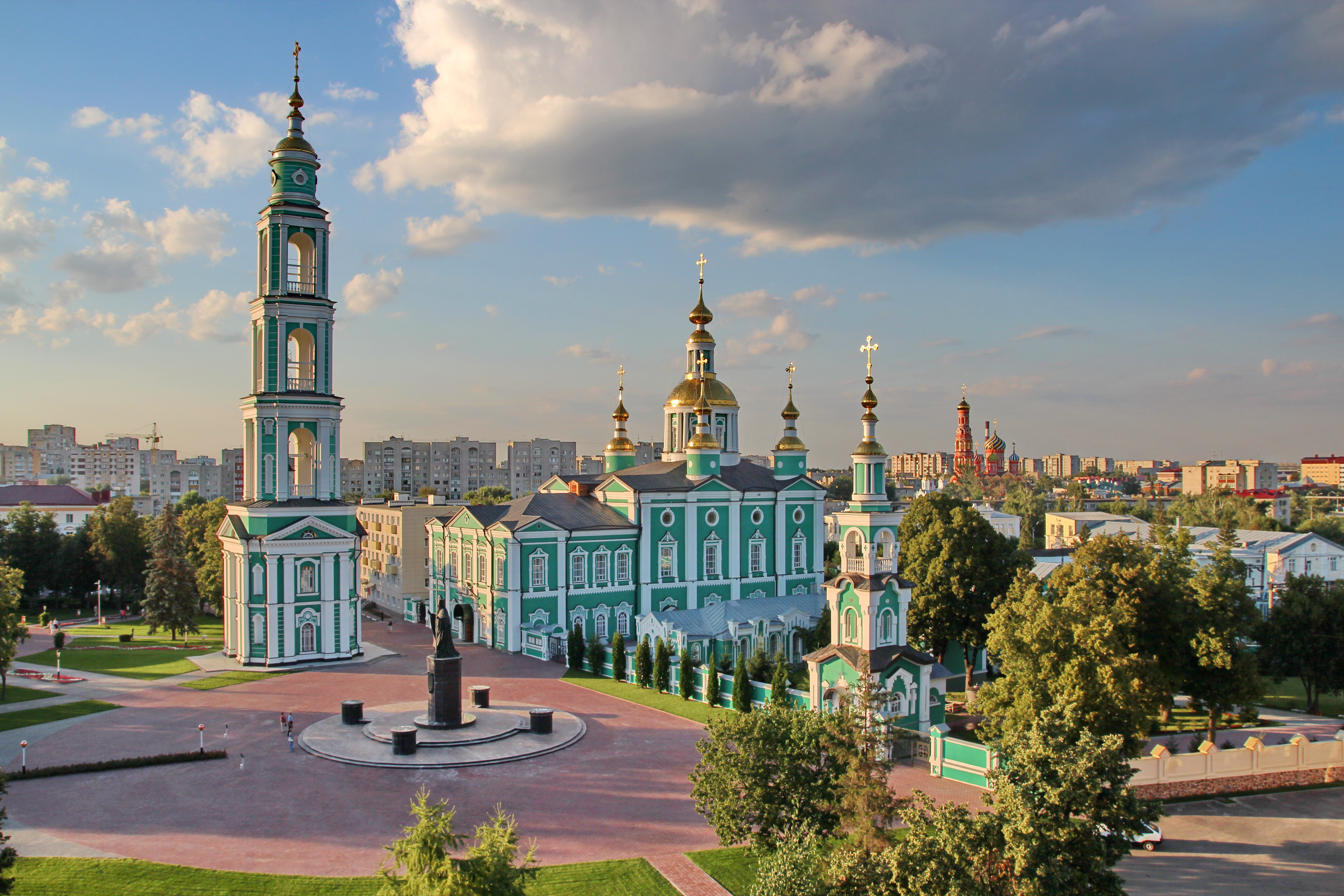
The cathedral compound in 2015

The Cathedral of the Saviour's Transfiguration (Russian: Спасо-Преображенский собор) is the main church of Tambov, Russia. It has been the seat of the Tambov Eparchy of the Russian Orthodox Church almost since its inception.

The original wooden church honoring the Feast of the Transfiguration was built in 1636 — the same year when the town of Tambov was founded.

The eparchy was established in 1682 as part of a string of new bishoprics that were meant to promote Christianity in the sparsely populated steppe region formerly known as the Wild Field. The first bishops decided to replace the wooden church with a bigger stone building patterned after a new Baroque cathedral in Ryazan.

Construction works started in 1694 at the instigation of Bishop Pitirim and, due to a lack of funds, took 90 years to complete. The five-domed cathedral — the first brick church in the city — was decorated in the late Baroque style and was consecrated in 1783.

The church contained the tombs of St. Pitirim and other local bishops. It boasted several precious icons, some of them painted by Pitirim. Between 1929 and 1991, the church was closed to worship and used as a regional museum.

The free-standing Neoclassical belltower was constructed in the 1810s. It was pulled down by the Bolsheviks in 1931, only to be rebuilt 80 years later. At 42.5 meters, it used to be the tallest building in the Governorate of Tambov.

The statue of Bishop Pitirim in front of the campanile was designed by Aleksandr Rukavishnikov, a well-known sculptor from Moscow. It was unveiled in 2014.
