= Moksha (river) =

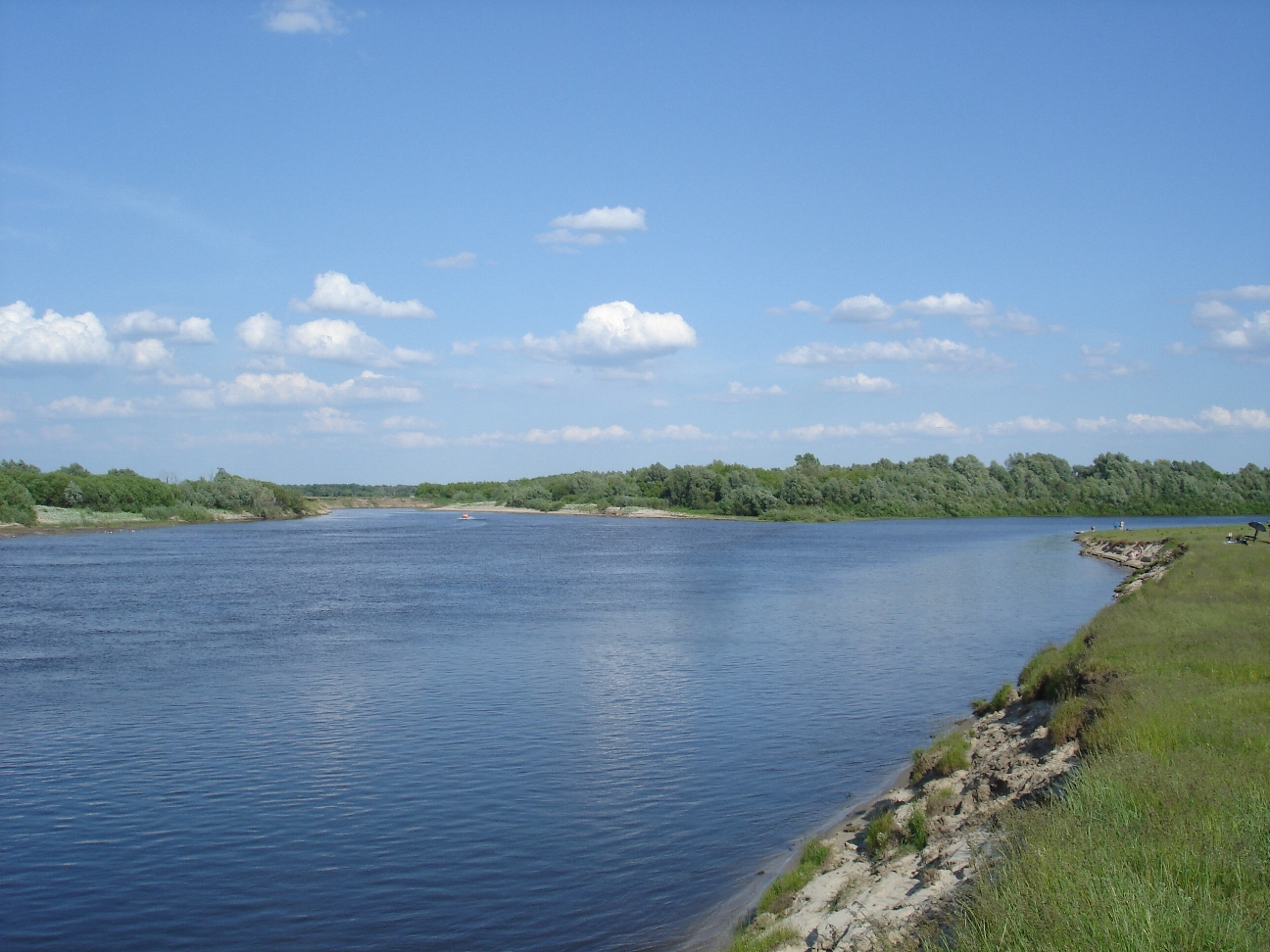

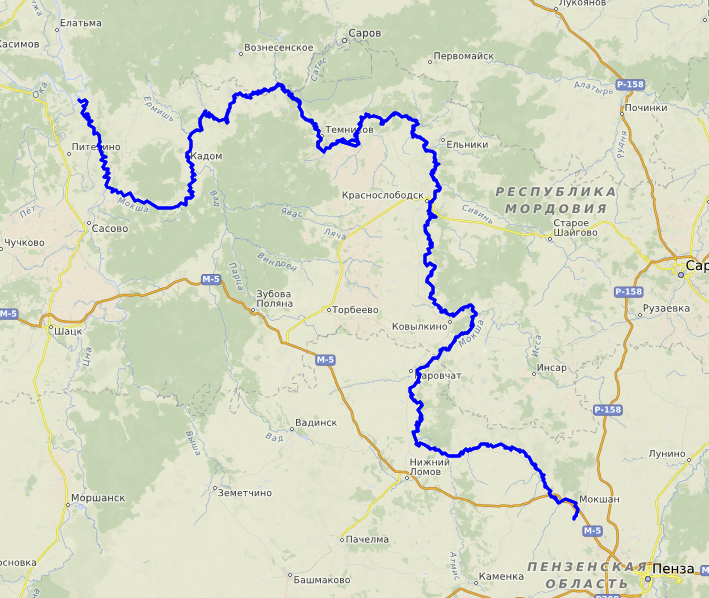
- Course of the Moksha

Location
- Country: Russia
- Region: Penza Oblast, Nizhny Novgorod Oblast, Republic of Mordovia, Ryazan Oblast
- Cities: Temnikov, Krasnoslobodsk, Kovylkino

Physical characteristics
- Source: Vydygadovka
  - location: Privolzhskaya Upland, Mokshansky District, Penza Oblast
  - coordinates: 53.3202°N 44.5203°E
- Mouth: Oka
  - location: Pitelinsky District, Ryazan Oblast
  - coordinates: 54°44′35″N 41°52′42″E
  - elevation: 79 m (259 ft)
- Length: 656 km (408 mi)
- Basin size: 51,000 km^{2} (20,000 sq mi)
- Discharge
  - location: 72 km from the mouth
  - average: 95 m^{3}/s (3,400 cu ft/s)

Basin features
- Progression: Oka→ Volga→ Caspian Sea
- Tributaries
  - left: Vad, Tsna
  - right: Sivin, Satis

Moksha (Russian: Мо́кша, Moksha: Йов) is a river in central Russia, a right tributary of the Oka. It flows through Penza Oblast, Nizhny Novgorod Oblast, Ryazan Oblast and the Republic of Mordovia, and joins the Oka near Pyatnitsky Yar, near the city of Kasimov.

It is 656 kilometres (408 mi) in length, and has a drainage basin of 51,000 square kilometres (20,000 sq mi).

In the 1950s, several hydroelectric power stations were built in the middle course of the river, but without navigable locks. In 1955, 2 km below the mouth of the river. Prices on the Moksha River built Rasypukhinsky hydro-power plant with a hydroelectric power station and a wooden shipping lock. Navigation on the river was carried out until the mid-1990s.

On the Moksha is the Trinity-Scans monastery, the Nativity-Theotokos Sanaksar Monastery and the Krasnoslobodsky Savior-Transfiguration Monastery.

== Origin of name and cultural significance ==
The name is connected to the ancient Indo-European population of the Pohje, speaking a language close to the Baltic. Hydronym is comparable with the Indo-European basis meksha, meaning "spillage, leakage". It is suggested that in the language of Indo-European aborigines moksha meant "stream, current, river" and as a term entered into a series of hydronyms (Shirmksha, Mamoksha, etc.).

The name "Moksha" is mentioned by the monk-minorite Rubruk, the ambassador of the French King Louis IX to the Mongolian khan Sartak (1253). It is also the self-designation for the eponymous Finno-Ugric ethnic group of Mokshas that have settled between the river and its tributary Oka as a tribe before the Middle Ages.

== Sources ==
In the monograph "The Nature of the Penza Region" it is pointed out that p. Moksha originates from above. Lookout Nechaevsky (now Mokshan district) of the Penza region. According to the latest information, Moksha begins in a ravine from the springs system near the village of Elizavetino. The source of Moksha is on a treeless place. Research conducted in 2009-2010. Showed that from the south with. Lookout among the elevated places stretches low (up to Elizavetino) about 6 kilometres (3.7 mi) long. This site is called "Dry Moksha". In the hollow with a sandy and clay bottom 20–40 centimetres (7.9–15.7 in) deep, a creeping stream of 0.5–1.5 centimetres (0.20–0.59 in) in width runs (the study was conducted in May 2010). The constant flow of water is observed below the confluence of the hollow from the holy spring, where a small extension of the channel also forms. A true watercourse flows towards Vision in a poorly developed channel. In some places, the banks collapse in the face of the knocking out of them groundwater flowing into the channel. The bottom of the lowland where the stream flows is swamped. Along the banks of the stream, shrubs of willows, thickets of broadleaf cattails, reeds of forest and some other moisture-loving plants grow in the water. Thus, the source of Moksha is a drying creek, now fueled by thawed and groundwater. It stretches to c. The look gradually turning into a constant stream.

== Tributaries ==
The Moksha has the following tributaries, from mouth to source:

- 49 km: Yezhachka
- 51 km: Tsna
- 82 km: Urzeva (Chyornaya Rechka)
- 105 km: Vad
- 121 km: Yermish
- 135 km: Shoksha
- 144 km: Yuzga
- 150 km: Vyazhka
- 160 km: Vedyazha
- 170 km: Varnava
- 177 km: Uzhovka
- 183 km: Sarma
- 191 km: Satis
- 231 km: Lomovka
- 248 km: Bolshoy Aksel
- 258 km: Urey (Ureyka)
- 266 km: Shavits (Varskley)
- 294 km: Nuluy
- 295 km: Urkat
- 302 km: Sukhoy Urey
- 310 km: Varma
- 338 km: Sivin
- 346 km: Shapa
- 351 km: Gumenka
- 360 km: Ryabka
- 373 km: Linyevka
- 388 km: Bolshaya Azyas
- 412 km: Sezelka
- 418 km: Mokshan
- 420 km: Lashma
- 432 km: Unuy
- 437 km: Issa
- 464 km: Panzha
- 477 km: Sheldais
- 492 km: Kamora
- 497 km: Kaurets
- 500 km: Modayev
- 532 km: Lomovka
- 540 km: Atmiss
- 545 km: Iva
- 553 km: Kerka
- 562 km: Losma (near the village Gorlitsyno)
- 563 km: Vyunka
- 586 km: Medayevka (Madayevka)
- 596 km: Muromka (Shirkoiss)
- 599 km: Skachki
- 604 km: Yulovka
- 620 km: Azyas
- 624 km: Saranka
