= Maksim Mysin =

Russian footballer

Personal information
- Full name: Maksim Aleksandrovich Mysin
- Date of birth: 12 December 1979 (age 46)
- Place of birth: Tambov, Russian SFSR
- Height: 1.81 m (5 ft 11 1/2 in)
- Positions: Defender; midfielder; forward

Senior career*
| Years | Team | Apps | (Gls) |
| 1998 | FC Stroitel Morshansk | 25 | (0) |
| 1999–2000 | FC Spartak Tambov | 26 | (0) |
| 2003 | FC Lada Togliatti | 6 | (0) |
| 2004 | FC Nosta Novotroitsk | 7 | (0) |
| 2004 | FC Spartak Tambov | 12 | (0) |
| 2005 | FC Pskov-2000 | 13 | (0) |
| 2005 | FC Lobnya-Alla Lobnya | 10 | (0) |
| 2006 | FC Okzhetpes | 1 | (0) |
| 2006–2007 | FC Spartak Tambov | 35 | (3) |
| 2008 | FC Avangard Podolsk (amateur) | | |
- * Club domestic league appearances and goals

Maksim Aleksandrovich Mysin (Russian: Максим Александрович Мысин; born 12 December 1979) is a former Russian professional footballer.

== Club career ==
He played in the Russian Football National League for FC Lada Togliatti in 2003.
