= Tambov =

Tambov Тамбов
- City
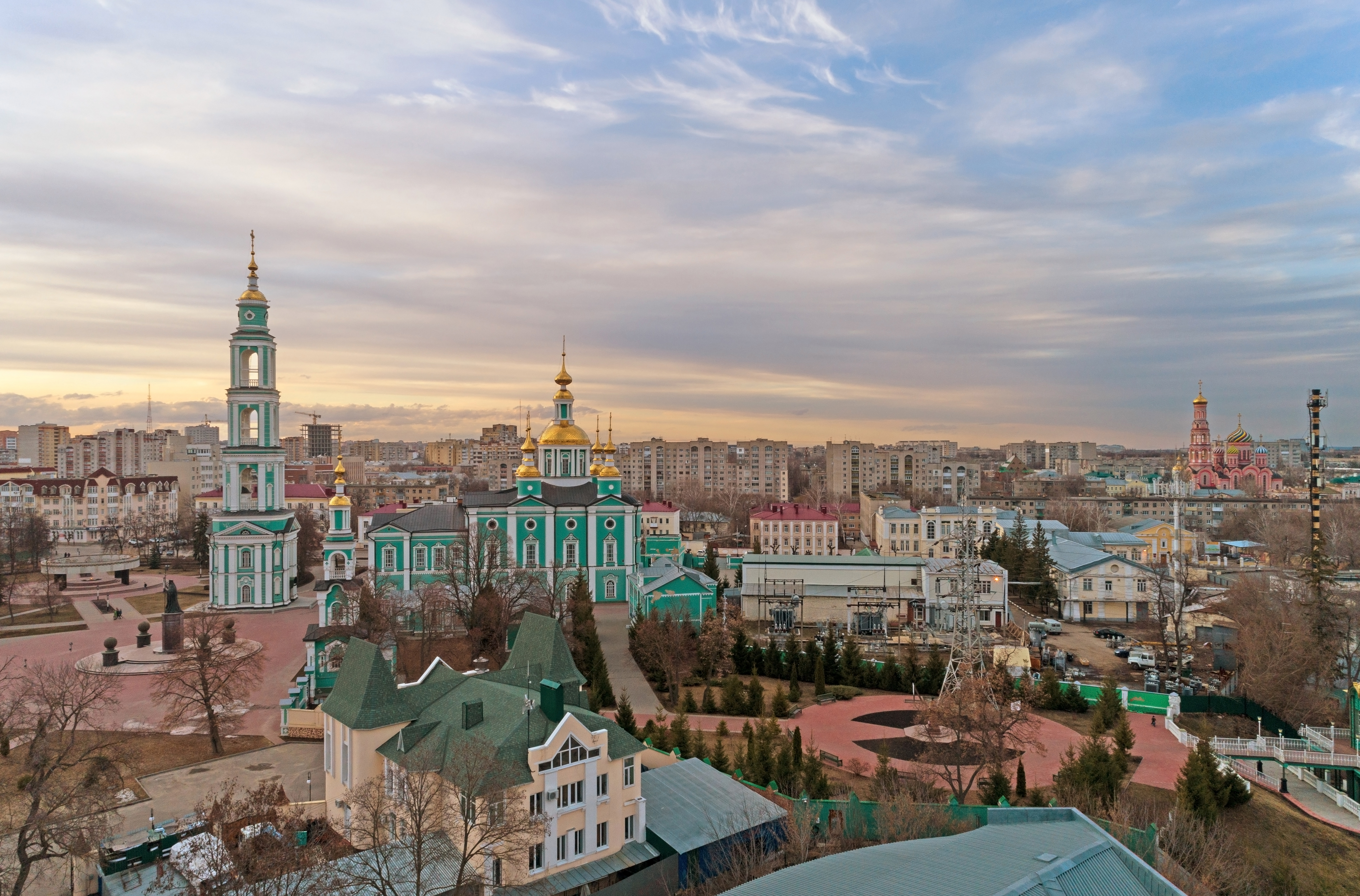

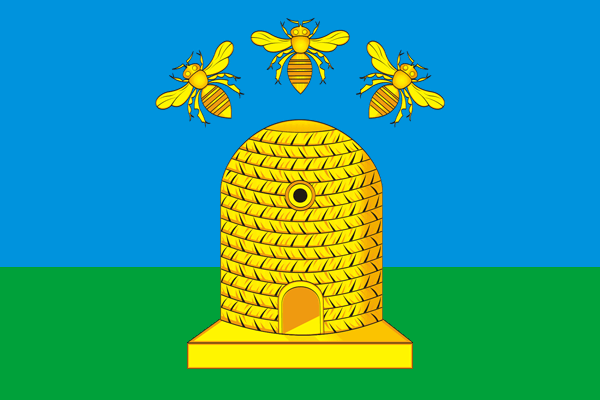
- Flag Coat of arms
- Interactive map of Tambov
- Location of Tambov Tambov (Russia) Tambov (European Russia) Tambov (Europe)
- Coordinates: 52°43′23″N 41°27′14″E
- Country: Russia
- Federal subject: Tambov Oblast
- Founded: April 17, 1636
- City status since: 1719

Government
  - Mayor: Maxim Kosenkov

Area
  - Total: 90.89 km^{2} (35.09 sq mi)
- Elevation: 130 m (430 ft)

Population (2010 Census)
  - Total: 280,161
  - Estimate (2025): 254,940 (−9%)
  - Rank: 68th in 2010
  - Density: 3,082/km^{2} (7,983/sq mi)

Administrative status
  - Subordinated to: city of oblast significance of Tambov
  - Capital of: Tambov Oblast, Tambovsky District

Municipal status
  - Urban okrug: Tambov Urban Okrug
  - Capital of: Tambov Urban Okrug, Tambovsky Municipal District
- Time zone: UTC+3 (MSK)
- Postal code: 392000
- Dialing code: +7 4752
- OKTMO ID: 68701000001
- City Day: June 12
- Website: city.tambov.gov.ru

Tambov (UK: /tæmˈbɒf/ tam-BOF, US: /tɑːmˈbɔːf, -ˈbɔːv/ tahm-BAWF, -BAWV; Russian: Тамбов, IPA: [tɐmˈbof]) is a city and the administrative center of Tambov Oblast, central Russia, at the confluence of the Tsna and Studenets rivers, about 418 km (260 mi) south-southeast of Moscow. With a population of 261,803 as of 2021, Tambov is the largest city, and historical center, of the Tambov Oblast as a whole.

Historical population
Year	Pop.	±%
1897	48,000	—
1926	73,862	+53.9%
1939	123,207	+66.8%
1959	172,171	+39.7%
1970	229,791	+33.5%
1979	270,073	+17.5%
1989	304,600	+12.8%
2002	293,658	−3.6%
2010	280,161	−4.6%
2021	261,803	−6.6%
Source: Census data

== Etymology ==
The name "Tambov" originates from a Mokshan word (Moksha: томбале, romanized: tombale, lit. 'the other side, the remote one').

== Geography ==
=== Urban layout ===
In terms of its layout, Tambov was no different from other fortified cities – the Kremlin, the prison and a small settlement. The chosen place was in full compliance with the requirements of the fortification. From the north and east, the new fortress was washed by rivers, and from the west and south it was protected by artificial ditches filled with water by the Studenets River. The Kremlin was surrounded by a six-meter wooden wall with 12 towers, from the south-west it was adjoined by a prison, also surrounded by a wall, and beyond the river there was a settlement. A church, a voivode's house, several administrative buildings and a mobile cellar were built inside the Kremlin. The Cossacks who were serving lived in a prison, and trading shops soon opened up here. Craftsmen settled on the posad.

As the urban area grew, settlements began to appear, where service people settled – Pushkarskaya, Streletskaya, Polkovaya. Peasants settled in Pokrovskaya Sloboda. The central part of the city was occupied by the former Kremlin and posad. There were streets in the Kremlin: Lipetskaya, Namestnicheskaya, Penzenskaya, crossing Bolshaya Astrakhanskaya street. Shirokaya, Dvoryanskaya, Monastyrskaya and Streletskaya streets appeared in the posad. The Pokrovskaya Sloboda included Seminarskaya, Pokrovskaya, Nachalnaya s Odnodvorcheskaya streets. It was the southern outskirts of the 18th-century city. Behind the Varvara Church was Invalidnaya Sloboda. In the northern part of the city in the 18th century, across the Studenets River, there were Pushkarskaya and Polkovaya settlements. They were separated by a small river Gavryushka. As the borders of the Russian state advanced to the south, Tambov lost its importance as a military guard fortress by the end of the 17th century. The city was increasingly becoming a transit trade center. By that time, there were three districts on the territory of Tambov. The Kremlin remained a place of concentration of military and administrative power. Ostrog acquired trade functions: there were shops, a kruzhniy yard and a customs hut. Posad became a place for the development of crafts and the construction of grain warehouses. The defensive structures of the city were renewed again in 1738, when it was ordered to fix and re-equip the Tambov fortress in connection with the outbreak of the Russian-Turkish war. However, the city did not acquire military significance. In 1779, the Tambov governorship was formed, later renamed to the province.

For about 150 years since its establishment in 1636, Tambov freely developed around the fortress, which stood at the bend of the Tsna River, and was divided into two parts by the Studenets River. By that time, there were settlements here: Cossack (Streletskaya), Pushkarskaya, Storozhevaya (Kazachya, Казачья), Polkovaya, Panskaya and Pokrovskaya.

The city's layout began to change after 1781. As part of the redevelopment of the Russian cities at the 18th century the new system of provincial cities was to be embodied in their newest appearance – in the spatial and architectural order, expressed in geometric correctness and regularity of the international style of classicism, in contrast to the previously existing picturesque structure, which began to be perceived as a mess. The general plan of Tambov was approved on December 9, 1781, by Catherine II. The urban planning document was aimed at clearing the urban space of old, random buildings, freely located, and creating an ordered grid-structure with geometrically regular lines of houses and straight streets. In 1781, Governor-General Roman Illarionovich Vorontsov was invited to Tambov from St. Petersburg to the newly opened position of the provincial architect from the "soldiers' children" of the collegiate registrar Vasily Antonovich Usachev, who became the coordinator of the implementation of Tambov's urban planning plan. The streets of the city center were based on the old roads that formed around the fortifications of the fortress, erected in 1636 under the governor Roman Boborykin. The central axis of the foundation of the oldest building in Tambov, the Transfiguration Cathedral now does not fit into the regular plan of the central part of Tambov, recalling the initial originality of the space of the fortified city. A number of longitudinal streets appeared: First and Second Dolgie (Dolovye Streets) and Obvodnaya, which along the river valley. Rzhavets circled the western part of the city. From Tambov there were roads to Penza and the district towns of Kozlov, Morshansk, Lipetsk. Streets sprout along these roads. Kuzminskaya Street led out through the village. Kuzminka on the Astrakhan tract. Noblemen settled on the central cross street. The street is named Shirokaya Dvoryanskaya. In the shopping districts of the city, Khlebnaya Square was formed, it is bordered by Khlebnaya and Muchnaya streets. Near Sennaya (later Bazaar) squares are formed from the east by Proyezhaya, and from the west – by Vyez'zhaya streets. The outskirts of the streets were inhabited by petty officials – clerks and odnodvorets, which was reflected in their names. The southern part of the city was built up at the beginning of the 19th century. New, First, Second, Third, Fourth, Fifth streets appear here, and later – Kirpichnaya, Kamennaya and Invalidnaya streets.

== History ==
Tambov was founded by the decree of Tsar Mikhail Fyodorovich on April 17, 1636 (Old Style). Originally, it was a border fortress against attacks by the Crimean Tatars, but it soon declined in importance as a military outpost. It then became the region's administrative and trade centre.

In the first half of the 17th century, the Tsardom of Russia created the Belgorosk defensive line to protect the lands from the raids of nomads and to strengthen the southern borders. Together with other cities, a fortress city of Tambov was built on it, the foundation of which dates back to 1636. The diploma of Mikhail Fyodorovich issued on April 17, 1636 (Old Style) reads: "To put from Shatskiy Ukraine, on the field, on the Tsna river, at the mouth of the Lipovitsa river the city of Tambov, and in it to arrange service people." The original name of the city was spelled "Tonbov" and was associated with the supposed site of the fortress on the Lipovitsa River opposite the Mordovian village of Tonbov and the river of the same name. But the city was founded in another place, downstream of the Tsna River, at the mouth of the Studenets River. The head of the construction and the first voivode of the new fortress, stolnik Roman Boborykin, chose a place for the fortress more suitable in military and commercial terms. From the first years of its existence, Crimean and Nogai Tatars attacked Tambov more than once. The Tambov garrison successfully repelled almost all the attacks of the steppe inhabitants, but there were also failures. So, in the spring of 1644, the Tatars who suddenly attacked the city managed to capture 20 Cossacks, and during the pursuit another 30 warriors died. For ten years the city fortifications collapsed and fell into disrepair. In 1647, construction of ready-made defensive structures began in Tambov, which lasted for seven years. The Kremlin was reequipped with new cannons sent from Tula, a new cellar and "sovereign's grain stores" were erected in it to store grain supplies and other products in case of a siege. During the Azov campaigns, the city became the site of the formation of military units that left for Azov. As a district town, Tambov is attributed to the Azov province in 1708.

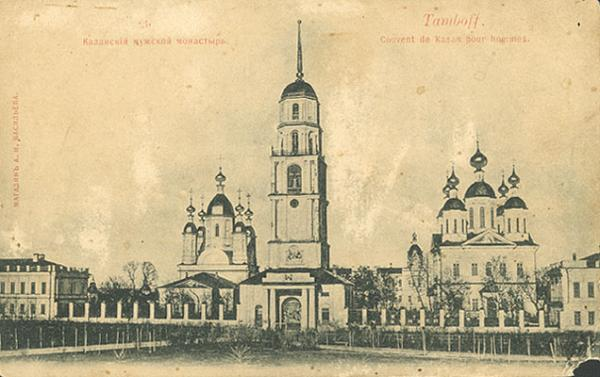
A pre-revolutionary view of the Kazansky Monastery

In 1719 it became the main city of the then-established Tambov province. The province became part of the Azov province, which in 1732 was renamed after its capital city, Voronezh. Trade routes passed through Tambov, connecting it with Moscow, the cities of the Black Earth Region and the Volga Region. The roads were served by about 500 Tambov coachmen, but farmers remained the main population of the city. Due to the large amount of unplowed land in the Tambov province, animal husbandry developed widely, and with it trade in livestock and especially wool, which was in high demand in the Russian markets. Tambov wool became the reason for the creation of the first cloth factories in Tambov.

However, the administrative and commercial functions of the city were not in line with the slow economic growth of Tambov. In terms of the number of townspeople, it lagged behind many provincial centers such as Oryol, Kursk and Voronezh. In the 1780s things began to change when poet and statesman Gavrila Derzhavin was appointed as the governor. He proved himself to be an excellent administrator and expert in the economy of the region entrusted to him. Derzhavin made his apartment a place for public meetings, concerts, and even a school for children and youth, in which arithmetic and grammar were taught. Derzhavin took care of the establishment in the city of a club and boarding school for children of the nobility. With the assistance of the educator Nikolay Novikov, he opened a printing house in Tambov, where the first local newspaper, secular books and translations of foreign novels began to be published. A theater, a public school with a four-year period of study was opened in the city, preparations were made for the compilation and publication of a topographic description of the entire governorship. Derzhavin put a lot of effort into the development of navigation along the Tsna, and the river sluice proposed by him made it possible to deliver timber and building stone to Tambov, which the city had previously been deprived of. With his resignation, many projects that contributed to the development and improvement of Tambov were never completed. Only in 1822, almost 40 years later, the paving of the Tambov streets began, for which the stone, prepared during Derzhavin times, was used.

Roman Boborykin, the emperor's court menial (stolnik) and voivode was the town's first builder. Thanks to his experience, the fortress was completed rapidly. Tambov was granted city status in 1719.

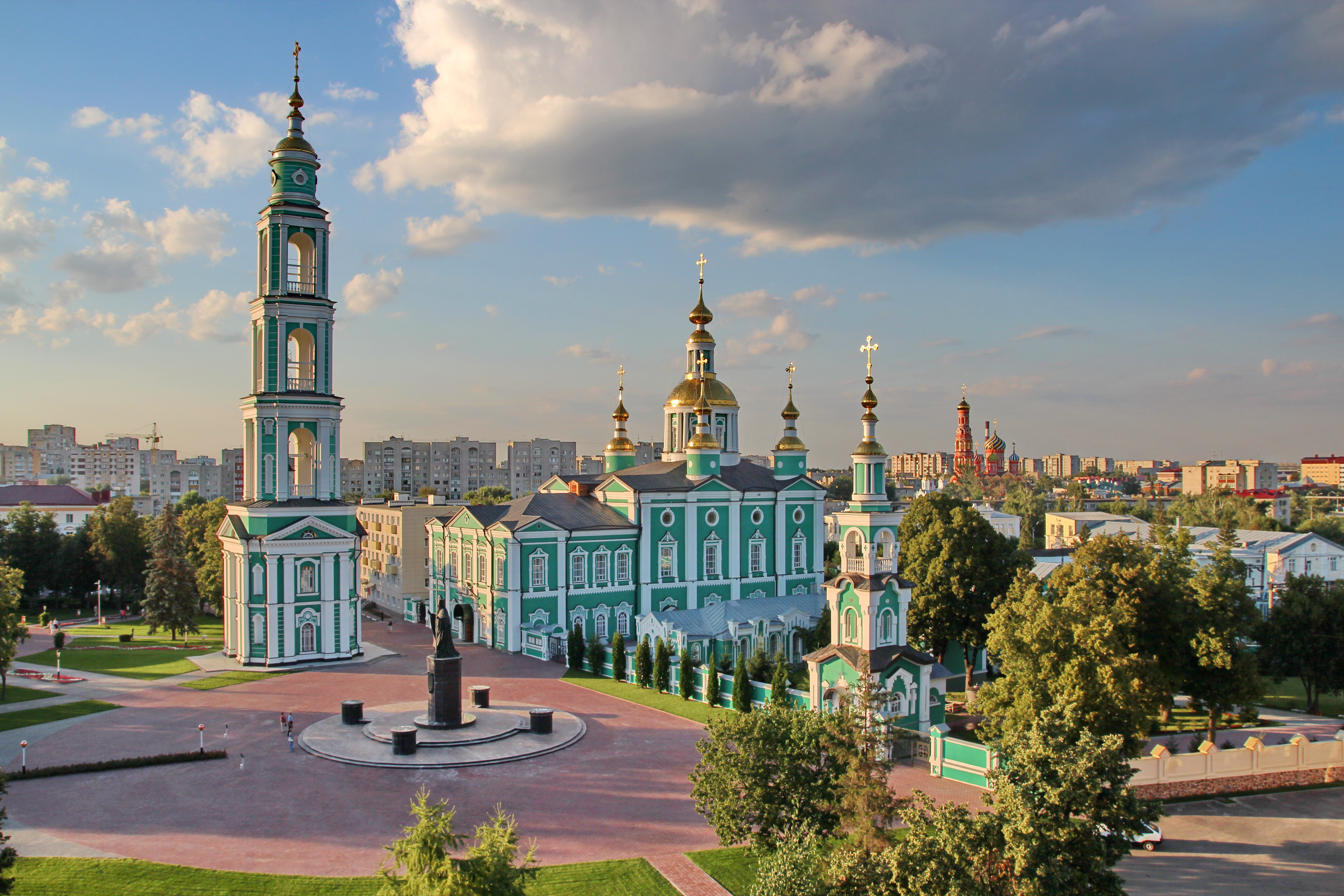
The Transfiguration Cathedral was the first stone church in Tambov

In 1779, Tambov Viceroyalty was formed, and on August 16, 1781, Empress Catherine the Great approved the city's coat of arms depicting a beehive, symbolizing the town's hardworking residents. This viceroyalty was formed from southern parts of Ryazan Viceyorality and northern parts of Voronezh Viceyorality. In March 1786, the disgraced Russian poet and statesman Gavrila Derzhavin was appointed the governor of Tambov Governorate—a post that he held until December 1788. Even during that brief tenure, he accomplished a great deal: a theatre, a college, a dancing school, a printing business, an orchestra, and a brickyard were built. Tambov later erected a monument to Derzhavin.

In November 1830, during the Cholera Riots in Russia, the citizens of Tambov attacked their governor, but they were soon suppressed by the regular army. Later in the 19th century, Tambov became a significant cultural centre that supported a growing number of schools, libraries, and other institutions. By 1897, its population was more than 50,000 people.

During the Civil War, in 1920–1921, the region witnessed the Tambov Rebellion—a bitter struggle between local residents and the Bolshevik Red Army. In 1921, a Tambov Republic was established, but it was soon crushed by the Red Army under the command of Mikhail Tukhachevsky. Between 1928 and 1934, Tambov became okrug centre in Central Black Earth Oblast. After dissolving the oblast on June 13, 1934, it became the raion center in Voronezh Oblast. Tambov finally became the centre of Tambov Oblast, which was created from oblasts of Voronezh and Kuybyshev on September 27, 1937. The oblast had present form after separation of Penza Oblast (formerly part of Kuybyshev one) on February 4, 1939.

During and after World War II, most of the Malgré-nous prisoners of war (Frenchmen from annexed Alsace and Moselle who were conscripted in the Wehrmacht) were jailed in "Camp #188" at Tambov. Between 4,000 and 10,000 of them died in this camp.

In 1991, a 360-meter (1,180 ft) high guyed television antenna was built in Tambov. In 2009–2014, a new and 107-meter-tall (351 ft) Neoclassical belltower was built at the Monastery of Our Lady of Kazan, replacing the one demolished by the Communists.

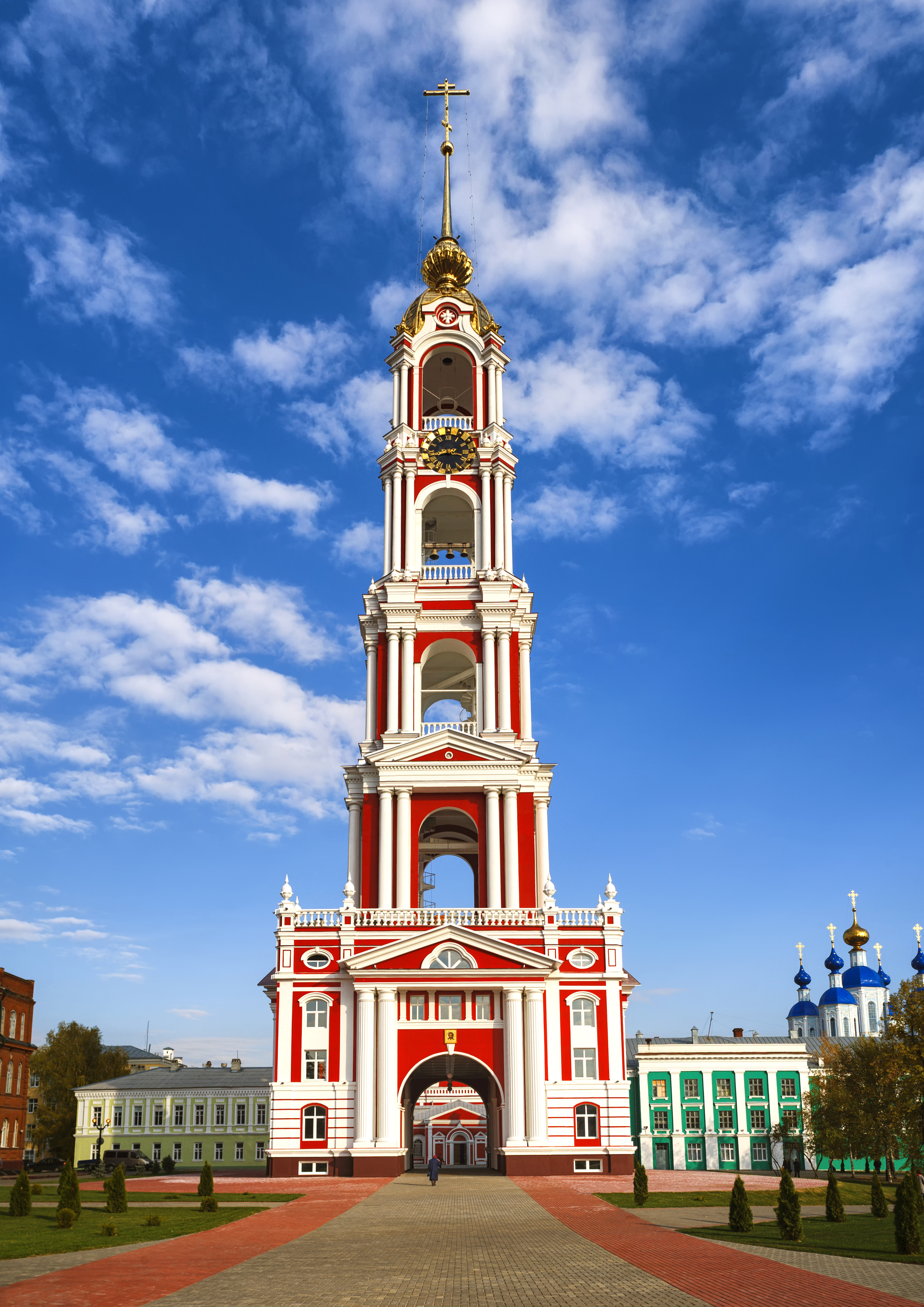
The belltower of the Kazansky Monastery is one of the tallest in the Orthodox world

During the Russo-Ukrainian War, a drone was reported to have struck a gunpowder factory in Tambov.

== Administrative and municipal status ==
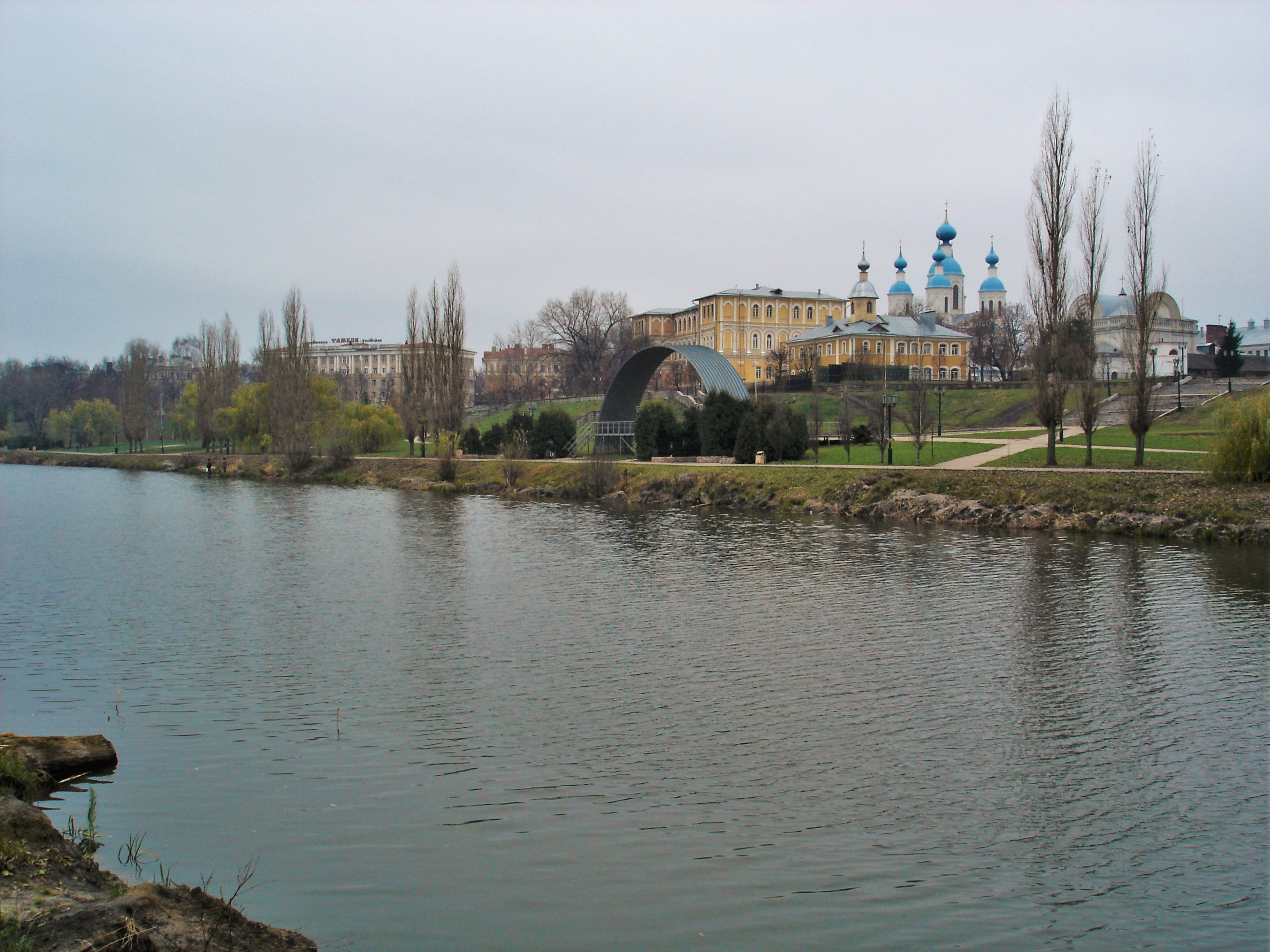
The Tsna River in Tambov

The Administrative divisions of Tambov consists of three districts:

- Leninsky district
- Oktyabrsky district
- Sovetsky district

Tambov serves as the administrative center of the oblast and, within the framework of administrative divisions, it also serves as the administrative center of Tambovsky District, even though it is not a part of it. As an administrative division, it is incorporated as the city of oblast significance of Tambov—an administrative unit with the status equal to that of the districts. As a municipal division, the city of oblast significance of Tambov is incorporated as Tambov Urban Okrug.

== Transportation ==
The city is a large industrial center and is served by Tambov Donskoye Airport. Tambov is also the location of the Tambov air base of the Russian Air Force. A railway connection between Tambov and Moscow was first established in 1871. The railroad goes on to Saratov and is not electrified. There are also small suburban trains, or "rail buses" that connect Tambov Oblast's capital with other cities, such as Michurinsk, Uvarovo, and Kirsanov.

== Climate ==
Tambov has a humid continental climate (Köppen climate classification Dfb). The average temperature of the coldest month (February) is about -8 °C, the warmest month (July) – about +20 °C. Because of the southerly location the average annual temperature in Tambov is about 2 degrees higher than in Moscow. Annual rainfall ranges from 400 to 650 mm, more than half of them (about 270 mm) of precipitation falls in the warm season. Duration of the warm period is 154 days.

Climate data for Tambov (1991–2020, extremes 1845–present)
Month	Jan	Feb	Mar	Apr	May	Jun	Jul	Aug	Sep	Oct	Nov	Dec	Year
Record high °C (°F)	6.6 (43.9)	8.5 (47.3)	19.7 (67.5)	29.7 (85.5)	36.1 (97.0)	38.8 (101.8)	41.1 (106.0)	41.0 (105.8)	35.2 (95.4)	26.5 (79.7)	17.2 (63.0)	11.9 (53.4)	41.1 (106.0)
Mean daily maximum °C (°F)	−4.6 (23.7)	−3.7 (25.3)	2.1 (35.8)	13.6 (56.5)	21.6 (70.9)	24.7 (76.5)	27.1 (80.8)	25.8 (78.4)	19.2 (66.6)	10.8 (51.4)	2.0 (35.6)	−2.9 (26.8)	11.3 (52.3)
Daily mean °C (°F)	−7.5 (18.5)	−7.3 (18.9)	−1.9 (28.6)	7.7 (45.9)	15.0 (59.0)	18.5 (65.3)	20.7 (69.3)	19.1 (66.4)	13.2 (55.8)	6.5 (43.7)	−0.7 (30.7)	−5.6 (21.9)	6.5 (43.7)
Mean daily minimum °C (°F)	−10.5 (13.1)	−10.5 (13.1)	−5.5 (22.1)	2.5 (36.5)	8.7 (47.7)	12.5 (54.5)	14.6 (58.3)	12.9 (55.2)	8.2 (46.8)	3.0 (37.4)	−3.1 (26.4)	−8.3 (17.1)	2.0 (35.6)
Record low °C (°F)	−38 (−36)	−36.9 (−34.4)	−30.4 (−22.7)	−15.3 (4.5)	−5.8 (21.6)	0.5 (32.9)	3.9 (39.0)	1.4 (34.5)	−3.7 (25.3)	−14.7 (5.5)	−29.3 (−20.7)	−36.1 (−33.0)	−38 (−36)
Average precipitation mm (inches)	37 (1.5)	32 (1.3)	29 (1.1)	29 (1.1)	43 (1.7)	66 (2.6)	55 (2.2)	43 (1.7)	44 (1.7)	47 (1.9)	39 (1.5)	39 (1.5)	503 (19.8)
Average extreme snow depth cm (inches)	21 (8.3)	29 (11)	23 (9.1)	2 (0.8)	0 (0)	0 (0)	0 (0)	0 (0)	0 (0)	0 (0)	4 (1.6)	12 (4.7)	29 (11)
Average rainy days	8	6	9	13	14	17	15	13	15	16	13	9	148
Average snowy days	24	21	15	4	0.4	0	0	0	0.2	4	15	23	107
Average relative humidity (%)	85	82	78	67	60	67	68	68	74	81	86	86	75
Mean monthly sunshine hours	59	91	129	186	265	287	292	259	181	108	46	36	1,939
Source 1: Pogoda.ru.net
Source 2: NOAA (sun, 1961–1990)

== Culture ==
The city is home to two universities, Derzhavin Tambov State University and Tambov State Technical University. The Tambov Art Gallery houses a vast collection of canvases by Russian and West-European artists. Russia's oldest drama theater is located in Tambov, as well as two universities, two military colleges, a musical school, a museum of local lore, and other cultural institutions.

In the Russian popular culture has long had a reputation of a gloomy city dangerous for living (which is only partly related to the notorious Tambov Mafia). Since recently, the Tambov Wolf became the city's icon; its origin goes back to the proverb "A wolf from Tambov is your comrade" (i.e. you are no friend to me, you have nothing to do with me).

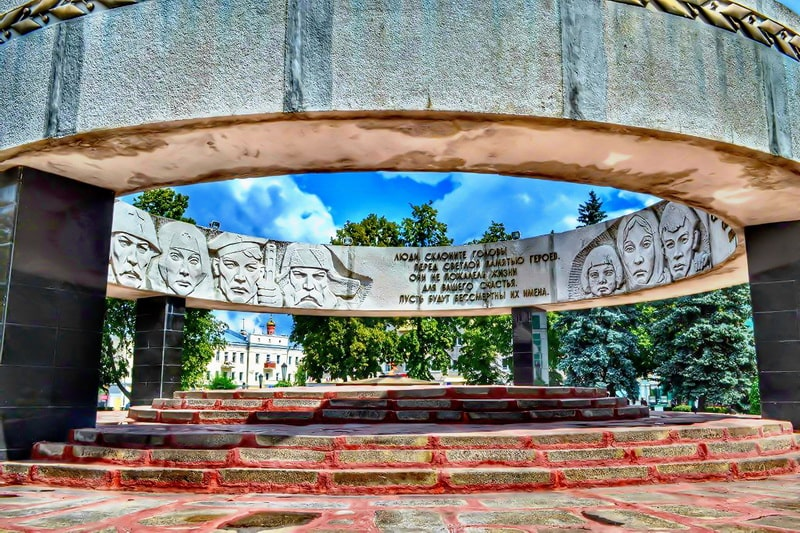
"Eternal Flame" on Sobornaya Square (opened May 9, 1970)

== Sports ==
Tambov's professional association football team FC Tambov played in the Russian Premier League for 2 years, before dissolving in 2021. The team previously known as FC Spartak Tambov, founded in 1960 and dissolved in 2014. A basketball team BK Tambov plays in Russian Superleague, 2nd Division. Ice hockey team is HC Tambov plays in Supreme Hockey League, the second level of ice hockey in Russia.

== Notable people ==
- Victoria Barbă (1926–2020), Moldovan animated film director
- Constantin Fahlberg (1850–1910), a chemist known for artificial sweetener Saccharin
- Nikolay Fyodorov (1829–1903), religious philosopher
- Ida Kar (1908–1974), photographer
- Andrey Kolmogorov (1903–1987), mathematician
- Lev Kuleshov (1899–1970), movie director
- Pavel Kushnir (1984–2024), Russian pianist, writer, and political activist who died in prison during a hunger strike
- Alexander Lodygin (1847–1923), electrical engineer
- Victor Merzhanov (1919–2012), pianist
- Maksim Mysin (born 1979), footballer
- Vladimir Pchelintsev (1919–1997), top Soviet sniper in WW2
- Sergei Rachmaninoff (1873–1943), musician
- Anastasia Rodionova (born 1982), tennis player
- Arina Rodionova (born 1989), tennis player
- Daria Trubnikova (born 2003), rhythmic gymnast
- Yuri Zhirkov (born 1983), football player

Criminal gang

- Tambovskaya Bratva (1988–present), famous Russian criminal gang based in Saint Petersburg

== Twin towns and sister cities ==
Tambov is a sister city of:

- Sokhumi, Abkhazia
- Grodno, Belarus
- Balchik, Bulgaria
- Dobrich, Bulgaria
- Bar-le-Duc, France
- Genoa, Italy
- Alushta, Republic of Crimea, Russia
- Terre Haute, Indiana, United States
