= Satis, Pervomaysk, Nizhny Novgorod Oblast =

Satis Сатис
- Urban-type settlement
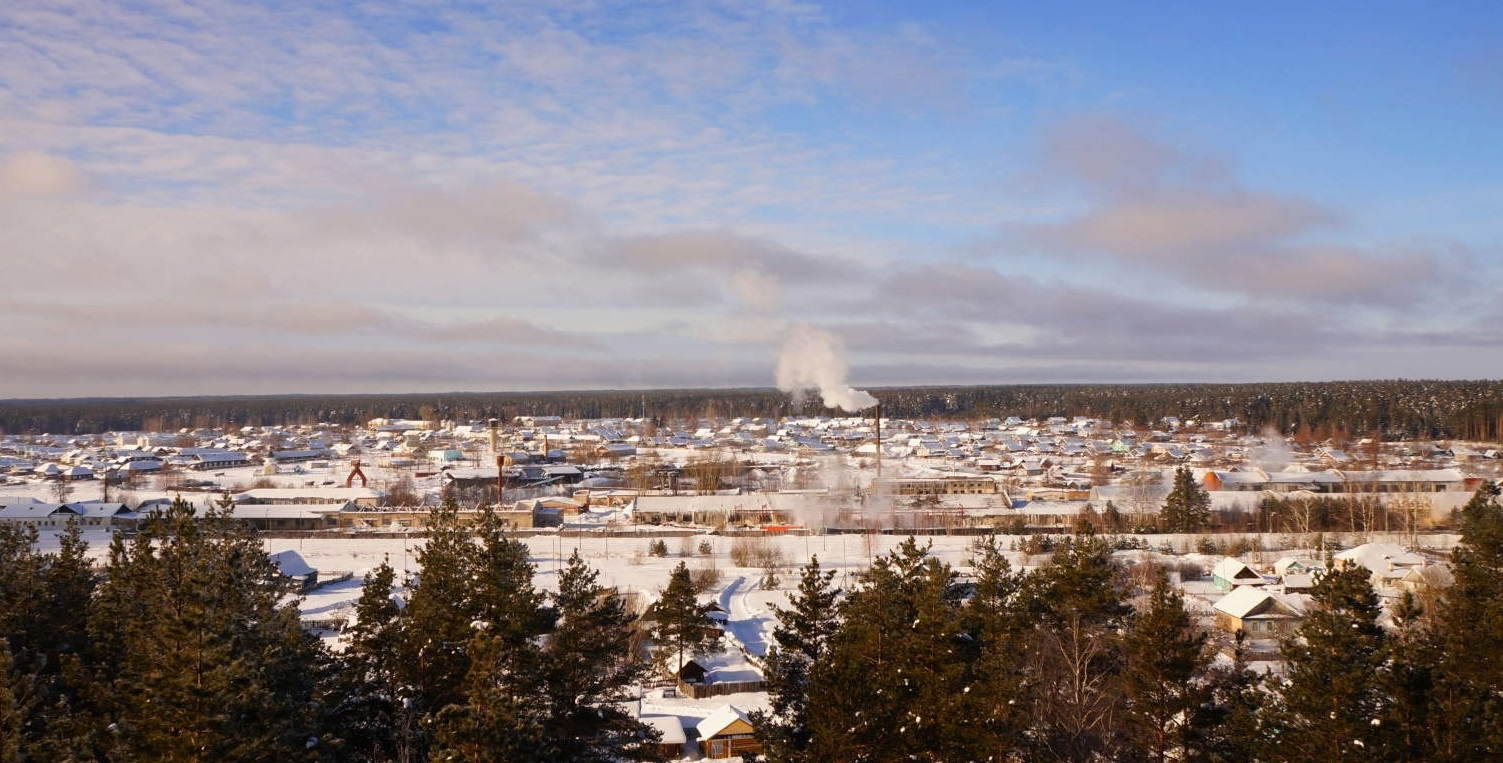
- Interactive map of Satis
- Location of Satis Satis (Nizhny Novgorod Oblast)
- Coordinates: 55.0223°N 43.8180°E
- Country: Russia
- Federal subject: Nizhny Novgorod Oblast

Population (2010 Census)
  - Total: 1,640
  - Estimate (2025): 1,149 (−29.9%)
- Time zone: UTC+3 (MSK)
- Postal code: 607750
- OKTMO ID: 22734000056

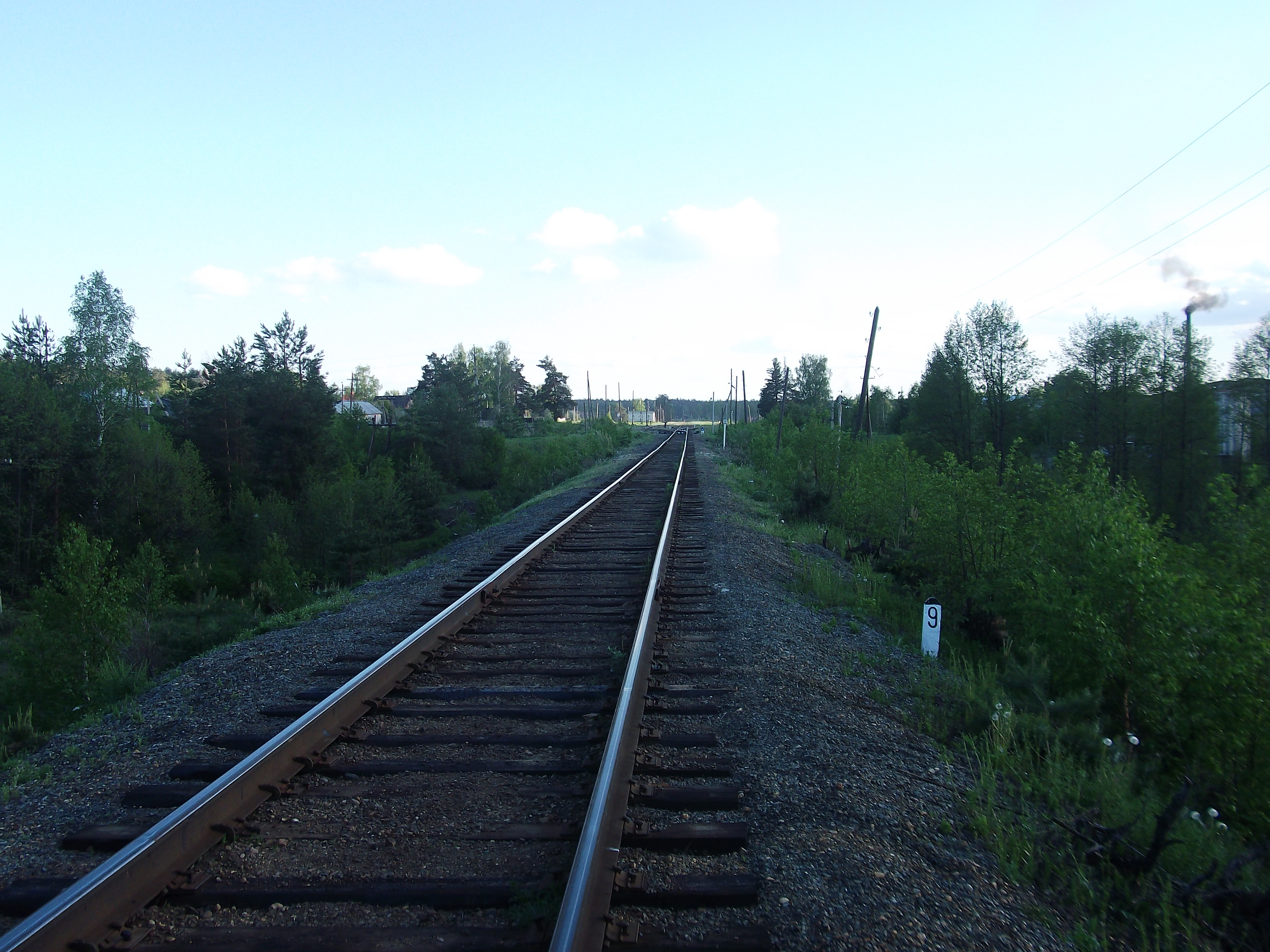

Satis (Russian: Сати́с) is an urban locality (an urban-type settlement) in Nizhny Novgorod Oblast, Russia. Population: 1,640 (2010 census); 1,899 (2002 census); 2,430 (1989 Soviet census).

== History ==
The settlement was based in 1912 by Semen Fedorovich Kundashkin who was a local timber manufacturer and is situated on the bank of the river Satis for which it is named. There is a furniture factory in the locality, built in 1952, and an orthodox church, Church of St.Seraphim of Sarov (2008).

== Climate ==
Satis has a humid continental climate (Köppen climate classification Dfb) with long cold winter starting in mid-November and ending in the first half of April, and warm, often hot dry summers. The warmest month is July with daily mean temperature near +20 °C (68 °F), the coldest month is January −12 °C (10 °F)

== Main sights ==
There is a holy spring located 8 kilometers westwards from the settlement
