= Fakhrabad =

Fakhrabad or Fakher Abad (Persian: فَخر آباد) may refer to:

== Ardabil Province ==
- Fakhrabad, Ardabil, a village in Meshgin Shahr County

== Chaharmahal and Bakhtiari Province ==
- Fakhrabad, Chaharmahal and Bakhtiari, a village in Kuhrang County

== Fars Province ==
- Fakhrabad, Bavanat, a village in Bavanat County
- Fakhrabad, Marvdasht, a village in Marvdasht County
- Fakhrabad, Neyriz, a village in Neyriz County
- Fakhrabad, Qatruyeh, a village in Neyriz County
- Fakhrabad, Sepidan, a village in Sepidan County

== Gilan Province ==
- Fakhrabad, Gilan, a village in Rasht County

== Golestan Province ==
- Fakhrabad, Golestan, a village in Gorgan County

== Hormozgan Province ==
- Fakhrabad, Hajjiabad, a village in Hajjiabad County
- Fakhrabad, Minab, a village in Minab County

== Isfahan Province ==
- Fakhrabad, Aran va Bidgol, a village in Aran va Bidgol County
- Fakhrabad, Mobarakeh, a village in Mobarakeh County

== Kerman Province ==
- Fakhrabad, Baft, a village in Baft County
- Fakhrabad, Bardsir, a village in Bardsir County
- Fakhrabad 1, a village in Kerman County
- Fakhrabad, Rafsanjan, a village in Rafsanjan County
- Fakhrabad, Sirjan, a village in Sirjan County

== Kurdistan Province ==
- Fakhrabad, Kurdistan, a village in Qorveh County

== Lorestan Province ==
- Fakhrabad-e Olya, a village in Lorestan Province, Iran
- Farrokhabad-e Olya, Kuhdasht, a village in Lorestan Province, Iran
- Farrokhabad-e Sofla, a village in Lorestan Province, Iran

== Razavi Khorasan Province ==
- Fakhrabad, Bajestan, a village in Bajestan County
- Fakhrabad, Mashhad, a village in Mashhad County
- Fakhrabad, Nishapur, a village in Nishapur County
- Fakhrabad, Quchan, a village in Quchan County
- Fakhrabad, Torbat-e Heydarieh, a village in Torbat-e Heydarieh County

== South Khorasan Province ==
- Fakhrabad, Khusf, a village in Khusf County
- Fakhrabad, Qaleh Zari, a village in Khusf County
- Fakhrabad, Zirkuh, a village in Zirkuh County

== Tehran Province ==
- Fakhrabad, Tehran, a village in Varamin County

== Yazd Province ==
- Fakhrabad, Ardakan, a village in Ardakan County
- Fakhrabad, Mehriz, a village in Mehriz County
- Fakhrabad, Taft, a village in Taft County
