= Farrokhabad =

Farrokhabad (Persian: فرخ اباد) may refer to various places in Iran:

== Alborz province ==
- Farrokhabad, Alborz, a village in Fardis County
- Farrokhabad Rural District, an administrative division of Fardis County

== Chaharmahal and Bakhtiari province ==
- Farrokhabad, Chaharmahal and Bakhtiari, a village in Kuhrang County

== Ilam province ==
- Farrokhabad, Central, a village in the Central District of Dehloran County
- Farrokhabad, Zarrinabad, a village in Zarrinabad District of Dehloran County

== Kerman province ==
- Farrokhabad, Anbarabad, a village in Anbarabad County
- Farrokhabad, Esmaili, a village in Jiroft County
- Farrokhabad, Rafsanjan, a village in Rafsanjan County

== Lorestan province ==
- Farrokhabad-e Olya, Delfan, a village in Delfan County
- Farrokhabad-e Olya, Kuhdasht, a village in Kuhdasht County
- Farrokhabad-e Sofla, a village in Kuhdasht County

== Razavi Khorasan province ==
- Farrokhabad, Mashhad, a village in Mashhad County
- Farrokhabad, Nishapur, a village in Nishapur County

== See also ==
- Farrukhabad, a city in India
