= Patak =

Patak may refer to:

== Places ==
Hungary

- Patak, Hungary

Iran

- Patak, Ilam, a village in Ilam Province
- Patak-e Arab, "Arab Patak", a village in Ilam Province
- Patak-e Bajgan, a village in Kerman Province
- Patak-e Beygdeli, a village in Khuzestan Province
- Patak-e Jalali, a village in Khuzestan Province
- Kohneh Patak, "Old Patak", a village in Mazandaran Province
- Tazeh Patak, "New Patak", a village in Mazandaran Province

== People with the surname ==
- Evan Patak (born 1984), American volleyball player
- Matej Paták (born 1990), Slovak volleyball player

== See also ==
- Patak's, a former spice company, now a brand of the Associated British Foods group
- Pataki (disambiguation)
