= Gurab-e Sofla, Dehloran =

Village in Ilam province, Iran

Gurab-e Sofla Persian: گوراب سفلي
- Village
- Location within Iran Location within Ilam Province
- Coordinates: 33°11′02″N 46°58′01″E
- Country: Iran
- Province: Ilam
- County: Dehloran
- District: Sarab Meymeh
- Rural District: Gurab

Population (2016)
  - Total: 307
- Time zone: UTC+3:30 (IRST)

Gurab-e Sofla (Persian: گوراب سفلي) (Note: Also romanized as Gūrāb-e Soflá; also known as Gūrab-e Pā’īn) is a village in Gurab Rural District of Sarab Meymeh District, Dehloran County, Ilam province, Iran.

== Demographics ==
=== Ethnicity ===
The village is populated by Kurds.

=== Population ===
At the time of the 2006 National Census, the village's population was 332 in 59 households, when it was in Seyd Nasr ol Din Rural District of Zarrinabad District. The following census in 2011 counted 338 people in 75 households. The 2016 census measured the population of the village as 307 people in 82 households, by which time the village had been separated from the district in the formation of Sarab Meymeh District. Gurab-e Sofla was transferred to Gurab Rural District created in the new district. It was the most populous village in its rural district.
