= Gurab-e Olya, Dehloran =

Village in Ilam province, Iran

Gurab-e Olya Persian: گوراب عليا
- Village
- Location within Iran Location within Ilam Province
- Coordinates: 33°11′51″N 46°58′32″E
- Country: Iran
- Province: Ilam
- County: Dehloran
- District: Sarab Meymeh
- Rural District: Gurab

Population (2016)
  - Total: 261
- Time zone: UTC+3:30 (IRST)

Gurab-e Olya (Persian: گوراب عليا) (Note: Also romanized as Gūrāb-e ‘Olyā; also known as Gūrab-e Bālā) is a village in, and the capital of, Gurab Rural District of Sarab Meymeh District, Dehloran County, Ilam province, Iran.

== Demographics ==
=== Ethnicity ===
The village is populated by Kurds.

=== Population ===
At the time of the 2006 National Census, the village's population was 278 in 59 households, when it was in Seyd Nasr ol Din Rural District of Zarrinabad District. The following census in 2011 counted 297 people in 77 households. The 2016 census measured the population of the village as 261 people in 73 households, by which time the village had been separated from the district in the formation of Sarab Meymeh District. Gurab-e Olya was transferred to Gurab Rural District created in the new district.
