= Naqdi =

Naqdi or Noqdi (Persian: نقدی), also rendered as Naghdi or Nugdi or Noqdeh, may refer to:

- Naqdi-ye Olya, Ardabil Province
- Naqdi-ye Sofla, Ardabil Province
- Naqdi Rural District, in Ardabil Province
- Noqadi, East Azerbaijan Province
- Naqdi, Hamadan
- Sohrab Khan Gorji, treasurer (Naqdi) of Qajar court
