= Takhtan =

Village in Ilam province, Iran

Takhtan Persian: گوراب سفلي
- Village
- Location within Iran Location within Ilam Province
- Coordinates: 33°08′39″N 47°03′18″E
- Country: Iran
- Province: Ilam
- County: Dehloran
- District: Sarab Meymeh
- Rural District: Takhtan

Population (2016)
  - Total: 161
- Time zone: UTC+3:30 (IRST)

Takhtan (Persian: تختان) (Note: Also romanized as Takhtān; also known as Āb Takhtān) is a village in, and the capital of, Takhtan Rural District of Sarab Meymeh District, Dehloran County, Ilam province, Iran.

== Demographics ==
=== Ethnicity ===
The village is populated by Kurds.

=== Population ===
At the time of the 2006 National Census, the village's population was 150 in 27 households, when it was in Seyd Ebrahim Rural District of Zarrinabad District. The following census in 2011 counted 258 people in 52 households. The 2016 census measured the population of the village as 161 people in 45 households, by which time the village had been separated from the district in the formation of Sarab Meymeh District. Takhtan was transferred to Takhtan Rural District created in the new district. It was the most populous village in its rural district.
