= Abughoveyr =

Village in Ilam province, Iran

Abughoveyr Persian: ابوغوير
- Village
- Location within Iran Location within Ilam Province
- Coordinates: 32°15′34″N 47°43′06″E
- Country: Iran
- Province: Ilam
- County: Dehloran
- District: Dasht-e Abbas
- Rural District: Abughoveyr

Population (2016)
  - Total: 320
- Time zone: UTC+3:30 (IRST)

Abughoveyr (Persian: ابوغوير) (Note: Also romanized as Abu Ghoveyr, Abū Ghoveyr, Abū Ghūyer, and Abūghovīr; also known as Abu Qoveyr and Abū Qūyer) is a village in, and the capital of, Abughoveyr Rural District of Dasht-e Abbas District, Dehloran County, Ilam province, Iran.

== Demographics ==
=== Language ===
The village is populated by Arabs.

=== Population ===
At the time of the 2006 National Census, the village's population was 340 in 56 households, when it was in Musiyan District. The following census in 2011 counted 313 people in 72 households. The 2016 census measured the population of the village as 320 people in 67 households. It was the most populous village in its rural district.

In 2017, the rural district was separated from the district in the formation of Dasht-e Abbas District.
