= Faqirabad =

Faqirabad (Persian: فقيراباد) may refer to:

- Faqirabad, Kerman
- Faqirabad, Khash, Sistan and Baluchestan Province

== See also ==
- Faqeerabad, Peshawar, Pakistan
- Fakhrabad (disambiguation)
