= Shahrak-e Vahdat =

Shahrak-e Vahdat or Shahrakvahdat (Persian: شهرك وحدت) may refer to:

- Shahrak-e Vahdat, Golestan
- Shahrak-e Vahdat, Ilam
- Shahrak-e Vahdat, Khuzestan
- Shahrak-e Vahdat, Kurdistan
