= Shahrak-e Vali-ye Asr, Ilam =

Village in Ilam province, Iran

Shahrak-e Vali-ye Asr Persian: شهرك ولي عصر
- Village
- Location within Iran Location within Ilam Province
- Coordinates: 32°19′18″N 47°54′37″E
- Country: Iran
- Province: Ilam
- County: Dehloran
- District: Dasht-e Abbas
- Rural District: Dasht-e Abbas

Population (2016)
  - Total: 942
- Time zone: UTC+3:30 (IRST)

Shahrak-e Vali-ye Asr (Persian: شهرك ولي عصر) (Note: Also romanized as Shahrak-e Valī-ye ‘Aşr; also known as Ḩasan Barbūtī, Tal, Tel, and Valī-ye ‘Aşr) is a village in Dasht-e Abbas Rural District of Dasht-e Abbas District, Dehloran County, Ilam province, Iran.

== Demographics ==
=== Language ===
The village is populated by Arabs.

=== Population ===
At the time of the 2006 National Census, the village's population was 842 in 127 households, when it was in Musiyan District. The following census in 2011 counted 943 people in 195 households. The 2016 census measured the population of the village as 942 people in 216 households. It was the most populous village in its rural district.

In 2017, the rural district was separated from the district in the formation of Dasht-e Abbas District.
