= Shakheh =

Shakheh شاخه
- Village
- Location within Iran
- Coordinates: 32°11′45″N 47°45′08″E
- Country: Iran
- Province: Ilam
- County: Dehloran
- Bakhsh: Musian
- Rural District: Abu Ghoveyr

Population (2006)
  - Total: 142
- Time zone: UTC+3:30 (IRST)
  - Summer (DST): UTC+4:30 (IRDT)

Shakheh (Persian: شاخه, also Romanized as Shākheh) is a village in Abu Ghoveyr Rural District, Musian District, Dehloran County, Ilam Province, Iran. At the 2006 census, its population was 142, in 19 families. The village is populated by Arabs.
