= Sheykh Saleh Qandi =

Sheykh Saleh Qandi شيخ صالح قندي
- Village
- Country: Iran
- Province: Ilam
- County: Dehloran
- Bakhsh: Musian
- Rural District: Abu Ghoveyr

Population (2006)
  - Total: 518
- Time zone: UTC+3:30 (IRST)
  - Summer (DST): UTC+4:30 (IRDT)

Sheykh Saleh Qandi (Persian: شيخ صالح قندي, also Romanized as Sheykh Şāleḩ Qandī) is a village in Abu Ghoveyr Rural District, Musian District, Dehloran County, Ilam Province, Iran. At the 2006 census, its population was 518, in 98 families. The village is populated by Arabs.
