= Maz Abd Ali-ye Pain =

Maz Abd Ali-ye Pain مازعبدعلي پايين
- Village
- Location within Iran
- Coordinates: 32°45′11″N 47°04′40″E
- Country: Iran
- Province: Ilam
- County: Dehloran
- Bakhsh: Central
- Rural District: Anaran

Population (2006)
  - Total: 214
- Time zone: UTC+3:30 (IRST)
  - Summer (DST): UTC+4:30 (IRDT)

Maz Abd Ali-ye Pain (Persian: مازعبدعلي پايين, also Romanized as Māz ‘Abd ‘Alī-ye Pā’īn; also known as Māz ‘Abd ol ‘Alī-ye Pā’īn) is a village in Anaran Rural District, in the Central District of Dehloran County, Ilam Province, Iran. At the 2006 census, its population was 214, in 38 families. The village is populated by Lurs.
