= Bisheh Deraz =

Village in Ilam province, Iran

Bisheh Deraz Persian: بیشه‌دراز
- Village
- Location within Iran Location within Ilam Province
- Coordinates: 32°49′29″N 46°58′26″E
- Country: Iran
- Province: Ilam
- County: Dehloran
- District: Central
- Rural District: Anaran

Population (2016)
  - Total: 230
- Time zone: UTC+3:30 (IRST)

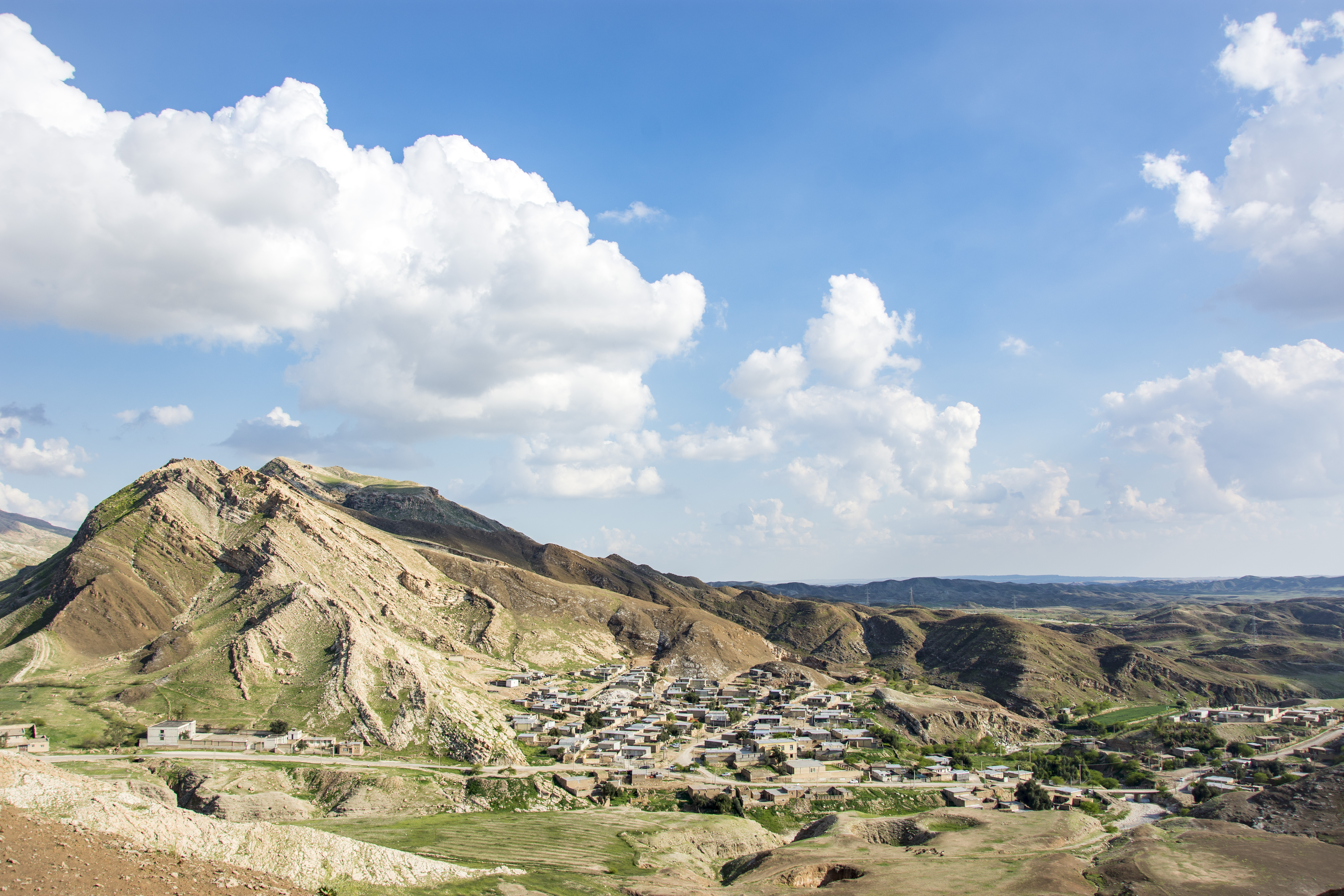
Bisheh Deraz

Bisheh Deraz (Persian: بیشه‌دراز) (Note: Also romanized as Bīsheh Derāz and Bīsheh Darāz; also known as Beshādarāz) is a village in, and the capital of, Anaran Rural District of the Central District of Dehloran County, Ilam province, Iran.

== Demographics ==
=== Ethnicity ===
The village is populated by Kurds.

=== Population ===
At the time of the 2006 National Census, the village's population was 577 in 117 households. The following census in 2011 counted 418 people in 100 households. The 2016 census measured the population of the village as 230 people in 69 households.
