= Farrokhabad, Central =

Farrokhabad فرخ اباد
- Village
- Location within Iran
- Coordinates: 32°38′58″N 47°14′46″E
- Country: Iran
- Province: Ilam
- County: Dehloran
- Bakhsh: Central
- Rural District: Anaran

Population (2006)
  - Total: 643
- Time zone: UTC+3:30 (IRST)
  - Summer (DST): UTC+4:30 (IRDT)

Farrokhabad (Persian: فرخ اباد, also Romanized as Farrokhābād) is a village in Anaran Rural District, in the Central District of Dehloran County, Ilam Province, Iran. At the 2006 census, its population was 643, in 96 families. The village is populated by Lurs.
