= Gurab Rural District =

Rural district in Ilam province, Iran

Gurab Rural District Persian: دهستان گوراب
- Rural District
- Location within Iran Location within Ilam Province
- Coordinates: 33°13′44″N 46°55′32″E
- Country: Iran
- Province: Ilam
- County: Dehloran
- District: Sarab Meymeh
- Capital: Gurab-e Olya

Population (2016)
  - Total: 626
- Time zone: UTC+3:30 (IRST)

Gurab Rural District (Persian: دهستان گوراب) is in Sarab Meymeh District of Dehloran County, Ilam province, Iran. Its capital is the village of Gurab-e Olya.

== History ==
In 2013, the city of Meymeh and several villages were separated from Zarrinabad District in the establishment of Sarab Meymeh District, and Gurab Rural District was created in the new district.

== Demographics ==
=== Population ===
At the time of the 2016 National Census, the rural district's population was 626 in 169 households. The most populous of its six villages was Gurab-e Sofla, with 307 people.
