= Farrokhabad, Zarrinabad =

Farrokhabad فرخ اباد
- Village
- Location within Iran
- Coordinates: 32°39′13″N 47°13′10″E
- Country: Iran
- Province: Ilam
- County: Dehloran
- Bakhsh: Zarrinabad
- Rural District: Seyyed Nasereddin

Population (2006)
  - Total: 61
- Time zone: UTC+3:30 (IRST)
  - Summer (DST): UTC+4:30 (IRDT)

Farrokhabad (Persian: فرخ اباد, also Romanized as Farrokhābād; also known as Farrokhābād-e Bālā) is a village in Seyyed Nasereddin Rural District, Zarrinabad District, Dehloran County, Ilam Province, Iran. At the 2006 census, its population was 61, in 12 families. The village is populated by Kurds.
