= Marzabad =

Marzabad or Merzabad (Persian: مرزاباد) may refer to:

- Marzabad, Khoda Afarin, East Azerbaijan Province
- Marzabad, Varzaqan, East Azerbaijan Province
- Marzabad, Ilam
- Marzabad, South Khorasan
