= Kharbozan-e Bala =

Kharbozan-e Bala خربزان بالا
- Village
- Location within Iran
- Coordinates: 33°05′15″N 47°00′52″E
- Country: Iran
- Province: Ilam
- County: Dehloran
- Bakhsh: Zarrinabad
- Rural District: Seyyed Ebrahim

Population (2006)
  - Total: 151
- Time zone: UTC+3:30 (IRST)
  - Summer (DST): UTC+4:30 (IRDT)

Kharbozan-e Bala (Persian: خربزان بالا, also Romanized as Kharbozān-e Bālā; also known as Kharbozān) is a village in Seyyed Ebrahim Rural District, Zarrinabad District, Dehloran County, Ilam Province, Iran. At the 2006 census, its population was 151, in 32 families. The village is populated by Kurds.
