= Cham Sorkh, Ilam =

Cham Sorkh چمسرخ
- Village
- Country: Iran
- Province: Ilam
- County: Dehloran
- Bakhsh: Zarrinabad
- Rural District: Seyyed Ebrahim

Population (2006)
  - Total: 115
- Time zone: UTC+3:30 (IRST)
  - Summer (DST): UTC+4:30 (IRDT)

Cham Sorkh (Persian: چمسرخ) is a village in Seyyed Ebrahim Rural District, Zarrinabad District, Dehloran County, Ilam Province, Iran. At the 2006 census, its population was 115, in 17 families. The village is populated by Kurds.
