= Sar Kamar, Dehloran =

Sar Kamar سركمر
- Village
- Location within Iran
- Coordinates: 32°59′06″N 46°58′27″E
- Country: Iran
- Province: Ilam
- County: Dehloran
- Bakhsh: Zarrinabad
- Rural District: Seyyed Ebrahim

Population (2006)
  - Total: 144
- Time zone: UTC+3:30 (IRST)
  - Summer (DST): UTC+4:30 (IRDT)

Sar Kamar (Persian: سركمر) is a village in Seyyed Ebrahim Rural District, Zarrinabad District, Dehloran County, Ilam Province, Iran. At the 2006 census, its population was 144, in 26 families. The village is populated by Kurds.
