= Takhtan Rural District =

Rural district in Ilam province, Iran

Takhtan Rural District Persian: دهستان تختان
- Rural District
- Location within Iran Location within Ilam Province
- Coordinates: 33°10′14″N 47°02′19″E
- Country: Iran
- Province: Ilam
- County: Dehloran
- District: Sarab Meymeh
- Capital: Takhtan

Population (2016)
  - Total: 227
- Time zone: UTC+3:30 (IRST)

Takhtan Rural District (Persian: دهستان تختان) is in Sarab Meymeh District of Dehloran County, Ilam province, Iran. Its capital is the village of Takhtan.

== History ==
In 2013, the city of Meymeh and several villages were separated from Zarrinabad District in the establishment of Sarab Meymeh District, and Takhtan Rural District was created in the new district.

== Demographics ==
=== Population ===
At the time of the 2016 National Census, the rural district's population was 227 in 60 households. The most populous of its two villages was Takhtan, with 161 people.
