= Patak-e Arab =

Patak-e Arab پتك اعراب
- Village
- Location within Iran
- Coordinates: 32°29′54″N 47°30′59″E
- Country: Iran
- Province: Ilam
- County: Dehloran
- Bakhsh: Musian
- Rural District: Nahr-e Anbar

Population (2006)
  - Total: 636
- Time zone: UTC+3:30 (IRST)
  - Summer (DST): UTC+4:30 (IRDT)

Patak-e Arab (Persian: پتك اعراب, also Romanized as Patak-e A‘rāb) is a village in Nahr-e Anbar Rural District, Musian District, Dehloran County, Ilam Province, Iran. At the 2006 census, its population was 636, in 96 families. The village is populated by Arabs.
