= Kharbozan =

Kharbozan (Persian: خربزان) may refer to:

- Kharbozan-e Bala
- Kharbozan-e Pain
