= Emamzadeh Abbas, Ilam =

Emamzadeh Abbas امامزاده عباس
- Village
- Location within Iran
- Coordinates: 32°25′00″N 47°48′00″E
- Country: Iran
- Province: Ilam
- County: Dehloran
- Bakhsh: Musian
- Rural District: Dasht-e Abbas

Population (2006)
  - Total: 85
- Time zone: UTC+3:30 (IRST)
  - Summer (DST): UTC+4:30 (IRDT)

Emamzadeh Abbas (Persian: امامزاده عباس, also Romanized as Emāmzādeh ‘Abbās) is a village in Dasht-e Abbas Rural District, Musian District, Dehloran County, Ilam Province, Iran. At the 2006 census, its population was 85, in 15 families.
