= Bahar Ab =

Bahar Ab or Baharab (Persian: بهاراب) may refer to:

- Baharab, Hamadan
- Bahar Ab, Ilam

== See also ==
- Ab Bahar
