= Jamush Olan =

Jamush Olan (Persian: جاموش اولن), also rendered as Gavmish Owlan, may refer to:

- Jamush Olan-e Olya
- Jamush Olan-e Sofla
