= Kharbozan-e Pain =

Kharbozan-e Pain خربزان پايين
- Village
- Location within Iran
- Coordinates: 33°05′15″N 47°00′52″E
- Country: Iran
- Province: Ilam
- County: Dehloran
- Bakhsh: Zarrinabad
- Rural District: Seyyed Ebrahim

Population (2006)
  - Total: 83
- Time zone: UTC+3:30 (IRST)
  - Summer (DST): UTC+4:30 (IRDT)

Kharbozan-e Pain (Persian: خربزان پايين, also Romanized as Kharbozān-e Pā’īn; also known as Kharbozān) is a village in Seyyed Ebrahim Rural District, Zarrinabad District, Dehloran County, Ilam Province, Iran. At the 2006 census, its population was 83, in 14 families. The village is populated by Kurds.
