= Anqolab-e Yek =

Coordinates: 32°43′48″N 47°11′38″E

Anqolab-e Yek انقلاب 1
- Village
- Interactive map of Anqolab-e Yek
- Country: Iran
- Province: Ilam
- County: Dehloran
- Bakhsh: Central
- Rural District: Anaran

Population (2006)
  - Total: 402
- Time zone: UTC+3:30 (IRST)
  - Summer (DST): UTC+4:30 (IRDT)

Anqolab-e Yek (Persian: انقلاب 1, also Romanized as Ānqolāb-e Yek) is a village in Anaran Rural District, in the Central District of Dehloran County, Ilam Province, Iran. At the 2006 census, its population was 402, in 80 families.
