= Shahrak-e Sadat =

Shahrak-e Sadat شهرك سادات
- Village
- Location within Iran
- Coordinates: 32°25′21″N 47°44′38″E
- Country: Iran
- Province: Ilam
- County: Dehloran
- Bakhsh: Musian
- Rural District: Dasht-e Abbas

Population (2006)
  - Total: 232
- Time zone: UTC+3:30 (IRST)
  - Summer (DST): UTC+4:30 (IRDT)

Shahrak-e Sadat (Persian: شهرك سادات, also Romanized as Shahrak-e Sādāt; also known as Sādāt and Sharafeh) is a village in Dasht-e Abbas Rural District, Musian District, Dehloran County, Ilam Province, Iran. At the 2006 census, its population was 232, in 31 families.
