= Borom-e Pain =

Borom-e Pain برم پائين
- Village
- Location within Iran
- Coordinates: 32°28′15″N 47°47′10″E
- Country: Iran
- Province: Ilam
- County: Dehloran
- Bakhsh: Musian
- Rural District: Dasht-e Abbas

Population (2006)
  - Total: 470
- Time zone: UTC+3:30 (IRST)
  - Summer (DST): UTC+4:30 (IRDT)

Borom-e Pain (Persian: برم پائين, also Romanized as Borom-e Pā'īn; also known as Borowm) is a village in Dasht-e Abbas Rural District, Musian District, Dehloran County, Ilam Province, Iran. At the 2006 census, its population was 470, in 68 families. The village is populated by Arabs.
