= Arjaq =

Village in Ardabil province, Iran

Arjaq Persian: ارجق
- Village
- Location within Iran
- Coordinates: 38°31′35″N 47°53′35″E
- Country: Iran
- Province: Ardabil
- County: Meshgin Shahr
- District: Meshgin-e Sharqi
- Rural District: Qarah Su

Population (2016)
  - Total: 412
- Time zone: UTC+3:30 (IRST)

Arjaq (Persian: ارجق) (Note: Also known as Archaq and Arjagh) is a village in Qarah Su Rural District of Meshgin-e Sharqi District in Meshgin Shahr County, Ardabil province, Iran.

== Demographics ==
=== Population ===
At the time of the 2006 National Census, the village's population was 573 in 170 households. The following census in 2011 counted 546 people in 180 households. The 2016 census measured the population of the village as 412 people in 143 households.

== In literature ==
The 14th-century author Hamdallah Mustawfi mentioned it in his Nuzhat al-Qulub, as Arjāq, as one of the seven cities in the tuman of Pishkin. He said that it had been founded by the Sasanian king Qubād after his father Fīrūz had founded the nearby city of Anād. He described both cities as having temperate climates, being watered by streams coming down from Mount Sabalan, and having rich gardens that produced fruits, grapes, melons, and nuts abundantly. The two were collectively assessed at a tax revenue of 7,000 dinars.
