= Balata, Iran =

Balata بلتا
- Village
- Location within Iran
- Coordinates: 32°21′28″N 47°59′34″E
- Country: Iran
- Province: Ilam
- County: Dehloran
- Bakhsh: Musian
- Rural District: Dasht-e Abbas

Population (2006)
  - Total: 108
- Time zone: UTC+3:30 (IRST)
  - Summer (DST): UTC+4:30 (IRDT)

Balata (Persian: بلتا, also Romanized as Balatā) is a village in Dasht-e Abbas Rural District, Musian District, Dehloran County, Ilam Province, Iran. At the 2006 census, its population was 108, in 14 families. The village is populated by Arabs.
