= Farrokhabad-e Olya =

Farrokhabad-e Olya (Persian: فرخ ابادعليا) may refer to:

- Farrokhabad-e Olya, Delfan
- Farrokhabad-e Olya, Kuhdasht
