= Sar Kamar =

Sar Kamar or Sarkamar (Persian: سركمر) may refer to:

- Sar Kamar, Chaharmahal and Bakhtiari
- Sar Kamar, Dehloran, Ilam Province
