= Zafarani, Iran =

Zafarani زعفراني
- Village
- Location within Iran
- Coordinates: 32°57′53″N 46°37′34″E
- Country: Iran
- Province: Ilam
- County: Dehloran
- Bakhsh: Zarrinabad
- Rural District: Seyyed Nasereddin

Population (2006)
  - Total: 23
- Time zone: UTC+3:30 (IRST)
  - Summer (DST): UTC+4:30 (IRDT)

Zafarani (Persian: زعفراني, also Romanized as Za‘farānī) is a village in Seyyed Nasereddin Rural District, Zarrinabad District, Dehloran County, Ilam Province, Iran. At the 2006 census, its population was 23, in 4 families. The village is populated by Kurds.
