= Emamzadeh Abbas =

Emamzadeh Abbas or Imamzadeh Abbas (Persian: امامزاده عباس) may refer to:

- Emamzadeh Abbas, Ilam
- Emamzadeh Abbas, Kermanshah
- Emamzadeh Abbas, Markazi
- Emamzadeh Abbas, Mazandaran
- Imamzadeh Abbas, Sari
