= Anqolab =

Anqolab (Persian: انقلاب) may refer to:

- Anqolab 1
- Anqolab 2
