= Shahrak-e Esteqlal, Ilam =

Shahrak-e Esteqlal شهرك استقلال
- Village
- Location within Iran
- Coordinates: 32°23′27″N 47°53′44″E
- Country: Iran
- Province: Ilam
- County: Dehloran
- Bakhsh: Musian
- Rural District: Dasht-e Abbas

Population (2006)
  - Total: 459
- Time zone: UTC+3:30 (IRST)
  - Summer (DST): UTC+4:30 (IRDT)

Shahrak-e Esteqlal (Persian: شهرك استقلال, also Romanized as Shahrak-e Esteqlāl; also known as Esteqlāl) is a village in Dasht-e Abbas Rural District, Musian District, Dehloran County, Ilam Province, Iran. At the 2006 census, its population was 459, in 79 families.
