= Bardi, Iran =

Village in Ilam province, Iran

Bardi Persian: بردي
- Village
- Location within Iran Location within Ilam Province
- Coordinates: 33°00′21″N 46°56′27″E
- Country: Iran
- Province: Ilam
- County: Dehloran
- District: Zarrinabad
- Rural District: Seyd Ebrahim

Population (2016)
  - Total: 771
- Time zone: UTC+3:30 (IRST)

Bardi (Persian: بردي) (Note: Also romanized as Bardī) is a village in, and the capital of, Seyd Ebrahim Rural District of Zarrinabad District, Dehloran County, Ilam province, Iran.

== Demographics ==
=== Ethnicity ===
The village is populated by Kurds.

=== Population ===
At the time of the 2006 National Census, the village's population was 853 in 165 households. The following census in 2011 counted 758 people in 161 households. The 2016 census measured the population of the village as 771 people in 210 households. It was the most populous village in its rural district.
