= Maz Abd Ali =

Maz Abd Ali (Persian: مازعبدلي) may refer to:

- Maz Abd Ali-ye Bala
- Maz Abd Ali-ye Pain
