= Maz Abd Ali-ye Bala =

Maz Abd Ali-ye Bala مازعبدلي بالا
- Village
- Location within Iran
- Coordinates: 32°46′11″N 47°04′02″E
- Country: Iran
- Province: Ilam
- County: Dehloran
- Bakhsh: Central
- Rural District: Anaran

Population (2006)
  - Total: 114
- Time zone: UTC+3:30 (IRST)
  - Summer (DST): UTC+4:30 (IRDT)

Maz Abd Ali-ye Bala (Persian: مازعبدلي بالا, also Romanized as Māz 'Abd 'Alī-ye Bālā; also known as Māz 'Abd ol 'Alī-ye Bālā and Māzbadālī) is a village in Anaran Rural District, in the Central District of Dehloran County, Ilam Province, Iran. At the 2006 census, its population was 114, in 17 families. The village is populated by Lurs.
