= Cham Sorkh =

Cham Sorkh (Persian: چم سرخ) may refer to:

- Cham Sorkh, Ilam
- Cham Sorkh, Kermanshah
