= Zarab, Ilam =

Village in Ilam province, Iran

Zarab Persian: زراب
- Village
- Location within Iran Location within Ilam Province
- Coordinates: 33°05′28″N 46°54′30″E
- Country: Iran
- Province: Ilam
- County: Dehloran
- District: Zarrinabad
- Rural District: Seyd Nasraldin

Population (2016)
  - Total: 440
- Time zone: UTC+3:30 (IRST)

Zarab (Persian: زراب) (Note: Also romanized as Zar Āb and Ẕarāb) is a village in Seyd Nasraldin Rural District of Zarrinabad District, Dehloran County, Ilam province, Iran.

== Demographics ==
=== Ethnicity ===
The village is populated by Kurds.

=== Population ===
At the time of the 2006 National Census, the village's population was 404 in 78 households. The following census in 2011 counted 339 people in 69 households. The 2016 census measured the population of the village as 440 people in 105 households. It was the most populous village in its rural district.
