= Patak, Ilam =

Patak پتك
- Village
- Location within Iran
- Coordinates: 32°32′19″N 47°24′36″E
- Country: Iran
- Province: Ilam
- County: Dehloran
- Bakhsh: Musian
- Rural District: Nahr-e Anbar

Population (2006)
  - Total: 556
- Time zone: UTC+3:30 (IRST)
  - Summer (DST): UTC+4:30 (IRDT)

Patak (Persian: پتك, also Romanized as Patk; also known as Patak-e Dīnārvand) is a village in Nahr-e Anbar Rural District, Musian District, Dehloran County, Ilam Province, Iran. At the 2006 census, its population was 556, in 109 families.
