= Jalizi-ye Bala =

Village in Ilam province, Iran

Jalizi-ye Bala Persian: جليزي بالا
- Village
- Location within Iran Location within Ilam Province
- Coordinates: 32°28′14″N 47°34′01″E
- Country: Iran
- Province: Ilam
- County: Dehloran
- District: Musiyan
- Rural District: Dalpari

Population (2016)
  - Total: 983
- Time zone: UTC+3:30 (IRST)

Jalizi-ye Bala (Persian: جليزي بالا) (Note: Also romanized as Jalīzī-ye Bālā; also known as Jalīzī) is a village in, and the capital of, Dalpari Rural District of Musiyan District, Dehloran County, Ilam province, Iran.

== Demographics ==
=== Ethnicity ===
The village is populated by Arabs.

=== Population ===
At the time of the 2006 National Census, the village's population was 860 in 131 households, when it was in Nahranbar Rural District. The following census in 2011 counted 981 people in 198 households. The 2016 census measured the population of the village as 983 people in 193 households.

In 2017, Jalizi-ye Bala was transferred to Dalpari Rural District created in the district.
