= Nahranbar =

Village in Ilam province, Iran

Nahranbar Persian: نهرعنبر
- Village
- Location within Iran Location within Ilam Province
- Coordinates: 32°29′49″N 47°30′26″E
- Country: Iran
- Province: Ilam
- County: Dehloran
- District: Musiyan
- Rural District: Nahranbar

Population (2016)
  - Total: 1,051
- Time zone: UTC+3:30 (IRST)

Nahranbar (Persian: نهرعنبر) (Note: Also romanized as Nahr ‘Anbār, Nahr-e Anbar, and Nahr-e ‘Anbar) is a village in Nahranbar Rural District of Musiyan District, Dehloran County, Ilam province, Iran.

== Demographics ==
=== Language ===
The village is populated by Arabs.

=== Population ===
At the time of the 2006 National Census, the village's population was 776 in 110 households. The following census in 2011 counted 1,003 people in 187 households. The 2016 census measured the population of the village as 1,051 people in 243 households. It was the most populous village in its rural district.
