= Dasht-e Abbas =

Village in Ilam province, Iran

Dasht-e Abbas Persian: دشت عباس
- Village
- Location within Iran Location within Ilam Province
- Coordinates: 32°24′58″N 47°49′24″E
- Country: Iran
- Province: Ilam
- County: Dehloran
- District: Dasht-e Abbas
- Rural District: Dasht-e Abbas

Population (2016)
  - Total: 295
- Time zone: UTC+3:30 (IRST)

Dasht-e Abbas (Persian: دشت عباس) (Note: Also romanized as Dasht Abbās and Dasht-e ‘Abbās) is a village in Dasht-e Abbas Rural District of Dasht-e Abbas District, Dehloran County, Ilam province, Iran, serving as capital of both the district and the rural district.

== Demographics ==
=== Population ===
At the time of the 2006 National Census, the village's population was 144 in 27 households, when it was in Musiyan District. The following census in 2011 counted 394 people in 47 households. The 2016 census measured the population of the village as 295 people in 74 households.

In 2017, the rural district was separated from the district in the formation of Dasht-e Abbas District.
