= Jalizi-ye Pain =

Jalizi-ye Pain جليزي پائين
- Village
- Location within Iran
- Coordinates: 32°24′16″N 47°33′47″E
- Country: Iran
- Province: Ilam
- County: Dehloran
- Bakhsh: Musian
- Rural District: Nahr-e Anbar

Population (2006)
  - Total: 198
- Time zone: UTC+3:30 (IRST)
  - Summer (DST): UTC+4:30 (IRDT)

Jalizi-ye Pain (Persian: جليزي پائين, also Romanized as Jalīzī-ye Pā'īn; also known as ‘Alī Na‘īr (Persian: علي نعير) and Jalīzī-ye ‘Alī Naşīr) is a village in Nahr-e Anbar Rural District, Musian District, Dehloran County, Ilam Province, Iran. At the 2006 census, its population was 198, in 32 families. The village is populated by Arabs.
