= Anqolab-e Do =

Anqolab-e Do انقلاب 2
- Village
- Interactive map of Anqolab-e Do
- Coordinates: 32.737°N 47.180°E
- Country: Iran
- Province: Ilam
- County: Dehloran
- Bakhsh: Central
- Rural District: Anaran

Population (2006)
  - Total: 896
- Time zone: UTC+3:30 (IRST)
  - Summer (DST): UTC+4:30 (IRDT)

Anqolab-e Do (Persian: انقلاب 2, also Romanized as Ānqolāb-e Do) is a village in Anaran Rural District, in the Central District of Dehloran County, Ilam Province, Iran. At the 2006 census, its population was 896, in 190 families.
