= Bareh Bijeh =

Village in Ilam province, Iran

Bareh Bijeh Persian: بره بيجه
- Village
- Location within Iran Location within Ilam Province
- Coordinates: 32°30′14″N 47°29′28″E
- Country: Iran
- Province: Ilam
- County: Dehloran
- District: Musiyan
- Rural District: Nahranbar

Population (2016)
  - Total: 272
- Time zone: UTC+3:30 (IRST)

Bareh Bijeh (Persian: بره بيجه) (Note: Also romanized as Bareh Bījeh) is a village in, and the capital of, Nahranbar Rural District of Musiyan District, Dehloran County, Ilam province, Iran.

== Demographics ==
=== Language ===
The village is populated by Arabs.

=== Population ===
At the time of the 2006 National Census, the village's population was 248 in 43 households. The following census in 2011 counted 279 people in 54 households. The 2016 census measured the population of the village as 272 people in 65 households.
