= Jalizi =

Jalizi (Persian: جليزي) may refer to:

- Jalizi-ye Bala, Ilam Province
- Jalizi-ye Pain, Ilam Province
- Jalizi-ye Abdolreza, Khuzestan Province
- Jalizi-ye Hanzaleh, Khuzestan Province
