= Potoka =

Potoka may refer to:

- Potoka, Bulgaria
- Potoka, Poland
- Former Hungarian language name of the Slovak village Potoky
- Kříž u potoka
- Mikroregion Povodí Mratínského potoka

== See also ==
- Potok (disambiguation)
- Patak (disambiguation)
