= Marzabad, Ilam =

Marzabad مرزاباد
- Village
- Location within Iran
- Coordinates: 32°34′00″N 47°22′00″E
- Country: Iran
- Province: Ilam
- County: Dehloran
- Bakhsh: Musian
- Rural District: Nahr-e Anbar

Population (2006)
  - Total: 161
- Time zone: UTC+3:30 (IRST)
  - Summer (DST): UTC+4:30 (IRDT)

Marzabad (Persian: مرزاباد, also Romanized as Marzābād) is a village in Nahr-e Anbar Rural District, Musian District, Dehloran County, Ilam Province, Iran. At the 2006 census, its population was 161, in 28 families. The village is populated by Arabs.
