= Bahar Ab, Ilam =

Bahar Ab بهاراب
- village
- Location within Iran
- Coordinates: 32°56′00″N 46°59′00″E
- Country: Iran
- Province: Ilam
- County: Dehloran
- Bakhsh: Zarrinabad
- Rural District: Seyyed Ebrahim

Population (2007)
  - Total: 19
- Time zone: UTC+3:30 (IRST)
  - Summer (DST): UTC+4:30 (IRDT)

Bahar Ab (Persian: بهاراب, also Romanized as Bahār Āb) is a village in Seyyed Ebrahim Rural District, Zarrinabad District, Dehloran County, Ilam Province, Iran. At the 2007 census, its population was 19, in 4 families. The village is populated by Kurds.
