= Shahrak-e Esteqlal =

Shahrak-e Esteqlal (Persian: شهرک استقلال) may refer to:

- Shahrak-e Esteqlal, Fars
- Shahrak-e Esteqlal, Ilam
