= Qilpenlui =

Qilpenlui (Persian: قلپنلوي), also rendered as Qilpenlu or Qil Penlu or Qil Benlu may refer to:

- Qilpenlui-ye Olya
- Qilpenlui-ye Sofla
