= Shahrak-e Vahdat, Ilam =

Village in Ilam province, Iran

Shahrak-e Vahdat Persian: شهرك وحدت
- Village
- Location within Iran Location within Ilam Province
- Coordinates: 32°44′44″N 47°07′46″E
- Country: Iran
- Province: Ilam
- County: Dehloran
- District: Central
- Rural District: Anaran

Population (2016)
  - Total: 937
- Time zone: UTC+3:30 (IRST)

Shahrak-e Vahdat (Persian: شهرك وحدت) (Note: Also romanized as Shahrak-e Vaḩdat; also known as Shahrak-e Vaḩdat-e Bīsheh Derāz) is a village in Anaran Rural District of the Central District of Dehloran County, Ilam province, Iran.

== Demographics ==
=== Language ===
The village is populated by Lurs.

=== Population ===
At the time of the 2006 National Census, the village's population was 716 in 148 households. The following census in 2011 counted 1,041 people in 269 households. The 2016 census measured the population of the village as 937 people in 279 households. It was the most populous village in its rural district.
