= Qaderlu =

Qaderlu (Persian: قادرلو) may refer to:

- Qaderlu, Ardabil
- Qaderlu, Zanjan
