= Chenaq Bolagh, Ardabil =

Village in Ardabil province, Iran

Chenaq Bolagh Persian: چناق بلاغ
- Village
- Location within Iran
- Coordinates: 38°27′13″N 47°55′48″E
- Country: Iran
- Province: Ardabil
- County: Meshgin Shahr
- District: Meshgin-e Sharqi
- Rural District: Naqdi

Population (2016)
  - Total: 27
- Time zone: UTC+3:30 (IRST)

Chenaq Bolagh (Persian: چناق بلاغ) (Note: Also romanized as Chenāq Bolāgh; also known as Jenāq Bolāgh) is a village in Naqdi Rural District of Meshgin-e Sharqi District in Meshgin Shahr County, Ardabil province, Iran.

== Demographics ==
=== Population ===
At the time of the 2006 National Census, the village's population was 54 in 11 households. The following census in 2011 counted 29 people in nine households. The 2016 census measured the population of the village as 27 people in 10 households.
