= Mesdaraq =

Village in Ardabil province, Iran

Mesdaraq Persian: مسدرق
- Village
- Location within Iran
- Coordinates: 38°25′44″N 47°56′15″E
- Country: Iran
- Province: Ardabil
- County: Meshgin Shahr
- District: Meshgin-e Sharqi
- Rural District: Naqdi

Population (2016)
  - Total: 29
- Time zone: UTC+3:30 (IRST)

Mesdaraq (Persian: مسدرق) is a village in Naqdi Rural District of Meshgin-e Sharqi District in Meshgin Shahr County, Ardabil province, Iran.

== Demographics ==
=== Population ===
At the time of the 2006 National Census, the village's population was 88 in 15 households. The following census in 2011 counted 41 people in 11 households. The 2016 census measured the population of the village as 29 people in nine households.
