= Potaki =

Potaki (Persian: پتكي) may refer to:

- Potaki, Kerman
- Potaki, Khuzestan
