= Astragalus zarreanus =

Scientific classification
- Kingdom: Plantae
- Clade: Tracheophytes
- Clade: Angiosperms
- Clade: Eudicots
- Clade: Rosids
- Order: Fabales
- Family: Fabaceae
- Subfamily: Faboideae
- Genus: Astragalus
- Species: A. zarreanus

Binomial name
- Astragalus zarreanus Ranjbar

Species of flowering plant

Astragalus zarreanus is a species of flowering plant in the family Fabaceae. It is a perennial native to Iran, and was described in 2003.

== Taxonomy ==
The species was described by Massoud Ranjbar in 2003. The type specimen was collected in a mountainous area north of Dehloran.

== Distribution ==
Astragalus zarreanus is native to the temperate biome of western Iran. It is restricted to Ilam Province.

== Description ==
Astragalus zarreanus is a perennial. It grows 40–45 centimetres (16–18 in) high.

The fruit is an elliptical pod.

== Etymology ==
Astragalus zarreanus is named after Shahin Zarre.
