= Dadeh Beyglu =

Village in Ardabil province, Iran

Dadeh Beyglu Persian: دده بيگلو
- Village
- Location within Iran
- Coordinates: 38°33′21″N 47°50′13″E
- Country: Iran
- Province: Ardabil
- County: Meshgin Shahr
- District: Meshgin-e Sharqi
- Rural District: Qarah Su

Population (2016)
  - Total: 662
- Time zone: UTC+3:30 (IRST)

Dadeh Beyglu (Persian: دده بيگلو) (Note: Also romanized as Dadeh Beyglū) is a village in Qarah Su Rural District of Meshgin-e Sharqi District in Meshgin Shahr County, Ardabil province, Iran.

== Demographics ==
=== Population ===
At the time of the 2006 National Census, the village's population was 873 in 229 households. The following census in 2011 counted 829 people in 256 households. The 2016 census measured the population of the village as 662 people in 236 households. It was the most populous village in its rural district.
