= Lehaq =

Village in Ardabil province, Iran

Lehaq Persian: لحاق
- Village
- Location within Iran
- Coordinates: 38°32′10″N 47°52′45″E
- Country: Iran
- Province: Ardabil
- County: Meshgin Shahr
- District: Meshgin-e Sharqi
- Rural District: Qarah Su

Population (2016)
  - Total: 283
- Time zone: UTC+3:30 (IRST)

Lehaq (Persian: لحاق) (Note: Also romanized as Leḩāq) is a village in Qarah Su Rural District of Meshgin-e Sharqi District in Meshgin Shahr County, Ardabil province, Iran.

== Demographics ==
=== Population ===
At the time of the 2006 National Census, the village's population was 405 in 117 households. The following census in 2011 counted 353 people in 107 households. The 2016 census measured the population of the village as 283 people in 105 households.
