= Borom =

Borom may refer to:

- Red Borom (1915-2011), American baseball player
- Borom-e Pain, a village in Ilam Province, Iran
