= Jalayer, Ardabil =

Village in Ardabil province, Iran

Jalayer Persian: جلاير
- Village
- Location within Iran
- Country: Iran
- Province: Ardabil
- County: Meshgin Shahr
- District: Meshgin-e Sharqi
- Rural District: Lahrud

Population (2016)
  - Total: 528
- Time zone: UTC+3:30 (IRST)

Jalayer (Persian: جلاير) (Note: Also romanized as Jalāyer) is a village in Lahrud Rural District of Meshgin-e Sharqi District in Meshgin Shahr County, Ardabil province, Iran.

== Demographics ==
=== Population ===
At the time of the 2006 National Census, the village's population was 714 in 165 households. The following census in 2011 counted 575 people in 165 households. The 2016 census measured the population of the village as 528 people in 166 households.
