= Zafarani =

Zafarani or Zaafarani may refer to:

- Zafarani, Iran, a village in Ilam Province, Iran
- Jafar Zafarani, Iranian mathematician
- Sara Zaafarani, Tunisian engineer and politician
