= Shater Gonbadi =

Village in Ardabil province, Iran

Shater Gonbadi Persian: شاطرگنبدي
- Village
- Location within Iran
- Coordinates: 38°23′27″N 47°53′35″E
- Country: Iran
- Province: Ardabil
- County: Meshgin Shahr
- District: Meshgin-e Sharqi
- Rural District: Lahrud

Population (2016)
  - Total: Below reporting threshold
- Time zone: UTC+3:30 (IRST)

Shater Gonbadi (Persian: شاطرگنبدي) (Note: Also romanized as Shāţer Gonbadī) is a village in Lahrud Rural District of Meshgin-e Sharqi District in Meshgin Shahr County, Ardabil province, Iran.

== Demographics ==
=== Population ===
At the time of the 2006 National Census, the village's population was 19 in four households. The village did not appear in the following census of 2011. The 2016 census measured the population of the village as below the reporting threshold.
