= Pirazmeyan =

Village in Ardabil province, Iran

Pirazmeyan Persian: پيرازميان
- Village
- Location within Iran
- Coordinates: 38°32′27″N 47°55′47″E
- Country: Iran
- Province: Ardabil
- County: Meshgin Shahr
- District: Meshgin-e Sharqi
- Rural District: Naqdi

Population (2016)
  - Total: 178
- Time zone: UTC+3:30 (IRST)

Pirazmeyan (Persian: پيرازميان) (Note: Also romanized as Pīrāzmeyān and Pīrāzmīān; also known as Birāzmand and Parāzmeyān) is a village in Naqdi Rural District of Meshgin-e Sharqi District in Meshgin Shahr County, Ardabil province, Iran.

== Demographics ==
=== Population ===
At the time of the 2006 National Census, the village's population was 393 in 93 households. The following census in 2011 counted 215 people in 65 households. The 2016 census measured the population of the village as 178 people in 69 households.
