= Kangarlu, Ardabil =

Village in Ardabil province, Iran

Kangarlu Persian: كنگرلو
- Village
- Location within Iran
- Coordinates: 38°34′57″N 47°47′54″E
- Country: Iran
- Province: Ardabil
- County: Meshgin Shahr
- District: Meshgin-e Sharqi
- Rural District: Lahrud

Population (2016)
  - Total: 392
- Time zone: UTC+3:30 (IRST)

Kangarlu (Persian: كنگرلو) (Note: Also romanized as Kangarlū) is a village in Lahrud Rural District of Meshgin-e Sharqi District in Meshgin Shahr County, Ardabil province, Iran.

== Demographics ==
=== Population ===
At the time of the 2006 National Census, the village's population was 580 in 146 households. The following census in 2011 counted 403 people in 125 households. The 2016 census measured the population of the village as 392 people in 138 households.
