= Naghdi =

Naghdi may refer to:

- Naghdi, Iran (disambiguation), places in Iran
- Mohammadreza Naghdi, Iranian paramilitary commander
- Paul M. Naghdi, Iranian-American scientist
- Yasmine Naghdi, British ballet dancer
