= Dash Bolaghi =

Village in Ardabil province, Iran

Dash Bolaghi Persian: داش بلاغي
- Village
- Location within Iran
- Coordinates: 38°26′33″N 47°57′37″E
- Country: Iran
- Province: Ardabil
- County: Meshgin Shahr
- District: Meshgin-e Sharqi
- Rural District: Naqdi

Population (2016)
  - Total: 24
- Time zone: UTC+3:30 (IRST)

Dash Bolaghi (Persian: داش بلاغي) (Note: Also romanized as Dāsh Bolāghī; also known as Dāsh Bolāgh and Dāshbolāgh) is a village in Naqdi Rural District of Meshgin-e Sharqi District in Meshgin Shahr County, Ardabil province, Iran.

== Demographics ==
=== Population ===
At the time of the 2006 National Census, the village's population was 27 in seven households. The following census in 2011 counted 14 people in four households. The 2016 census measured the population of the village as 24 people in eight households.
