= Pataki =

Pataki may refer to:

- Pataki (surname)
- Hungarian name of Potoky, Slovakia
- Hayden v. Pataki
- Pataki (film), a 2017 Indian Kannada-language film
- Paatki, a 2026 Indian Gujarati-language film

== See also ==
- Patakí stories
- Potaki (disambiguation)
- Potok (disambiguation)
- Potocki family, an artistocratic family originating from Potok in the Kraków Voivodeship
