= Chapaqan =

Village in Ardabil province, Iran

Chapaqan Persian: چپقان
- Village
- Location within Iran
- Coordinates: 38°34′04″N 47°51′47″E
- Country: Iran
- Province: Ardabil
- County: Meshgin Shahr
- District: Meshgin-e Sharqi
- Rural District: Qarah Su

Population (2016)
  - Total: 334
- Time zone: UTC+3:30 (IRST)

Chapaqan (Persian: چپقان) (Note: Also romanized as Chapaqān; also known as Chayaqān) is a village in Qarah Su Rural District of Meshgin-e Sharqi District in Meshgin Shahr County, Ardabil province, Iran.

== Demographics ==
=== Population ===
At the time of the 2006 National Census, the village's population was 447 in 99 households. The following census in 2011 counted 440 people in 138 households. The 2016 census measured the population of the village as 334 people in 122 households.
