= Sheykhlu, Ardabil =

Village in Ardabil province, Iran

Sheykhlu Persian: شيخ لو
- Village
- Location within Iran
- Coordinates: 38°34′15″N 47°51′36″E
- Country: Iran
- Province: Ardabil
- County: Meshgin Shahr
- District: Meshgin-e Sharqi
- Rural District: Qarah Su

Population (2016)
  - Total: 117
- Time zone: UTC+3:30 (IRST)

Sheykhlu (Persian: شيخ لو) (Note: Also romanized as Sheykhlū; also known as Sheykh Moḩammadlū, Sheykhlar, Sheyklū, and Shikhli) is a village in Qarah Su Rural District of Meshgin-e Sharqi District in Meshgin Shahr County, Ardabil province, Iran.

== Demographics ==
=== Population ===
At the time of the 2006 National Census, the village's population was 162 in 38 households. The following census in 2011 counted 135 people in 46 households. The 2016 census measured the population of the village as 117 people in 48 households.
