= Shush Bolagh =

Village in Ardabil province, Iran

Shush Bolagh Persian: شوش بلاغ
- Village
- Location within Iran
- Coordinates: 38°26′10″N 47°57′00″E
- Country: Iran
- Province: Ardabil
- County: Meshgin Shahr
- District: Meshgin-e Sharqi
- Rural District: Naqdi

Population (2016)
  - Total: 81
- Time zone: UTC+3:30 (IRST)

Shush Bolagh (Persian: شوش بلاغ) (Note: Also romanized as Shūsh Bolāgh) is a village in Naqdi Rural District of Meshgin-e Sharqi District in Meshgin Shahr County, Ardabil province, Iran.

== Demographics ==
=== Population ===
At the time of the 2006 National Census, the village's population was 124 in 23 households. The following census in 2011 counted 64 people in 17 households. The 2016 census measured the population of the village as 81 people in 27 households.
