= Mir Alilu =

Village in Ardabil province, Iran

Mir Alilu Persian: ميرعليلو
- Village
- Location within Iran
- Coordinates: 38°31′23″N 47°52′47″E
- Country: Iran
- Province: Ardabil
- County: Meshgin Shahr
- District: Meshgin-e Sharqi
- Rural District: Qarah Su

Population (2016)
  - Total: 186
- Time zone: UTC+3:30 (IRST)

Mir Alilu (Persian: ميرعليلو) (Note: Also romanized as Mīr ‘Alīlū) is a village in Qarah Su Rural District of Meshgin-e Sharqi District in Meshgin Shahr County, Ardabil province, Iran.

== Demographics ==
=== Population ===
At the time of the 2006 National Census, the village's population was 170 in 65 households. The following census in 2011 counted 125 people in 57 households. The 2016 census measured the population of the village as 186 people in 88 households.
