= Lomir =

Lomir may refer to:

- Isradipine, a pharmaceutical of the calcium channel blocker class
- Lombar, a village in Iran
