= Beneh Lar =

Village in Ardabil province, Iran

Beneh Lar Persian: بنه لر
- Village
- Location within Iran
- Coordinates: 38°27′17″N 47°52′05″E
- Country: Iran
- Province: Ardabil
- County: Meshgin Shahr
- District: Meshgin-e Sharqi
- Rural District: Lahrud

Population (2016)
  - Total: 17
- Time zone: UTC+3:30 (IRST)

Beneh Lar (Persian: بنه لر) (Note: Also known as Bandelar) is a village in Lahrud Rural District of Meshgin-e Sharqi District in Meshgin Shahr County, Ardabil province, Iran.

== Demographics ==
=== Population ===
At the time of the 2006 National Census, the village's population was 17 in five households. The village did not appear in the following census of 2011. The 2016 census measured the population of the village as 17 people in five households.
