= Arbab Kandi =

Village in Ardabil province, Iran

Arbab Kandi Persian: ارباب كندي
- Village
- Location within Iran
- Coordinates: 38°29′47″N 48°01′36″E
- Country: Iran
- Province: Ardabil
- County: Meshgin Shahr
- District: Meshgin-e Sharqi
- Rural District: Naqdi

Population (2016)
  - Total: 595
- Time zone: UTC+3:30 (IRST)

Arbab Kandi (Persian: ارباب كندي) (Note: Also romanized as Arbāb Kandī; also known as Arbāb, Arva, Arveh, Avra, and Evreh) is a village in Naqdi Rural District of Meshgin-e Sharqi District in Meshgin Shahr County, Ardabil province, Iran.

== Demographics ==
=== Population ===
At the time of the 2006 National Census, the village's population was 903 in 209 households. The following census in 2011 counted 875 people in 243 households. The 2016 census measured the population of the village as 595 people in 200 households.
