= Shahab ol Din, Ardabil =

Village in Ardabil province, Iran

Shahab ol Din Persian: شهاب الدين
- Village
- Location within Iran
- Coordinates: 38°29′38″N 47°55′55″E
- Country: Iran
- Province: Ardabil
- County: Meshgin Shahr
- District: Meshgin-e Sharqi
- Rural District: Naqdi

Population (2016)
  - Total: 14
- Time zone: UTC+3:30 (IRST)

Shahab ol Din (Persian: شهاب الدين) (Note: Also romanized as Shahāb ol Dīn; also known as Shahāb od Dīn) is a village in Naqdi Rural District of Meshgin-e Sharqi District in Meshgin Shahr County, Ardabil province, Iran.

== Demographics ==
=== Population ===
At the time of the 2006 National Census, the village's population was 36 in 11 households. The following census in 2011 counted 23 people in seven households. The 2016 census measured the population of the village as 14 people in seven households.
