= Qarah Qayah, Ardabil =

Village in Ardabil province, Iran

Qarah Qayah Persian: قره قيه
- Village
- Location within Iran
- Coordinates: 38°33′11″N 47°45′29″E
- Country: Iran
- Province: Ardabil
- County: Meshgin Shahr
- District: Meshgin-e Sharqi
- Rural District: Lahrud

Population (2016)
  - Total: 1,286
- Time zone: UTC+3:30 (IRST)

Qarah Qayah (Persian: قره قيه) (Note: Also romanized as Qareh Qayeh) is a village in Lahrud Rural District of Meshgin-e Sharqi District in Meshgin Shahr County, Ardabil province, Iran.

== Demographics ==
=== Population ===
At the time of the 2006 National Census, the village's population was 1,713 in 410 households. The following census in 2011 counted 1,335 people in 395 households. The 2016 census measured the population of the village as 1,286 people in 415 households.
