= Dash Kasan, Ardabil =

Village in Ardabil province, Iran

Dash Kasan Persian: داش كسن
- Village
- Location within Iran
- Coordinates: 38°25′36″N 47°52′38″E
- Country: Iran
- Province: Ardabil
- County: Meshgin Shahr
- District: Meshgin-e Sharqi
- Rural District: Lahrud

Population (2016)
  - Total: 220
- Time zone: UTC+3:30 (IRST)

Dash Kasan (Persian: داش كسن) (Note: Also romanized as Dāsh Kasan; also known as Dāsh Kashan) is a village in Lahrud Rural District of Meshgin-e Sharqi District in Meshgin Shahr County, Ardabil province, Iran.

== Demographics ==
=== Population ===
At the time of the 2006 National Census, the village's population was 324 in 71 households. The following census in 2011 counted 194 people in 66 households. The 2016 census measured the population of the village as 220 people in 65 households.
