= Babian =

Village in Ardabil province, Iran

Babian Persian: بابيان
- Village
- Location within Iran
- Coordinates: 38°26′01″N 47°54′16″E
- Country: Iran
- Province: Ardabil
- County: Meshgin Shahr
- District: Meshgin-e Sharqi
- Rural District: Lahrud

Population (2016)
  - Total: 20
- Time zone: UTC+3:30 (IRST)

Babian (Persian: بابيان) (Note: Also romanized as Bābīān) is a village in Lahrud Rural District of Meshgin-e Sharqi District in Meshgin Shahr County, Ardabil province, Iran.

== Demographics ==
=== Population ===
At the time of the 2006 National Census, the village's population was 43 in nine households. The village did not appear in the following census of 2011. The 2016 census measured the population of the village as 20 people in four households.
