= Sharafeh =

Sharafeh or Sharfeh (Persian: شرفه) may refer to:

- Sharafeh, Ardabil
- Sharafeh, East Azerbaijan
- Sharfeh, East Azerbaijan
- Sharafeh, Ilam
