= Lanjabad, Ardabil =

Village in Ardabil province, Iran

Lanjabad Persian: لنج اباد
- Village
- Location within Iran
- Coordinates: 38°24′19″N 47°55′48″E
- Country: Iran
- Province: Ardabil
- County: Meshgin Shahr
- District: Meshgin-e Sharqi
- Rural District: Lahrud

Population (2016)
  - Total: 97
- Time zone: UTC+3:30 (IRST)

Lanjabad (Persian: لنج اباد) (Note: Also romanized as Lanjābād) is a village in Lahrud Rural District of Meshgin-e Sharqi District in Meshgin Shahr County, Ardabil province, Iran.

== Demographics ==
=== Population ===
At the time of the 2006 National Census, the village's population was 98 in 26 households. The following census in 2011 counted 38 people in 10 households. The 2016 census measured the population of the village as 97 people in 29 households.
