= Aliabad, Qarah Su =

Village in Ardabil province, Iran

Aliabad Persian: علی‌آباد
- Village
- Location within Iran
- Coordinates: 38°29′42″N 47°52′42″E
- Country: Iran
- Province: Ardabil
- County: Meshgin Shahr
- District: Meshgin-e Sharqi
- Rural District: Qarah Su

Population (2016)
  - Total: 236
- Time zone: UTC+3:30 (IRST)

Aliabad (Persian: علی‌آباد) (Note: Also romanized as ‘Alīābād) is a village in Qarah Su Rural District of Meshgin-e Sharqi District in Meshgin Shahr County, Ardabil province, Iran.

== Demographics ==
=== Population ===
At the time of the 2006 National Census, the village's population was 296 in 75 households. The following census in 2011 counted 287 people in 80 households. The 2016 census measured the population of the village as 236 people in 83 households.
