= Aghcheh Qeshlaq, Ardabil =

Village in Ardabil province, Iran

Aghcheh Qeshlaq Persian: اغچه قشلاق
- Village
- Location within Iran
- Coordinates: 38°27′41″N 47°58′26″E
- Country: Iran
- Province: Ardabil
- County: Meshgin Shahr
- District: Meshgin-e Sharqi
- Rural District: Naqdi

Population (2016)
  - Total: 80
- Time zone: UTC+3:30 (IRST)

Aghcheh Qeshlaq (Persian: اغچه قشلاق) (Note: Also romanized as Āghcheh Qeshlāq; also known as Āghcheh Qeshlāqī and Āqcheh Qeshlāq) is a village in Naqdi Rural District of Meshgin-e Sharqi District in Meshgin Shahr County, Ardabil province, Iran.

== Demographics ==
=== Population ===
At the time of the 2006 National Census, the village's population was 70 in 14 households. The following census in 2011 counted 52 people in 14 households. The 2016 census measured the population of the village as 80 people in 27 households.
