= Kheybar =

Kheybar (Persian: خيبر) may refer to:

- F.C. Kheybar Khorramabad, An Iranian football club
- Kheybar, Ilam
- Kheybar, Kermanshah
- Kheybar Rural District, in Khuzestan Province
