= Balata =

Balata may refer to:

== West Bank ==
- Balata village or Balata al-Balad, a suburb of Nablus, West Bank
- Balata Camp, a Palestinian refugee camp in the West Bank
- Tell Balata, an archaeological site on the West Bank

== Other locations ==
- Balata, French Guiana, a village in French Guiana
- Balata, Iran, a village in Ilam Province, Iran
- Bălata, a village in Șoimuș Commune, Hunedoara County, Romania
- Balata Garden, on Martinique

== Plants ==
- Mimusops balata, a flowering plant native to Mauritius and Réunion
- Manilkara bidentata, known as balatá, a latex-producing tree native to the Americas
