= Lal Ganj =

Village in Ardabil province, Iran

Lal Ganj Persian: لعل گنج
- Village
- Location within Iran
- Coordinates: 38°32′14″N 47°44′50″E
- Country: Iran
- Province: Ardabil
- County: Meshgin Shahr
- District: Meshgin-e Sharqi
- Rural District: Lahrud

Population (2016)
  - Total: 98
- Time zone: UTC+3:30 (IRST)

Lal Ganj (Persian: لعل گنج) (Note: Also romanized as La‘l Ganj) is a village in Lahrud Rural District of Meshgin-e Sharqi District in Meshgin Shahr County, Ardabil province, Iran.

== Demographics ==
=== Population ===
At the time of the 2006 National Census, the village's population was 164 in 35 households. The following census in 2011 counted 138 people in 35 households. The 2016 census measured the population of the village as 98 people in 30 households.
