= Gol Cheshmeh, Ardabil =

Village in Ardabil province, Iran

Gol Cheshmeh Persian: گل چشمه
- Village
- Country: Iran
- Province: Ardabil
- County: Meshgin Shahr
- District: Meshgin-e Sharqi
- Rural District: Lahrud

Population (2016)
  - Total: 146
- Time zone: UTC+3:30 (IRST)

Gol Cheshmeh (Persian: گل چشمه) is a village in Lahrud Rural District of Meshgin-e Sharqi District in Meshgin Shahr County, Ardabil province, Iran.

== Demographics ==
=== Population ===
At the time of the 2006 National Census, the village's population was 134 in 29 households. The following census in 2011 counted 118 people in 39 households. The 2016 census measured the population of the village as 146 people in 52 households.
