= Kavich =

Village in Ardabil province, Iran

Kavich Persian: كويچ
- Village
- Location within Iran
- Coordinates: 38°29′40″N 47°53′14″E
- Country: Iran
- Province: Ardabil
- County: Meshgin Shahr
- District: Meshgin-e Sharqi
- Rural District: Qarah Su

Population (2016)
  - Total: 425
- Time zone: UTC+3:30 (IRST)

Kavich (Persian: كويچ) (Note: Also romanized as Kavīch) is a village in Qarah Su Rural District of Meshgin-e Sharqi District in Meshgin Shahr County, Ardabil province, Iran.

== Demographics ==
=== Population ===
At the time of the 2006 National Census, the village's population was 569 in 151 households. The following census in 2011 counted 591 people in 183 households. The 2016 census measured the population of the village as 425 people in 158 households.
