= Pahleh =

City in Ilam province, Iran

Pahleh Persian: پهله
- City
- Location within Iran Location within Ilam Province
- Coordinates: 33°00′33″N 46°52′59″E
- Country: Iran
- Province: Ilam
- County: Dehloran
- District: Zarrinabad

Population (2016)
  - Total: 3,870
- Time zone: UTC+3:30 (IRST)

Pahleh (Persian: پهله) is a city in, and the capital of, Zarrinabad District of Dehloran County, Ilam province, Iran. It also serves as the administrative center for Seyd Nasraldin Rural District.

== Demographics ==
=== Ethnicity ===
The city is populated by Kurds.

=== Population ===
At the time of the 2006 National Census, the city's population was 4,341 in 840 households. The following census in 2011 counted 4,065 people in 954 households. The 2016 census measured the population of the city as 3,870 people in 1,015 households.
