= Jamush Olan-e Olya =

Village in Ardabil province, Iran

Jamush Olan-e Olya Persian: جاموش اولن عليا
- Village
- Location within Iran
- Coordinates: 38°26′37″N 47°59′22″E
- Country: Iran
- Province: Ardabil
- County: Meshgin Shahr
- District: Meshgin-e Sharqi
- Rural District: Naqdi

Population (2016)
  - Total: 17
- Time zone: UTC+3:30 (IRST)

Jamush Olan-e Olya (Persian: جاموش اولن عليا) (Note: Also romanized as Jāmūsh Olan-e ‘Olyā; also known as Gāvmīsh Owlan-e ‘Olyā) is a village in Naqdi Rural District of Meshgin-e Sharqi District in Meshgin Shahr County, Ardabil province, Iran.

== Demographics ==
=== Population ===
At the time of the 2006 National Census, the village's population was 28 in four households. The village did not appear in following census of 2011. The 2016 census measured the population of the village as 17 people in five households.
