= Lombar =

Village in Ardabil province, Iran

Lombar Persian: لمبر
- Village
- Location within Iran
- Coordinates: 38°33′03″N 47°53′32″E
- Country: Iran
- Province: Ardabil
- County: Meshgin Shahr
- District: Meshgin-e Sharqi
- Rural District: Qarah Su

Population (2016)
  - Total: 501
- Time zone: UTC+3:30 (IRST)

Lombar (Persian: لمبر) (Note: Also known as Lemīr) is a village in Qarah Su Rural District of Meshgin-e Sharqi District in Meshgin Shahr County, Ardabil province, Iran.

== Demographics ==
=== Population ===
At the time of the 2006 National Census, the village's population was 562 in 161 households. The following census in 2011 counted 554 people in 182 households. The 2016 census measured the population of the village as 501 people in 178 households.
