= Musiyan, Ilam =

City in Ilam province, Iran

Musiyan Persian: موسيان
- City
- Location within Iran Location within Ilam Province
- Coordinates: 32°31′14″N 47°22′39″E
- Country: Iran
- Province: Ilam
- County: Dehloran
- District: Musiyan

Population (2016)
  - Total: 2,459
- Time zone: UTC+3:30 (IRST)

Musiyan (Persian: موسيان) (Note: Also romanized as Mūseyān, Musian, Mūsīān, and Mūsīyān; also known as Mīsīan and Tepe Mīslan) is a city in, and the capital of, Musian District of Dehloran County, Ilam province, Iran.

== Demographics ==
=== Language ===
It is a majority Luri-speaking city; about a quarter of the population speaks Arabic.

=== Population ===
At the time of the 2006 National Census, the city's population was 2,571 in 491 households. The following census in 2011 counted 2,577 people in 564 households. The 2016 census measured the population of the city as 2,459 people in 642 households.
