= Naqdi-ye Olya =

Village in Ardabil province, Iran

Naqdi-ye Olya Persian: نقدي عليا
- Village
- Location within Iran
- Coordinates: 38°29′42″N 47°56′49″E
- Country: Iran
- Province: Ardabil
- County: Meshgin Shahr
- District: Meshgin-e Sharqi
- Rural District: Naqdi

Population (2016)
  - Total: 738
- Time zone: UTC+3:30 (IRST)

Naqdi-ye Olya (Persian: نقدي عليا) (Note: Also romanized as Nāqdī-ye ‘Olyā and Noqdī-ye ‘Olyā; also known as Naghdi Olya, Naqdī, Naqdī-ye Bālā, Noqdeh-ye Yūkhārī, Noqdī, Noqdī-ye Bālā, and Nugdi) is a village in, and the capital of, Naqdi Rural District in Meshgin-e Sharqi District of Meshgin Shahr County, Ardabil province, Iran.

== Demographics ==
=== Population ===
At the time of the 2006 National Census, the village's population was 1,561 in 386 households. The following census in 2011 counted 1,178 people in 366 households. The 2016 census measured the population of the village as 738 people in 302 households. It was the most populous village in its rural district.
