= Lahrud Rural District =

Rural district in Ardabil province, Iran

Lahrud Rural District Persian: دهستان لاهرود
- Rural District
- Location within Iran
- Coordinates: 38°26′N 47°49′E
- Country: Iran
- Province: Ardabil
- County: Meshgin Shahr
- District: Meshgin-e Sharqi
- Established: 1987
- Capital: Lahrud

Population (2016)
  - Total: 4,329
- Time zone: UTC+3:30 (IRST)

Lahrud Rural District (Persian: دهستان لاهرود) is in Meshgin-e Sharqi District of Meshgin Shahr County, Ardabil province, Iran. It is administered from the city of Lahrud.

== Demographics ==
=== Population ===
At the time of the 2006 National Census, the rural district's population was 5,630 in 1,373 households. There were 3,928 inhabitants in 1,177 households at the following census of 2011. The 2016 census measured the population of the rural district as 4,329 in 1,430 households. The most populous of its 12 villages was Onar, with 1,488 people.

=== Other villages in the rural district ===
- Alardeh
- Babian
- Beneh Lar
- Dash Kasan
- Gol Cheshmeh
- Jalayer
- Kangarlu
- Lal Ganj
- Lanjabad
- Qarah Qayah
- Shater Gonbadi
