= Qarah Su Rural District (Meshgin Shahr County) =

Rural district in Ardabil province, Iran

Qarah Su Rural District Persian: دهستان قره سو
- Rural District
- Location within Iran
- Coordinates: 38°32′N 47°51′E
- Country: Iran
- Province: Ardabil
- County: Meshgin Shahr
- District: Meshgin-e Sharqi
- Established: 1987
- Capital: Fakhrabad

Population (2016)
  - Total: 3,237
- Time zone: UTC+3:30 (IRST)

Qarah Su Rural District (Persian: دهستان قره سو) is in Meshgin-e Sharqi District of Meshgin Shahr County, Ardabil province, Iran. It is administered from the city of Fakhrabad.

== Demographics ==
=== Population ===
At the time of the 2006 National Census, the rural district's population was 5,454 in 1,466 households. There were 3,956 inhabitants in 1,257 households at the following census of 2011. The 2016 census measured the population of the rural district as 3,237 in 1,192 households. The most populous of its 10 villages was Dadeh Beyglu, with 662 people.

=== Other villages in the rural district ===
- Aliabad
- Arjaq
- Chapaqan
- Kavich
- Lehaq
- Lombar
- Mir Alilu
- Qaderlu
- Sheykhlu
