= Dalpari Rural District =

Rural district in Ilam province, Iran

Dalpari Rural District Persian: دهستان دالپری
- Rural District
- Location within Iran Location within Ilam Province
- Coordinates: 32°34′19″N 47°32′23″E
- Country: Iran
- Province: Ilam
- County: Dehloran
- District: Musiyan
- Capital: Jalizi-ye Bala
- Time zone: UTC+3:30 (IRST)

Dalpari Rural District (Persian: دهستان دالپری) is in Musiyan District of Dehloran County, Ilam province, Iran. Its capital is the village of Jalizi-ye Bala, whose population at the time of the 2016 National Census was 942 people in 216 households.

== History ==
Dalpari Rural District was created in Musiyan District in 2017.
