= Qaderlu, Ardabil =

Village in Ardabil province, Iran

Qaderlu Persian: قادرلو
- Village
- Location within Iran
- Coordinates: 38°34′40″N 47°53′16″E
- Country: Iran
- Province: Ardabil
- County: Meshgin Shahr
- District: Meshgin-e Sharqi
- Rural District: Qarah Su

Population (2016)
  - Total: 81
- Time zone: UTC+3:30 (IRST)

Qaderlu (Persian: قادرلو) (Note: Also romanized as Qāderlū) is a village in Qarah Su Rural District of Meshgin-e Sharqi District in Meshgin Shahr County, Ardabil province, Iran.

== Demographics ==
=== Population ===
At the time of the 2006 National Census, the village's population was 115 in 27 households. The following census in 2011 counted 96 people in 28 households. The 2016 census measured the population of the village as 81 people in 31 households.
