= Qilpenlui-ye Sofla =

Village in Ardabil province, Iran

Qilpenlui-ye Sofla Persian: قلپنلوي سفلي
- Village
- Location within Iran
- Coordinates: 38°27′44″N 47°57′00″E
- Country: Iran
- Province: Ardabil
- County: Meshgin Shahr
- District: Meshgin-e Sharqi
- Rural District: Naqdi

Population (2016)
  - Total: Below reporting threshold
- Time zone: UTC+3:30 (IRST)

Qilpenlui-ye Sofla (Persian: قلپنلوي سفلي) (Note: Also romanized as Qīlpenlūī-ye Soflá; also known as Qīl Benlū-ye Soflá, Qīl Penlū-ye Soflá, and Qīlpenlū-ye Soflá) is a village in Naqdi Rural District of Meshgin-e Sharqi District in Meshgin Shahr County, Ardabil province, Iran.

== Demographics ==
=== Population ===
At the time of the 2006 National Census, the village's population was 24 in seven households. The following census in 2011 counted a population below the reporting threshold. The 2016 census again measured the population as below the reporting threshold.
