= Qilpenlui-ye Olya =

Village in Ardabil province, Iran

Qilpenlui-ye Olya Persian: قلپنلوي عليا
- Village
- Location within Iran
- Coordinates: 38°27′26″N 47°57′31″E
- Country: Iran
- Province: Ardabil
- County: Meshgin Shahr
- District: Meshgin-e Sharqi
- Rural District: Naqdi

Population (2016)
  - Total: 14
- Time zone: UTC+3:30 (IRST)

Qilpenlui-ye Olya (Persian: قلپنلوي عليا) (Note: Also romanized as Qīlpenlūī-ye ‘Olyā; also known as Qīl Penlū-ye ‘Olyā and Qīlpenlū-ye ‘Olyā) is a village in Naqdi Rural District of Meshgin-e Sharqi District in Meshgin Shahr County, Ardabil province, Iran.

== Demographics ==
=== Population ===
At the time of the 2006 National Census, the village's population was 30 in eight households. The following census in 2011 counted 80 people in 21 households. The 2016 census measured the population of the village as 14 people in six households.
