= Jamush Olan-e Sofla =

Village in Ardabil province, Iran

Jamush Olan-e Sofla Persian: جاموش اولن سفلي
- Village
- Location within Iran
- Coordinates: 38°26′57″N 47°59′31″E
- Country: Iran
- Province: Ardabil
- County: Meshgin Shahr
- District: Meshgin-e Sharqi
- Rural District: Naqdi

Population (2016)
  - Total: 29
- Time zone: UTC+3:30 (IRST)

Jamush Olan-e Sofla (Persian: جاموش اولن سفلي) (Note: Also romanized as Jāmūsh Olan-e Soflá; also known as Gāvmīsh Owlan-e Soflá) is a village in Naqdi Rural District of Meshgin-e Sharqi District in Meshgin Shahr County, Ardabil province, Iran.

== Demographics ==
=== Population ===
At the time of the 2006 National Census, the village's population was 67 in 18 households. The following census in 2011 counted 32 people in 10 households. The 2016 census measured the population of the village as 29 people in 11 households.
