= Naqdi-ye Sofla =

Village in Ardabil province, Iran

Naqdi-ye Sofla Persian: نقدي سفلي
- Village
- Location within Iran
- Coordinates: 38°31′57″N 47°56′24″E
- Country: Iran
- Province: Ardabil
- County: Meshgin Shahr
- District: Meshgin-e Sharqi
- Rural District: Naqdi

Population (2016)
  - Total: 96
- Time zone: UTC+3:30 (IRST)

Naqdi-ye Sofla (Persian: نقدي سفلي) (Note: Also romanized as Nāqdī-ye Soflā; also known as Naghdi Sofla, Naqdī-ye Pā’īn, Noqdeh-ye Ashāqī, Noqdī-ye Pā’īn, and Nugdi) is a village in Naqdi Rural District of Meshgin-e Sharqi District in Meshgin Shahr County, Ardabil province, Iran.

== Demographics ==
=== Population ===
At the time of the 2006 National Census, the village's population was 166 in 38 households. The following census in 2011 counted 123 people in 37 households. The 2016 census measured the population of the village as 96 people in 41 households.
