= Lahrud =

City in Ardabil province, Iran

Lahrud Persian: لاهرود
- City
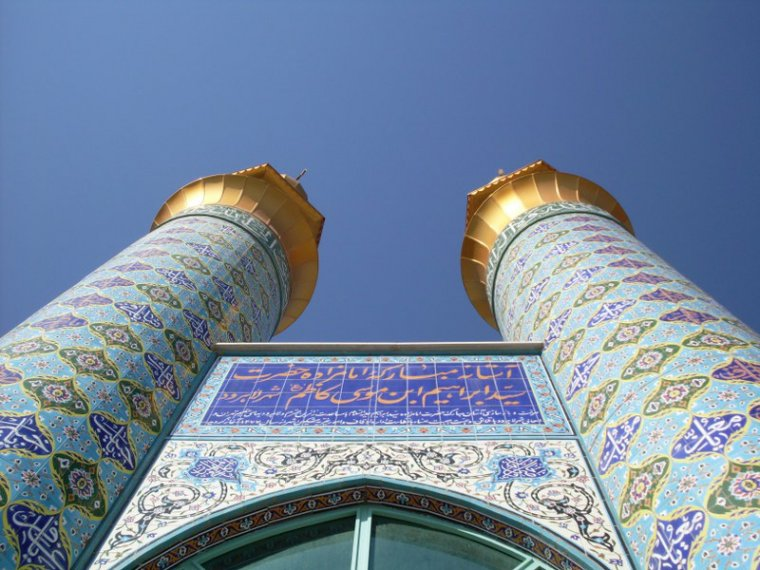
- Seyed Ebrahim Lahrud Mausoleum

- Location within Iran
- Coordinates: 38°30′30″N 47°49′56″E
- Country: Iran
- Province: Ardabil
- County: Meshgin Shahr
- District: Meshgin-e Sharqi
- Established as a city: 1997

Population (2016)
  - Total: 2,149
- Time zone: UTC+3:30 (IRST)

Lahrud (Persian: لاهرود) (Note: Also romanized as Lāhrūd; formerly Lari (لاری), also romanized as Lārī; also formerly Serahi (سِراهی), also romanized as Seh Rāhī and Serāhī) is a city in, and the capital of, Meshgin-e Sharqi District in Meshgin Shahr County, Ardabil province, Iran. It also serves as the administrative center for Lahrud Rural District. The village of Lahrud was converted to a city in 1997.

== Demographics ==
=== Population ===
At the time of the 2006 National Census, the city's population was 2,961 in 782 households. The following census in 2011 counted 2,583 people in 743 households. The 2016 census measured the population of the city as 2,149 people in 762 households.

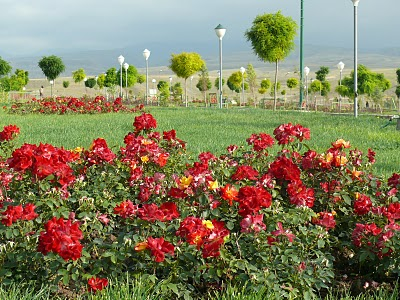
Daghlar Gardens, Bagh-e Lahrud
