= Onar, Ardabil =

Village in Ardabil province, Iran

Onar Persian: اونار
- Village
- Location within Iran
- Coordinates: 38°29′00″N 47°51′48″E
- Country: Iran
- Province: Ardabil
- County: Meshgin Shahr
- District: Meshgin-e Sharqi
- Rural District: Lahrud

Population (2016)
  - Total: 1,488
- Time zone: UTC+3:30 (IRST)

Onar (Persian: اونار) (Note: Also known as Unar) is a village in Lahrud Rural District of Meshgin-e Sharqi District in Meshgin Shahr County, Ardabil province, Iran.

== Demographics ==
=== Population ===
At the time of the 2006 National Census, the village's population was 1,786 in 465 households. The following census in 2011 counted 1,127 people in 342 households. The 2016 census measured the population of the village as 1,488 people in 516 households. It was the most populous village in its rural district.
