= Patak-e Jalali =

Patak-e Jalali پتك جلالي
- Village
- Location within Iran
- Coordinates: 31°15′35″N 49°53′01″E
- Country: Iran
- Province: Khuzestan
- County: Bagh-e Malek
- Bakhsh: Meydavud
- Rural District: Saroleh

Population (2006)
  - Total: 1,975
- Time zone: UTC+3:30 (IRST)
  - Summer (DST): UTC+4:30 (IRDT)

Patak-e Jalali (Persian: پتك جلالي, also Romanized as Patak-e Jalālī; also known as Pelak Jalāli and Penīk) is a village in Saroleh Rural District, Meydavud District, Bagh-e Malek County, Khuzestan Province, Iran. At the 2006 census, its population was 1,975, in 367 families.
