= Fakhrabad-e Olya =

Fakhrabad-e Olya فخرابادعليا
- Village
- Location within Iran
- Coordinates: 33°57′13″N 48°54′56″E
- Country: Iran
- Province: Lorestan
- County: Borujerd
- Bakhsh: Central
- Rural District: Darreh Seydi

Population (2006)
  - Total: 67
- Time zone: UTC+3:30 (IRST)
  - Summer (DST): UTC+4:30 (IRDT)

Fakhrabad-e Olya (Persian: فخرابادعليا, also Romanized as Fakhrābād-e ‘Olyā and Fakhrābād ‘Olyā; also known as Fakhrābād, Fakhrābād-e Bālā, and Sar Darreh) is a village in Darreh Seydi Rural District, in the Central District of Borujerd County, Lorestan Province, Iran. At the 2006 census, its population was 67, in 17 families.
