= Mazrabad =

Mazrabad مزراباد
- Village
- Location within Iran
- Coordinates: 32°45′54″N 59°19′17″E
- Country: Iran
- Province: South Khorasan
- County: Birjand
- Bakhsh: Central
- Rural District: Baqeran

Population (2006)
  - Total: 46
- Time zone: UTC+3:30 (IRST)
  - Summer (DST): UTC+4:30 (IRDT)

Mazrabad (Persian: مزراباد, also Romanized as Mazrābād and Marzābād) is a village in Baqeran Rural District, in the Central District of Birjand County, South Khorasan Province, Iran. At the time of the 2006 census, its population was 46, in 20 families.
