= Farrokhabad, Esmaili =

Farrokhabad فرخ اباد
- Village
- Location within Iran
- Coordinates: 28°13′00″N 57°33′06″E
- Country: Iran
- Province: Kerman
- County: Anbarabad
- Bakhsh: Esmaili
- Rural District: Esmaili

Population (2006)
  - Total: 223
- Time zone: UTC+3:30 (IRST)
  - Summer (DST): UTC+4:30 (IRDT)

Farrokhabad (Persian: فرخ اباد, also Romanized as Farrokhābād) is a village in Esmaili Rural District, Esmaili District, Anbarabad County, Kerman Province, Iran. At the 2006 census, its population was 223, in 46 families.
