= Naqdi Rural District =

Rural district in Ardabil province, Iran

Naqdi Rural District Persian: دهستان نقدئ
- Rural District
- Location within Iran
- Coordinates: 38°29′N 47°58′E
- Country: Iran
- Province: Ardabil
- County: Meshgin Shahr
- District: Meshgin-e Sharqi
- Established: 1987
- Capital: Naqdi-ye Olya

Population (2016)
  - Total: 1,949
- Time zone: UTC+3:30 (IRST)

Naqdi Rural District (Persian: دهستان نقدئ) is in Meshgin-e Sharqi District of Meshgin Shahr County, Ardabil province, Iran. Its capital is the village of Naqdi-ye Olya.

== Demographics ==
=== Population ===
At the time of the 2006 National Census, the rural district's population was 3,582 in 846 households. There were 2,741 inhabitants in 809 households at the following census of 2011. The 2016 census measured the population of the rural district as 1,949 in 731 households. The most populous of its 17 villages was Naqdi-ye Olya, with 738 people.

=== Other villages in the rural district ===
- Aghcheh Qeshlaq
- Arbab Kandi
- Chenaq Bolagh
- Dash Bolaghi
- Jamush Olan-e Olya
- Jamush Olan-e Sofla
- Mesdaraq
- Naqdi-ye Sofla
- Pirazmeyan
- Qilpenlui-ye Olya
- Qilpenlui-ye Sofla
- Shahab ol Din
- Shush Bolagh
