= Shahrak-e Esteqlal, Fars =

Shahrak-e Esteqlal شهرک استقلال
- Village
- Location within Iran
- Coordinates: 29°44′57″N 52°25′18″E
- Country: Iran
- Province: Fars
- County: Shiraz
- Bakhsh: Central
- Rural District: Derak

Population (2006)
  - Total: 6,519
- Time zone: UTC+3:30 (IRST)
  - Summer (DST): UTC+4:30 (IRDT)

Shahrak-e Esteqlal (Persian: شهرک استقلال, also Romanized as Shahrak-e Esteqlāl) is a village in Derak Rural District, in the Central District of Shiraz County, Fars province, Iran. At the 2006 census, its population was 6,519, in 1,617 families.
