= Ab Bahar-e Do =

Ab Bahar-e Do اب بهاردو
- Village
- Location within Iran
- Coordinates: 32°03′37″N 49°11′39″E
- Country: Iran
- Province: Khuzestan
- County: Masjed Soleyman
- Bakhsh: Central
- Rural District: Jahangiri

Population (2006)
  - Total: 54
- Time zone: UTC+3:30 (IRST)
  - Summer (DST): UTC+4:30 (IRDT)

Ab Bahar-e Do (Persian: اب بهاردو, also Romanized as Āb Bahār-e Do; also known as Ābahār, Āb Bahār, and Āb-e Bahār) is a village in Jahangiri Rural District, in the Central District of Masjed Soleyman County, Khuzestan province, Iran. At the 2006 census, its population was 54, in 13 families.
