= Fakhrabad, Zirkuh =

Fakhrabad فخراباد
- Village
- Location within Iran
- Coordinates: 33°24′44″N 59°58′54″E
- Country: Iran
- Province: South Khorasan
- County: Zirkuh
- Bakhsh: Central District
- Rural District: Zirkuh

Population (2006)
  - Total: 214
- Time zone: UTC+3:30 (IRST)
  - Summer (DST): UTC+4:30 (IRDT)

Fakhrabad (Persian: فخراباد, also Romanized as Fakhrābād) is a village in Zirkuh Rural District, Central District, Zirkuh County, South Khorasan Province, Iran. At the 2006 census, its population was 214, in 57 families.
