= Cham Sorkh, Kermanshah =

Cham Sorkh چم سرخ
- Village
- Location within Iran
- Coordinates: 34°22′59″N 47°47′11″E
- Country: Iran
- Province: Kermanshah
- County: Sahneh
- Bakhsh: Central
- Rural District: Sahneh

Population (2006)
  - Total: 111
- Time zone: UTC+3:30 (IRST)
  - Summer (DST): UTC+4:30 (IRDT)

Cham Sorkh (Persian: چم سرخ; also known as Jam Sorkh) is a village in Sahneh Rural District, in the Central District of Sahneh County, Kermanshah Province, Iran. At the 2006 census, its population was 111, in 25 families.
