= Fakhrabad, Mehriz =

Fakhrabad فخراباد
- Village
- Location within Iran
- Coordinates: 31°36′32″N 54°14′57″E
- Country: Iran
- Province: Yazd
- County: Mehriz
- Bakhsh: Central
- Rural District: Miankuh

Population (2006)
  - Total: 44
- Time zone: UTC+3:30 (IRST)
  - Summer (DST): UTC+4:30 (IRDT)

Fakhrabad (Persian: فخراباد, also Romanized as Fakhrābād) is a village in Miankuh Rural District, in the Central District of Mehriz County, Yazd Province, Iran. At the 2006 census, its population was 44, in 19 families.
