= Noqadi =

Noqadi نقدي
- Village
- Location within Iran
- Coordinates: 38°51′52″N 47°25′18″E
- Country: Iran
- Province: East Azerbaijan
- County: Ahar
- Bakhsh: Hurand
- Rural District: Dodangeh

Population (2006)
  - Total: 92
- Time zone: UTC+3:30 (IRST)
  - Summer (DST): UTC+4:30 (IRDT)

Noqadi (Persian: نقدي, also Romanized as Noqadī; also known as Naqadeh) is a village in Dodangeh Rural District, Hurand District, Ahar County, East Azerbaijan Province, Iran. At the 2006 census, its population was 92, in 22 families.
