= Fakhrabad, Ardabil =

City in Ardabil province, Iran

Fakhrabad Persian: فخراباد
- City
- Location within Iran
- Coordinates: 38°31′26″N 47°51′45″E
- Country: Iran
- Province: Ardabil
- County: Meshgin Shahr
- District: Meshgin-e Sharqi
- Established as a city: 2007

Population (2016)
  - Total: 999
- Time zone: UTC+3:30 (IRST)

Fakhrabad (Persian: فخراباد) (Note: Also romanized as Fakhrābād) is a city in Meshgin-e Sharqi District of Meshgin Shahr County, Ardabil province, Iran, serving as the administrative center for Qarah Su Rural District.

== Demographics ==
=== Population ===
At the time of the 2006 National Census, Fakhrabad's population was 1,282 in 334 households, when it was a village in Qarah Su Rural District. The following census in 2011 counted 1,114 people in 357 households, by which time the village had been elevated to the status of a city. The 2016 census measured the population of the city as 999 people in 364 households.
