= Dehloran =

City in Ilam province, Iran

Dehloran دیلران
- City
- Location within Iran Location within Ilam Province
- Coordinates: 32°41′21″N 47°16′08″E
- Country: Iran
- Province: Ilam
- County: Dehloran
- District: Central

Government
  - Governor: Latif Sadeghi

Population (2016)
  - Total: 32,941
- Time zone: UTC+3:30 (IRST)

Dehloran (Persian: دهلران) (Note: Also romanized as Dehlorān) is a city in the Central District of Dehloran County, Ilam province, Iran, serving as capital of both the county and of the district.

== Demographics ==
=== Language and ethnicity ===
Dehloran traditionally had a mixed population of Lurs and Kurds.

=== Population ===
At the time of the 2006 National Census, the city's population was 27,602 in 5,787 households. The following census in 2011 counted 30,989 people in 7,623 households. The 2016 census measured the population of the city as 32,941 people in 9,204 households.

== Geography ==
=== Location ===
The city is located in the northern part of Dehloran Plain and lies along Road 64, near the Iraqi border. A national natural monument lies in the north-eastern part of the city.

=== Dehloran plain ===
The ancient site of Chogha Sefid is just to the west of the village. Culturally, the plain is known as a part of "Greater Susiana."

Dehloran Plain in the south of Ilam province, along with the Susiana Plain in Khuzestan to the southwest, has been the subject of the longest and most extensive archaeological research in Iran. These two areas had been culturally very similar during the Chalcolithic age. The important sites on Dehloran Plain are Ali Kosh, Tepe Farukhabad, Chogha Sefid, and Tepe Sabz.
