= Faqirabad, Kerman =

Faqirabad فقيراباد
- Village
- Location within Iran
- Coordinates: 28°56′58″N 58°30′57″E
- Country: Iran
- Province: Kerman
- County: Narmashir
- Bakhsh: Rud Ab
- Rural District: Rud Ab-e Sharqi

Population (2006)
  - Total: 387
- Time zone: UTC+3:30 (IRST)
  - Summer (DST): UTC+4:30 (IRDT)

Faqirabad (Persian: فقيراباد, also Romanized as Faqīrābād; also known as Faghir Abad) is a village in Rud Ab-e Sharqi Rural District, Rud Ab District, Narmashir County, Kerman Province, Iran. At the 2006 census, its population was 387, in 96 families.
