= Farrokhabad, Rafsanjan =

Farrokhabad فرخ اباد
- Village
- Location within Iran
- Coordinates: 30°25′19″N 56°06′31″E
- Country: Iran
- Province: Kerman
- County: Rafsanjan
- Bakhsh: Central
- Rural District: Qasemabad

Population (2006)
  - Total: 73
- Time zone: UTC+3:30 (IRST)
  - Summer (DST): UTC+4:30 (IRDT)

Farrokhabad (Persian: فرخ اباد, also Romanized as Farrokhābād; also known as Farrokhābād-e Raẕavī) is a village in Qasemabad Rural District, in the Central District of Rafsanjan County, Kerman Province, Iran. At the 2006 census, its population was 73, in 16 families.
