= Fakhrabad-e Yek =

Fakhrabad-e Yek فخر آباد1
- Village
- Location within Iran
- Coordinates: 30°34′48″N 56°51′44″E
- Country: Iran
- Province: Kerman
- County: Kerman
- Bakhsh: Chatrud
- Rural District: Moezziyeh

Population (2006)
  - Total: 60
- Time zone: UTC+3:30 (IRST)
  - Summer (DST): UTC+4:30 (IRDT)

Fakhrabad-e Yek (Persian: فخر آباد1, also Romanized as Fakhrābād-e Yek; also known as Fakhrābād) is a village in Moezziyeh Rural District, Chatrud District, Kerman County, Kerman Province, Iran. At the 2006 census, its population was 60, in 20 families.
