= Farrokhabad, Nishapur =

Farrokhabad فرخ اباد
- Village
- Location within Iran
- Coordinates: 36°11′12″N 58°46′13″E
- Country: Iran
- Province: Razavi Khorasan
- County: Nishapur
- Bakhsh: Central
- Rural District: Rivand

Population (2006)
  - Total: 132
- Time zone: UTC+3:30 (IRST)
  - Summer (DST): UTC+4:30 (IRDT)

Farrokhabad (Persian: فرخ اباد, also Romanized as Farrokhābād) is a village in Rivand Rural District, in the Central District of Nishapur County, Razavi Khorasan Province, Iran. At the 2006 census, its population was 132, in 38 families.
