= Shahrak-e Vahdat, Khuzestan =

Shahrak-e Vahdat شهرك وحدت
- Village
- Location within Iran
- Coordinates: 30°35′51″N 50°19′02″E
- Country: Iran
- Province: Khuzestan
- County: Behbahan
- Bakhsh: Central
- Rural District: Howmeh

Population (2006)
  - Total: 1,094
- Time zone: UTC+3:30 (IRST)
  - Summer (DST): UTC+4:30 (IRDT)

Shahrak-e Vahdat (Persian: شهرك وحدت, also Romanized as Shahrak-e Vaḩdat) is a village in Howmeh Rural District, in the Central District of Behbahan County, Khuzestan Province, Iran. At the 2006 census, its population was 1,094, in 205 families.
