= Patak-e Beygdeli =

Village in Khuzestan, Iran

Patak-e Beygdeli پتك بيگدلي
- Village
- Location within Iran
- Coordinates: 31°16′49″N 49°52′36″E
- Country: Iran
- Province: Khuzestan
- County: Bagh-e Malek
- Bakhsh: Meydavud
- Rural District: Saroleh

Population (2006)
  - Total: 949
- Time zone: UTC+3:30 (IRST)
  - Summer (DST): UTC+4:30 (IRDT)

Patak-e Beygdeli (Persian: پتك بيگدلي, also Romanized as Patak-e Beygdelī; also known as Patak Beykdelī, Patak-e Begdelī, and Patik Bagdolli) is a village in Saroleh Rural District, Meydavud District, Bagh-e Malek County, Khuzestan Province, Iran. At the 2006 census, its population was 949, in 180 families.
