= Noqaddeh, Hamadan =

Noqaddeh نقده
- Village
- Location within Iran
- Coordinates: 34°30′49″N 48°23′48″E
- Country: Iran
- Province: Hamadan
- County: Tuyserkan
- Bakhsh: Central
- Rural District: Hayaquq-e Nabi

Population (2006)
  - Total: 589
- Time zone: UTC+3:30 (IRST)
  - Summer (DST): UTC+4:30 (IRDT)

Noqaddeh (Persian: نقده, also Romanized as Naqadeh and Noqqadeh; also known as Naqdī and Noqaddī) is a village in Hayaquq-e Nabi Rural District, in the Central District of Tuyserkan County, Hamadan Province, Iran. At the 2006 census, its population was 589, in 129 families.
