= Farrokhabad, Chaharmahal and Bakhtiari =

Farrokhabad فرخ اباد
- Village
- Location within Iran
- Coordinates: 32°09′17″N 50°23′14″E
- Country: Iran
- Province: Chaharmahal and Bakhtiari
- County: Kuhrang
- Bakhsh: Bazoft
- Rural District: Doab

Population (2006)
  - Total: 49
- Time zone: UTC+3:30 (IRST)
  - Summer (DST): UTC+4:30 (IRDT)

Farrokhabad (Persian: فرخ اباد, also Romanized as Farrokhābād) is a village in Doab Rural District, Bazoft District, Kuhrang County, Chaharmahal and Bakhtiari Province, Iran. At the 2006 census, its population was 49, in 9 families. The village is populated by Lurs.
