= Emamzadeh Abbas, Mazandaran =

Emamzadeh Abbas امامزاده عباس
- Village
- Location within Iran
- Coordinates: 36°20′39″N 52°39′16″E
- Country: Iran
- Province: Mazandaran
- County: Babol
- Bakhsh: Bandpey-ye Sharqi
- Rural District: Sajjadrud

Population (2006)
  - Total: 389
- Time zone: UTC+3:30 (IRST)
  - Summer (DST): UTC+4:30 (IRDT)

Emamzadeh Abbas (Persian: امامزاده عباس, also Romanized as Emāmzādeh ‘Abbās) is a village in Sajjadrud Rural District, Bandpey-ye Sharqi District, Babol County, Mazandaran Province, Iran. At the 2006 census, its population was 389, in 85 families.
