= Sar Kamar, Chaharmahal and Bakhtiari =

Sar Kamar سركمر
- Village
- Location within Iran
- Coordinates: 31°26′27″N 50°33′46″E
- Country: Iran
- Province: Chaharmahal and Bakhtiari
- County: Lordegan
- Bakhsh: Manj
- Rural District: Barez

Population (2006)
  - Total: 160
- Time zone: UTC+3:30 (IRST)
  - Summer (DST): UTC+4:30 (IRDT)

Sar Kamar (Persian: سركمر; also known as Sar Kamareh) is a village in Barez Rural District, Manj District, Lordegan County, Chaharmahal and Bakhtiari Province, Iran. At the 2006 census, its population was 160, in 27 families.
