= Fakhrabad, Bardsir =

Fakhrabad فخر اباد
- Village
- Location within Iran
- Coordinates: 29°57′09″N 56°34′11″E
- Country: Iran
- Province: Kerman
- County: Bardsir
- Bakhsh: Central
- Rural District: Mashiz

Population (2006)
  - Total: 58
- Time zone: UTC+3:30 (IRST)
  - Summer (DST): UTC+4:30 (IRDT)

Fakhrabad (Persian: فخر اباد, also Romanized as Fakhrābād; also known as Fakhrābād-e Pā’īn) is a village in Mashiz Rural District, in the Central District of Bardsir County, Kerman Province, Iran. At the 2006 census, its population was 58, in 13 families.
