= Kohneh Patak =

Kohneh Patak كهنه پتک
- Village
- Location within Iran
- Coordinates: 36°56′04″N 50°36′42″E
- Country: Iran
- Province: Mazandaran
- County: Ramsar
- Bakhsh: Central
- Rural District: Sakht Sar

Population (2006)
  - Total: 27
- Time zone: UTC+3:30 (IRST)

Kohneh Patak (Persian: كهنه پتک) is a village in Sakht Sar Rural District, in the Central District of Ramsar County, Mazandaran Province, Iran. At the 2016 census, its population was 11, in 4 families. Down from 27 in 2006.
