= Shahrak-e Vahdat, Kurdistan =

Shahrak-e Vahdat شهرك وحدت
- Village
- Location within Iran
- Coordinates: 35°07′18″N 47°03′54″E
- Country: Iran
- Province: Kurdistan
- County: Sanandaj
- Bakhsh: Central
- Rural District: Naran

Population (2006)
  - Total: 89
- Time zone: UTC+3:30 (IRST)
  - Summer (DST): UTC+4:30 (IRDT)

Shahrak-e Vahdat (Persian: شهرك وحدت, also Romanized as Shahrakvahdat) is a village in Naran Rural District, in the Central District of Sanandaj County, Kurdistan Province, Iran. At the 2006 census, its population was 89, in 21 families. The village is populated by Kurds.
