= Fakhrabad, Marvdasht =

Fakhrabad فخراباد
- Village
- Location within Iran
- Coordinates: 29°58′14″N 52°42′03″E
- Country: Iran
- Province: Fars
- County: Marvdasht
- Bakhsh: Central
- Rural District: Ramjerd-e Yek

Population (2006)
  - Total: 458
- Time zone: UTC+3:30 (IRST)
  - Summer (DST): UTC+4:30 (IRDT)

Fakhrabad (Persian: فخراباد, also Romanized as Fakhrābād; also known as Fakhrābād-e Rāmjerd and Fakhr Abad Ramjerd) is a village in Ramjerd-e Yek Rural District, in the Central District of Marvdasht County, Fars province, Iran. At the 2006 census, its population was 458, in 99 families.
