= Meymeh, Ilam =

City in Ilam province, Iran

Meymeh Persian: ميمه
- City
- Location within Iran Location within Ilam Province
- Coordinates: 33°13′36″N 46°55′11″E
- Country: Iran
- Province: Ilam
- County: Dehloran
- District: Sarab Meymeh

Population (2016)
  - Total: 1,913
- Time zone: UTC+3:30 (IRST)

Meymeh (Persian: ميمه) is a city in, and the capital of, Sarab Meymeh District of Dehloran County, Ilam province, Iran.

== Demographics ==
=== Ethnicity ===
The city is populated by Kurds.

=== Population ===
At the time of the 2006 National Census, the city's population was 2,277 in 437 households, when it was in Zarrinabad District. The following census in 2011 counted 2,636 people in 664 households. The 2016 census measured the population of the city as 1,913 people in 569 households, by which time Meymeh had been separated from the district in the formation of Sarab Meymeh District.
