= Farrokhabad-e Olya, Delfan =

Farrokhabad-e Olya فرخ ابادعليا
- Village
- Location within Iran
- Coordinates: 34°10′00″N 47°41′00″E
- Country: Iran
- Province: Lorestan
- County: Delfan
- Bakhsh: Kakavand
- Rural District: Kakavand-e Sharqi

Population (2006)
  - Total: 47
- Time zone: UTC+3:30 (IRST)
  - Summer (DST): UTC+4:30 (IRDT)

Farrokhabad-e Olya (Persian: فرخ ابادعليا, also Romanized as Farrokhābād-e ‘Olyā) is a village in Kakavand-e Sharqi Rural District, Kakavand District, Delfan County, Lorestan Province, Iran. At the 2006 census, its population was 47, in 9 families.
