= Dasht-e Abbas District =

District in Ilam province, Iran

Dasht-e Abbas District Persian: بخش دشت عباس
- District
- Location within Iran Location within Ilam Province
- Coordinates: 32°20′01″N 47°46′07″E
- Country: Iran
- Province: Ilam
- County: Dehloran
- Capital: Dasht-e Abbas
- Time zone: UTC+3:30 (IRST)

Dasht-e Abbas District (Persian: بخش دشت عباس) is in Dehloran County, Ilam province, Iran. Its capital is the village of Dasht-e Abbas, whose population at the time of the 2016 National Census was 295 people in 74 households.

== History ==
In 2017, Abughoveyr and Dasht-e Abbas Rural Districts were separated from Musian District in the formation of Dasht-e Abbas District.

== Demographics ==
=== Administrative divisions ===
Dasht-e Abbas District
Administrative Divisions
Abughoveyr RD
Dasht-e Abbas RD
RD = Rural District
