= Abughoveyr Rural District =

Rural district in Ilam province, Iran

Abughoveyr Rural District Persian: دهستان ابوغوير
- Rural District
- Location within Iran Location within Ilam Province
- Coordinates: 32°13′37″N 47°41′58″E
- Country: Iran
- Province: Ilam
- County: Dehloran
- District: Dasht-e Abbas
- Capital: Abughoveyr

Population (2016)
  - Total: 1,813
- Time zone: UTC+3:30 (IRST)

Abughoveyr Rural District (Persian: دهستان ابوغوير) is in Dasht-e Abbas District of Dehloran County, Ilam province, Iran. Its capital is the village of Abughoveyr.

== Demographics ==
=== Population ===
At the time of the 2006 National Census, the rural district's population (as a part of Musiyan District) was 1,142 in 190 households. There were 1,915 inhabitants in 288 households at the following census of 2011. The 2016 census measured the population of the rural district as 1,813 in 254 households. The most populous of its 22 villages was Abughoveyr, with 320 people.

In 2017, the rural district was separated from the district in the establishment of Dasht-e Abbas District.
