= Farrokhabad-e Sofla =

Farrokhabad-e Sofla فرخ ابادسفلي
- Village
- Location within Iran
- Coordinates: 33°25′00″N 47°31′26″E
- Country: Iran
- Province: Lorestan
- County: Kuhdasht
- Bakhsh: Central
- Rural District: Gol Gol

Population (2006)
  - Total: 355
- Time zone: UTC+3:30 (IRST)
  - Summer (DST): UTC+4:30 (IRDT)

Farrokhabad-e Sofla (Persian: فرخ ابادسفلي, also Romanized as Farrokhābād-e Soflá; also known as Farrokhābād and Fakhrābād) is a village in Gol Gol Rural District, in the Central District of Kuhdasht County, Lorestan Province, Iran. At the 2006 census, its population was 355, in 69 families.
