= Potoky =

- Municipality
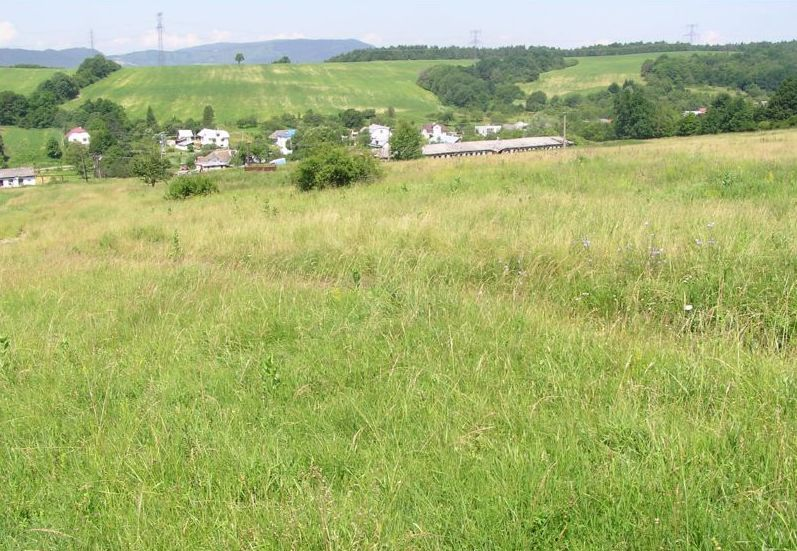

- Flag

- Location of Potoky in the Prešov Region Location of Potoky in Slovakia
- Coordinates: 49.25°N 21.63°E
- Country: Slovakia
- Region: Prešov Region
- District: Stropkov District
- First mentioned: 1551

Area
  - Total: 5.58 km^{2} (2.15 sq mi)
- Elevation: 232 m (761 ft)

Population (2025)
  - Total: 84
- Time zone: UTC+1 (CET)
  - Summer (DST): UTC+2 (CEST)
- Postal code: 910 1
- Area code: +421 54
- Vehicle registration plate (until 2022): SP
- Website: potoky.sk

Potoky (Hungarian: Pataki, until 1899: Potoka) is a village and municipality in Stropkov District in the Prešov Region of north-eastern Slovakia.

== History ==
In historical records the village was first mentioned in 1551.

== Geography ==
The municipality lies at an altitude of 232 metres (761 ft) and covers an area of 5.58 km^{2} (2.15 sq mi) (2025).

== Population ==
Population statistic (10 years)
Year	1995	2005	2015	2025
Count	98	91	91	84
Difference		−7.14%	+0%	−7.69%

Population statistic
Year	2024	2025
Count	82	84
Difference		+2.43%

It has a population of 84 people (31 December 2025).

=== Ethnicity ===
Census 2021 (1+ %)
Ethnicity	Number	Fraction
Slovak	80	90.9%
Rusyn	31	35.22%
Not found out	3	3.4%
Czech	2	2.27%
Albanian	1	1.13%
Total	88	

In year 2021 was 88 people by ethnicity 80 as Slovak, 31 as Rusyn, 3 as Not found out, 2 as Czech and 1 as Albanian.

Note on population: The difference values of population numbers in the table "Population statistic" and in the sections "Ethnicity" & "Religion" is caused by the use of various statistical methods.

=== Religion ===
Census 2021 (1+ %)
Religion	Number	Fraction
Greek Catholic Church	71	80.68%
Not found out	7	7.95%
Roman Catholic Church	4	4.55%
None	2	2.27%
Eastern Orthodox Church	1	1.14%
Buddhism	1	1.14%
Bahá'i Community	1	1.14%
Ad hoc movements	1	1.14%
Total	88	

In year 2021 was 88 people by religion 71 from Greek Catholic Church, 7 from Not found out, 4 from Roman Catholic Church, 2 from None, 1 from Eastern Orthodox Church, 1 from Buddhism, 1 from Bahá'i Community and 1 from Ad hoc movements.
