= Farrokhabad-e Olya, Kuhdasht =

Farrokhabad-e Olya فرخ ابادعليا
- Village
- Location within Iran
- Coordinates: 33°25′00″N 47°31′26″E
- Country: Iran
- Province: Lorestan
- County: Kuhdasht
- Bakhsh: Central
- Rural District: Gol Gol

Population (2006)
  - Total: 237
- Time zone: UTC+3:30 (IRST)
  - Summer (DST): UTC+4:30 (IRDT)

Farrokhabad-e Olya (Persian: فرخ ابادعليا, also Romanized as Farrokhābād-e ‘Olyā; also known as Farrokhābād and Fakhrābād) is a village in Gol Gol Rural District, in the Central District of Kuhdasht County, Lorestan Province, Iran. At the 2006 census, its population was 237, in 44 families.
