= Sarab Meymeh District =

District in Ilam province, Iran

Sarab Meymeh District Persian: بخش سراب میمه
- District
- Location within Iran Location within Ilam Province
- Coordinates: 33°12′36″N 46°59′42″E
- Country: Iran
- Province: Ilam
- County: Dehloran
- Capital: Meymeh

Population (2016)
  - Total: 2,766
- Time zone: UTC+3:30 (IRST)

Sarab Meymeh District (Persian: بخش سراب میمه) is in Dehloran County, Ilam province, Iran. Its capital is the city of Meymeh.

== History ==
In 2013, Meymeh and several villages were separated from Zarrinabad District in the formation of Sarab Meymeh District.

== Demographics ==
=== Population ===
At the time of the 2016 National Census, the district's population was 2,766 inhabitants in 798 households.

=== Administrative divisions ===
Sarab Meymeh District Population
Administrative Divisions	2016
Gurab RD	626
Takhtan RD	227
Meymeh (city)	1,913
Total	2,766
RD = Rural District
