= Seyd Nasraldin Rural District =

Rural district in Ilam province, Iran

Seyd Nasraldin Rural District Persian: دهستان سید ناصرالدین
- Rural District
- Location within Iran Location within Ilam Province
- Coordinates: 33°03′52″N 46°48′32″E
- Country: Iran
- Province: Ilam
- County: Dehloran
- District: Zarrinabad
- Capital: Pahleh

Population (2016)
  - Total: 1,243
- Time zone: UTC+3:30 (IRST)

Seyd Nasraldin Rural District (Persian: دهستان سید ناصرالدین) is in Zarrinabad District of Dehloran County, Ilam province, Iran. It is administered from the city of Pahleh.

== Demographics ==
=== Population ===
At the time of the 2006 National Census, the rural district's population was 2,242 in 432 households. There were 1,979 inhabitants in 438 households at the following census of 2011. The 2016 census measured the population of the rural district as 1,243 in 319 households. The most populous of its 22 villages was Zarab, with 440 people.
