= Anaran Rural District =

Rural district in Ilam province, Iran

Anaran Rural District Persian: دهستان اناران
- Rural District
- Location within Iran Location within Ilam Province
- Coordinates: 32°44′11″N 46°57′32″E
- Country: Iran
- Province: Ilam
- County: Dehloran
- District: Central
- Capital: Bisheh Deraz

Population (2016)
  - Total: 5,363
- Time zone: UTC+3:30 (IRST)

Anaran Rural District (Persian: دهستان اناران) is in the Central District of Dehloran County, Ilam province, Iran. Its capital is the village of Bisheh Deraz.

== Demographics ==
=== Population ===
At the time of the 2006 National Census, the rural district's population was 4,709 in 912 households. There were 5,953 inhabitants in 1,212 households at the following census of 2011. The 2016 census measured the population of the rural district as 5,363 in 1,316 households. The most populous of its 46 villages was Shahrak-e Vahdat, with 937 people.
