= Nahranbar Rural District =

Rural district in Ilam province, Iran

Nahranbar Rural District Persian: دهستان نهرعنبر
- Rural District
- Location within Iran Location within Ilam Province
- Coordinates: 32°28′00″N 47°24′30″E
- Country: Iran
- Province: Ilam
- County: Dehloran
- District: Musiyan
- Capital: Bareh Bijeh

Population (2016)
  - Total: 4,806
- Time zone: UTC+3:30 (IRST)

Nahranbar Rural District (Persian: دهستان نهرعنبر) is in Musiyan District of Dehloran County, Ilam province, Iran. Its capital is the village of Bareh Bijeh.

== Demographics ==
=== Population ===
At the time of the 2006 National Census, the rural district's population was 4,037 in 662 households. There were 5,153 inhabitants in 908 households at the following census of 2011. The 2016 census measured the population of the rural district as 4,806 in 1,088 households. The most populous of its 30 villages was Nahranbar, with 1051 people.
