= Seyd Ebrahim Rural District =

Rural district in Ilam province, Iran

Seyd Ebrahim Rural District Persian: دهستان سيد ابراهيم
- Rural District
- Location within Iran Location within Ilam Province
- Coordinates: 32°58′52″N 47°04′10″E
- Country: Iran
- Province: Ilam
- County: Dehloran
- District: Zarrinabad
- Capital: Bardi

Population (2016)
  - Total: 1,114
- Time zone: UTC+3:30 (IRST)

Seyd Ebrahim Rural District (Persian: دهستان سيد ابراهيم) is in Zarrinabad District of Dehloran County, Ilam province, Iran. Its capital is the village of Bardi.

== Demographics ==
=== Population ===
At the time of the 2006 National Census, the rural district's population was 1,547 in 290 households. There were 1,350 inhabitants in 300 households at the following census of 2011. The 2016 census measured the population of the rural district as 1,114 in 293 households. The most populous of its 12 villages was Bardi, with 771 people.
