= Dasht-e Abbas Rural District =

Rural district in Ilam province, Iran

Dasht-e Abbas Rural District Persian: دهستان دشت عباس
- Rural District
- Location within Iran Location within Ilam Province
- Coordinates: 32°22′15″N 47°48′58″E
- Country: Iran
- Province: Ilam
- County: Dehloran
- District: Dasht-e Abbas
- Capital: Dasht-e Abbas

Population (2016)
  - Total: 9,204
- Time zone: UTC+3:30 (IRST)

Dasht-e Abbas Rural District (Persian: دهستان دشت عباس) is in Dasht-e Abbas District of Dehloran County, Ilam province, Iran. Its capital is the village of Dasht-e Abbas.

== Demographics ==
=== Population ===
At the time of the 2006 National Census, the rural district's population (as a part of Musiyan District) was 8,525 in 1,335 households. There were 9,782 inhabitants in 1,962 households at the following census of 2011. The 2016 census measured the population of the rural district as 9,204 in 2,018 households. The most populous of its 71 villages was Shahrak-e Vali-ye Asr, with 942 people.

In 2017, the rural district was separated from the district in the formation of Dasht-e Abbas District.
