= Central District (Dehloran County) =

District in Ilam province, Iran

Central District (Dehloran County) Persian: بخش مرکزی شهرستان دهلران
- District
- Location within Iran Location within Ilam Province
- Coordinates: 32°44′11″N 46°57′32″E
- Country: Iran
- Province: Ilam
- County: Dehloran
- Capital: Dehloran

Population (2016)
  - Total: 38,304
- Time zone: UTC+3:30 (IRST)

The Central District of Dehloran County (Persian: بخش مرکزی شهرستان دهلران) is in Ilam province, Iran. Its capital is the city of Dehloran.

== Demographics ==
=== Population ===
At the time of the 2006 National Census, the district's population was 32,311 in 6,699 households. The following census in 2011 counted 36,942 people in 8,835 households. The 2016 census measured the population of the district as 38,304 inhabitants in 10,520 households.

=== Administrative divisions ===
Central District (Dehloran County) Population
Administrative Divisions	2006	2011	2016
Anaran RD	4,709	5,953	5,363
Dehloran (city)	27,602	30,989	32,941
Total	32,311	36,942	38,304
RD = Rural District
