= Zarrinabad District =

District in Ilam province, Iran

Zarrinabad District Persian: بخش زرین‌آباد
- District
- Location within Iran Location within Ilam Province
- Coordinates: 33°01′05″N 46°57′45″E
- Country: Iran
- Province: Ilam
- County: Dehloran
- Capital: Pahleh

Population (2016)
  - Total: 6,227
- Time zone: UTC+3:30 (IRST)

Zarrinabad District (Persian: بخش زرین‌آباد) is in Dehloran County, Ilam province, Iran. Its capital is the city of Pahleh.

== History ==
After the 2011 National Census, the city of Meymeh was separated from the district in the establishment of Sarab Meymeh District.

== Demographics ==
=== Population ===
At the time of the 2006 census, the district's population was 10,407 in 1,999 households. The following census in 2011 counted 10,030 people in 2,356 households. The 2016 census measured the population of the district as 6,227 inhabitants in 1,627 households.

=== Administrative divisions ===
Zarrinabad District Population
Administrative Divisions	2006	2011	2016
Seyd Ebrahim RD	1,547	1,350	1,114
Seyd Nasraldin RD	2,242	1,979	1,243
Meymeh (city) (Note: Transferred to Sarab Meymeh District)	2,277	2,636	
Pahleh (city)	4,341	4,065	3,870
Total	10,407	10,030	6,227
RD = Rural District
