= Musiyan District =

District in Ilam province, Iran

Musiyan District Persian: بخش موسیان
- District
- Location within Iran Location within Ilam Province
- Coordinates: 32°32′00″N 47°27′30″E
- Country: Iran
- Province: Ilam
- County: Dehloran
- Capital: Musiyan

Population (2016)
  - Total: 18,282
- Time zone: UTC+3:30 (IRST)

Musiyan District (Persian: بخش موسیان) is in Dehloran County, Ilam province, Iran. Its capital is the city of Musiyan.

== History ==
In 2017, Dalpari Rural District was established in the district, and Abughoveyr and Dasht-e Abbas Rural Districts were separated from it in the establishment of Dasht-e Abbas District.

== Demographics ==
=== Population ===
At the time of the 2006 National Census, the district's population was 16,275 in 2,678 households. The following census in 2011 counted 19,427 people in 3,722 households. The 2016 census measured the population of the district as 18,282 inhabitants in 4,002 households.

=== Administrative divisions ===
Musiyan District Population
Administrative Divisions	2006	2011	2016
Abughoveyr RD (Note: Transferred to Dasht-e Abbas District after the 2016 census)	1,142	1,915	1,813
Dalpari RD (Note: Established after the 2016 census)			
Dasht-e Abbas RD	8,525	9,782	9,204
Nahranbar RD	4,037	5,153	4,806
Musiyan (city)	2,571	2,577	2,459
Total	16,275	19,427	18,282
RD = Rural District
