= Meshgin-e Sharqi District =

District in Ardabil province, Iran

Meshgin-e Sharqi District Persian: بخش مشگین شرقی
- District
- Location within Iran
- Coordinates: 38°26′N 47°51′E
- Country: Iran
- Province: Ardabil
- County: Meshgin Shahr
- Established: 1995
- Capital: Lahrud

Population (2016)
  - Total: 12,663
- Time zone: UTC+3:30 (IRST)

Meshgin-e Sharqi District (Persian: بخش مشگین شرقی) is in Meshgin Shahr County, Ardabil province, Iran. Its capital is the city of Lahrud.

== History ==
The village of Fakhrabad was converted to a city in 2007.

== Demographics ==
=== Population ===
At the time of the 2006 National Census, the district's population was 17,627 in 4,467 households. The following census in 2011 counted 14,322 people in 4,343 households. The 2016 census measured the population of the district as 12,663 inhabitants living in 4,479 households.

=== Administrative divisions ===
Meshgin-e Sharqi District Population
| Administrative Divisions | 2006 | 2011 | 2016 |
|---|---|---|---|
| Lahrud RD | 5,630 | 3,928 | 4,329 |
| Naqdi RD | 3,582 | 2,741 | 1,949 |
| Qarah Su RD | 5,454 | 3,956 | 3,237 |
| Fakhrabad (city) | | 1,114 | 999 |
| Lahrud (city) | 2,961 | 2,583 | 2,149 |
| Total | 17,627 | 14,322 | 12,663 |
RD = Rural District
