= Dehloran County =

County in Ilam Province, Iran

Dehloran County Persian: شهرستان دهلران
- County
- Location of Dehloran County in Ilam province (bottom, green)

- Location of Ilam province in Iran
- Coordinates: 32°42′N 47°16′E
- Country: Iran
- Province: Ilam
- Capital: Dehloran
- Districts: Central, Dasht-e Abbas, Musiyan, Sarab Meymeh, Zarrinabad

Population (2016)
  - Total: 65,630
- Time zone: UTC+3:30 (IRST)

Dehloran County (Persian: شهرستان دهلران) is in Ilam Province, Iran. Its capital is the city of Dehloran.

== Demographics ==
=== Language ===
Dehloran County is mostly populated by Lur people and has minority of Arab in the southern part of the county.

== History ==
After the 2011 National Census, the city of Meymeh was separated from Zarrinabad District in the formation of Sarab Meymeh District, which was divided into the new Gurab and Takhtan Rural Districts.

In 2017, Dalpari Rural District was established in Musiyan District, and Abughoveyr and Dasht-e Abbas Rural Districts were separated from it in the formation of Dasht-e Abbas District.

=== Population ===
At the time of the 2006 census, the county's population was 58,993 in 11,376 households. The following census in 2011 counted 66,399 people in 14,852 households. The 2016 census measured the population of the county as 65,630 in 16,959 households.

=== Administrative divisions ===
Dehloran County's population history and administrative structure over three consecutive censuses are shown in the following table.

Dehloran County Population
Administrative Divisions	2006	2011	2016
Central District	32,311	36,942	38,304
Anaran RD	4,709	5,953	5,363
Dehloran (city)	27,602	30,989	32,941
Dasht-e Abbas District (Note: Established after the 2016 census)			
Abughoveyr RD			
Dasht-e Abbas RD			
Musiyan District	16,275	19,427	18,282
Abughoveyr RD	1,142	1,915	1,813
Dalpari RD			
Dasht-e Abbas RD	8,525	9,782	9,204
Nahranbar RD	4,037	5,153	4,806
Musiyan (city)	2,571	2,577	2,459
Sarab Meymeh District			2,766
Gurab RD			626
Takhtan RD			227
Meymeh (city)			1,913
Zarrinabad District	10,407	10,030	6,227
Seyd Ebrahim RD	1,547	1,350	1,114
Seyd Nasraldin RD	2,242	1,979	1,243
Meymeh (city)	2,277	2,636	
Pahleh (city)	4,341	4,065	3,870
Total	58,993	66,399	65,630
RD = Rural District

== See also ==
Media related to Dehloran County at Wikimedia Commons
