= Sati =

Sati or SATI may refer to:

== Entertainment ==
- Sati (film), a 1989 Bengali film by Aparna Sen and starring Shabana Azmi
- Sati (novel), a 1990 novel by Christopher Pike
- Sati (singer) (born 1976), Lithuanian singer
- Sati, a character in The Matrix Revolutions

== Institutes ==
- Samrat Ashok Technological Institute, a college in Vidisha, Madhya Pradesh, India
- South African Translators' Institute, an association in South Africa representing translators and other language practitioners

== Places ==
- Sati (castle), a medieval fortified town near Shkodër, Albania
- Hesar-e Sati, a village in Shahriar County, Tehran Province, Iran
- Sati-ye Olya, a village in Ardabil Province, Iran
- Sati-ye Sofla, a village in Ardabil Province, Iran
- Sati-ye Vosta, a village in Ardabil Province, Iran
- Sati, Sur, a village in Diyarbakır Province, Turkey

== People ==
- Sharaf al-Din Sati (died 1288), mystic, author, and manuscript producer
- Sati Beg, ruler of the Ilkhanate

== Religion ==
- Sati in Hinduism and Buddhism can refer to the following:
  - Sati (Hindu goddess), Shiva's first wife, and after her death, reincarnated as Shiva's next wife, Parvati.
  - Sati (Sanskrit: सती), a good and virtuous or faithful wife
  - Sati (Buddhism), awareness or skillful attentiveness in Buddhism
  - Sati (practice), historical Hindu practice of a widow immolating herself after her husband's death, usually on her husband's funeral pyre
    - Sati (Prevention) Act, 1987, India
- Sati in Ancient Egyptian religion can refer to Satis (goddess) or Sati, an Egyptian goddess

== See also ==
- Satis (disambiguation)
- Sathi (disambiguation)
- Dakshayani (disambiguation), another name of the Hindu goddess
- Sade Sati, the 7 1/2-year-long period of Saturn (Shani) in Indian astrology
- Sarti, an Italian language surname
- Sat (Sanskrit), a Sanskrit word meaning the true essence of an entity, species or existence
- Satti, a tribe found in Muree, Kotli sattian, Kahuta and adjoining areas of Rawalpindi Punjab, Pakistan
- Satti (food), a common barbeque in the southern Philippines, related to but distinct from Malaysian and Indonesian satay
