= Savareh =

Savareh (Persian: سواره) may refer to:

- Savareh, Ardabil
- Savareh, East Azerbaijan
- Savareh, Khuzestan
- Savareh, Kohgiluyeh and Boyer-Ahmad
