= Mizan, Iran =

Village in Ardabil province, Iran

Mizan Persian: ميزان
- Village
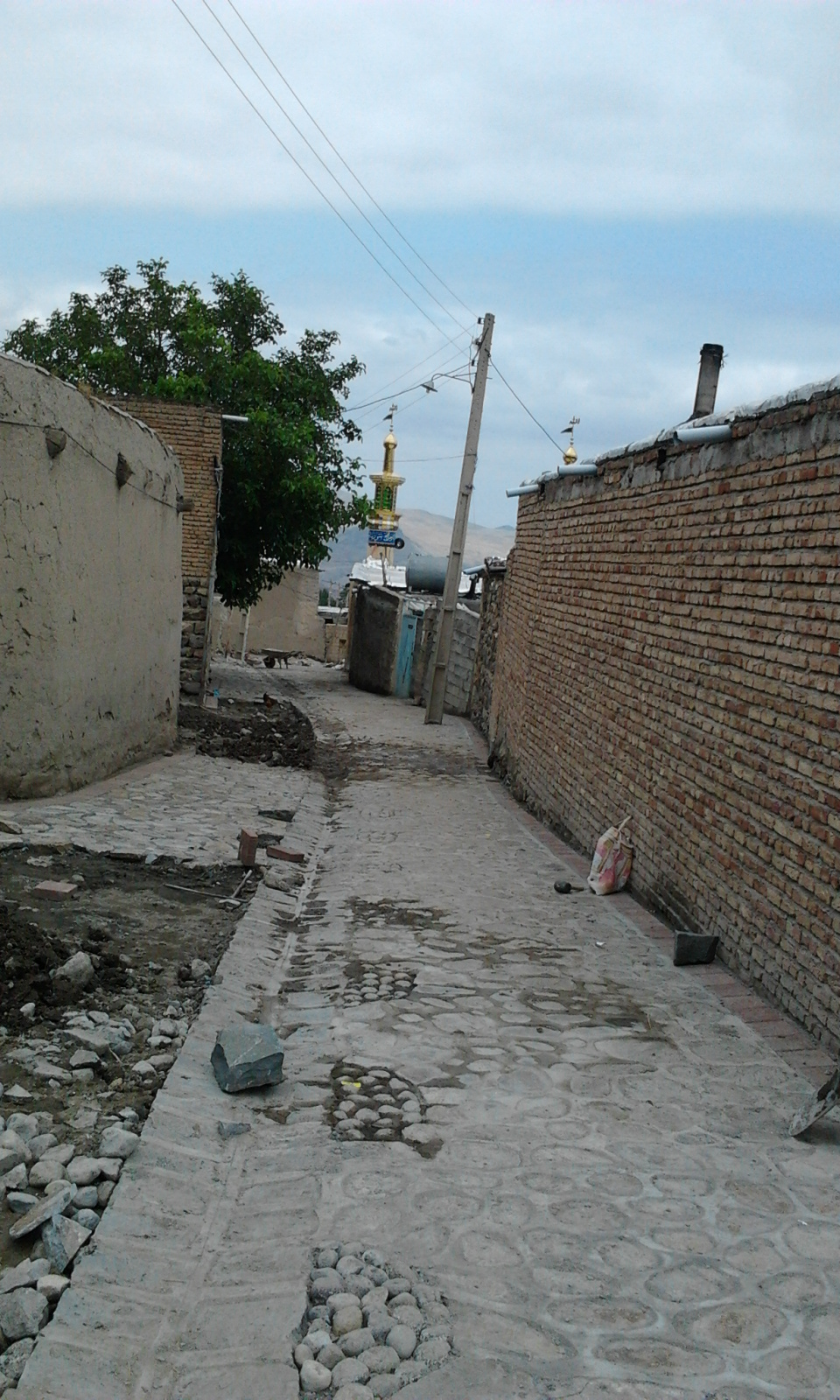
- Street in the village of Mizan

- Location within Iran
- Coordinates: 38°21′59″N 47°23′54″E
- Country: Iran
- Province: Ardabil
- County: Meshgin Shahr
- District: Qosabeh
- Rural District: Shaban

Population (2016)
  - Total: 343
- Time zone: UTC+3:30 (IRST)

Mizan (Persian: ميزان) (Note: Also romanized as Mīzān) is a village in Shaban Rural District of Qosabeh District in Meshgin Shahr County, Ardabil province, Iran.

== Demographics ==
=== Population ===
At the time of the 2006 National Census, the village's population was 632 in 143 households, when it was in the Central District. The following census in 2011 counted 606 people in 150 households. The 2016 census measured the population of the village as 343 people in 107 households, by which time the rural district had been separated from the district in the formation of Qosabeh District.
