= Kuh Kenar, Ardabil =

Village in Ardabil province, Iran

Kuh Kenar Persian: كوه كنار
- Village
- Location within Iran
- Coordinates: 38°18′56″N 47°25′34″E
- Country: Iran
- Province: Ardabil
- County: Meshgin Shahr
- District: Qosabeh
- Rural District: Shaban

Population (2016)
  - Total: 37
- Time zone: UTC+3:30 (IRST)

Kuh Kenar (Persian: كوه كنار) (Note: Also romanized as Kūh Kenār; also known as Kūh Ketār) is a village in Shaban Rural District of Qosabeh District in Meshgin Shahr County, Ardabil province, Iran.

== Demographics ==
=== Population ===
At the time of the 2006 National Census, the village's population was 169 in 38 households, when it was in the Central District. The following census in 2011 counted 112 people in 35 households. The 2016 census measured the population of the village as 37 people in 11 households, by which time the rural district had been separated from the district in the formation of Qosabeh District.
