= Dagh Kandi-ye Olya =

Village in Ardabil province, Iran

Dagh Kandi-ye Olya Persian: داغ كندي عليا
- Village
- Country: Iran
- Province: Ardabil
- County: Meshgin Shahr
- District: Qosabeh
- Rural District: Shaban

Population (2016)
  - Total: 27
- Time zone: UTC+3:30 (IRST)

Dagh Kandi-ye Olya (Persian: داغ كندي عليا) (Note: Also romanized as Dāgh Kandī-ye 'Olyā) is a village in Shaban Rural District of Qosabeh District in Meshgin Shahr County, Ardabil province, Iran.

== Demographics ==
=== Population ===
At the time of the 2006 National Census, the village's population was 58 in 13 households, when it was in the Central District. The following census in 2011 counted 31 people in eight households. The 2016 census measured the population of the village as 27 people in nine households, by which time the rural district had been separated from the district in the formation of Qosabeh District.
