= Seyyed Kandi =

Seyyed Kandi (Persian: سيدكندي) may refer to:

- Seyyed Kandi, Germi, Ardabil Province
- Seyyed Kandi, Meshgin Shahr, Ardabil Province
- Seyyed Kandi, East Azerbaijan
- Seyyed Kandi, Zanjan
