= Ahmad Beyglu =

Village in Ardabil province, Iran

Ahmad Beyglu Persian: احمدبيگلو
- Village
- Location within Iran
- Coordinates: 38°24′38″N 47°33′35″E
- Country: Iran
- Province: Ardabil
- County: Meshgin Shahr
- District: Qosabeh
- Rural District: Meshgin-e Gharbi

Population (2016)
  - Total: 1,133
- Time zone: UTC+3:30 (IRST)

Ahmad Beyglu (Persian: احمدبيگلو) (Note: Also romanized as Aḩmad Beyglū) is a village in Meshgin-e Gharbi Rural District of Qosabeh District in Meshgin Shahr County, Ardabil province, Iran.

== Demographics ==
=== Population ===
At the time of the 2006 National Census, the village's population was 1,385 in 328 households, when it was in the Central District. The following census in 2011 counted 1,231 people in 341 households. The 2016 census measured the population of the village as 1,133 people in 335 households, by which time the rural district had been separated from the district in the formation of Qosabeh District. It was the most populous village in its rural district.
