= Khanjar, Iran =

Village in Ardabil province, Iran

Khanjar Persian: خنجر
- Village
- Location within Iran
- Coordinates: 38°23′03″N 47°31′14″E
- Country: Iran
- Province: Ardabil
- County: Meshgin Shahr
- District: Qosabeh
- Rural District: Meshgin-e Gharbi

Population (2016)
  - Total: 350
- Time zone: UTC+3:30 (IRST)

Khanjar (Persian: خنجر) (Note: Also known as Khanjarlū) is a village in Meshgin-e Gharbi Rural District of Qosabeh District in Meshgin Shahr County, Ardabil province, Iran.

== Demographics ==
At the time of the 2006 National Census, the village's population was 347 in 85 households, when it was in the Central District. The following census in 2011 counted 347 people in 95 households. The 2016 census measured the population of the village as 350 people in 106 households, by which time the rural district had been separated from the district in the formation of Qosabeh District.
