= Bolus, Iran =

Village in Ardabil province, Iran

Bolus Persian: بلوس
- Village
- Location within Iran
- Coordinates: 38°21′15″N 47°32′37″E
- Country: Iran
- Province: Ardabil
- County: Meshgin Shahr
- District: Qosabeh
- Rural District: Meshgin-e Gharbi

Population (2016)
  - Total: 269
- Time zone: UTC+3:30 (IRST)

Bolus (Persian: بلوس) (Note: Also romanized as Bolūs) is a village in Meshgin-e Gharbi Rural District of Qosabeh District in Meshgin Shahr County, Ardabil province, Iran.

== Demographics ==
=== Population ===
At the time of the 2006 National Census, the village's population was 308 in 60 households, when it was in the Central District. The following census in 2011 counted 234 people in 58 households. The 2016 census measured the population of the village as 269 people in 82 households, by which time the rural district had been separated from the district in the formation of Qosabeh District.
