= Alamdar, Ardabil =

Village in Ardabil province, Iran

Alamdar Persian: علمدار
- Village
- Location within Iran
- Coordinates: 38°20′52″N 47°27′19″E
- Country: Iran
- Province: Ardabil
- County: Meshgin Shahr
- District: Qosabeh
- Rural District: Shaban

Population (2016)
  - Total: 143
- Time zone: UTC+3:30 (IRST)

Alamdar (Persian: علمدار) (Note: Also romanized as ‘Alamdār; also known as Alambār) is a village in Shaban Rural District of Qosabeh District in Meshgin Shahr County, Ardabil province, Iran.

== Demographics ==
=== Population ===
At the time of the 2006 National Census, the village's population was 183 in 41 households, when it was in the Central District. The following census in 2011 counted 123 people in 38 households. The 2016 census measured the population of the village as 143 people in 49 households, by which time the rural district had been separated from the district in the formation of Qosabeh District.
