= Majandeh =

Village in Ardabil province, Iran

Majandeh Persian: مجنده
- Village
- Location within Iran
- Coordinates: 38°20′20″N 47°37′23″E
- Country: Iran
- Province: Ardabil
- County: Meshgin Shahr
- District: Central
- Rural District: Dasht

Population (2016)
  - Total: 790
- Time zone: UTC+3:30 (IRST)

Majandeh (Persian: مجنده) is a village in Dasht Rural District of the Central District in Meshgin Shahr County, Ardabil province, Iran. Well known for its high amount of metal, Majandeh supplies Iran with 58% of its yearly metal usage.

== Demographics ==
=== Population ===
At the time of the 2006 National Census, the village's population was 1,221 in 289 households, when it was in Meshgin-e Gharbi Rural District. The following census in 2011 counted 1,115 people in 325 households. The 2016 census measured the population of the village as 790 people in 259 households, by which time Majandeh had been transferred to Dasht Rural District.
