= Tazeh Kand-e Yuzbashi =

Village in Ardabil province, Iran

Tazeh Kand-e Yuzbashi Persian: تازه كنديوزباشي
- Village
- Location within Iran
- Country: Iran
- Province: Ardabil
- County: Meshgin Shahr
- District: Qosabeh
- Rural District: Meshgin-e Gharbi

Population (2016)
  - Total: 56
- Time zone: UTC+3:30 (IRST)

Tazeh Kand-e Yuzbashi (Persian: تازه كنديوزباشي) (Note: Also romanized as Tāzeh Kand-e Yūzbāshī; also known as Tāzeh Kand) is a village in Meshgin-e Gharbi Rural District of Qosabeh District in Meshgin Shahr County, Ardabil province, Iran.

== Demographics ==
=== Population ===
At the time of the 2006 National Census, the village's population was 24 in seven households, when it was in the Central District. The following census in 2011 counted 53 people in 13 households. The 2016 census measured the population of the village as 56 people in 19 households, by which time the rural district had been separated from the district in the formation of Qosabeh District.
