= Qinarjeh, Ardabil =

Village in Ardabil province, Iran

Qinarjeh Persian: قينرجه
- Village
- Location within Iran
- Coordinates: 38°19′29″N 47°25′27″E
- Country: Iran
- Province: Ardabil
- County: Meshgin Shahr
- District: Qosabeh
- Rural District: Shaban

Population (2016)
  - Total: 87
- Time zone: UTC+3:30 (IRST)

Qinarjeh (Persian: قينرجه) (Note: Also romanized as Qīnarjeh) is a village in Shaban Rural District of Qosabeh District in Meshgin Shahr County, Ardabil province, Iran.

== Demographics ==
=== Population ===
At the time of the 2006 National Census, the village's population was 192 in 37 households, when it was in the Central District. The following census in 2011 counted 161 people in 36 households. The 2016 census measured the population of the village as 87 people in 25 households, by which time the rural district had been separated from the district in the formation of Qosabeh District.
