= Kalhor, Ardabil =

Village in Ardabil province, Iran

Kalhor Persian: كلهر
- Village
- Location within Iran
- Coordinates: 38°22′10″N 47°29′53″E
- Country: Iran
- Province: Ardabil
- County: Meshgin Shahr
- District: Qosabeh
- Rural District: Shaban

Population (2016)
  - Total: 152
- Time zone: UTC+3:30 (IRST)

Kalhor (Persian: كلهر) (Note: Also known as Kalfīr and Kalhūr) is a village in Shaban Rural District of Qosabeh District in Meshgin Shahr County, Ardabil province, Iran.

== Demographics ==
=== Population ===
At the time of the 2006 National Census, the village's population was 210 in 44 households, when it was in the Central District. The following census in 2011 counted 145 people in 43 households. The 2016 census measured the population of the village as 152 people in 50 households, by which time the rural district had been separated from the district in the formation of Qosabeh District.
