= Sachlu =

Village in Ardabil province, Iran

Sachlu Persian: ساچلو
- Village
- Location within Iran
- Coordinates: 38°20′50″N 47°35′01″E
- Country: Iran
- Province: Ardabil
- County: Meshgin Shahr
- District: Qosabeh
- Rural District: Meshgin-e Gharbi

Population (2016)
  - Total: 0
- Time zone: UTC+3:30 (IRST)

Sachlu (Persian: ساچلو) (Note: Also romanized as Sāchlū) is a village in Meshgin-e Gharbi Rural District of Qosabeh District in Meshgin Shahr County, Ardabil province, Iran.

== Demographics ==
=== Population ===
At the time of the 2006 National Census, the village's population was 83 in 18 households, when it was in the Central District. The following census in 2011 counted 34 people in eight households. The 2016 census measured the population of the village as zero, by which time the rural district had been separated from the district in the formation of Qosabeh District.
