= Yengejeh, Meshgin Shahr =

Village in Ardabil province, Iran

Yengejeh Persian: ینگجه
- Village
- Location within Iran
- Coordinates: 38°22′43″N 47°26′41″E
- Country: Iran
- Province: Ardabil
- County: Meshgin Shahr
- District: Qosabeh
- Rural District: Shaban

Population (2016)
  - Total: 142
- Time zone: UTC+3:30 (IRST)

Yengejeh (Persian: ینگجه) is a village in Shaban Rural District of Qosabeh District in Meshgin Shahr County, Ardabil province, Iran.

== Demographics ==
=== Population ===
At the time of the 2006 National Census, the village's population was 208 in 41 households, when it was in the Central District. The following census in 2011 counted 154 people in 37 households. The 2016 census measured the population of the village as 142 people in 40 households, by which time the rural district had been separated from the district in the formation of Qosabeh District.
