= Asrabad, Ardabil =

Village in Ardabil province, Iran

Coordinates: 32°2′32″N 54°14′26″E

Asrabad Persian: عصراباد
- Village
- Location within Iran
- Country: Iran
- Province: Ardabil
- County: Meshgin Shahr
- District: Qosabeh
- Rural District: Meshgin-e Gharbi

Population (2016)
  - Total: 456
- Time zone: UTC+3:30 (IRST)

Asrabad (Persian: عصراباد) (Note: Also romanized as ʿAṣrābād) is a village in Meshgin-e Gharbi Rural District of Qosabeh District in Meshgin Shahr County, Ardabil province, Iran.

== Demographics ==
=== Population ===
At the time of the 2006 National Census, the village's population was 570 in 121 households, when it was in the Central District. The following census in 2011 counted 544 people in 148 households. The 2016 census measured the population of the village as 456 people in 142 households, by which time the rural district had been separated from the district in the formation of Qosabeh District.
