= Shabanlu, Meshgin Shahr =

Village in Ardabil province, Iran

Shabanlu Persian: شعبانلو
- Village
- Location within Iran
- Coordinates: 38°22′15″N 47°29′05″E
- Country: Iran
- Province: Ardabil
- County: Meshgin Shahr
- District: Qosabeh
- Rural District: Shaban

Population (2016)
  - Total: 205
- Time zone: UTC+3:30 (IRST)

Shabanlu (Persian: شعبانلو) (Note: Also romanized as Shaʿbānlū) is a village in, and the capital of, Shaban Rural District in Qosabeh District of Meshgin Shahr County, Ardabil province, Iran.

== Demographics ==
=== Population ===
At the time of the 2006 National Census, the village's population was 236 in 61 households, when it was in the Central District. The following census in 2011 counted 292 people in 56 households. The 2016 census measured the population of the village as 205 people in 64 households, by which time the rural district had been separated from the district in the formation of Qosabeh District.
