= Ahl-e Iman =

Village in Ardabil province, Iran

Ahl-e Iman Persian: اهل ايمان
- Village
- Location within Iran
- Coordinates: 33°56′6″N 57°12′49″E
- Country: Iran
- Province: Ardabil
- County: Meshgin Shahr
- District: Qosabeh
- Rural District: Shaban

Population (2016)
  - Total: 137
- Time zone: UTC+3:30 (IRST)

Ahl-e Iman (Persian: اهل ايمان) (Note: Also romanized as Ahl-e Īmān) is a village in Shaban Rural District of Qosabeh District in Meshgin Shahr County, Ardabil province, Iran.

== Demographics ==
=== Population ===
At the time of the 2006 National Census, the village's population was 208 in 41 households, when it was in the Central District. The following census in 2011 counted 176 people in 42 households. The 2016 census measured the population of the village as 137 people in 44 households, by which time the rural district had been separated from the district in the formation of Qosabeh District.
