= Savojbolagh =

Savaj Bolagh or Savojbolagh may refer to the following places in Iran:

- Savojbolagh, Ardabil, in Meshgin Shahr County
- Savoj Bolagh, Ardabil County, Ardabil
- Savojbolagh, East Azerbaijan
- Savojbolagh County, in Alborz Province
- Mahabad in West Azerbaijan Province, formerly Savojbolagh
