= Khvorshidabad, Ardabil =

Village in Ardabil province, Iran

Khvorshidabad Persian: خورشيداباد
- Village
- Location within Iran
- Coordinates: 38°20′59″N 47°34′02″E
- Country: Iran
- Province: Ardabil
- County: Meshgin Shahr
- District: Qosabeh
- Rural District: Meshgin-e Gharbi

Population (2016)
  - Total: 306
- Time zone: UTC+3:30 (IRST)

Khvorshidabad (Persian: خورشيداباد) (Note: Also romanized as Khvorshīdābād) is a village in Meshgin-e Gharbi Rural District of Qosabeh District in Meshgin Shahr County, Ardabil province, Iran.

== Demographics ==
=== Population ===
At the time of the 2006 National Census, the village's population was 440 in 88 households, when it was in the Central District. The following census in 2011 counted 371 people in 95 households. The 2016 census measured the population of the village as 306 people in 91 households, by which time the rural district had been separated from the district in the formation of Qosabeh District.
