= Pashalu =

Pashalu may refer to:

- Pashalu, Meshgin-e Sharqi, a village in Meshgin Shahr County, Ardabil province, Iran
- Pashalu, Shaban, a village in Meshgin Shahr County, Ardabil province, Iran
- the former name for Zaritap, Armenia
