= Hiq, Ardabil =

Village in Ardabil province, Iran

Hiq Persian: حيق
- Village
- Location within Iran
- Coordinates: 38°22′58″N 47°34′52″E
- Country: Iran
- Province: Ardabil
- County: Meshgin Shahr
- District: Central
- Rural District: Dasht

Population (2016)
  - Total: 1,188
- Time zone: UTC+3:30 (IRST)

Hiq (Persian: حيق) (Note: Also romanized as Ḩīq) is a village in Dasht Rural District of the Central District in Meshgin Shahr County, Ardabil province, Iran.

== Demographics ==
=== Population ===
At the time of the 2006 National Census, the village's population was 1,237 in 287 households, when it was in Meshgin-e Gharbi Rural District. The following census in 2011 counted 1,219 people in 361 households. The 2016 census measured the population of the village as 1,188 people in 396 households, by which time Hiq had been transferred to Dasht Rural District.
