= Tazeh Kand-e Hajji Khan =

Village in Ardabil province, Iran

Tazeh Kand-e Hajji Khan Persian: تازه كندحاجي خان
- Village
- Location within Iran
- Coordinates: 38°22′28″N 47°26′09″E
- Country: Iran
- Province: Ardabil
- County: Meshgin Shahr
- District: Qosabeh
- Rural District: Shaban

Population (2016)
  - Total: 29
- Time zone: UTC+3:30 (IRST)

Tazeh Kand-e Hajji Khan (Persian: تازه كندحاجي خان) (Note: Also romanized as Tāzeh Kand-e Ḩājjī Khān; also known as Tāzeh Kand) is a village in Shaban Rural District of Qosabeh District in Meshgin Shahr County, Ardabil province, Iran.

== Demographics ==
=== Population ===
At the time of the 2006 National Census, the village's population was 33 in seven households, when it was in the Central District. The following census in 2011 counted 39 people in eight households. The 2016 census measured the population of the village as 29 people in 11 households, by which time the rural district had been separated from the district in the formation of Qosabeh District.
