= Jamalabad, Ardabil =

Village in Ardabil province, Iran

Jamalabad Persian: جمال اباد
- Village
- Location within Iran
- Coordinates: 38°21′52″N 47°32′11″E
- Country: Iran
- Province: Ardabil
- County: Meshgin Shahr
- District: Qosabeh
- Rural District: Meshgin-e Gharbi

Population (2016)
  - Total: 668
- Time zone: UTC+3:30 (IRST)

Jamalabad (Persian: جمال اباد) (Note: Also romanized as Jamālābād) is a village in Meshgin-e Gharbi Rural District of Qosabeh District in Meshgin Shahr County, Ardabil province, Iran.

== Demographics ==
=== Population ===
At the time of the 2006 National Census, the village's population was 776 in 170 households, when it was in the Central District. The following census in 2011 counted 787 people in 207 households. The 2016 census measured the population of the village as 668 people in 195 households, by which time the rural district had been separated from the district in the formation of Qosabeh District.
