= Kazemabad, Ardabil =

Village in Ardabil province, Iran

Kazemabad Persian: كاظم اباد
- Village
- Location within Iran
- Coordinates: 38°19′07″N 47°26′23″E
- Country: Iran
- Province: Ardabil
- County: Meshgin Shahr
- District: Qosabeh
- Rural District: Shaban

Population (2016)
  - Total: 101
- Time zone: UTC+3:30 (IRST)

Kazemabad (Persian: كاظم اباد) (Note: Also romanized as Kāz̧emābād) is a village in Shaban Rural District of Qosabeh District in Meshgin Shahr County, Ardabil province, Iran.

== Demographics ==
=== Population ===
At the time of the 2006 National Census, the village's population was 199 in 41 households, when it was in the Central District. The following census in 2011 counted 144 people in 38 households. The 2016 census measured the population of the village as 101 people in 30 households, by which time the rural district had been separated from the district in the formation of Qosabeh District.
