= Ahmadabad, Meshgin Shahr =

Village in Ardabil province, Iran

Ahmadabad Persian: احمداباد
- Village
- Location within Iran
- Coordinates: 38°22′05″N 47°35′13″E
- Country: Iran
- Province: Ardabil
- County: Meshgin Shahr
- District: Central
- Rural District: Dasht

Population (2016)
  - Total: 1,476
- Time zone: UTC+3:30 (IRST)

Ahmadabad (Persian: احمداباد) (Note: Also romanized as Aḩmadābād) is a village in Dasht Rural District of the Central District in Meshgin Shahr County, Ardabil province, Iran.

== Demographics ==
=== Population ===
At the time of the 2006 National Census, the village's population was 1,970 in 392 households, when it was in Meshgin-e Gharbi Rural District. The following census in 2011 counted 1,899 people in 465 households. The 2016 census measured the population of the village as 1,476 people in 474 households, by which time Ahmadabad had been transferred to Dasht Rural District.
