= Qerkh Bolagh, Meshgin Shahr =

Village in Ardabil province, Iran

Qerkh Bolagh Persian: قرخ بلاغ
- Village
- Location within Iran
- Coordinates: 38°18′31″N 47°37′39″E
- Country: Iran
- Province: Ardabil
- County: Meshgin Shahr
- District: Central
- Rural District: Dasht

Population (2016)
  - Total: 20
- Time zone: UTC+3:30 (IRST)

Qerkh Bolagh (Persian: قرخ بلاغ) (Note: Also romanized as Qerkh Bolāgh) is a village in Dasht Rural District of the Central District in Meshgin Shahr County, Ardabil province, Iran.

== Demographics ==
=== Population ===
At the time of the 2006 National Census, the village's population was 42 in 10 households, when it was in Meshgin-e Gharbi Rural District. The following census in 2011 counted 36 people in nine households. The 2016 census measured the population of the village as 20 people in six households, by which time Qerkh Bolagh had been transferred to Dasht Rural District.
