= Kalanpa =

Village in Ardabil province, Iran

Kalanpa Persian: كلانپا
- Village
- Location within Iran
- Coordinates: 38°20′45″N 47°28′33″E
- Country: Iran
- Province: Ardabil
- County: Meshgin Shahr
- District: Qosabeh
- Rural District: Shaban

Population (2016)
  - Total: 99
- Time zone: UTC+3:30 (IRST)

Kalanpa (Persian: كلانپا) (Note: Also romanized as Kalānpā; also known as Kalampā) is a village in Shaban Rural District of Qosabeh District in Meshgin Shahr County, Ardabil province, Iran.

== Demographics ==
=== Population ===
At the time of the 2006 National Census, the village's population was 141 in 29 households, when it was in the Central District. The following census in 2011 counted 140 people in 40 households. The 2016 census measured the population of the village as 99 people in 31 households, by which time the rural district had been separated from the district in the formation of Qosabeh District.
