= Balluqiyeh, Iran =

Village in Ardabil province, Iran

Balluqiyeh Persian: باللوقيه
- Village
- Location within Iran
- Country: Iran
- Province: Ardabil
- County: Meshgin Shahr
- District: Qosabeh
- Rural District: Meshgin-e Gharbi

Population (2016)
  - Total: 100
- Time zone: UTC+3:30 (IRST)

Balluqiyeh (Persian: باللوقيه) (Note: Also romanized as Bāllūqīyeh; also known as Antarballī, Balu Qayah, Bālū Qayah, and Gagīvard) is a village in Meshgin-e Gharbi Rural District of Qosabeh District in Meshgin Shahr County, Ardabil province, Iran.

== Demographics ==
=== Population ===
At the time of the 2006 National Census, the village's population was 133 in 25 households, when it was in the Central District. The following census in 2011 counted 127 people in 32 households. The 2016 census measured the population of the village as 100 people in 37 households, by which time the rural district had been separated from the district in the formation of Qosabeh District.
