= Karkasheh =

Village in Ardabil province, Iran

Karkasheh Persian: كركشه
- Village
- Location within Iran
- Coordinates: 38°20′20″N 47°24′27″E
- Country: Iran
- Province: Ardabil
- County: Meshgin Shahr
- District: Qosabeh
- Rural District: Shaban

Population (2016)
  - Total: 85
- Time zone: UTC+3:30 (IRST)

Karkasheh (Persian: كركشه) (Note: Also romanized as Gargasheh) is a village in Shaban Rural District of Qosabeh District in Meshgin Shahr County, Ardabil province, Iran.

== Demographics ==
=== Population ===
At the time of the 2006 National Census, the village's population was 66 in 14 households, when it was in the Central District. The following census in 2011 counted 45 people in 14 households. The 2016 census measured the population of the village as 85 people in 30 households, by which time the rural district had been separated from the district in the formation of Qosabeh District.
