= Shamsabad, Meshgin Shahr =

Village in Ardabil province, Iran

Shamsabad Persian: شمس اباد
- Village
- Location within Iran
- Coordinates: 38°21′21″N 47°25′53″E
- Country: Iran
- Province: Ardabil
- County: Meshgin Shahr
- District: Qosabeh
- Rural District: Shaban

Population (2016)
  - Total: 19
- Time zone: UTC+3:30 (IRST)

Shamsabad (Persian: شمس اباد) (Note: Also romanized as Shamsābād) is a village in Shaban Rural District of Qosabeh District in Meshgin Shahr County, Ardabil province, Iran.

== Demographics ==
=== Population ===
At the time of the 2006 National Census, the village's population was 64 in 16 households, when it was in the Central District. The following census in 2011 counted 32 people in 11 households. The 2016 census measured the population of the village as 19 people in seven households, by which time the rural district had been separated from the district in the formation of Qosabeh District.
