= Sheykhlar, Ardabil =

Village in Ardabil province, Iran

Sheykhlar Persian: شيخلار
- Village
- Location within Iran
- Country: Iran
- Province: Ardabil
- County: Meshgin Shahr
- District: Qosabeh
- Rural District: Shaban

Population (2016)
  - Total: 176
- Time zone: UTC+3:30 (IRST)

Sheykhlar (Persian: شيخلار) (Note: Also romanized as Sheykhlār) is a village in Shaban Rural District of Qosabeh District in Meshgin Shahr County, Ardabil province, Iran.

== Demographics ==
=== Population ===
At the time of the 2006 National Census, the village's population was 139 in 31 households, when it was in the Central District. The following census in 2011 counted 112 people in 28 households. The 2016 census measured the population of the village as 176 people in 70 households, by which time the rural district had been separated from the district in the formation of Qosabeh District.
