= Aq Divar =

Aq Divar (Persian: اق ديوار) may refer to:

- Aq Divar, Ardabil
- Aq Divar, East Azerbaijan
