= Niaz Sui =

Village in Ardabil province, Iran

Niaz Sui Persian: نيازسويي
- Village
- Location within Iran
- Coordinates: 38°23′50″N 47°24′19″E
- Country: Iran
- Province: Ardabil
- County: Meshgin Shahr
- District: Qosabeh
- Rural District: Shaban

Population (2016)
  - Total: 77
- Time zone: UTC+3:30 (IRST)

Niaz Sui (Persian: نيازسويي) (Note: Also romanized as Nīāz Sū’ī) is a village in Shaban Rural District of Qosabeh District in Meshgin Shahr County, Ardabil province, Iran.

== Demographics ==
=== Population ===
At the time of the 2006 National Census, the village's population was 115 in 26 households, when it was in the Central District. The following census in 2011 counted 90 people in 20 households. The 2016 census measured the population of the village as 77 people in 25 households, by which time the rural district had been separated from the district in the formation of Qosabeh District.
