= Atashgah-e Jadid =

Village in Ardabil province, Iran

Atashgah-e Jadid Persian: اتشگاه جديد
- Village
- Location within Iran
- Coordinates: 38°21′58″N 47°28′30″E
- Country: Iran
- Province: Ardabil
- County: Meshgin Shahr
- District: Qosabeh
- Rural District: Shaban

Population (2016)
  - Total: 134
- Time zone: UTC+3:30 (IRST)

Atashgah-e Jadid (Persian: اتشگاه جديد) (Note: Also romanized as Atashgāh-e Jadīd) is a village in Shaban Rural District of Qosabeh District in Meshgin Shahr County, Ardabil province, Iran.

== Demographics ==
=== Population ===
At the time of the 2006 National Census, the village's population was 185 in 41 households, when it was in the Central District. The following census in 2011 counted 146 people in 35 households. The 2016 census measured the population of the village as 134 people in 41 households, by which time the rural district had been separated from the district in the formation of Qosabeh District.
