= Salman Kandi, Ardabil =

Village in Ardabil province, Iran

Salman Kandi Persian: سلمان‌کندی
- Village
- Location within Iran
- Coordinates: 38°22′01″N 47°27′34″E
- Country: Iran
- Province: Ardabil
- County: Meshgin Shahr
- District: Qosabeh
- Rural District: Shaban

Population (2016)
  - Total: 409
- Time zone: UTC+3:30 (IRST)

Salman Kandi (Persian: سلمان‌کندی) (Note: Also romanized as Salmān Kandī) is a village in Shaban Rural District of Qosabeh District in Meshgin Shahr County, Ardabil province, Iran.

== Demographics ==
=== Population ===
At the time of the 2006 National Census, the village's population was 552 in 118 households, when it was in the Central District. The following census in 2011 counted 424 people in 120 households. The 2016 census measured the population of the village as 409 people in 133 households, by which time the rural district had been separated from the district in the formation of Qosabeh District. It was the most populous village in its rural district.
