= Aluch =

Village in Ardabil province, Iran

Aluch Persian: الوچ
- Village
- Location within Iran
- Coordinates: 38°21′50″N 47°34′28″E
- Country: Iran
- Province: Ardabil
- County: Meshgin Shahr
- District: Central
- Rural District: Dasht

Population (2016)
  - Total: 503
- Time zone: UTC+3:30 (IRST)

Aluch (Persian: الوچ) (Note: Also romanized as Ālūch; also known as Ālūj) is a village in Dasht Rural District of the Central District in Meshgin Shahr County, Ardabil province, Iran.

== Demographics ==
=== Population ===
At the time of the 2006 National Census, the village's population was 469 in 102 households, when it was in Meshgin-e Gharbi Rural District. The following census in 2011 counted 390 people in 101 households. The 2016 census measured the population of the village as 503 people in 143 households, by which time Aluch had been transferred to Dasht Rural District.
