= Andazaq =

Village in Ardabil province, Iran

Andazaq Persian: اندزق
- Village
- Location within Iran
- Coordinates: 38°20′31″N 47°36′37″E
- Country: Iran
- Province: Ardabil
- County: Meshgin Shahr
- District: Central
- Rural District: Dasht

Population (2016)
  - Total: 409
- Time zone: UTC+3:30 (IRST)

Andazaq (Persian: اندزق) is a village in Dasht Rural District of the Central District in Meshgin Shahr County, Ardabil province, Iran.

== Demographics ==
=== Population ===
At the time of the 2006 National Census, the village's population was 642 in 131 households, when it was in Meshgin-e Gharbi Rural District. The following census in 2011 counted 543 people in 133 households. The 2016 census measured the population of the village as 409 people in 125 households, by which time Andazaq had been transferred to Dasht Rural District.
