= Aqchehlu =

Village in Ardabil province, Iran

Aqchehlu Persian: اقچه لو
- Village
- Location within Iran
- Coordinates: 38°20′56″N 47°26′13″E
- Country: Iran
- Province: Ardabil
- County: Meshgin Shahr
- District: Qosabeh
- Rural District: Shaban

Population (2016)
  - Total: 127
- Time zone: UTC+3:30 (IRST)

Aqchehlu (Persian: اقچه لو) (Note: Also romanized as Āqchehlū; also known as Āq Jālū and Aqjehlū) is a village in Shaban Rural District of Qosabeh District in Meshgin Shahr County, Ardabil province, Iran.

== Demographics ==
=== Population ===
At the time of the 2006 National Census, the village's population was 262 in 52 households, when it was in the Central District. The following census in 2011 counted 200 people in 49 households. The 2016 census measured the population of the village as 127 people in 43 households, by which time the rural district had been separated from the district in the formation of Qosabeh District.
