= Gellar-e Mohammad Hasan =

Village in Ardabil province, Iran

Gellar-e Mohammad Hasan Persian: گللرمحمدحسن
- Village
- Country: Iran
- Province: Ardabil
- County: Meshgin Shahr
- District: Qosabeh
- Rural District: Meshgin-e Gharbi

Population (2016)
  - Total: 324
- Time zone: UTC+3:30 (IRST)

Gellar-e Mohammad Hasan (Persian: گللرمحمدحسن) (Note: Also romanized as Gellar-e Moḩammad Ḩasan) is a village in Meshgin-e Gharbi Rural District of Qosabeh District in Meshgin Shahr County, Ardabil province, Iran.

== Demographics ==
=== Population ===
At the time of the 2006 National Census, the village's population was 320 in 70 households, when it was in the Central District. The following census in 2011 counted 318 people in 88 households. The 2016 census measured the population of the village as 324 people in 97 households, by which time the rural district had been separated from the district in the formation of Qosabeh District.
