= Khankandi, Meshgin Shahr =

Village in Ardabil province, Iran

Khankandi Persian: خان كندي
- Village
- Location within Iran
- Coordinates: 38°27′38″N 47°28′11″E
- Country: Iran
- Province: Ardabil
- County: Meshgin Shahr
- District: Qosabeh
- Rural District: Shaban

Population (2016)
  - Total: 126
- Time zone: UTC+3:30 (IRST)

Khankandi (Persian: خان كندي) (Note: Also romanized as Khānkandī) is a village in Shaban Rural District of Qosabeh District in Meshgin Shahr County, Ardabil province, Iran.

== Demographics ==
=== Population ===
At the time of the 2006 National Census, the village's population was 202 in 49 households, when it was in the Central District. The following census in 2011 counted 157 people in 52 households. The 2016 census measured the population of the village as 126 people in 53 households, by which time the rural district had been separated from the district in the formation of Qosabeh District.
