= Zir Zamin =

Village in Ardabil province, Iran

Zir Zamin Persian: زيرزمين
- Village
- Location within Iran
- Coordinates: 38°24′55″N 47°35′20″E
- Country: Iran
- Province: Ardabil
- County: Meshgin Shahr
- District: Central
- Rural District: Dasht

Population (2016)
  - Total: 289
- Time zone: UTC+3:30 (IRST)

Zir Zamin (Persian: زيرزمين) (Note: Also romanized as Zīr Zamīn) is a village in Dasht Rural District of the Central District in Meshgin Shahr County, Ardabil province, Iran.

== Demographics ==
=== Population ===
At the time of the 2006 National Census, the village's population was 425 in 92 households, when it was in Meshgin-e Gharbi Rural District. The following census in 2011 counted 343 people in 99 households. The 2016 census measured the population of the village as 289 people in 100 households, by which time Zir Zamin had been transferred to Dasht Rural District.
