= Qarah Baghlar =

Village in Ardabil province, Iran

Qarah Baghlar Persian: قره باغلار
- Village
- Location within Iran
- Coordinates: 38°27′32″N 47°35′27″E
- Country: Iran
- Province: Ardabil
- County: Meshgin Shahr
- District: Central
- Rural District: Dasht

Population (2016)
  - Total: 353
- Time zone: UTC+3:30 (IRST)

Qarah Baghlar (Persian: قره باغلار) (Note: Also romanized as Qarah Bāghlār, Qarah Bāghlar, and Qareh Bāghlār) is a village in Dasht Rural District of the Central District in Meshgin Shahr County, Ardabil province, Iran.

== Demographics ==
=== Population ===
At the time of the 2006 National Census, the village's population was 454 in 102 households. The following census in 2011 counted 359 people in 95 households. The 2016 census measured the population of the village as 353 people in 127 households.
