= Anzan =

Anzan may refer to:

- Anshan (Persia)
- a part of masjedsoleyman and izeh, some city's in Iran
- Anzan, Ardabil, a village in Iran
- Anzan, Golestan, old name of an area in west part of Golestan province in North of Iran
- Mental abacus; 暗算, Japanese mental calculation way by imagination of soroban (算盤)
- A type of Japanese amulet, called omamori, used by pregnant women
- Ançã (Cantanhede), a Portuguese civil parish
