= Ebrahim Kandi, Meshgin Shahr =

Village in Ardabil province, Iran

Ebrahim Kandi Persian: ابراهيم كندي
- Village
- Location within Iran
- Coordinates: 38°26′23″N 47°41′19″E
- Country: Iran
- Province: Ardabil
- County: Meshgin Shahr
- District: Central
- Rural District: Meshgin-e Sharqi

Population (2016)
  - Total: 257
- Time zone: UTC+3:30 (IRST)

Ebrahim Kandi (Persian: ابراهيم كندي) (Note: Also romanized as Ebrāhīm Kandī; also known as Varāghūl (وراغول) and Vārghūl (ورغول)) is a village in Meshgin-e Sharqi Rural District of the Central District in Meshgin Shahr County, Ardabil province, Iran.

== Demographics ==
=== Population ===
At the time of the 2006 National Census, the village's population was 272 in 61 households. The following census in 2011 counted 282 people in 75 households. The 2016 census measured the population of the village as 257 people in 80 households.
