= Sati-ye Vosta =

Village in Ardabil province, Iran

Sati-ye Vosta Persian: ساطي وسطي
- Village
- Location within Iran
- Country: Iran
- Province: Ardabil
- County: Meshgin Shahr
- District: Qosabeh
- Rural District: Shaban

Population (2016)
  - Total: 30
- Time zone: UTC+3:30 (IRST)

Sati-ye Vosta (Persian: ساطي وسطي) (Note: Also romanized as Sāţī-ye Vostá) is a village in Shaban Rural District of Qosabeh District in Meshgin Shahr County, Ardabil province, Iran.

== Demographics ==
=== Population ===
At the time of the 2006 National Census, the village's population was 55 in nine households, when it was in the Central District. The following census in 2011 counted 47 people in 11 households. The 2016 census measured the population of the village as 30 people in 10 households, by which time the rural district had been separated from the district in the formation of Qosabeh District.
