= Sarikhanlu =

Village in Ardabil province, Iran

Sarikhanlu Persian: ساري خانلو
- Village
- Location within Iran
- Coordinates: 38°31′06″N 47°30′55″E
- Country: Iran
- Province: Ardabil
- County: Meshgin Shahr
- District: Central
- Rural District: Dasht

Population (2016)
  - Total: 375
- Time zone: UTC+3:30 (IRST)

Sarikhanlu (Persian: ساري خانلو) (Note: Also romanized as Sārīkhānlū) is a village in Dasht Rural District of the Central District in Meshgin Shahr County, Ardabil province, Iran.

== Demographics ==
=== Population ===
At the time of the 2006 National Census, the village's population was 492 in 108 households. The following census in 2011 counted 456 people in 122 households. The 2016 census measured the population of the village as 375 people in 108 households.
