= Sati-ye Olya =

Village in Ardabil province, Iran

Sati-ye Olya Persian: ساطي عليا
- Village
- Location within Iran
- Coordinates: 38°21′59″N 47°24′31″E
- Country: Iran
- Province: Ardabil
- County: Meshgin Shahr
- District: Qosabeh
- Rural District: Shaban

Population (2016)
  - Total: 40
- Time zone: UTC+3:30 (IRST)

Sati-ye Olya (Persian: ساطي عليا) (Note: Also romanized as Sāţī-ye ‘Olyā; also known as Sāţī-ye Bālā) is a village in Shaban Rural District of Qosabeh District in Meshgin Shahr County, Ardabil province, Iran.

== Demographics ==
=== Population ===
At the time of the 2006 National Census, the village's population was 183 in 39 households, when it was in the Central District. The following census in 2011 counted 110 people in 27 households. The 2016 census measured the population of the village as 40 people in 16 households, by which time the rural district had been separated from the district in the formation of Qosabeh District.
