= Savojbolagh, East Azerbaijan =

Savojbolagh ساوجبلاغ
- Village
- Location within Iran
- Coordinates: 37°35′34″N 47°58′42″E
- Country: Iran
- Province: East Azerbaijan
- County: Meyaneh
- Bakhsh: Central
- Rural District: Garmeh-ye Jonubi

Population (2006)
  - Total: 37
- Time zone: UTC+3:30 (IRST)
  - Summer (DST): UTC+4:30 (IRDT)

Savojbolagh (Persian: ساوجبلاغ, also Romanized as Sāvojbolāgh) is a village in Garmeh-ye Jonubi Rural District, in the Central District of Meyaneh County, East Azerbaijan Province, Iran. At the 2006 census, its population was 37, in 10 families.

Another town called Savojbolagh is in Shaban Rural District. The similarly-named Savoj Bolagh is in Arshaq-e Sharqi Rural District.
