= Tak Dam, Meshgin Shahr =

Village in Ardabil province, Iran

Tak Dam Persian: تك دام
- Village
- Location within Iran
- Coordinates: 38°27′42″N 47°46′25″E
- Country: Iran
- Province: Ardabil
- County: Meshgin Shahr
- District: Central
- Rural District: Meshgin-e Sharqi

Population (2016)
  - Total: 293
- Time zone: UTC+3:30 (IRST)

Tak Dam (Persian: تك دام) (Note: Also romanized as Tak Dām; also known as Jahādābād) is a village in Meshgin-e Sharqi Rural District of the Central District in Meshgin Shahr County, Ardabil province, Iran.

== Demographics ==
=== Population ===
At the time of the 2006 National Census, the village's population was 304 in 80 households. The following census in 2011 counted 320 people in 84 households. The 2016 census measured the population of the village as 293 people in 86 households.
