= Kujanaq =

Village in Ardabil province, Iran

Kujanaq Persian: كوجنق
- Village
- Location within Iran
- Coordinates: 38°29′24″N 47°30′27″E
- Country: Iran
- Province: Ardabil
- County: Meshgin Shahr
- District: Central
- Rural District: Dasht

Population (2016)
  - Total: 1,920
- Time zone: UTC+3:30 (IRST)

Kujanaq (Persian: كوجنق) (Note: Also romanized as Kūjanaq and Kūjnaq; also known as Koojanagh) is a village in Dasht Rural District of the Central District in Meshgin Shahr County, Ardabil province, Iran.

== Demographics ==
=== Population ===
At the time of the 2006 National Census, the village's population was 2,487 in 514 households. The following census in 2011 counted 2,457 people in 681 households. The 2016 census measured the population of the village as 1,920 people in 151 households.
