= Jafarabad, Meshgin Shahr =

Village in Ardabil province, Iran

Jafarabad Persian: جعفرآباد
- Village
- Location within Iran
- Coordinates: 38°24′11″N 47°45′53″E
- Country: Iran
- Province: Ardabil
- County: Meshgin Shahr
- District: Central
- Rural District: Meshgin-e Sharqi

Population (2016)
  - Total: 140
- Time zone: UTC+3:30 (IRST)

Jafarabad (Persian: جعفرآباد) (Note: Also romanized as Ja‘farābād) is a village in Meshgin-e Sharqi Rural District of the Central District in Meshgin Shahr County, Ardabil province, Iran.

== Demographics ==
=== Population ===
At the time of the 2006 National Census, the village's population was 273 in 52 households. The following census in 2011 counted 201 people in 49 households. The 2016 census measured the population of the village as 140 people in 47 households.
