= Aq Divar, Ardabil =

Village in Ardabil province, Iran

Aq Divar Persian: اق ديوار
- Village
- Location within Iran
- Country: Iran
- Province: Ardabil
- County: Meshgin Shahr
- District: Qosabeh
- Rural District: Shaban

Population (2016)
  - Total: 32
- Time zone: UTC+3:30 (IRST)

Aq Divar (Persian: اق ديوار) (Note: Also romanized as Āq Dīvār; also known as Āghdīvār) is a village in Shaban Rural District of Qosabeh District in Meshgin Shahr County, Ardabil province, Iran.

== Demographics ==
=== Population ===
At the time of the 2006 National Census, the village's population was 35 in eight households, when it was in the Central District. The following census in 2011 counted 32 people in nine households. The 2016 census measured the population of the village as 32 people in ten households, by which time the rural district had been separated from the district in the formation of Qosabeh District.
