= Ballujeh Mirak =

Village in Ardabil province, Iran

Ballujeh Mirak Persian: باللوجه ميرك
- Village
- Location within Iran
- Coordinates: 38°22′28″N 47°43′28″E
- Country: Iran
- Province: Ardabil
- County: Meshgin Shahr
- District: Central
- Rural District: Meshgin-e Sharqi

Population (2016)
  - Total: 1,598
- Time zone: UTC+3:30 (IRST)

Ballujeh Mirak (Persian: باللوجه ميرك) (Note: Also romanized as Bāllūjeh Mīrak; also known as Bāllūjeh and Būlūjeh) is a village in Meshgin-e Sharqi Rural District of the Central District in Meshgin Shahr County, Ardabil province, Iran.

== Demographics ==
=== Population ===
At the time of the 2006 National Census, the village's population was 1,723 in 378 households. The following census in 2011 counted 1,628 people in 456 households. The 2016 census measured the population of the village as 1,598 people in 498 households.
