= Dastgir, Iran =

Village in Ardabil province, Iran

Dastgir Persian: دستگير
- Village
- Location within Iran
- Coordinates: 38°28′00″N 47°40′08″E
- Country: Iran
- Province: Ardabil
- County: Meshgin Shahr
- District: Central
- Rural District: Dasht

Population (2016)
  - Total: 185
- Time zone: UTC+3:30 (IRST)

Dastgir (Persian: دستگير) (Note: Also romanized as Dastgīr) is a village in Dasht Rural District of the Central District in Meshgin Shahr County, Ardabil province, Iran.

== Demographics ==
=== Population ===
At the time of the 2006 National Census, the village's population was 237 in 57 households. The following census in 2011 counted 208 people in 56 households. The 2016 census measured the population of the village as 185 people in 55 households.
