= Nasirabad, Meshgin Shahr =

Village in Ardabil province, Iran

Nasirabad Persian: نصيراباد
- Village
- Location within Iran
- Coordinates: 38°25′48″N 47°39′51″E
- Country: Iran
- Province: Ardabil
- County: Meshgin Shahr
- District: Central
- Rural District: Dasht

Population (2016)
  - Total: 1,195
- Time zone: UTC+3:30 (IRST)

Nasirabad (Persian: نصيراباد) (Note: Also romanized as Naşīrābād) is a village in Dasht Rural District of the Central District in Meshgin Shahr County, Ardabil province, Iran.

== Demographics ==
=== Population ===
At the time of the 2006 National Census, the village's population was 1,286 in 331 households. The following census in 2011 counted 1,298 people in 409 households. The 2016 census measured the population of the village as 1,195 people in 454 households.
