= Pashalu, Shaban =

Village in Ardabil province, Iran

Pashalu Persian: پاشالو
- Village
- Location within Iran
- Country: Iran
- Province: Ardabil
- County: Meshgin Shahr
- District: Qosabeh
- Rural District: Shaban

Population (2016)
  - Total: 23
- Time zone: UTC+3:30 (IRST)

Pashalu (Persian: پاشالو) (Note: Also romanized as Pāshālū) is a village in Shaban Rural District of Qosabeh District in Meshgin Shahr County, Ardabil province, Iran.

== Demographics ==
=== Population ===
At the time of the 2006 National Census, the village's population was 46 in eight households, when it was in the Central District. The following census in 2011 counted 38 people in 10 households. The 2016 census measured the population of the village as 23 people in eight households, by which time the rural district had been separated from the district in the formation of Qosabeh District.
