= Seyyed Kandi, Meshgin Shahr =

Village in Ardabil province, Iran

Seyyed Kandi Persian: سيدكندي
- Village
- Country: Iran
- Province: Ardabil
- County: Meshgin Shahr
- District: Qosabeh
- Rural District: Meshgin-e Gharbi

Population (2016)
  - Total: 75
- Time zone: UTC+3:30 (IRST)

Seyyed Kandi (Persian: سيدكندي) (Note: Also romanized as Seyyed Kandī) is a village in Meshgin-e Gharbi Rural District of Qosabeh District in Meshgin Shahr County, Ardabil province, Iran.

== Demographics ==
=== Population ===
At the time of the 2006 National Census, the village's population was 63 in 11 households, when it was in the Central District. The following census in 2011 counted 17 people in four households. The 2016 census measured the population of the village as 75 people in 25 households, by which time the rural district had been separated from the district in the formation of Qosabeh District.
