= Bijaq =

Village in Ardabil province, Iran

Bijaq Persian: بيجق
- Village
- Location within Iran
- Coordinates: 38°28′43″N 47°42′15″E
- Country: Iran
- Province: Ardabil
- County: Meshgin Shahr
- District: Central
- Rural District: Meshgin-e Sharqi

Population (2016)
  - Total: 928
- Time zone: UTC+3:30 (IRST)

Bijaq (Persian: بيجق) (Note: Also romanized as Bījaq) is a village in Meshgin-e Sharqi Rural District of the Central District in Meshgin Shahr County, Ardabil province, Iran.

== Demographics ==
=== Population ===
At the time of the 2006 National Census, the village's population was 911 in 227 households. The following census in 2011 counted 998 people in 264 households. The 2016 census measured the population of the village as 928 people in 263 households.
