= Hajjilu =

Village in Ardabil province, Iran

Hajjilu Persian: حاجيلو
- Village
- Location within Iran
- Coordinates: 38°31′16″N 47°39′13″E
- Country: Iran
- Province: Ardabil
- County: Meshgin Shahr
- District: Central
- Rural District: Meshgin-e Sharqi

Population (2016)
  - Total: 242
- Time zone: UTC+3:30 (IRST)

Hajjilu (Persian: حاجيلو) (Note: Also romanized as Ḩājjīlū; also known as Chājīlū, Jajehloo, Jājīlū, Khojeli, Khvājeh ‘Alī, and Khvojehlī) is a village in Meshgin-e Sharqi Rural District of the Central District in Meshgin Shahr County, Ardabil province, Iran.

== Demographics ==
=== Population ===
At the time of the 2006 National Census, the village's population was 230 in 52 households. The following census in 2011 counted 258 people in 69 households. The 2016 census measured the population of the village as 242 people in 75 households.
