= Baris, Iran =

Village in Ardabil province, Iran

Baris Persian: باريس
- Village
- Location within Iran
- Coordinates: 38°30′34″N 47°40′16″E
- Country: Iran
- Province: Ardabil
- County: Meshgin Shahr
- District: Central
- Rural District: Meshgin-e Sharqi

Population (2016)
  - Total: 93
- Time zone: UTC+3:30 (IRST)

Baris (Persian: باريس) (Note: Also romanized as Bārīs) is a village in Meshgin-e Sharqi Rural District of the Central District in Meshgin Shahr County, Ardabil province, Iran.

== Demographics ==
=== Population ===
At the time of the 2006 National Census, the village's population was 131 in 33 households. The following census in 2011 counted 74 people in 25 households. The 2016 census measured the population of the village as 93 people in 29 households.
