= Movil =

Village in Ardabil province, Iran

Movil Persian: مويل
- Village
- Location within Iran
- Coordinates: 38°17′50″N 47°42′57″E
- Country: Iran
- Province: Ardabil
- County: Meshgin Shahr
- District: Central
- Rural District: Dasht

Population (2016)
  - Total: 1,658
- Time zone: UTC+3:30 (IRST)

Movil (Persian: مويل) (Note: Also romanized as Movīl and Mū’īl; also known as Mūbel and Mūl) is a village in Dasht Rural District of the Central District in Meshgin Shahr County, Ardabil province, Iran.

== Demographics ==
=== Population ===
At the time of the 2006 National Census, the village's population was 1,400 in 302 households. The following census in 2011 counted 1,532 people in 422 households. The 2016 census measured the population of the village as 1,658 people in 491 households.

== Etymology ==
According to Vladimir Minorsky, the name "Movil" is derived from the Mongolian word moyl, referring to the bird cherry (Prunus padus).
