= Khorramabad, Ardabil =

Village in Ardabil province, Iran

Khorramabad Persian: خرم اباد
- Village
- Location within Iran
- Coordinates: 38°24′42″N 47°37′03″E
- Country: Iran
- Province: Ardabil
- County: Meshgin Shahr
- District: Central
- Rural District: Dasht

Population (2016)
  - Total: 448
- Time zone: UTC+3:30 (IRST)

Khorramabad (Persian: خرم اباد) (Note: Also romanized as Khorramābād) is a village in Dasht Rural District of the Central District in Meshgin Shahr County, Ardabil province, Iran.

== Demographics ==
=== Population ===
At the time of the 2006 National Census, the village's population was 681 in 135 households. The following census in 2011 counted 653 people in 173 households. The 2016 census measured the population of the village as 448 people in 162 households.
