= Gonduz =

Gonduz or Ganduz or Gondooz (Persian: گندوز) may refer to:

- Ganduz, Ardabil, Iran
- Gonduz, Hamadan, Iran

== See also ==
- Kunduz, a city in Afghanistan
