= Sarti =

Sarti can be referring to the following items:

== Surname ==
The Italian language surname Sarti is derived from the occupation of tailor. Notable people with the surname include:

- Adolfo Sarti (1928–1992), Italian Christian Democrat politician
- Alessandra Sarti (born 1974), Italian mathematician
- Alessio Sarti (born 1979), Italian football (soccer) goalkeeper
- Antun Sarti, Dalmatian politician, was Mayor of Split
- Benito Sarti (1936–2020), retired Italian professional football player
- Ercole Sarti (1593–?), Italian painter of the Baroque period, active in Ferrara
- Giuliano Sarti (1933–2017), former Italian footballer
- Giuseppe Sarti (1729–1802), Italian opera composer
- Leo Sarti (born 1956), Sammarinese judoka
- Lucien Sarti (c. 1931 – 1972), drug trafficker and killer-for-hire involved in the infamous French Connection heroin network
- Paolo Sarti, Italian painter
- Prospero Sarti (died 1904), Italian engineer, architect, engraver, and collector of antiquities, including a numismatist of ancient Roman coins
- Taddeo Sarti (1540–1617), Roman Catholic prelate, Bishop of Nepi and Sutri
- Vagner da Silva Sarti (born 1978), former Brazilian football player

== Places ==
- Sarti, Chalkidiki, a village in Greece
- Sarti, Punjab, a village in India

== See also ==
- Sarti surface, surface with 600 nodes, found by Alessandra Sarti 2008
- Sarati
- Sart
- Sati (disambiguation)
