= Qeshlaq-e Tang =

Village in Ardabil province, Iran

Qeshlaq-e Tang Persian: قشلاق تنگ
- Village
- Location within Iran
- Coordinates: 38°32′22″N 47°40′11″E
- Country: Iran
- Province: Ardabil
- County: Meshgin Shahr
- District: Central
- Rural District: Meshgin-e Sharqi

Population (2016)
  - Total: 32
- Time zone: UTC+3:30 (IRST)

Qeshlaq-e Tang (Persian: قشلاق تنگ) (Note: Also romanized as Qeshlāq-e Tang) is a village in Meshgin-e Sharqi Rural District of the Central District in Meshgin Shahr County, Ardabil province, Iran.

== Demographics ==
=== Population ===
At the time of the 2006 National Census, the village's population was 45 in 14 households. The following census in 2011 counted 36 people in nine households. The 2016 census measured the population of the village as 32 people in 13 households.
