= Anzan, Ardabil =

Village in Ardabil province, Iran

Anzan Persian: انزان
- Village
- Location within Iran
- Coordinates: 38°18′27″N 47°27′25″E
- Country: Iran
- Province: Ardabil
- County: Meshgin Shahr
- District: Qosabeh
- Rural District: Shaban

Population (2016)
  - Total: 218
- Time zone: UTC+3:30 (IRST)

Anzan (Persian: انزان) (Note: Also romanized as Anzān) is a village in Shaban Rural District of Qosabeh District in Meshgin Shahr County, Ardabil province, Iran.

== Demographics ==
=== Population ===
At the time of the 2006 National Census, the village's population was 506 in 113 households, when it was in the Central District. The following census in 2011 counted 279 people in 71 households. The 2016 census measured the population of the village as 218 people in 65 households, by which time the rural district had been separated from the district in the formation of Qosabeh District.
