= Dust Beyglu =

Village in Ardabil province, Iran

Dust Beyglu Persian: دوستبيگلو
- Village
- Location within Iran
- Coordinates: 38°32′49″N 47°32′09″E
- Country: Iran
- Province: Ardabil
- County: Meshgin Shahr
- District: Central
- Rural District: Dasht

Population (2016)
  - Total: 681
- Time zone: UTC+3:30 (IRST)

Dust Beyglu (Persian: دوستبيگلو) (Note: Also romanized as Dūst Beyglū; also known as Dust‘ali Beyglū) is a village in Dasht Rural District of the Central District in Meshgin Shahr County, Ardabil province, Iran.

== Demographics ==
=== Population ===
At the time of the 2006 National Census, the village's population was 769 in 149 households. The following census in 2011 counted 698 people in 191 households. The 2016 census measured the population of the village as 681 people in 173 households.
