= Aq Bolagh, Ardabil =

Village in Ardabil province, Iran

Aq Bolagh Persian: اق بلاغ
- Village
- Location within Iran
- Coordinates: 38°21′07″N 47°40′14″E
- Country: Iran
- Province: Ardabil
- County: Meshgin Shahr
- District: Central
- Rural District: Dasht

Population (2016)
  - Total: 1,762
- Time zone: UTC+3:30 (IRST)

Aq Bolagh (Persian: اق بلاغ) (Note: Also romanized as Āq Bolāgh; also known as Āgh Bolāgh) is a village in Dasht Rural District of the Central District in Meshgin Shahr County, Ardabil province, Iran.

== Demographics ==
=== Population ===
At the time of the 2006 National Census, the village's population was 1,489 in 312 households. The following census in 2011 counted 1,357 people in 418 households. The 2016 census measured the population of the village as 1,762 people in 540 households.
