= Nasrabad, Ardabil =

Village in Ardabil province, Iran

Nasrabad Persian: ناصراباد
- Village
- Location within Iran
- Coordinates: 38°25′43″N 47°40′02″E
- Country: Iran
- Province: Ardabil
- County: Meshgin Shahr
- District: Central
- Rural District: Meshgin-e Sharqi

Population (2016)
  - Total: 89
- Time zone: UTC+3:30 (IRST)

Nasrabad (Persian: ناصراباد) (Note: Also romanized as Nāṣrābād; also known as Dīzū and Nāṣīrābād) is a village in Meshgin-e Sharqi Rural District of the Central District in Meshgin Shahr County, Ardabil province, Iran.

== Demographics ==
=== Population ===
At the time of the 2006 National Census, the village's population was 103 in 21 households. The following census in 2011 counted 93 people in 23 households. The 2016 census measured the population of the village as 89 people in 24 households.
