= Tobnaq =

Village in Ardabil province, Iran

Tobnaq Persian: تبنق
- Village
- Location within Iran
- Coordinates: 38°30′48″N 47°35′25″E
- Country: Iran
- Province: Ardabil
- County: Meshgin Shahr
- District: Central
- Rural District: Dasht

Population (2016)
  - Total: 458
- Time zone: UTC+3:30 (IRST)

Tobnaq (Persian: تبنق) (Note: Also known as Tūbnaq) is a village in Dasht Rural District of the Central District in Meshgin Shahr County, Ardabil province, Iran.

== Demographics ==
=== Population ===
At the time of the 2006 National Census, the village's population was 666 in 139 households. The following census in 2011 counted 612 people in 161 households. The 2016 census measured the population of the village as 458 people in 146 households.
