= Ali Mohammadlu, Meshgin Shahr =

Village in Ardabil province, Iran

Ali Mohammadlu Persian: علي محمدلو
- Village
- Location within Iran
- Coordinates: 38°30′52″N 47°41′49″E
- Country: Iran
- Province: Ardabil
- County: Meshgin Shahr
- District: Central
- Rural District: Meshgin-e Sharqi

Population (2016)
  - Total: 26
- Time zone: UTC+3:30 (IRST)

Ali Mohammadlu (Persian: علي محمدلو) (Note: Also romanized as ‘Alī Moḩammadlū) is a village in Meshgin-e Sharqi Rural District of the Central District in Meshgin Shahr County, Ardabil province, Iran.

== Demographics ==
=== Population ===
At the time of the 2006 National Census, the village's population was 21 in six households. The following census in 2011 counted a population below the reporting threshold. The 2016 census measured the population of the village as 26 people in nine households.
