= Parikhan =

Village in Ardabil province, Iran

Parikhan Persian: پريخان
- Village
- Location within Iran
- Coordinates: 38°24′52″N 47°38′41″E
- Country: Iran
- Province: Ardabil
- County: Meshgin Shahr
- District: Central
- Rural District: Dasht

Population (2016)
  - Total: 2,189
- Time zone: UTC+3:30 (IRST)

Parikhan (Persian: پريخان) (Note: Also romanized as Parīkhān and Perī Khān; also known as Pīrī Khān) is a village in, and the capital of, Dasht Rural District in the Central District of Meshgin Shahr County, Ardabil province, Iran.

== Demographics ==
=== Population ===
At the time of the 2006 National Census, the village's population was 3,527 in 803 households. The following census in 2011 counted 2,736 people in 745 households. The 2016 census measured the population of the village as 2,189 people in 854 households.
