= Sati-ye Sofla =

Village in Ardabil province, Iran

Sati-ye Sofla Persian: ساطي سفلي
- Village
- Location within Iran
- Coordinates: 38°22′21″N 47°24′36″E
- Country: Iran
- Province: Ardabil
- County: Meshgin Shahr
- District: Qosabeh
- Rural District: Shaban

Population (2016)
  - Total: 67
- Time zone: UTC+3:30 (IRST)

Sati-ye Sofla (Persian: ساطي سفلي) (Note: Also romanized as Sāţī-ye Soflá) is a village in Shaban Rural District of Qosabeh District in Meshgin Shahr County, Ardabil province, Iran.

== Demographics ==
=== Population ===
At the time of the 2006 National Census, the village's population was 188 in 38 households, when it was in the Central District. The following census in 2011 counted 156 people in 35 households. The 2016 census measured the population of the village as 67 people in 21 households, by which time the rural district had been separated from the district in the formation of Qosabeh District.
