= Saheb Divan =

Village in Ardabil province, Iran

Saheb Divan Persian: صاحب ديوان
- Village
- Location within Iran
- Coordinates: 38°30′35″N 47°31′40″E
- Country: Iran
- Province: Ardabil
- County: Meshgin Shahr
- District: Central
- Rural District: Dasht

Population (2016)
  - Total: 590
- Time zone: UTC+3:30 (IRST)

Saheb Divan (Persian: صاحب ديوان) (Note: Also romanized as Şāḩeb Dīvān) is a village in Dasht Rural District of the Central District in Meshgin Shahr County, Ardabil province, Iran.

== Demographics ==
=== Population ===
At the time of the 2006 National Census, the village's population was 816 in 163 households. The following census in 2011 counted 732 people in 181 households. The 2016 census measured the population of the village as 590 people in 155 households.
