= UR =

UR, Ur or ur may refer to:

== Arts and entertainment ==
=== Gaming ===
- Ur, a fictional village in Final Fantasy III
- Royal Game of Ur, an ancient board game

=== Music ===
==== General ====
- UR (band), a satellite band of Secret Chiefs 3
- Underground Resistance, a US musical collective
- Universal Records (Philippines), a Philippine record label

==== Songs ====
- "UR" ("you are"), a song from the album Supposed Former Infatuation Junkie, by Alanis Morissette
- "U R", a song from the EP Follow: Find You, by Monsta X
- "U R", a song from I (Taeyeon EP)
- "Ur", a song from the EP Z (EP), by SZA
- "UR/A Tear in the Open", a song from the album Just Be, by DJ Tiësto

=== Other media ===
- Ur (novella), by Stephen King
- MPAA rating system — UR, indicating a work not submitted for rating
- UR Cristiano, the YouTube channel of association footballer Cristiano Ronaldo
- Utbildningsradion (UR), the Swedish Educational Broadcasting Company

== Language ==
- Úr (ᚒ), a letter of the Ogham alphabet
- Ur (cuneiform)
- ur (digraph)
- Ur (rune) (ᚢ)
- Underlying representation, in phonology
- Urdu, a language (ISO 639 code "ur")
- ur-, prefix meaning proto- or arch-

== Places ==
=== Ancient ===
- Ur, an ancient city-state in southern Mesopotamia
- Ur of the Chaldees, or Ur Kaśdim, scriptural birthplace of Abraham

=== Modern ===
- Ur, Pyrénées-Orientales, a commune of the Pyrénées-Orientales Département, France
- Ur, Iran, a village in Ardabil Province
- Hayy Ur, a neighborhood of Baghdad, Iraq
- Canton of Uri, Switzerland

== Religion and esotericism ==
- Ur (Mandaeism), the king of the underworld in Mandaeism
- UR Group, Italian esotericist association

== Science, technology, and mathematics ==
- Ur (continent), hypothetically formed about 3.1 billion years ago
- Ur (programming language)
- UR Mark, a certification mark of Underwriters Laboratories
- Karabin przeciwpancerny wzór 35, a Polish anti-tank rifle (codename "Uruguay")
- Unitary representation, in group theory
- Uranium, an element formerly having symbol "Ur"

=== Vehicles ===
- Universal Rocket, a family of Russian rockets developed by Khrunichev
- UrQuattro, prefix of the original Audi Quattro automobile, 1980–1991
- Ursaab, prefix of the original Saab automobile, 1949

== Universities ==
=== United States ===
- University of Richmond, in Virginia
- University of Rochester, in New York
- University of Redlands, in California

=== Other countries ===
- Universität Regensburg, Germany
- University of Regina, Canada
- Universidad Regiomontana, Monterrey, Mexico
- University of La Réunion, France
- University of La Rioja, Spain
- University of Rwanda

== Other meanings ==
- DWLA-FM, with former name "UR 105.9"
- Uganda Airlines (IATA code)
- Universal Robina, food and beverage company in the Philippines
- Ulster Resistance, an Irish paramilitary group
- Ulster Rugby, rugby union team of Ulster, Ireland
- Ukraine (aircraft registration prefix UR)
- United Russia, ruling party of the Russian Federation

== See also ==
- Ur-Fascism
- Urtext (disambiguation)
