= Ganduz, Ardabil =

Village in Ardabil province, Iran

Ganduz Persian: گندوز
- Village
- Country: Iran
- Province: Ardabil
- County: Meshgin Shahr
- District: Qosabeh
- Rural District: Shaban

Population (2016)
  - Total: 73
- Time zone: UTC+3:30 (IRST)

Ganduz (Persian: گندوز) (Note: Also romanized as Gandūz) is a village in Shaban Rural District of Qosabeh District in Meshgin Shahr County, Ardabil province, Iran.

== Demographics ==
=== Population ===
At the time of the 2006 National Census, the village's population was 116 in 25 households, when it was in the Central District. The following census in 2011 counted 111 people in 28 households. The 2016 census measured the population of the village as 73 people in 23 households, by which time the rural district had been separated from the district in the formation of Qosabeh District.
