= Aq Daraq, Meshgin Shahr =

Village in Ardabil province, Iran

Aq Daraq Persian: اق درق
- Village
- Location within Iran
- Coordinates: 38°31′32″N 47°40′13″E
- Country: Iran
- Province: Ardabil
- County: Meshgin Shahr
- District: Central
- Rural District: Meshgin-e Sharqi

Population (2016)
  - Total: 442
- Time zone: UTC+3:30 (IRST)

Aq Daraq (Persian: اق درق) (Note: Also romanized as Āq Daraq; also known as Āgh Daraq) is a village in Meshgin-e Sharqi Rural District of the Central District in Meshgin Shahr County, Ardabil province, Iran.

== Demographics ==
=== Population ===
At the time of the 2006 National Census, the village's population was 164 in 42 households. The following census in 2011 counted 386 people in 106 households. The 2016 census measured the population of the village as 442 people in 126 households.
