= Jabdaraq =

Village in Ardabil province, Iran

Jabdaraq Persian: جبدرق
- Village
- Location within Iran
- Coordinates: 38°29′51″N 47°36′51″E
- Country: Iran
- Province: Ardabil
- County: Meshgin Shahr
- District: Central
- Rural District: Dasht

Population (2016)
  - Total: 2,441
- Time zone: UTC+3:30 (IRST)

Jabdaraq (Persian: جبدرق) (Note: Also known as Jidaragh and Jīdaraq) is a village in Dasht Rural District of the Central District in Meshgin Shahr County, Ardabil province, Iran.

== Demographics ==
=== Population ===
At the time of the 2006 National Census, the village's population was 2,460 in 521 households. The following census in 2011 counted 2,494 people in 652 households. The 2016 census measured the population of the village as 2,441 people in 698 households. It was the most populous village in its rural district.
