= Barezil =

Village in Ardabil province, Iran

Barezil Persian: بارزيل
- Village
- Location within Iran
- Coordinates: 38°26′33″N 47°40′45″E
- Country: Iran
- Province: Ardabil
- County: Meshgin Shahr
- District: Central
- Rural District: Dasht

Population (2016)
  - Total: 445
- Time zone: UTC+3:30 (IRST)

Barezil (Persian: بارزيل) (Note: Also romanized as Bārezīl; also known as Bāzerīl) is a village in Dasht Rural District of the Central District in Meshgin Shahr County, Ardabil province, Iran.

== Demographics ==
=== Population ===
At the time of the 2006 National Census, the village's population was 465 in 117 households. The following census in 2011 counted 487 people in 122 households. The 2016 census measured the population of the village as 445 people in 128 households.
