= Valiabad, Ardabil =

Village in Ardabil province, Iran

Valiabad Persian: ولي اباد
- Village
- Location within Iran
- Coordinates: 38°18′43″N 47°40′40″E
- Country: Iran
- Province: Ardabil
- County: Meshgin Shahr
- District: Central
- Rural District: Dasht

Population (2016)
  - Total: 192
- Time zone: UTC+3:30 (IRST)

Valiabad (Persian: ولي اباد) (Note: Also romanized as Valīābād; also known as Valehzīr) is a village in Dasht Rural District of the Central District in Meshgin Shahr County, Ardabil province, Iran.

== Demographics ==
=== Population ===
At the time of the 2006 National Census, the village's population was 223 in 46 households. The following census in 2011 counted 197 people in 55 households. The 2016 census measured the population of the village as 192 people in 62 households.
