= Kur Bolagh, Ardabil =

Village in Ardabil province, Iran

Kur Bolagh Persian: كوربلاغ
- Village
- Location within Iran
- Coordinates: 38°29′01″N 47°43′48″E
- Country: Iran
- Province: Ardabil
- County: Meshgin Shahr
- District: Central
- Rural District: Meshgin-e Sharqi

Population (2016)
  - Total: 224
- Time zone: UTC+3:30 (IRST)

Kur Bolagh (Persian: كوربلاغ) (Note: Also romanized as Kūr Bolāgh) is a village in Meshgin-e Sharqi Rural District of the Central District in Meshgin Shahr County, Ardabil province, Iran.

== Demographics ==
=== Population ===
At the time of the 2006 National Census, the village's population was 294 in 68 households. The following census in 2011 counted 246 people in 63 households. The 2016 census measured the population of the village as 224 people in 69 households.
