= Hasanabad, Ardabil =

Village in Ardabil province, Iran

Hasanabad Persian: حسن‌آباد
- Village
- Country: Iran
- Province: Ardabil
- County: Meshgin Shahr
- District: Central
- Rural District: Meshgin-e Sharqi

Population (2016)
  - Total: 200
- Time zone: UTC+3:30 (IRST)

Hasanabad (Persian: حسن‌آباد) (Note: Also romanized as Ḩasanābād) is a village in Meshgin-e Sharqi Rural District of the Central District in Meshgin Shahr County, Ardabil province, Iran.

== Demographics ==
=== Population ===
At the time of the 2006 National Census, the village's population was 267 in 64 households. The following census in 2011 counted 248 people in 65 households. The 2016 census measured the population of the village as 200 people in 64 households.
