= Arablu, Ardabil =

Village in Ardabil province, Iran

Arablu Persian: عربلو
- Village
- Location within Iran
- Coordinates: 38°28′29″N 47°40′18″E
- Country: Iran
- Province: Ardabil
- County: Meshgin Shahr
- District: Central
- Rural District: Dasht

Population (2016)
  - Total: 400
- Time zone: UTC+3:30 (IRST)

Arablu (Persian: عربلو) (Note: Also romanized as ‘Arablū; also known as ‘Arablī) is a village in Dasht Rural District of the Central District in Meshgin Shahr County, Ardabil province, Iran.

== Demographics ==
=== Population ===
At the time of the 2006 National Census, the village's population was 502 in 107 households. The following census in 2011 counted 453 people in 114 households. The 2016 census measured the population of the village as 400 people in 117 households.
