= Qarah Gol, Meshgin Shahr =

Village in Ardabil province, Iran

Qarah Gol Persian: قره گل
- Village
- Location within Iran
- Coordinates: 38°24′41″N 47°35′50″E
- Country: Iran
- Province: Ardabil
- County: Meshgin Shahr
- District: Central
- Rural District: Dasht

Population (2016)
  - Total: 228
- Time zone: UTC+3:30 (IRST)

Qarah Gol (Persian: قره گل) (Note: Also romanized as Qareh Gol) is a village in Dasht Rural District of the Central District in Meshgin Shahr County, Ardabil province, Iran.

== Demographics ==
=== Population ===
At the time of the 2006 National Census, the village's population was 349 in 65 households. The following census in 2011 counted 245 people in 66 households. The 2016 census measured the population of the village as 228 people in 69 households.
