= Sarbanlar =

Sarbanlar (Persian: ساربانلر or ساربانلار) may refer to:

- Sarbanlar, Ardabil (ساربانلار - Sārbānlār)
- Sarbanlar, Hamadan (ساربانلر - Sārbānlar)
