= Qurt Tappeh =

Qurt Tappeh (Persian: قورت تپه) may refer to:

- Qurt Tappeh, Meshgin Shahr, Ardabil Province
- Qurt Tappeh, Moradlu, Meshgin Shahr County, Ardabil Province
- Qurt Tappeh, West Azerbaijan
