= Ur, Iran =

Village in Ardabil province, Iran

Ur Persian: عور
- Village
- Location within Iran
- Coordinates: 38°21′13″N 47°37′56″E
- Country: Iran
- Province: Ardabil
- County: Meshgin Shahr
- District: Central
- Rural District: Dasht

Population (2016)
  - Total: 390
- Time zone: UTC+3:30 (IRST)

Ur (Persian: عور) (Note: Also romanized as ‘Ūr; also known as Ghūr) is a village in Dasht Rural District of the Central District in Meshgin Shahr County, Ardabil province, Iran.

== Demographics ==
=== Population ===
At the time of the 2006 National Census, the village's population was 506 in 103 households, when it was in Meshgin-e Gharbi Rural District. The following census in 2011 counted 463 people in 109 households. The 2016 census measured the population of the village as 390 people in 111 households, by which time Ur had been transferred to Dasht Rural District.
