= Dowlatabad, Meshgin Shahr =

Former village in Ardabil province, Iran

Dowlatabad Persian: دولت اباد
- Former Village
- Country: Iran
- Province: Ardabil
- County: Meshgin Shahr
- District: Central
- Rural District: Meshgin-e Sharqi

Population (2011)
  - Total: 1,318
- Time zone: UTC+3:30 (IRST)

Dowlatabad (Persian: دولت اباد) (Note: Also romanized as Dowlatābād) was a village in Meshgin-e Sharqi Rural District of the Central District in Meshgin Shahr County, Ardabil province, Iran.

== Demographics ==
=== Population ===
At the time of the 2006 National Census, the village's population was 1,315 in 334 households. The following census in 2011 counted 1,318 people in 387 households. The village did not appear in the 2016 census.
