= Gellar-e Mohammad Taqi =

Village in Ardabil province, Iran

Gellar-e Mohammad Taqi Persian: گللرمحمدتقي
- Village
- Location within Iran
- Coordinates: 38°30′17″N 47°41′01″E
- Country: Iran
- Province: Ardabil
- County: Meshgin Shahr
- District: Central
- Rural District: Meshgin-e Sharqi

Population (2016)
  - Total: 293
- Time zone: UTC+3:30 (IRST)

Gellar-e Mohammad Taqi (Persian: گللرمحمدتقي) (Note: Also romanized as Gellar-e Moḩammad Taqī and Gellar-e Moḩammadtaqī; also known as Gellar-e Taqī) is a village in Meshgin-e Sharqi Rural District of the Central District in Meshgin Shahr County, Ardabil province, Iran.

== Demographics ==
=== Population ===
At the time of the 2006 National Census, the village's population was 118 in 30 households. The following census in 2011 counted 100 people in 25 households. The 2016 census measured the population of the village as 293 people in 85 households.
