= U of R =

U of R may refer to:

in Canada

- University of Regina

in the United States

- University of Redlands
- University of Richmond
- University of Rochester

in the United Kingdom

- University of Reading

== See also ==
- UR (disambiguation)
