= Dakshayani (disambiguation) =

Dākṣāyaṇī is another name of the Hindu goddess Sati, the daughter of Daksha.

Dakshayani may also refer to:

- Dakshayani Velayudhan, Indian politician from Kerala
  - Dakshayani Velayudhan Award, annual state award of Kerala, India
- Chengalloor Dakshayani, Indian elephant

== See also ==
- Sati (disambiguation)
