= Christopher Pike (author) =

American author

- Born: Kevin Christopher McFadden; November 12, 1955 (age 71); New York City, U.S.
- Occupation: Author
- Writing career
- Period: 1985–present
- Genres: Horror, thriller, science fiction, young adult

Kevin Christopher McFadden (born November 12, 1955), known by his pseudonym Christopher Pike, is an American author of children's fiction and for mystery-thrillers and supernatural horror fiction, mainly for young adults though he has also published adult fiction.

== Biography ==
McFadden was born in New York City in 1955, but grew up in California. He attended college briefly before quitting and working various jobs such as house painting and computer programming. He initially tried writing science fiction and adult mystery, but later began writing teen thrillers due to an editor's suggestion.

His first novel, Slumber Party, was written initially as a supernatural thriller containing a character with pyrokinesis (psychic ability to start and control fire), which he later eliminated upon the request of his editor. The book was then re-written as a mystery thriller about a group of teenagers who encounter bizarre and violent events during a skiing weekend. His editor sold the book to Scholastic Press, which released it in 1985. Pike's next novel, Weekend, was also published through Scholastic. He would later publish one more novel through Scholastic, the 1986 Chain Letter, after which he engaged mainly with Simon and Schuster.

Pike continued to write several young adult novels, and also juvenile novels comprising the series Spooksville, as well as several adult novels such as his 1990 book, Sati. Spooksville was adapted into a television series in 2013 for the Hub network (now known as Discovery Family).

== Adaptations ==
On November 25, 1996, Pike's novel Fall Into Darkness was adapted into a television movie of the same name, produced by his company Christopher Pike Productions. His novels The Midnight Club and The Season of Passage have both been optioned, for a television series and movie, by movie-maker Mike Flanagan for Netflix. The Midnight Club was released on Netflix on October 7, 2022. Two days after the series' release, on October 9, Flanagan confirmed that Netflix had in fact optioned "28 books" of Pike's, and that he had advocated The Midnight Club television series as "'The Midnight Club' — but the stories the kids tell [each other] will be other Christopher Pike books", with a plan for the series to last multiple seasons. However, in December 2022 it was announced the series had been cancelled after only one season. In March 2026, it was announced that Tubi would be adapting the 'Remember Me' series.

== Works ==
=== Young adult fiction ===
- Slumber Party (1985)
- Weekend (1986)
- The Tachyon Web (1986)
- Last Act (1988)
- Spellbound (1988)
- Gimme a Kiss (1988)
- Remember Me (1989)
- Scavenger Hunt (1989)
- Fall into Darkness (1990)
- See You Later (1990)
- Witch (1990)
- Whisper of Death (1991)
- Die Softly (1991)
- Bury Me Deep (1991)
- Master of Murder (1992)
- Monster (1992)
- Road to Nowhere (1993)
- The Eternal Enemy (1993)
- The Immortal (1993)
- The Wicked Heart (1993)
- The Midnight Club (1994)
- The Lost Mind (1995)
- The Visitor (1995)
- The Starlight Crystal (1996)
- The Star Group (1997)
- Execution of Innocence (1997)
- Hollow Skull (1998)
- Magic Fire (1999)
- The Grave (1999)
- The Secret of Ka (2010)
- To Die For – Omnibus collects Slumber Party and Weekend (2010)
- Bound to You – Omnibus collects Spellbound and See You Later (2012)
- Witch World (2012)
- Black Knight - Witch World 2 (2014)
- Strange Girl (2015)

=== Series ===
Cheerleaders

- Cheerleaders #2: Getting Even (1985)

(Christopher Pike only wrote one book of this forty-seven-book series. Other writers of this series include Caroline B. Cooney and Diane Hoh.)

Chain Letter

- Chain Letter (1986)
- Chain Letter 2: The Ancient Evil (1992)
- Chained Together – Omnibus, collects Chain Letter 1 and 2. (1994)

Final Friends

- Final Friends 1: The Party (1988)
- Final Friends 2: The Dance (1988)
- Final Friends 3: The Graduation (1989)
- Final Friends Trilogy – Omnibus, collects Final Friends 1, 2 and 3 (1999)
- Until the End – Omnibus, collects Final Friends 1, 2 and 3 (2011)

Remember Me

- Remember Me (1989)
- Remember Me 2: The Return (1994)
- Remember Me 3: The Last Story (1995)
- Remember Me – Omnibus, collects Remember Me 1, 2 and 3 (2010) As of March 2026, an adaption on Tubi is in the works

The Last Vampire/Thirst

- The Last Vampire (1994)
- The Last Vampire 2: Black Blood (1994)
- The Last Vampire 3: Red Dice (1995)
- The Last Vampire 4: Phantom (1996)
- The Last Vampire 5: Evil Thirst (1996)
- The Last Vampire 6: Creatures of Forever (1996)
- Thirst No. 1 – Omnibus collects The Last Vampire 1, 2 and 3. (2009)
- Thirst No. 2 – Omnibus collects The Last Vampire 4, 5 and 6. (2010)
- Thirst No. 3: The Eternal Dawn (2010)
- Thirst No. 4: The Shadow of Death (2011)
- Thirst – Boxed set collects Thirst No. 1, 2, and 3 (2013)
- Thirst No. 5: The Sacred Veil (2013)

Spooksville

- Spooksville – series of 24 children's books (1995–1998)

Alosha

- Alosha (2004) (An animated movie version was in development, according to Pike's Facebook page.)
- The Shaktra (2005)
- The Yanti (2006)

=== Short stories ===
- Tales of Terror – Six original short stories, includes a Master of Murder sequel: The Fan from Hell (1997)
- Tales of Terror #2 – Five original short stories, includes a Master of Murder sequel: The Burning Witch (1998)

=== Anthologies ===
- Thirteen: 13 Tales of Horror by 13 Masters of Horror – ed. T. Pines; contains Pike's stories Collect Call and Collect Call 2: The Black Walker (1991)
- 666: The Number of the Beast – contains Pike's story Saving Face (2007)

=== Adult fiction ===
- Sati (1990)
- The Season of Passage (1992)
- The Listeners (1995)
- The Cold One (1995)
- The Blind Mirror (2003)
- Falling (2007)

== See also ==
- R. L. Stine
