= Savojbolagh, Ardabil =

Village in Ardabil province, Iran

Savojbolagh Persian: ساوجبلاغ
- Village
- Location within Iran
- Coordinates: 38°22′43″N 47°29′51″E
- Country: Iran
- Province: Ardabil
- County: Meshgin Shahr
- District: Qosabeh
- Rural District: Shaban

Population (2016)
  - Total: 19
- Time zone: UTC+3:30 (IRST)

Savojbolagh (Persian: ساوجبلاغ) (Note: Also romanized as Sāvojbolāgh) is a village in Shaban Rural District of Qosabeh District in Meshgin Shahr County, Ardabil province, Iran.

== Demographics ==
=== Population ===
At the time of the 2006 National Census, the village's population was 38 in seven households, when it was in the Central District. The following census in 2011 counted 40 people in 12 households. The 2016 census measured the population of the village as 19 people in six households, by which time the rural district had been separated from the district in the formation of Qosabeh District.
