= Pashalu, Meshgin-e Sharqi =

Village in Ardabil province, Iran

Pashalu Persian: پاشالو
- Village
- Location within Iran
- Coordinates: 38°30′11″N 47°40′06″E
- Country: Iran
- Province: Ardabil
- County: Meshgin Shahr
- District: Central
- Rural District: Meshgin-e Sharqi

Population (2016)
  - Total: 21
- Time zone: UTC+3:30 (IRST)

Pashalu (Persian: پاشالو) (Note: Also romanized as Pāshālū) is a village in Meshgin-e Sharqi Rural District of the Central District in Meshgin Shahr County, Ardabil province, Iran.

== Demographics ==
=== Population ===
The village did not appear in the 2006 and 2011 National Censuses. The 2016 census measured the population of the village as 21 people in seven households.
