= Remember Me (book series) =

Book series by Christopher Pike

- Remember Me; Remember Me 2: The Return; Remember Me 3: The Last Story
- Author: Christopher Pike
- Country: United States
- Language: English
- Genre: Dark Fantasy Horror Mystery Thriller
- Publisher: Simon & Schuster
- Published: 1989; 1994; 1995
- Media type: Print
- No. of books: 3

Remember Me is a Fantasy/Horror book series written by American author Christopher Pike. The series centers around the spirit of murdered teenager Shari Cooper, who solves the mystery of her own murder and later returns to life in another girl's body.

== Remember Me (1989) ==
Remember Me is a New York Times national bestseller. Shari Cooper had almost graduated from Hazzard High. Jo, Shari's best friend, is into the paranormal. When Shari goes to Jo's house to pick her up for the big party, Shari ends up finding pieces of paper that were a short story written by Peter Nichols, Shari's friend who had died. Coincidentally the girl's name in Peter's story was Ann, which Shari thinks has something to do with her, because that is her middle name. During Big Beth's party they play with a crystal and they are convinced Peter is talking to them. Shari finds out that her boyfriend cheated on her, and goes out onto the balcony to get some fresh air. The next thing she knows, she is waking up in her own bed. She goes downstairs to have breakfast with her family, but she can't pull the chair out and her parents and her brother Jim are ignoring her. Shari Cooper is dead. The only thing Shari Cooper can remember is falling off her friend's balcony during the party. Shari Cooper's death is seen as a suicide, but she knows that she was murdered.

Peter Nichols, also a ghost, attends Shari's funeral. Finally reunited, they comfort one another. They try to figure out who murdered Shari. Jo brings out the ouija board to contact Shari, but another force takes charge of it and tells them that Peter and Shari are burning in hell. A shadow chases Shari into the cemetery and when she runs into Peter, it disappears. Jo feels that Shari blames her for her death. Shari has a dream that tells her everything she needed to know: Shari was switched at birth by Jo's mother, a nurse. Jo and Shari are half sisters, while Jim's girlfriend Amanda is actually Jim's biological sister. Amanda knows about the switch, but is still in love with Jim. She attacks Jim so that no one else can have him; Peter intervenes, but his shadow attacks him and he falls to the floor.

Shari learns that Peter is vulnerable to the shadow because he killed himself. Together they fight back against the shadows, and help save Jim's life.

== Remember Me 2: The Return (1994) ==
Jean Rodrigues is eighteen and two weeks away from graduating from her high school. She doesn't want to end up like her mother, a single mom who works way too much. Jean's father died when she was a child. They live in a bad neighborhood, and to her, this is the worst. Jean's best friend Carol picks her up to go to a party. Jean plans on telling her boyfriend, Lenny, that she is six weeks pregnant. Carol is in love with Darlene, whose boyfriend, Sporty, recently died after being shot. He died in Lenny's arms, and after the party they have a meeting to plan revenge against his murderer, Juan.

Lenny and Jean argue about the planning of Juan's death. They go out onto the balcony, and fall. Shari Cooper then comes to Jean's rescue. She was told by Rishi that she could go back to Earth as a wanderer. So when Jean falls to her death, Shari Cooper takes over her body. Jean wakes up in the hospital after being in a coma for a few days and she asks about Lenny. Carol tells her that Lenny was also on the balcony, and he also fell and is in the hospital too. He is paralyzed from the waist down, and Jean also lost her baby.

Because wanderers do not know they are wanderers, Shari now thinks that she is Jean. Rishi had told Shari that wanderers have a mission and that is to find love, and help others find it as well. Jean is now volunteering at the hospital, and her mother wants to know if she had her personality swapped. Jean also decided to stop doing drugs, to make for a better life and as a way to get out of her neighborhood.

While Jean volunteers at the hospital she becomes friends with Debra, a cancer patient. After Jean is done at the hospital she goes to visit Lenny, who is very depressed, and he tries to convince Jean to kill him. After Jean leaves she decides to go swimming, but has to be rescued by a lifeguard. She then goes to visit Shari Cooper's brother Jim. She calls him Jimmy and offers to help him move out of his parents' house as long as he would give her a ride back home.

When Debra dies, Jean goes to visit her grave. While she is at the cemetery she finds Shari Cooper's grave as well, with a picture on it. Jean knows the girl in the picture as well as her own reflection. She goes visit Jimmy, Shari's brother. After talking for a bit, she reads the book Shari wrote and finally remembers that she is Shari. Jean gets a phone call from Carol that Darlene and Lenny are staging their revenge, and they have a gun. Jean goes over and she and Lenny fight, Jean convinces Lenny to go with her back to Jimmy's. As it turns out, Lenny killed Sporty and is trying to murder Jean. When Jean, after hanging from the side of the balcony yells out "Master!" Lenny softens and tries to catch Shari but she falls. The next chapter shows Rishi agreeing to let Peter as well as Shari come back as a wanderer, but The Rishi warns Peter that when he killed himself, he nearly survived and that had he lived he would have been crippled the rest of his days, and that if he comes back as a wanderer, he would be in a wheelchair. Peter says as long as he's with Shari he doesn't care. The epilogue tells us that Shari in swinging her right arm up pushes away from the balcony, which causes her to land in the pool below. It's only then we see that Peter is Lenny and he remembered finally who he was and he remembers Shari.

== Remember Me 3: The Last Story (1995) ==
Shari Cooper had already died once, and came back as a wanderer, a soul who has been given permission to take the place of another soul in another body. Shari, who took the body of Jean Rodrigues, now remembers who she used to be. She has also figured out the purpose to her new life, and why she had to come back. Shari starts to write her own stories—one of which is actually being made into a movie—and they become known across the whole world.

Then one night a story comes to her out of the blue, about love and magic. The story is ancient and it explains the purpose of humans, and why they walk the Earth.

She begins to write her story down, almost positive that it's just her writer's block becoming unstuck. Shari doesn't realize the danger she just started, because her story is true. It is the warning of danger to everyone in the whole world from creatures who do not like humans, but they also have it out for wanderers as well. They are monsters that will do anything to stop Shari from publishing the truth, even if that means making her fall for one of them, Roger, as a trap. Roger turns out to be a black wanderer, and he has to destroy Shari because of the story she is writing.

They're hidden, but they're watching around every corner. Shari risks it all, and this means Peter will lose his love of three years, and Shari may ruin everything and anything for this monster.

Peter finally starts to walk, and Shari goes to visit her actual mother; when she gets tucked in, she closes her eyes... forever.

Not long after Shari's passing, Jim concludes a visit with Peter, and feels a tap on his shoulder despite being alone in his home. Guessing what's going on, Jim sits down at his computer and begins to write Shari's final story.

== Remember Me collection ==
A compilation of all three books in the Remember Me series also exists. It was released in 2010 under the title Remember Me: Remember Me; The Return; The Last Story.

== Reception ==
Publishers Weekly commented that "[Remember Me]'s central mystery, though somewhat contrived, moves along briskly. Plenty of action combined with several creepy seance scenes keep the pages turning...some may question the prudence of presenting young readers with such a seductive vision of life after death."
