= Dasht Rural District (Meshgin Shahr County) =

Rural district in Ardabil province, Iran

Dasht Rural District Persian: دهستان دشت
- Rural District
- Location within Iran
- Coordinates: 38°26′N 47°37′E
- Country: Iran
- Province: Ardabil
- County: Meshgin Shahr
- District: Central
- Established: 1987
- Capital: Parikhan

Population (2016)
  - Total: 23,699
- Time zone: UTC+3:30 (IRST)

Dasht Rural District (Persian: دهستان دشت) is in the Central District of Meshgin Shahr County, Ardabil province, Iran. Its capital is the village of Parikhan.

== Demographics ==
=== Population ===
At the time of the 2006 National Census, the rural district's population was 19,750 in 4,288 households. There were 18,662 inhabitants in 5,143 households at the following census of 2011. The 2016 census measured the population of the rural district as 23,699 in 7,495 households. The most populous of its 28 villages was Jabdaraq, with 2,441 people.

=== Other villages in the rural district ===
- Ahmadabad
- Aluch
- Andazaq
- Aq Bolagh
- Arablu
- Barezil
- Dastgir
- Dust Beyglu
- Hiq
- Khorramabad
- Kujanaq
- Majandeh
- Movil
- Nasirabad
- Qarah Baghlar
- Qarah Gol
- Qerkh Bolagh
- Qurt Tappeh
- Saheb Divan
- Sarikhanlu
- Tobnaq
- Ur
- Valiabad
- Zir Zamin
