= Alni =

City in Ardabil province, Iran

Alni Persian: النی
- City
- Location within Iran
- Coordinates: 38°26′21″N 47°43′44″E
- Country: Iran
- Province: Ardabil
- County: Meshgin Shahr
- District: Central
- Established as a city: 2019

Population (2016)
  - Total: 3,739
- Time zone: UTC+3:30 (IRST)

Alni (Persian: النی) (Note: Also romanized as Ālnī; also known as ‘Ali, Āllī, and Elī) is a city in the Central District of Meshgin Shahr County, Ardabil province, Iran, serving as the administrative center for Meshgin-e Sharqi Rural District.

== Demographics ==
=== Population ===
At the time of the 2006 National Census, Alni's population was 2,945 in 755 households, when it was a village in Meshgin-e Sharqi Rural District. The following census in 2011 counted 3,303 people in 991 households. The 2016 census measured the population of the village as 3,739 people in 1,197 households. It was the most populous village in its rural district.

After the census, the village of Alni was converted to a city.

== Sports ==
Keshavarz Alni Football Club (Persian: کشاورز آلنی) is the local football team, competing in the Ardabil Provincial League.

== See also ==
- Meshginshahr
