= Alosha series =

Young adult fantasy novel series

Alosha
- Alosha, The Shaktra, The Yanti
- Author: Christopher Pike
- Country: United States
- Language: English
- Genre: Young adult novel
- Publisher: Tor Teen
- Published: 2004 - 2006
- Media type: Print (paperback), ebook

Alosha is a series of young adult fantasy novels by Christopher Pike. The first book in the series, Alosha, was released in 2004 through Tor Teen and follows a young girl who discovers that she must stop a threat that could destroy the Earth.

== Synopsis ==
Ali Warner was an average teenager until a hike near her house has her falling headfirst into a plan to stop a group of elementals from destroying the world. She's surprised to find that she is the one who must stop the group and that she's far more than what she initially seems to be. Everything ultimately depends on her and her friends' ability to find and claim a powerful talisman called the Yanti.

== Titles ==
1. Alosha (2004)
2. The Shaktra (2005)
3. The Yanti (2006)
4. Nemi (TBA)

== Reception ==
Critical reception for the series was mixed to positive. Reviews for Alosha were divided, with some reviewers criticizing the first novel as forgettable while others praised the realism of his characters' speech. The School Library Journal praised Alosha and The Yanti, stating that the third novel "contains some great action and ideas".

== Film ==
Throughout 2018 Pike reported, via Facebook that Alosha would be produced as a film. In April 2019, he reported that the production of the film would be announced in Beijing, China.
