= Sarbanlar, Ardabil =

Village in Ardabil province, Iran

Sarbanlar Persian: ساربانلار
- Village
- Location within Iran
- Coordinates: 38°25′12″N 47°46′00″E
- Country: Iran
- Province: Ardabil
- County: Meshgin Shahr
- District: Central
- Rural District: Meshgin-e Sharqi

Population (2016)
  - Total: 922
- Time zone: UTC+3:30 (IRST)

Sarbanlar (Persian: ساربانلار) (Note: Also romanized as Sārbānlār) is a village in Meshgin-e Sharqi Rural District of the Central District in Meshgin Shahr County, Ardabil province, Iran.

== Demographics ==
=== Population ===
At the time of the 2006 National Census, the village's population was 1,064 in 240 households. The following census in 2011 counted 967 people in 245 households. The 2016 census measured the population of the village as 922 people in 273 households.
