= Meshgin-e Sharqi Rural District =

Rural district in Ardabil province, Iran

Meshgin-e Sharqi Rural District Persian: دهستان مشگين شرقي
- Rural District
- Location within Iran
- Coordinates: 38°24′N 47°42′E
- Country: Iran
- Province: Ardabil
- County: Meshgin Shahr
- District: Central
- Established: 1987
- Capital: Alni

Population (2016)
  - Total: 9,749
- Time zone: UTC+3:30 (IRST)

Meshgin-e Sharqi Rural District (Persian: دهستان مشگين شرقي) is in the Central District of Meshgin Shahr County, Ardabil province, Iran. It is administered from the city of Alni.

== Demographics ==
=== Population ===
At the time of the 2006 National Census, the rural district's population was 10,335 in 2,496 households. There were 10,624 inhabitants in 2,982 households at the following census of 2011. The 2016 census measured the population of the rural district as 9,749 in 3,013 households. The most populous of its 24 villages was Alni (now a city), with 3,739 people.

=== Other villages in the rural district ===
- Ali Mohammadlu
- Aq Daraq
- Ballujeh Mirak
- Baris
- Bijaq
- Dowlatabad
- Ebrahim Kandi
- Gellar-e Mohammad Taqi
- Hajjilu
- Hasanabad
- Jafarabad
- Kur Bolagh
- Nasrabad
- Pashalu
- Qeshlaq-e Tang
- Sarbanlar
- Savareh
- Tak Dam
