= Savareh, Ardabil =

Village in Ardabil province, Iran

Savareh Persian: سواره
- Village
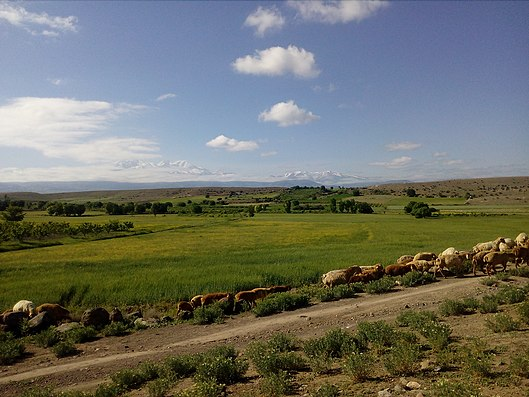
- The village of Savareh

- Location within Iran
- Coordinates: 38°31′19″N 47°42′19″E
- Country: Iran
- Province: Ardabil
- County: Meshgin Shahr
- District: Central
- Rural District: Meshgin-e Sharqi

Population (2016)
  - Total: 209
- Time zone: UTC+3:30 (IRST)

Savareh (Persian: سواره) (Note: Also romanized as Savāreh; also known as Savāreh-ye Bālā) is a village in Meshgin-e Sharqi Rural District of the Central District in Meshgin Shahr County, Ardabil province, Iran.

== Demographics ==
=== Population ===
At the time of the 2006 National Census, the village's population was 153 in 38 households. The following census in 2011 counted 155 people in 41 households. The 2016 census measured the population of the village as 209 people in 67 households.

== Overview ==
15 km towards Ardabil, after the village of Korbulaq, it is located on the left side and in the tourist area of Kapez. The people of this village are mostly engaged in animal husbandry and agriculture, and most of the orchards of this Rosna are apples, peaches and nectarines. This village has tourist attractions. Among them are Kepez, Samad Darsi, Delik Dash and Suyogh Bolaq, and many ancient artifacts from the ancient period can be seen in abundance in this village.

The people of this village are composed of 3 clans named Ivatli, Mughanlu and Chachikli, and the elders and elders of these clans are: Ali Ebadi, Mughanli: Hasan Rahor and Chachikli: Havar Nemati.

The water rights of this village rotate between 12 people and its water source is supplied from two springs that flow in the north and south sides.

The amenities of this village include piped drinking water, gas, electricity, and telephone.

Among the famous ancient Atha of this village is Shaitan Tepe. Tepe Shaitan Tepe Si belongs to the Sassanid period and this work was registered as one of the national works of Iran on January 12, 2006, with registration number 20330.

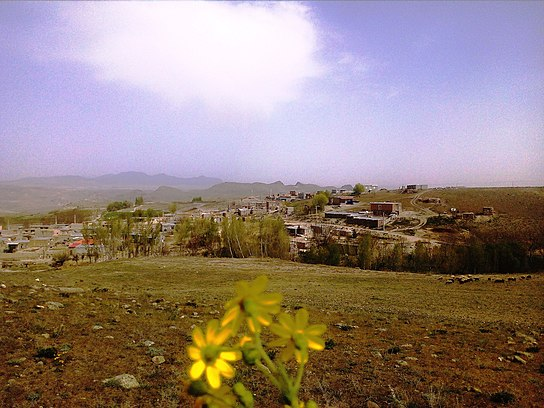
The village of Savareh
