= Qurt Tappeh, Meshgin Shahr =

Village in Ardabil province, Iran

Qurt Tappeh Persian: قورت تپه
- Village
- Location within Iran
- Coordinates: 38°25′51″N 47°37′28″E
- Country: Iran
- Province: Ardabil
- County: Meshgin Shahr
- District: Central
- Rural District: Dasht

Population (2016)
  - Total: 1,436
- Time zone: UTC+3:30 (IRST)

Qurt Tappeh (Persian: قورت تپه) (Note: Also romanized as Qūrt Tappeh; also known as Qūr Tappeh) is a village in Dasht Rural District of the Central District in Meshgin Shahr County, Ardabil province, Iran.

== Demographics ==
=== Population ===
At the time of the 2006 National Census, the village's population was 1,447 in 317 households. The following census in 2011 counted 1,688 people in 480 households. The 2016 census measured the population of the village as 1,436 people in 454 households.
