= Ardabil Provincial League =

- Country: Iran
- Confederation: AFC
- Number of clubs: 10
- Level on pyramid: 5
- Promotion to: 3rd Division
- Relegation to: Ardabil Provincial League 2
- Domestic cup: Hazfi Cup
- Broadcaster(s): Sabalan TV

Ardabil Provincial League is the premier football league of Ardabil province and is 5th in the Iranian football pyramid after the 3rd Division. It is part of the Vision Asia program.

== Teams 2012–13 ==
In total, 10 teams competed in the 2012–13 season.

- Dorostkaran Maghan
- Esteghlal Parsabad
- Ghandomkaran
- Abozar Parsabad
- Shahid
- Golshahr Niman
- Zob Ahan Ardabil
- Dahiari
- Esteghlal Sarein
- Shahid Tiraglu
- Keshavarz Alni
