= Qosabeh =

City in Ardabil province, Iran

Qosabeh Persian: قصابه
- City
- Location within Iran
- Coordinates: 38°23′04″N 47°32′43″E
- Country: Iran
- Province: Ardabil
- County: Meshgin Shahr
- District: Qosabeh
- Established as a city: 2012

Population (2016)
  - Total: 2,095
- Time zone: UTC+3:30 (IRST)

Qosabeh (Persian: قصابه) (Note: Also romanized as Qassabeh; Azerbaijani: Qəsəbə) is a city in, and the capital of, Qosabeh District in Meshgin Shahr County, Ardabil province, Iran. It also serves as the administrative center for Meshgin-e Gharbi Rural District.

== Demographics ==
=== Population ===
At the time of the 2006 National Census, Qosabeh's population was 2,110 in 488 households, when it was a village in Meshgin-e Gharbi Rural District of the Central District. The following census in 2011 counted 2,152 people in 592 households. The 2016 census measured the population as 2,095 people in 662 households, by which time the rural district had been separated from the district in the formation of Qosabeh District. Qosabeh was converted to a city in 2012.
