= Shaban Rural District (Meshgin Shahr County) =

Rural district in Ardabil province, Iran

Shaban Rural District Persian: دهستان شعبان
- Rural District
- Location within Iran
- Coordinates: 38°22′N 47°26′E
- Country: Iran
- Province: Ardabil
- County: Meshgin Shahr
- District: Qosabeh
- Established: 1987
- Capital: Shabanlu

Population (2016)
  - Total: 3,394
- Time zone: UTC+3:30 (IRST)

Shaban Rural District (Persian: دهستان شعبان) is in Qosabeh District of Meshgin Shahr County, Ardabil province, Iran. Its capital is the village of Shabanlu.

== Demographics ==
=== Population ===
At the time of the 2006 National Census, the rural district's population (as a part of the Central District) was 5,470 in 1,182 households. There were 4,372 inhabitants in 1,129 households at the following census of 2011. The 2016 census measured the population of the rural district as 3,394 in 1,111 households, by which time the rural district had been separated from the district in the formation of Qosabeh District. The most populous of its 38 villages was Salman Kandi, with 409 people.

=== Other villages in the rural district ===
- Ahl-e Iman
- Alamdar
- Anzan
- Aq Divar
- Aqchehlu
- Atashgah-e Jadid
- Dagh Kandi-ye Olya
- Ganduz
- Kalanpa
- Kalhor
- Karkasheh
- Kazemabad
- Khankandi
- Kuh Kenar
- Mizan
- Niaz Sui
- Pashalu
- Qinarjeh
- Sati-ye Olya
- Sati-ye Sofla
- Sati-ye Vosta
- Savojbolagh
- Shamsabad
- Sheykhlar
- Tazeh Kand-e Hajji Khan
- Yengejeh
