= Savareh-ye Babakan =

Savareh-ye Babakan سواره بابكان
- Village
- Location within Iran
- Coordinates: 30°40′42″N 51°15′08″E
- Country: Iran
- Province: Kohgiluyeh and Boyer-Ahmad
- County: Boyer-Ahmad
- Bakhsh: Central
- Rural District: Sepidar

Population (2006)
  - Total: 26
- Time zone: UTC+3:30 (IRST)
  - Summer (DST): UTC+4:30 (IRDT)

Savareh-ye Babakan (Persian: سواره بابكان, also Romanized as Savāreh-ye Bābakān; also known as Savāreh) is a village in Sepidar Rural District, in the Central District of Boyer-Ahmad County, Kohgiluyeh and Boyer-Ahmad Province, Iran. At the 2006 census, its population was 26, in 7 families.
