= Sarti, Punjab =

Village in Punjab

Sarti
- Village
- Location within Punjab Location within India
- Coordinates: 32°28′36″N 75°49′13″E
- Country: India
- State: Punjab
- District: Pathankot
- Tehsil: Dhar Kalan

Area
  - Total: 12.95 km^{2} (5.00 sq mi)
- Elevation: 529 m (1,736 ft)

Population (2011)
  - Total: 3,960
  - Density: 306/km^{2} (792/sq mi)
- Time zone: UTC+5:30 (IST)
- PIN: 145022

Sarti is a village in Dhar Kalan Tehsil, Pathankot District, Punjab, India. It is located 55 kilometres northeast of its district capital Pathankot, and 8 kilometres north of Dhar Kalan. As of the year 2011, its population is 3,960.

== Geography ==
Sarti is located on the eastern shore of the Ranjit Sagar Dam Lake, near the boundary with Kashmir. The village has an average elevation of 529 meters above the sea level.

== Climate ==
Sarti has a Humid Subtropical Climate (Cwa) according to the Köppen Climate Classification. It sees its driest month in October, with 19 mm of average rainfall, and its wettest month in July, with 400 mm of average rainfall.

Climate data for Sarti
| Month | Jan | Feb | Mar | Apr | May | Jun | Jul | Aug | Sep | Oct | Nov | Dec | Year |
|---|---|---|---|---|---|---|---|---|---|---|---|---|---|
| Mean daily maximum °C (°F) | 16.6 (61.9) | 19.2 (66.6) | 24.6 (76.3) | 30.8 (87.4) | 35 (95) | 34.6 (94.3) | 30.1 (86.2) | 29.1 (84.4) | 29 (84) | 27.7 (81.9) | 23.3 (73.9) | 19 (66) | 26.6 (79.8) |
| Daily mean °C (°F) | 10.3 (50.5) | 12.9 (55.2) | 17.7 (63.9) | 23.7 (74.7) | 28.3 (82.9) | 29.5 (85.1) | 27.1 (80.8) | 26.3 (79.3) | 25 (77) | 21.5 (70.7) | 16.6 (61.9) | 12.2 (54.0) | 20.9 (69.7) |
| Mean daily minimum °C (°F) | 4.4 (39.9) | 6.7 (44.1) | 10.3 (50.5) | 15.5 (59.9) | 19.9 (67.8) | 23 (73) | 23.8 (74.8) | 23.2 (73.8) | 20.3 (68.5) | 15.1 (59.2) | 10.2 (50.4) | 6.1 (43.0) | 14.9 (58.7) |
| Average rainfall mm (inches) | 99 (3.9) | 139 (5.5) | 95 (3.7) | 55 (2.2) | 30 (1.2) | 124 (4.9) | 400 (15.7) | 330 (13.0) | 121 (4.8) | 19 (0.7) | 20 (0.8) | 50 (2.0) | 1,482 (58.4) |
Source: Climate-Data.org

== Demographics ==
According to the 2011 census, Sarti has a population of 3,960, of which 2,023 are male and 1,937 are female. There are a total of 769 households within the village. Its literacy rate is 66.44%, with 1,489 of the male residents and 1,142 of the female residents being literate.
