= Seyyed Kandi, East Azerbaijan =

Seyyed Kandi سيدكندي
- Village
- Location within Iran
- Coordinates: 37°08′09″N 46°34′40″E
- Country: Iran
- Province: East Azerbaijan
- County: Maragheh
- Bakhsh: Saraju
- Rural District: Quri Chay-ye Gharbi

Population (2006)
  - Total: 156
- Time zone: UTC+3:30 (IRST)
  - Summer (DST): UTC+4:30 (IRDT)

Seyyed Kandi (Persian: سيدكندي, also Romanized as Seyyed Kandī) is a village in Quri Chay-ye Gharbi Rural District, Saraju District, Maragheh County, East Azerbaijan Province, Iran. At the 2006 census, its population was 156, in 25 families.
