= Urtext =

Urtext (German: Urtext, from ur- "primordial" and text "text", pronounced [ˈuːɐ̯tekst]) may refer to:

- Urtext (biblical studies), the text that is believed to precede both the Septuagint and the Masoretic text
- Urtext edition, in classical music, the version of the music as it was created by the composer
- Urtext Films, a film production company
