= Sati (novel) =

1990 novel by Christopher Pike

- First edition cover
- Author: Christopher Pike
- Language: English
- Genre: Fantasy literature
- Publication date: 1990
- Publication place: United States
- ISBN: 9780812510355

Sati is a fantasy novel by Christopher Pike. It was first published in September 1990.

== Plot summary ==
Michael is a trucker who picks up a blonde, blue-eyed, young female hitchhiker, Sati, in the Arizona desert. Sati claims that she is God, to Michael's disbelief, and sets out to prove this by spreading this message through organized meetings, and convinces many people of her divinity. She is challenged numerous times, once by a fundamentalist preacher, but emerges unscathed by his claims. Meanwhile, Michael sets out to find out where this "Sati" came from, only to find nothing. The book opens as such:

"I once knew this girl who thought she was God. She didn't give sight to the blind or raise the dead. She didn't even teach anything, not really, and she never told me anything I probably didn't already know. On the other hand, she didn't expect to be worshipped, nor did she ask for money. Given her high opinion of herself, some might call that a miracle. I don't know, maybe she was God. Her name was Sati, and she had blonde hair and blue eyes."

== See also ==
- The Last Vampire
