= Meshgin-e Gharbi Rural District =

Rural district in Ardabil province, Iran

Meshgin-e Gharbi Rural District Persian: دهستان مشگين غربي
- Rural District
- Location within Iran
- Coordinates: 38°20′N 47°33′E
- Country: Iran
- Province: Ardabil
- County: Meshgin Shahr
- District: Qosabeh
- Established: 1987
- Capital: Qosabeh

Population (2016)
  - Total: 3,904
- Time zone: UTC+3:30 (IRST)

Meshgin-e Gharbi Rural District (Persian: دهستان مشگين غربي) is in Qosabeh District of Meshgin Shahr County, Ardabil province, Iran. It is administered from the city of Qosabeh,

== Demographics ==
=== Population ===
At the time of the 2006 National Census, the rural district's population (as a part of the Central District) was 15,277 in 3,398 households. There were 14,185 inhabitants in 3,854 households at the following census of 2011. The 2016 census measured the population of the rural district as 3,904 in 1,181 households, by which time the rural district had been separated from the district in the formation of Qosabeh District. The most populous of its 18 villages was Ahmad Beyglu, with 1,133 people.

=== Other villages in the rural district ===
- Asrabad
- Balluqiyeh
- Bolus
- Gellar-e Mohammad Hasan
- Habash
- Jamalabad
- Khanjar
- Khvorshidabad
- Sachlu
- Seyyed Kandi
- Tazeh Kand-e Yuzbashi
