= Qosabeh District =

District in Ardabil province, Iran

Qosabeh District Persian: بخش قصابه
- District
- Location within Iran
- Coordinates: 38°20′N 47°29′E
- Country: Iran
- Province: Ardabil
- County: Meshgin Shahr
- Established: 2012
- Capital: Qosabeh

Population (2016)
  - Total: 9,393
- Time zone: UTC+3:30 (IRST)

Qosabeh District (Persian: بخش قصابه) is in Meshgin Shahr County, Ardabil province, Iran. Its capital is the city of Qosabeh.

== History ==
In 2012, Meshgin-e Gharbi and Shaban Rural Districts were separated from the Central District in the formation of Qosabeh District. At the same time, the village of Qosabeh was elevated to the status of a city.

== Demographics ==
=== Population ===
At the time of the 2016 National Census, the district's population was 9,393 inhabitants living in 2,954 households.

=== Administrative divisions ===
Qosabeh District Population
| Administrative Divisions | 2016 |
|---|---|
| Meshgin-e Gharbi RD | 3,904 |
| Shaban RD | 3,394 |
| Qosabeh (city) | 2,095 |
| Total | 9,393 |
RD = Rural District
