= Central District (Meshgin Shahr County) =

District in Ardabil province, Iran

Central District (Meshgin Shahr County) Persian: بخش مرکزی شهرستان مشگين شهر
- District
- Location within Iran
- Coordinates: 38°24′N 47°39′E
- Country: Iran
- Province: Ardabil
- County: Meshgin Shahr
- Capital: Meshginshahr

Population (2016)
  - Total: 107,557
- Time zone: UTC+3:30 (IRST)

The Central District of Meshgin Shahr County (Persian: بخش مرکزی شهرستان مشگين شهر) is in Ardabil province, Iran. Its capital is the city of Meshginshahr.

== History ==
In 2012, Meshgin-e Gharbi and Shaban Rural Districts were separated from the district in the formation of Qosabeh District. At the same time, the village of Qosabeh was converted to a city. The village of Alni also rose to city status in 2019.

== Demographics ==
=== Population ===
At the time of the 2006 National Census, the district's population was 112,128 in 26,284 households. The following census in 2011 counted 114,726 people in 30,979 households. The 2016 census measured the population of the district as 107,557 inhabitants living in 32,434 households.

=== Administrative divisions ===
Central District (Meshgin Shahr County) Population
Administrative Divisions	2006	2011	2016
Dasht RD	19,750	18,662	23,699
Meshgin-e Gharbi RD (Note: Transferred to Qosabeh District)	15,277	14,185	
Meshgin-e Sharqi RD	10,335	10,624	9,749
Shaban RD	5,470	4,372	
Alni (city) (Note: Became a city after the 2016 census)			
Meshginshahr (city)	61,296	66,883	74,109
Total	112,128	114,726	107,557
RD = Rural District
