= List of cities, towns and villages in Ardabil province =

A list of cities, towns and villages in Ardabil Province of north-western Iran:

== Main cities ==
- Ardabil (Pop. 340,386 (2001))
- Bileh Savar (Pop. 13,253 (2001))
- Germi (Pop. 30,000 (est))
- Givi (or "Kivi")
- Khalkhal
- Meshgin Shahr
- Namin
- Nir
- Parsabad (Pop. 48,147 (2001))
- Sareyin

== Alphabetical ==
Cities are in bold text; all others are villages.

=== A ===
Abadabad | Abazar | Abbas Alilu | Abbas Kandi | Abbas Qeshlaqi | Abbasabad | Abbasali Kandi | Abdol Rezaabad | Ab-e Garm-e Givy | Abi Beyglu | Abr Bakuh | Adam Darrehsi-ye Olya | Adam Darrehsi-ye Sofla | Afchi | Afshar-e Olya | Afsuran | Aftabeh | Agh Bad-e Gaduk | Agh Bolagh-e Mostafa Khan | Agh Bolagh-e Olya | Agh Bolagh-e Sofla | Agh Davahlu-ye Olya | Agh Tappeh | Agh Zaman Kandi | Aghbolagh | Aghcheh Kohol | Aghcheh Qeshlaq | Aghcheh Qeshlaq-e Olya | Aghcheh Qeshlaq-e Sofla | Agricultural Research Station | Ahad Beyglu | Ahl-e Iman | Ahmad Beyglu | Ahmadabad | Ahmadabad | Ahmadabad | Ahu Qaleh | Ahu | Ainalu | Ajghaz | Ajirlu | Akbar Davud-e Qeshlaqi | Akbar Kandi | Akbarabad | Al Qanab | Ala ol Din | Alachiq Tapahsi | Aladizgeh | Alamdar | Alamlu Shah Ali | Alamlu Tabriz | Alankash | Alardeh | Aldashin | Alhashem-e Olya | Alhashem-e Sofla | Ali Bolaghi | Ali Kahrizi | Ali Kahrizi | Ali Kamar | Ali Khan Kandi | Ali Mohammadlu | Ali Mohammadlu | Ali Qapu | Ali Qeshlaqi | Ali Shansuyi | Ali Verdilu | Aliabad | Aliabad | Aliabad | Aliabad | Aliabad | Alikaran | Alilah | Alileh Sar | Alishan Qeshlaqi | Alivash | Allah Yarlu | Allahlu | Almagalan | Almas | Alni | Alu | Aluch | Alucheh-ye Fuladlu | Alucheh-ye Sabalan | Alvars | Aminabad | Aminlu | Amir Kandi | Amir Khanlu | Amirabad | Amirabad | Amrahlu | Amuqin | Amurab Moghan Lake Camp | Anaviz | Anbaran | Anbaran-e Olya | Anbarlu | Andabil | Andar Ab | Andazaq | Angurd | Angurtlar-e Sofla | Ani-ye Olya | Ani-ye Sofla | Ani-ye Vosta | Anjirlu | Anjirlu | Anzab-e Olya | Anzab-e Sofla | Anzan | Aq Bash | Aq Bolagh | Aq Bolagh-e Aqajan Khan | Aq Bolagh-e Rostam Khani | Aq Bulagh | Aq Daraq | Aq Daraq | Aq Divar | Aq Guni | Aq Qabaq-e Olya | Aq Qabaq-e Sofla | Aq Qabaq-e Vosta | Aq Qaleh | Aq Qaleh | Aq Qasemlu | Aqa Baqer | Aqa Beyglu | Aqa Hasan Beyglu | Aqa Mirlu | Aqa Mohammad Beyglu | Aqa Morad | Aqa Yarlu | Aqchay-e Olya | Aqchay-e Sofla | Aqchay-e Vosta | Aqcheh Kand | Aqchehlu | Aqdash-e Olya | Aqdash-e Sofla | Aqsu | Arablu Kandi | Arablu | Aralluy-e Bozorg | Aralluy-e Kuchek | Aranchi | Arbab Kandi | Ardabil | Ardabilaq | Ardi | Ardi Musa | Arjaq | Arjestan | Arkhazlu | Armarmshahadlu | Arpa Chai | Arpa Tappehsi | Arseh Dowgah | Arsun | Arvanaq | Arzanaq | Asad Kandi | Asad Qeshlaqi Shomareh-ye Seh | Asad Qeshlaqi-ye Do | Asad Qeshlaqi-ye Yek | Asadabad | Asb-e Marz | Asbu | Asfaranjan | Asghar Khanlu | Askestan | Aski Shahr | Aslan Duz | Asmarud | Asrabad | At Tutan | Atashgah | Atashgah-e Jadid | Ayaz Kandi | Ayuriq | Ayvazlu | Azadabad | Azadlu | Azhdarlu | Azimabad | Azizabad | Azizabad | Azizlu

=== B ===
Babak | Babi Kandi | Babian | Bafrajerd | Baghcheh Chiq | Bagheshlu Kandi | Bagheshlu | Bahramabad | Balakhan Kandi | Balil | Ballujeh Mirak | Balu Qayah | Balut Kandi | Banafsheh Daraq | Baqarabad | Baqerlu | Barandaq | Barezil | Baris | Barkchay | Baruq | Bashirlui-ye Olya | Bashirlui-ye Sofla | Bayram Badani | Beik Baghi | Belqeysabad | Benamaran | Beneh Lar | Beneh | Benmar-e Sabalan | Beris | Beyg Baghlu | Beyraq | Biaraq | Bijaq | Bil Dashi | Bilah Daraq | Bileh Daraq | Bileh Savar | Bolus | Boneh Khalkhal | Bonyadabad | Borjelu | Borjelu | Borran-e Olya | Borran-e Sofla | Borun Qeshlaq-e Olya | Borun Qeshlaq-e Sofla | Budalalu | Buran | Burestan | Burkabad | Busjin | Buyaqchilu | Buzcheh-ye Olya | Buzcheh-ye Sofla | Buzcheh-ye Vosta

=== C ===
Chaghungenesh | Chakhar Chamani | Chakhmaq Chukhur | Chalak | Chalambar | Chalgarud | Chalmeh Kandi | Chamlu Gabin | Chanaq-e Sofla va Olya | Chanbalu Qeshlaq | Chanzab | Chanzanaq | Chapaqan | Charapa | Charchelu | Charuq Dash | Chat Qayah | Chat Qeshlaq-e Bala | Chay Seqerlu | Chebenlu | Chehel Gaz | Chehreh Barq | Chenaq Bolagh | Chenaqrud | Chenar | Chenar | Chenar | Chenar | Chenarlaq | Cher Cher | Chuneh Khanlu | Chungenesh | Chunzeh-ye Olya | Chunzeh-ye Sofla | Chupan Qeshlaqi

=== D ===
Dabanlu | Dadeh Beyglu | Dagermandaraq | Dagh Kandi | Dagh Kandi-ye Olya | Dagmeh Daghildi | Dalik Yarqan | Dalikli Dash | Dalilu | Dam Qoli | Damdabaja | Damdol | Damirchi Darrehsi-ye Olya | Damirchi Darrehsi-ye Sofla | Damirchilu | Damirchi-ye Kharabahsi | Damirchi-ye Olya | Damirchi-ye Sofla | Danial | Darabad | Dargahlu | Darin Kabud | Darmanlu | Darreh Beyglu | Darreh Gahlui-ye Barzand | Darvish-e Gurnamaz | Daryaman | Dash Bolagh | Dash Bolagh | Dash Bolagh-e Barzand | Dash Bolaghi | Dash Bolaq Kandi | Dash Kasan | Dash Qapu | Dashdibi | Dashli Daraq | Dashlujeh | Dasht Andar | Dastgir | Davahchi-ye Olya | Davahchi-ye Sofla | Davil | Dayu Kandi | Delik Yarqan | Derow | Deylamabad | Dijujin | Dikdaraq | Dikdash | Dim Seqerlu | Diman | Divlaq | Diz | Diz | Dizaj | Domdomeh | Dovarjin | Dowgar | Dowlatabad | Dowlatabad | Dowlatabad | Dowshanlu | Dudaran | Duh Darrehsi | Dumuli | Dushan Bolaghi | Dust Beyglu | Dust Kandi

=== E ===
Eba Beyglu | Ebli-ye Olya | Ebli-ye Sofla | Ebrahim Kandi | Ebrahim Kandi | Ebrahim Kandi-ye Olya | Ebrahim Kandi-ye Sofla | Ebrahim Kandi-ye Vosta | Ebrahimabad-e Jadid | Edalat Qeshlaqi | Emarat | Emaratlui-ye Olya | Emamzadeh Seyyed Ebrahim | Eslam Kandi | Eslamabad | Eslamabad-e Jadid | Eslamabad-e Qadim | Eslamabad-e Sofla | Esmail Kandi | Esmail Kandi-ye Do | Esmail Kandi-ye Yek | Esmaili Kandi | Eynallah Kandi | Ezmareh-ye Olya | Ezmareh-ye Sofla

=== F ===
Fakhrabad | Farab | Farajabad | Farkhlu | Farzi Kandi | Fath-e Maqsud | Feshlaq Aghdash Hajji Saram | Firuzabad | Firuzabad | Firuzabad | Forudgah Ardabil | Fulad Luqui

=== G ===
Gachi Bolaghi-ye Sofla | Gadeh Kahriz | Galasan Gurasan | Galin Bolaghi | Galin Qeshlaqi | Gandomabad | Ganduz | Ganjgah | Garjan | Garm Cheshmeh | Garm Khaneh | Garmi Angut | Gavan | Gavar Qaleh | Gavdul | Gazir | Gazvar-e Olya | Gazvar-e Sofla | Gechi Qeshlaq Amirlu | Gechi Qeshlaq Hajj Mohammadlu | Gedaylu | Gelan Daraq-e Sofla | Gelgelab | Gellar-e Mohammad Hasan | Gellar-e Mohammad Taqi | Gendishmin | Genlujeh | Gerdeh Gol | Gerdeh | Germi | Gezaz | Ghaffar Kandi | Ghafurabad | Gharib Hajji | Gholam Hoseyn Kandi | Gigal | Gilan Deh | Gilanduz | Gilarlu | Gilavan | Gol Cheshmeh | Gol Moghan | Gol Qeshlaq | Gol Tappeh | Gol Tappeh | Gol Tappeh-ye Malali | Golestan | Goli Bolagh-e Olya | Goli Bolagh-e Sofla | Goli Daraq-e Olya | Goli Daraq-e Sofla | Goli Jan | Goli | Golli | Gollu | Golujeh | Golujeh | Golujeh | Gonsul Kandi | Gorgabad | Gowdah Kahriz | Gowdlar | Gowg Tappeh | Gowzalli | Gugarchin | Gugeh | Gun Papaq | Gun Papaq-e Olya | Guni Kand | Guni Kandi | Guradel | Guran Sarab | Gurdigol | Gurdigol-e Nur ed Din | Gurshad Kandi | Gushlu

=== H ===
Habash | Hachakand-e Darmanlu | Hachakand-e Tazeh | Hadi Beyglu | Hadilu | Haft Cheshmeh | Hajj Ahmad Kandi | Hajj Amir Kandi | Hajj Hasan Kandi | Hajji Abbas Kandi | Hajji Aqa Kandi | Hajji Aqam Ali Kandi | Hajji Baba Khan | Hajji Bala Beyglu | Hajji Esmail Iman Khan | Hajji Havar Kandi | Hajji Jafar Kandi | Hajji Mahmud | Hajji Morteza Kandi | Hajji Nowrush Kandi | Hajji Qadart Kandi | Hajji Seyflu | Hajji Siab Kandi | Hajjiabad | Hajjilu | Hakim Qeshlaqi | Hallajabad | Hamdollahabad | Hameh Shan | Hamidabad | Hamlabad | Hammamlu | Hamvar Kandi | Hamzah Khanlu | Haram | Hasan Baruq | Hasan Kandi | Hasan Khan Darrehsi | Hasanabad | Hasanali Kandi | Hasanlu | Hashatjin | Hava Daraq | Havar Kandi Qeshlaqi | Havas Kandi | Havashanq | Hefzabad | Helabad | Heris | Hesar | Heshi | Heshin | Heybat-e Jahan Khanemlu | Heybat-e Olya | Heybat-e Sofla | Heydarabad | Hezar Kandi | Hiq | Hir | Hizan | Hoseyn Khan Kandi | Hoseyn Khanlu | Hoseyn Qeshlaqi Gurabazlu | Hoseyn Qeshlaqi Hajj Khvajehlu | Hoshneh | Hur

=== I ===
Idir-e Olya | Idir-e Sofla | Ilat Zamin | Ilkhanlar | Ilkhchi | Ilkhchi | Ilkhchi-ye Olya | Ilkhchi-ye Sofla | Ilvanaq | Imir | Inallu | Incheh | Incheh | Iranabad | Irenji | Iril | Isti Baghcheh

=== J ===
Jabah Dar | Jabbarlu | Jabdaraq | Jabilu | Jablu | Jafarabad | Jafarabad | Jafarabad | Jafarlu | Jahan Khanamlu | Jahangirlu | Jalalabad | Jalayer | Jamadi | Jamalabad | Jamayran | Jamulu Kandi | Jamush Olan-e Olya | Jamush Olan-e Sofla | Jangan | Jebar Kandi | Jeda | Jegar Kandi | Jeqjeq-e Olya | Jeqjeq-e Vosta | Jeyd | Jiavan | Jin Kandi | Jin Qeshlaqi | Joghanab | Jolowgir | Jurab

=== K ===
Kabudchi | Kachal Daraq | Kachalar | Kadkhodalu | Kaftareh | Kahel Qeshlaq | Kahran | Kahriz | Kajal | Kalan | Kalanpa | Kalansura | Kalantar | Kalar | Kalash-e Bozorg | Kaleh Sar | Kalestan-e Olya | Kalestan-e Sofla | Kalhor | Kalkhuran | Kalkhuran Sheykh | Kalkhvoran-e Viyand | Kalleh Sar-e Olya | Kalleh Sar-e Sofla | Kamalabad | Kamar Qayah | Kamar | Kamiabad | Kampab Mantqehi Maghan | Kanchubeh | Kandeh Kandi | Kandovan | Kangarlu | Kanzaq | Karamlu | Karandaq | Kard Kandi | Kareh Nab | Kargan | Kargazlu | Karimlu | Karin | Karkaraq | Karkasheh | Karnaq | Kavich | Kazaj | Kazemabad | Kazemlu | Kehel | Keheldasht | Kejin | Keleh Daraq | Kenazaq | Keram Kandi | Keriq | Keriq-e Bozorg | Khademlu | Khakriz | Khalaj | Khalfehlu | Khalifeh Davud | Khalifehlu Kandi-ye Bozorg | Khalifehlu | Khalifehlu | Khalil Kandi | Khalilabad | Khalkhal | Khames | Khan Baba Kandi | Khan Bolaghi | Khan Kandi | Khan Kandi | Khan Mohammadlu | Khan Qeshlaqi | Khan Qeshlaqi-ye Yek | Khanali Darrehsi | Khaneh Shir | Khaneqah | Khaneqah-e Bafrajerd | Khaneqah-e Gilavan | Khaneqah-e Olya | Khaneqah-e Sadat | Khaneqah-e Sofla | Khani Babalu | Khanjar | Khankandi | Khanlar Qeshlaqi Hajj Bala Beyglu | Khanlar Qeshlaqi-ye Hajj Alam Qoli | Khanom Alilu | Khanom Bala Kandi | Kharabeh Razi | Kharabeh-ye Kohal | Kharabeh-ye Qaderlu | Khasheh Heyran | Khat Parast | Khiarak | Khodaqoli Qeshlaq | Khoraim | Khordeh Qeshlaq | Khorramabad | Khoshkeh Rud | Khujin | Khush Nameh | Khvajeh Bolaghi | Khvajehim | Khvor Khvor-e Olya | Khvorshidabad | Khvoshabad | Kinu | Kivi, Iran | Kivi | Kohneh Kand | Kol Tappeh | Koleh Digeh | Koli | Koli-ye Olya | Koli-ye Sofla | Kolleh Sar | Kolosh | Kolowr | Kolur | Komoq | Kord Kandi | Kord Lar | Kord Qeshlaqi | Kordali | Kordeh Deh | Kuh Kenar | Kuhsareh | Kujanaq | Kulan Kuh | Kulatan | Kur Abbaslu | Kur Bolagh | Kuraim | Kuramalu | Kurlar | Kut Tappeh | Kuzah Topraqi

=== L ===
Lachin Darrehsi | Lahrud | Lajayer | Lakandasht | Lakarabad-e Olya | Lakarabad-e Sofla | Lal Ganj | Laleh Bolaghi | Lameh Dasht | Lanjabad | Laskeh Daraq | Lataran | Lay | Lehaq | Lekvan | Lengehbiz | Lerd | Limlu | Lombar | Lonbar | Lorun | Luleh Daraq-e Hajj Najaf

=== M ===
Mahbub Kandi | Mahmudabad | Mahmudabad | Mahmudabad | Mahmudabad | Mahmudabad-e Taleqani | Majandeh | Majareh | Majdar | Majidabad | Majidabad | Majidlu | Majulan | Malqeshlaqi | Manamin | Mansurlu | Maqsudlu-ye Olya | Maqsudlu-ye Sofla | Maqsudlu-ye Vosta | Marallui-ye Kalbalu | Marallu-ye Jafarqoli Khanlu | Marani | Mardan | Mashhadlu | Mashiran | Mashkul | Masjed-e Mahalleh | Masjedlu | Masjedlu | Masjedlu | Mastanabad | Masumabad | Mayeh Darrahsi | Mazafa | Mehdi Khanlu | Mehdi Posti | Mehmandust-e Olya | Mehmandust-e Sofla | Mejmir | Melli Kandi | Meresht | Mesdaraq | Meshginshahr | Meykhvosh | Meymand | Mezajin | Mian Rudan | Mijandi | Mikail Darrehsi | Mikailabad | Mil Aghardan | Minabad | Mir Alilu | Mir Hoseynlu | Mir Jafarlu | Mir Kandi | Mir Qahremanlu | Mirahjin | Mirani | Mirverdi Kandi | Mirza Hasan Kandi | Mirza Rahimlu | Mirzanaq | Mizan | Moghvan | Mohamandust-e Olya | Mohammad Janlu | Mohammad Qoli Beyglu | Mohammad Taqi Kandi | Mohammadlu | Mohreh | Mokhtarabad | Molla Ahmad | Molla Bashi | Molla Kandi | Molla Yusef | Mollalu | Mollalu | Morad Ali Kandi | Moradlu | Moradlu | Moshtaqin | Mostafalu | Movil | Mowlan-e Olya | Mowlan-e Sofla | Murestan

=== N ===
Najaf Qoli Qeshlaqi | Namin | Naneh Karan | Naqareh | Naqdi Kandi | Naqdi-ye Olya | Naqdi-ye Sofla | Nar Qeshlaqi | Nariman | Narlu | Nasir Kandi | Nasir Kandi | Nasirabad | Nasirabad | Nasrabad | Nasrollah Beyglu | Natur | Navand | Navashanaq | Nazar Ali Bolaghi | Nazar Ali Kandi | Nemahil | Nesaz | Ney Ahmad Beyg | Nia Khorram | Niar | Niaraq | Niaz Sui | Niazqoli | Nilaq | Nir | Novashnaq | Now Deh | Now Deh | Now Shahr | Nowdeh | Nowjeh Deh | Nowlu | Nuli Bolagh | Nur Mohammad Kandi-ye Olya | Nur Mohammad Kandi-ye Sofla | Nur Mohammad Kandi-ye Vosta | Nuran | Nurollah Beyglu

=== O ===
Ojaq Alazar | Ojaq Qeshlaq-e Khoruslu | Ojaq Qeshlaqi | Ojaq Qoli Kandi | Oli Kandi | Olkash | Olmai-ye Olya | Olmai-ye Sofla | Omidcheh | Omidcheh | Ommabad | Omranabad | Onar | Ordukhan Kandi | Oruj Alilu | Oruj Qeshlaq-e Hajj Almas Khan | Oruj Qeshlaq-e Hajj Esmail | Oruj Qeshlaq-e Hajj Omran | Oruj Qeshlaq-e Morad | Orujabad | Owch Aghaj | Owch Bolagh | Owch Bolagh | Owch Bolagh | Owch Bolagh | Owch Darreh-ye Moghanlu Ogham Ali | Owchghaz-e Olya | Owchghaz-e Sofla | Owdlu | Owjur | Owlaghan | Owltan | Own Bir Beyglu | Owranj | Owrta Qeshlaq | Owzan Bolagh | Owzun Qui-ye Do | Owzun Qui-ye Yek

=== P ===
Palanglu | Panjeh Ali Kharabehsi | Para Qeshlaq | Para Qeshlaq-e Olya | Para Qeshlaq-e Sofla | Parchin | Parchin-e Olya | Parchin-e Sofla | Pardastlu | Pargu | Parikhan | Parsabad | Pashalu | Pateh Khvor | Peruj | Petelqan | Petli Kand | Pichsun | Pilah Galin | Pileh Daraq | Pileh Sehran | Pir Aghaj | Pir Alilu | Pir Alqar | Pir Alvan | Pir Aquam | Pir Bodagh | Pir Javar | Pir Zaman | Pirayuvatlu | Pirazmeyan | Pireh Khalil | Pirlu | Pirnaq | Pirzadeh | Pishgaman | Pormehr | Post Kandi | Pugeh-ye Guni Dagh

=== Q ===
Qabaleh Kandi | Qaderlu | Qahramanlu | Qaleh Barzand | Qaleh Juq | Qaleh Juq | Qaleh Juq-e Sabalan | Qaleh | Qalin Qayah | Qanbarlu | Qanlu Bolagh | Qar Qeshlaqi | Qarah Aghaj Poshteh | Qarah Aghaj | Qarah Aghaj-e Bala | Qarah Aghaj-e Pain | Qarah Baghlar | Qarah Bolagh | Qarah Chanaq | Qarah Daghlu | Qarah Gol | Qarah Gol | Qarah Hasanlu | Qarah Khan Beyglu | Qarah Qasemlu | Qarah Qayah | Qarah Qeshlaq | Qarah Qeshlaq | Qarah Quch | Qarah Saqqal-e Sofla | Qarah Shiran | Qarah Takanlu | Qarah Tappeh | Qarah Tappeh | Qarah Tappeh-ye Sabalan | Qarah Vali | Qarah Valilu | Qarah Yataq | Qarahchi-ye Olya | Qarahchi-ye Sofla | Qarahjah Aghle | Qarahlar | Qarahlu | Qarakh Bolagh | Qarash Qa Tappehsi-ye Olya | Qarash Qa Tappehsi-ye Sofla | Qaravaghli Ayibi | Qareh Malham | Qareh Qabaq-e Olya | Qareh Qabaq-e Sofla | Qareh Tekan | Qari Mazraehsi | Qasem Kandi | Qasem Kandi | Qasem Qeshlaqi | Qasem Qeshlaqi | Qashqa Qeshlaq-e Hajj Akbar | Qatarabad | Qatar-e Olya | Qatar-e Sofla | Qater Yuran-e Olya | Qater Yuran-e Sofla | Qayah Qeshlaqi | Qayeh Chaman | Qelich Khan Kandi | Qelich Khanlu | Qelich Qeshlaqi | Qelichi | Qerkh Bolagh | Qeshlaq Aghdash-e Bahram | Qeshlaq Aghdash-e Beyglar | Qeshlaq Aghdash-e Hasan Hazi Owghli | Qeshlaq Aghdash-e Mahmud | Qeshlaq Aghdash-e Nasir | Qeshlaq Amir Khanlu-ye Hajji Shakar | Qeshlaq Amir Khanlu-ye Hajji Tapduq | Qeshlaq Amir Khanlu-ye Moharramabad | Qeshlaq Amir Khanlu-ye Pol-e Rahman | Qeshlaq Amir Khanlu-ye Qarah Saqqal | Qeshlaq Chay | Qeshlaq | Qeshlaq-e Aba | Qeshlaq-e Aghjaran | Qeshlaq-e Ahmadi | Qeshlaq-e Aji Eshmeh-ye Ali Heydar Beyg | Qeshlaq-e Aji Eshmeh-ye Nurahmad | Qeshlaq-e Aji Eshmeh-ye Papur | Qeshlaq-e Alapapakh | Qeshlaq-e Ali Akbar Hamzeh | Qeshlaq-e Ali Karimi | Qeshlaq-e Ali Shansuyi | Qeshlaq-e Ali Shobani | Qeshlaq-e Alish | Qeshlaq-e Aq Borun | Qeshlaq-e Aqa Baba | Qeshlaq-e Aqa Khan-e Ekhtiar | Qeshlaq-e Arablu Asrafil | Qeshlaq-e Ayan Ali Barat | Qeshlaq-e Ayan Ali Samad | Qeshlaq-e Ayaq Ayiri Hajj Mohammad Ali | Qeshlaq-e Ayiri Darreh Hajj Chapar | Qeshlaq-e Ayiri Darreh Hajj Mahbat | Qeshlaq-e Ayyub Gikalu | Qeshlaq-e Azat | Qeshlaq-e Babakhan | Qeshlaq-e Babash-e Olya | Qeshlaq-e Babash-e Sofla | Qeshlaq-e Badeyr | Qeshlaq-e Bahman Shir | Qeshlaq-e Bakhshali | Qeshlaq-e Bakhtiar | Qeshlaq-e Balaja | Qeshlaq-e Baqersoli Ali Sahami | Qeshlaq-e Baqersoli Hajj Khan Ali | Qeshlaq-e Baqersoli Satar | Qeshlaq-e Barian | Qeshlaq-e Beyg Ali-ye Olya | Qeshlaq-e Beyg Ali-ye Sofla | Qeshlaq-e Beyg Ali-ye Vosta | Qeshlaq-e Buzcheh-ye Olya | Qeshlaq-e Buzcheh-ye Sofla-e Yek | Qeshlaq-e Chatameh Gholam | Qeshlaq-e Chenar | Qeshlaq-e Chortaqlu | Qeshlaq-e Chukhli Quyi Bahadruhamat | Qeshlaq-e Chukhli Quyi Hajj Akbar | Qeshlaq-e Chukhli Quyi Hajj Hasan Akhteri | Qeshlaq-e Chukhli Quyi Hajj Hasan Ali | Qeshlaq-e Chukhli Quyi Hajj Ramazan | Qeshlaq-e Chukhli Quyi Hoseyn Aq Bashlar | Qeshlaq-e Chukhli Quyi Khodash | Qeshlaq-e Damirchluy-e Qarah Qeshlaq Hajj Abil | Qeshlaq-e Damirchluy-e Qarah Qeshlaq-e Hajj Majid | Qeshlaq-e Diz | Qeshlaq-e Dowlama | Qeshlaq-e Eslamabad-e Shomareh-ye Do | Qeshlaq-e Eslamabad-e Shomareh-ye Seh | Qeshlaq-e Esmail Khan Jalil Ranjaber | Qeshlaq-e Esmail Khan Mohammad Izadi | Qeshlaq-e Faraj Esmail | Qeshlaq-e Faraj Hajj Owraj | Qeshlaq-e Faraj Moharram | Qeshlaq-e Farajollah Hajj Sarkhan | Qeshlaq-e Farajollah Nemaz | Qeshlaq-e Farajollah Qadir | Qeshlaq-e Gablu | Qeshlaq-e Gadilu | Qeshlaq-e Galam Ali Hajj Hoseyn | Qeshlaq-e Galam Ali Hajj Savad | Qeshlaq-e Galam Ali Safar | Qeshlaq-e Ghazanfar-e Bala | Qeshlaq-e Gilvan | Qeshlaq-e Gowmir Chinlu-ye Owrtadagh | Qeshlaq-e Guneshli | Qeshlaq-e Gurchinlu Hajj Beyuk | Qeshlaq-e Gurchinlu Hajj Najaf | Qeshlaq-e Hadli | Qeshlaq-e Hajj Abish Hajj Mosum | Qeshlaq-e Hajj Ali Barat | Qeshlaq-e Hajj Ali Qoli Abdol | Qeshlaq-e Hajj Ali Qoli Ayaz | Qeshlaq-e Hajj Ali Qoli Jafar | Qeshlaq-e Hajj Ali Qoli Jelal va Khan Aqa | Qeshlaq-e Hajj Almas Khan | Qeshlaq-e Hajj Aman | Qeshlaq-e Hajj Amir Forman | Qeshlaq-e Hajj Amir Maherem | Qeshlaq-e Hajj Amir Mashhadi Safer | Qeshlaq-e Hajj Aqa Nasir Owgholu | Qeshlaq-e Hajj Aqaqoli | Qeshlaq-e Hajj Aspar Kandi | Qeshlaq-e Hajj Aymanlu Mahteman | Qeshlaq-e Hajj Dalan Khan Hoseyn Khodayar | Qeshlaq-e Hajj Dowlat Ahmad | Qeshlaq-e Hajj Dowlat Savad | Qeshlaq-e Hajj Dowlat Yadollah | Qeshlaq-e Hajj Fathali | Qeshlaq-e Hajj Fathali Mansur | Qeshlaq-e Hajj Hashem Arshad | Qeshlaq-e Hajj Hashem-e Neysar | Qeshlaq-e Hajj Heydar Farman | Qeshlaq-e Hajj Heydar Gol Ahmad | Qeshlaq-e Hajj Hoseyn Khan | Qeshlaq-e Hajj Khan Hoseyn Samid | Qeshlaq-e Hajj Mahmud | Qeshlaq-e Hajj Shirin Mosib | Qeshlaq-e Hajj Soleyman Akbar Keramati | Qeshlaq-e Hajj Soleyman-e Ali Goshad Teymuri | Qeshlaq-e Hajj Taleb | Qeshlaq-e Hajj Tumar Hajj Jamshid Shahbazi | Qeshlaq-e Hajji Abbas | Qeshlaq-e Hajji Abish Hajj Rahim | Qeshlaq-e Hajji Allahverdi | Qeshlaq-e Hajji Avaz | Qeshlaq-e Hajji Ayman Kandi-ye Olya | Qeshlaq-e Hajji Balakhan | Qeshlaq-e Hajji Bayandar | Qeshlaq-e Hajji Dowlat Badar | Qeshlaq-e Hajji Gholam | Qeshlaq-e Hajji Hasan Hajj Eslam | Qeshlaq-e Hajji Hasan | Qeshlaq-e Hajji Heydar Havar | Qeshlaq-e Hajji Nasi | Qeshlaq-e Hajji Panjalu | Qeshlaq-e Hajji Qujakhan | Qeshlaq-e Hajji Samid | Qeshlaq-e Hajji Savad | Qeshlaq-e Hajji Siab | Qeshlaq-e Hatem | Qeshlaq-e Hezarat Qoli Abdollah | Qeshlaq-e Hezarat Qoli Abu ol Hasan | Qeshlaq-e Hezarat Qoli Bakhtiar | Qeshlaq-e Hezarat Qoli Gholam | Qeshlaq-e Hoseyn Narimani | Qeshlaq-e Ilkhchi-ye Olya | Qeshlaq-e Ilkhchi-ye Sofla | Qeshlaq-e Iman Quyi Mashhad Ali | Qeshlaq-e Iman Quyi Mohammad Jalili | Qeshlaq-e Jafar Qoli | Qeshlaq-e Jahan Khanemlu | Qeshlaq-e Jalilu | Qeshlaq-e Jeda | Qeshlaq-e Kazem Owghlan | Qeshlaq-e Kazem Owghlan Asghar | Qeshlaq-e Khalillu Aziz | Qeshlaq-e Khalillu Gholam | Qeshlaq-e Khalilu Heydar | Qeshlaq-e Khan Goldi Bala Owghlan | Qeshlaq-e Khan Goldi Davakishi | Qeshlaq-e Khan Goldi Hajj Ahmad | Qeshlaq-e Khan Goldi Kamaran | Qeshlaq-e Khan Goldi Mostanlu | Qeshlaq-e Khan Goldi Ogham Owghlan | Qeshlaq-e Khan Hoseyn Vadelan Hajj Mohammad Taqi | Qeshlaq-e Khan Hoseyn Vadelan Teymur | Qeshlaq-e Khan Owghlan | Qeshlaq-e Luleh Darreh Hajji Hasan | Qeshlaq-e Luleh Darreh Jamshid | Qeshlaq-e Malek Kandi | Qeshlaq-e Mazan-e Olya | Qeshlaq-e Mehr Ali Kandi | Qeshlaq-e Melli Hajji Hamat | Qeshlaq-e Melli Mahmudlar | Qeshlaq-e Mira Alam | Qeshlaq-e Mohammad Beyg-e Olya | Qeshlaq-e Mohammad Beyg-e Sofla | Qeshlaq-e Mohammad Qoli | Qeshlaq-e Molla Naqi Aqam Owghlan | Qeshlaq-e Molla Naqi Qanbar | Qeshlaq-e Muzuhlar | Qeshlaq-e Nariman Kandi Amir Aslan | Qeshlaq-e Nariman Kandi Hajj Khan Owghlan | Qeshlaq-e Nariman Kandi Hajji Havar | Qeshlaq-e Ojaq-e Yek | Qeshlaq-e Olya | Qeshlaq-e Owch Ali Savad | Qeshlaq-e Owch Ali Shahamati | Qeshlaq-e Owch Bolagh | Qeshlaq-e Owch Bolaq | Qeshlaq-e Owch Darreh al Tafat | Qeshlaq-e Owch Quyi Ali Akbar | Qeshlaq-e Owch Quyi Hajj Hasan Shayiqi | Qeshlaq-e Owrtadagh-e Esmail | Qeshlaq-e Owrtadagh-e Hajjiabad | Qeshlaq-e Owrtadagh-e Tapaduq | Qeshlaq-e Padar Eys Khan | Qeshlaq-e Padar Hajji Bahrish | Qeshlaq-e Padarjamal | Qeshlaq-e Pasha | Qeshlaq-e Pelazir | Qeshlaq-e Qabaleh Gah Abbas Ali | Qeshlaq-e Qabaleh Gah Ali Aslan | Qeshlaq-e Qabaleh Gah Allah Vardi va Paper | Qeshlaq-e Qabaleh Gah Gol Aslan | Qeshlaq-e Qaharmanlu | Qeshlaq-e Qahreman | Qeshlaq-e Qanbarlu Hajj Mohammad Hasan | Qeshlaq-e Qanbarlu Rostam Qanbarlui-ye Vosta | Qeshlaq-e Qanbarlui-ye Olya | Qeshlaq-e Qarah Darreh-ye Asam Khan Asad | Qeshlaq-e Qarah Darreh-ye Asam Khan Azadkhan | Qeshlaq-e Qarah Darreh-ye Asam Khan Hajj Sadallah | Qeshlaq-e Qarah Darreh-ye Asam Khan Kishi | Qeshlaq-e Qarah Darreh-ye Asam Khan Safar Kandi | Qeshlaq-e Qarah Darreh-ye Asam Khan Tahraj | Qeshlaq-e Qarah Darreh-ye Aziz Rostam | Qeshlaq-e Qarah Darreh-ye Hajji Alish | Qeshlaq-e Qarah Darreh-ye Kahel Qeshlaq Farasat | Qeshlaq-e Qarah Darreh-ye Kahel va Qeshlaq-e Hajji Shahverdi | Qeshlaq-e Qarah Jalu Hajji Iman | Qeshlaq-e Qarah Jalu Hajji Sadeq | Qeshlaq-e Qarah Kakil Ayaz | Qeshlaq-e Qarah Kakil Hajji Mahmud | Qeshlaq-e Qarah Kakil Matleb | Qeshlaq-e Qarah Qayeh | Qeshlaq-e Qarah Takanlu Amrollah | Qeshlaq-e Qarah Tappeh Maleklar | Qeshlaq-e Qarah Tappeh Tamaq Ali | Qeshlaq-e Qaravgholi Jabar | Qeshlaq-e Qareh Seqal | Qeshlaq-e Qarqoli Rahim Talbi | Qeshlaq-e Qirlu | Qeshlaq-e Qitranlu Hajj Mohammad Kandi | Qeshlaq-e Quja Hajji Khosrow | Qeshlaq-e Quzlu | Qeshlaq-e Rostam | Qeshlaq-e Sadi Kandi | Qeshlaq-e Safar Ali Ghib Ali | Qeshlaq-e Safar Ali Nosrat | Qeshlaq-e Salman va Alman | Qeshlaq-e Sarabad | Qeshlaq-e Sari Quyi Ahmad Khan | Qeshlaq-e Sari Quyi Mikail | Qeshlaq-e Sari Quyi Shahmar | Qeshlaq-e Sarudlu Kandi | Qeshlaq-e Seyf Khanlu-ye Do | Qeshlaq-e Seyf Khanlu-ye Yek | Qeshlaq-e Seyyedlar Dadalu Hoseyn Ali | Qeshlaq-e Seyyedlar Dadalu Yidallah | Qeshlaq-e Seyyedlar Sari Quyi Hajj Bayram | Qeshlaq-e Seyyedlar-e Seyfollah | Qeshlaq-e Seyyedlari Sari Quyi Moradlu | Qeshlaq-e Shah Khanem Ali Borat | Qeshlaq-e Shah Khanem Qadir | Qeshlaq-e Sufi Hasan | Qeshlaq-e Sufi Qadir | Qeshlaq-e Sufilar Hajj Mirza Ali Aqa | Qeshlaq-e Sufilar Hamid | Qeshlaq-e Sumuklu Heydar | Qeshlaq-e Sumuklu Mayir | Qeshlaq-e Tak Quyi Matlab va Ali Khan | Qeshlaq-e Tak Quyi Qarah Piran | Qeshlaq-e Takqui-ye Qarah Piran-e Hazrat-e Qoli | Qeshlaq-e Tang | Qeshlaq-e Tarrehchi | Qeshlaq-e Tulkilu Gol Moradi | Qeshlaq-e Tulkilu Gujehlar | Qeshlaq-e Tumar | Qeshlaq-e Tumar Hajj Sad | Qeshlaq-e Yilatan Hajj Abbas | Qeshlaq-e Yilatan ol Hurdi Dowlat | Qeshlaq-e Zaviyeh | Qeshlaq-e Zeynal-e Olya | Qezel Daraq | Qezel Guney | Qezel Qayah | Qilpenlu-ye Olya | Qilpenlu-ye Sofla | Qilulu | Qinarjeh | Qitranlu Soltani | Qiz Qalehsi | Qobad Kandi | Qoli Beyglu | Qonan Qaran | Qorbanlu | Qosabeh | Qowsheh-ye Olya | Qowsheh-ye Sofla | Quja Beyglu | Quldur Kohli | Quri Daraq | Qurlu | Qurt Tappeh | Qurt Tappeh | Qurtlu Qeshlaq | Qurtulmush | Qusajin | Qusha Qeshlaq-e Hasan | Qusha Qeshlaq-e Khasai | Qusha Qeshlaq-e Mansur va Rahman | Qusha Qeshlaq-e Qambai | Qusha Qeshlaq-e Rezali Beyg | Qutur Bolagh | Quytul | Quzlu | Quzlu | Quzlu

=== R ===
Rahim Beyglui-ye Olya | Rahim Beyglui-ye Sofla | Rahim Kandi | Rahimlu | Rahimlui-ye Muran | Ravindazaq | Raz | Razamgah | Razi | Raziabad | Rezaqoli-ye Qeshlaqi | Rostamabad | Rowshanaq | Ruh Kandi

=== S ===
Saadat Bolaghi | Sachlu | Saghirlu | Saheb Divan | Said Khanlu | Saidabad | Sain | Sain | Salaleh | Salavat | Saleh Qeshlaqi | Salman Kandi | Salmanabad | Saluk Qeshlaqi | Samadlu | Samanlui-ye Bozorg | Samarin | Samian | Sangabad | Saqqavaz | Saqqezchi | Saqqezchi | Saqsolu | Sarband | Sarbanlar | Sardabeh | Sardi | Sareyn | Sari Bolagh | Sari Daraq | Sari Nasirlu | Sari Qayah | Sari Qeshlaq | Sarikhanlu | Sarilar | Sarkhai Beyglu | Sarvaghaji | Sati-ye Olya | Sati-ye Sofla | Sati-ye Vosta | Savareh | Savoj Bolagh | Savojbolagh | Sayadabad | Sefid Ab | Sejahrud | Sekarabad | Seqdel | Seqizchi | Seyf Khanlu | Seyfabad | Seyyed Beyglu | Seyyed Javadlu | Seyyed Kandi | Seyyed Kandi | Seyyed Lar | Seyyed Mohammadlu | Seyyedabad | Seyyedlar-e Zahra | Shabanlu | Shabanlu | Shabi Kandi | Shablu | Shaerlu | Shahab ol Din | Shahbazlu | Shahid Mohammadpur | Shahmar Beyglu | Shahrak-e Gharbi | Shahrak-e Vali Asr | Shahrivar | Shahsavarlu | Shakar Ab | Shal | Sham Asbi | Shamsabad | Shamsabad | Shamsabad | Shamsabad | Shamshir Khani | Shamsir | Sharafabad | Sharafeh | Sharajabad | Sharif Beyglu | Shater Gonbadi | Shavir | Shavon-e Olya | Shavon-e Sofla | Shayeq | Shekarlui-ye Olya | Shender Shami | Sheykh Ahmad | Sheykh Alilar | Sheykh Azimlu | Sheykh Mohammadlu | Sheykh Razi | Sheykhlar | Sheykhlu | Shilveh-ye Olya | Shilveh-ye Sofla | Shiran | Shirin Bolagh | Shisheh Garan | Shur Bolagh | Shur Daraq-e Olya | Shur Daraq-e Sofla | Shur Gol | Shurestan | Shurgol | Shurqui | Shush Bolagh | Siah Push | Siah | Siavosh Kandi | Sineh Sar | Sobhanlu | Sohrababad | Sohrablu | Soltan Qeshlaqi | Soltanabad | Solut | Somokluy-e Olya | Somokluy-e Sofla | Sorkhab | Sorkhanlu | Sowghanlu | Sowmaeh | Sowmeeh-ye Rudbar | Suflu | Suha | Sula | Suli Daraq | Sulugoli Gol | Suran | Sureh Barq | Susahab

=== T ===
Tabrizaq | Taharom Dasht | Tahmasebabad | Taj Boyuk | Tajaraq | Tak Bolagh Angut | Tak Bolagh-e Arshaq | Tak Dam | Tak Dam | Takah Chi | Takahchi | Takanlu | Takleh-ye Abbasabad-e Olya | Takleh-ye Abbasabad-e Sofla | Takleh-ye Bakhsh-e Do | Takleh-ye Bakhsh-e Yek | Taleb Qeshlaqi | Talkan | Tamerdash | Tang | Tapalqa | Tappeh Bashi | Tappeh | Tappeh | Taqcheh Dash | Taqi Dizaj | Taqi Kandi | Taqi Kandi | Tarazuj | Tarbat Kandi | Tarhamabad | Tark | Tarkeh Deh | Tarzanaq | Tavus Darrehsi | Tazeh Kand Gandomabad | Tazeh Kand | Tazeh Kand-e Angut | Tazeh Kand-e Galvazan | Tazeh Kand-e Hajji Khan | Tazeh Kand-e Jadid | Tazeh Kand-e Kian | Tazeh Kand-e Langan | Tazeh Kand-e Loqmanabad | Tazeh Kand-e Mohammadiyeh | Tazeh Kand-e Muran | Tazeh Kand-e Qadim | Tazeh Kand-e Qarah Bolagh | Tazeh Kand-e Rezaabad | Tazeh Kand-e Sabalan | Tazeh Kand-e Sharifabad | Tazeh Kand-e Yuzbashi | Tazeh Qeshlaq | Tazehabad | Tazehabad-e Tumar | Tazehkand-e Chenaq | Tighiyeh | Til | Timur Kandi | Tobnaq | Topraqlu | Towlash | Tulan | Tulir | Tulun | Tumar Darrahsi-ye Olya | Tumar Darrahsi-ye Sofla | Tumar Kandi | Tumaraqa Khan | Tupraq Kandi | Tusanlui-ye Barzand | Tushmanlu | Tutunsez | Tuyestan

=== U ===
Ucheh | Umaslan-e Olya | Umaslan-e Sofla | Ur | Urtlu | Uzun Tappeh-ye Olya | Uzun Tappeh-ye Sofla

=== V ===
Vakilabad | Vali Asr | Vali Beyglu | Vali Mamilu | Valiabad | Vanan | Van-e Olya | Van-e Sofla | Vanestanaq | Vareh Now | Varesabad | Vargeh Saran | Varniab | Vechin | Virseq | Viu | Viyand-e Kalkhvoran | Viz Darreh

=== Y ===
Yajlu | Yal Dagarmani | Yamchi-ye Olya | Yamchi-ye Sofla | Yan Bolagh | Yaychi | Yedi Daraq | Yekvan | Yelsui | Yelujeh | Yengejeh | Yengejeh | Yengejeh-ye Molla Mohammad Hasan | Yengejeh-ye Molla Mohammad Reza | Yengejeh-ye Qeshlaq | Yengejeh-ye Reza Beyglu | Yeznabad | Yunjalu | Yusefkhan Kandi | Yuzbash Mahallehsi | Yuznab

=== Z ===
Zahra | Zakilu | Zal Qoli Kandi | Zangebar | Zardalu | Zareabad | Zargar | Zargar-e Goli Bolaghi | Zarjabad | Zartoshtabad | Zaviyeh Sang | Zaviyeh-ye Jafarabad | Zaviyeh-ye Kivi | Zaviyeh-ye Kord | Zaviyeh-ye Sadat | Zaviyeh-ye Zarjabad | Zenab | Zengir | Zir Zamin | Ziveh | Zola Khuni
