= Qeshlaq-e Seyyedlar =

Qeshlaq-e Seyyedlar or Qeshlaq-e Seyyedlar (Persian: قشلاق سيدلر) may refer to various places in Iran:

- Qeshlaq-e Seyyedlar Dadalu Hoseyn Ali
- Qeshlaq-e Seyyedlar Dadalu Yidallah
- Qeshlaq-e Seyyedlar Sari Quyi Hajj Bayram
- Qeshlaq-e Seyyedlar-e Seyfollah
- Qeshlaq-e Seyyedlari Sari Quyi Moradlu
