= Qeshlaq-e Hezarat Qoli =

Qeshlaq-e Hezarat Qoli (Persian: قشلاق حضرت قلي) may refer to:

- Qeshlaq-e Hezarat Qoli Abdollah
- Qeshlaq-e Hezarat Qoli Abu ol Hasan
- Qeshlaq-e Hezarat Qoli Bakhtiar
- Qeshlaq-e Hezarat Qoli Gholam
