= Qeshlaq-e Faraj =

Qeshlaq-e Faraj (Persian: قشلاق فرج) may refer to:

- Qeshlaq-e Faraj Esmail
- Qeshlaq-e Faraj Hajj Owraj
- Qeshlaq-e Faraj Moharram
