= Qeshlaq-e Qarah Kakil =

Qeshlaq-e Qarah Kakil (Persian: قشلاق قره ككيل) may refer to:

- Qeshlaq-e Qarah Kakil Ayaz
- Qeshlaq-e Qarah Kakil Hajji Mahmud
- Qeshlaq-e Qarah Kakil Matleb
