= Qeshlaq-e Owrtadagh =

Qeshlaq-e Owrtadagh (Persian: قشلاق اورتاداغ) may refer to:

- Qeshlaq-e Owrtadagh-e Esmail
- Qeshlaq-e Owrtadagh-e Hajjiabad
- Qeshlaq-e Owrtadagh-e Tapaduq
