= Qeshlaq-e Aji Eshmeh =

Qeshlaq-e Aji Eshmeh (Persian: قشلاق اجي اشمه) may refer to:

- Qeshlaq-e Aji Eshmeh-ye Ali Heydar Beyg
- Qeshlaq-e Aji Eshmeh-ye Mohandas Sadeqi
- Qeshlaq-e Aji Eshmeh-ye Nurahmad
- Qeshlaq-e Aji Eshmeh-ye Papur
