= Qeshlaq-e Melli =

Qeshlaq-e Melli (Persian: قشلاق ملي) may refer to:

- Qeshlaq-e Melli Hajji Hamat
- Qeshlaq-e Melli Mahmudlar
