= Qeshlaq-e Yilatan =

Qeshlaq-e Yilatan (Persian: قشلاق یل اتان) may refer to:

- Qeshlaq-e Yilatan Hajj Abbas
- Qeshlaq-e Yilatan ol Hurdi Dowlat
