= Limlu =

Limlu (Persian: ليملو) may refer to:

- Limlu, Ardabil
- Limlu, East Azerbaijan
