= Qeshlaq-e Gurchinlu =

Qeshlaq-e Gurchinlu (Persian: قشلاق گورچينلو) may refer to:

- Qeshlaq-e Gurchinlu Hajj Beyuk
- Qeshlaq-e Gurchinlu Hajj Najaf
