= Qeshlaq-e Ayan Ali =

Qeshlaq-e Ayan Ali (Persian: قشلاق اينالي) may refer to:

- Qeshlaq-e Ayan Ali Barat
- Qeshlaq-e Ayan Ali Samad
