= Qeshlaq-e Damirchluy-e Qarah Qeshlaq =

Qeshlaq-e Damirchluy-e Qarah Qeshlaq (Persian: قشلاق دميرچلوي قره قشلاق) may refer to:

- Qeshlaq-e Damirchluy-e Qarah Qeshlaq Hajj Abil
- Qeshlaq-e Damirchluy-e Qarah Qeshlaq-e Hajj Majid
