= Shurgol =

Shurgol or Shur Gol or Shur Gel or Shoor Gel (Persian: شورگل) may refer to:

- Shur Gol, Bileh Savar, Ardabil Province
- Shurgol, Meshgin Shahr, Ardabil Province
- Shurgol, East Azerbaijan
- Shur Gel, West Azerbaijan
