= Azadabad =

Azadabad (Persian: آزادآباد) may refer to:

- Azadabad, Ardabil
- Azadabad, Meshgin Shahr, Ardabil Province
- Azadabad, Lorestan
- Azadabad, Zanjan
