= Dash Bolagh, Bileh Savar =

Village in Ardabil province, Iran

Dash Bolagh Persian: داشبلاغ
- Village
- Location within Iran
- Coordinates: 39°11′40″N 47°50′37″E
- Country: Iran
- Province: Ardabil
- County: Bileh Savar
- District: Qeshlaq Dasht
- Rural District: Qeshlaq-e Jonubi

Population (2016)
  - Total: 12
- Time zone: UTC+3:30 (IRST)

Dash Bolagh (Persian: داشبلاغ) is a village in Qeshlaq-e Jonubi Rural District of Qeshlaq Dasht District in Bileh Savar County, Ardabil province, Iran.

== Demographics ==
=== Population ===
At the time of the 2006 National Census, the village's population was below the reporting threshold. The following census in 2011 counted 16 people in four households. The 2016 census measured the population of the village as 12 people in five households.
