= Qeshlaq-e Jonubi Rural District =

Rural district in Ardabil province, Iran

Qeshlaq-e Jonubi Rural District Persian: دهستان قشلاق جنوبي
- Rural District
- Location within Iran
- Coordinates: 39°16′N 47°50′E
- Country: Iran
- Province: Ardabil
- County: Bileh Savar
- District: Qeshlaq Dasht
- Established: 1987
- Capital: Shur Gol

Population (2016)
  - Total: 4,868
- Time zone: UTC+3:30 (IRST)

Qeshlaq-e Jonubi Rural District (Persian: دهستان قشلاق جنوبي) is in Qeshlaq Dasht District of Bileh Savar County, Ardabil province, Iran. Its capital is the village of Shur Gol.

== Demographics ==
=== Population ===
At the time of the 2006 National Census, the rural district's population was 6,859 in 1,471 households. There were 5,582 inhabitants in 1,472 households at the following census of 2011. The 2016 census measured the population of the rural district as 4,868 in 1,430 households. The most populous of its 121 villages was Shur Gol, with 405 people.

=== Other villages in the rural district ===
- Azadabad
- Balakhan Kandi
- Chanaq-e Sofla va Olya
- Damirchi-ye Kharabahsi
- Dash Bolagh
- Gholam Hoseyn Kandi
- Hajji Aqa Kandi
- Hajji Aqam Ali Kandi
- Hajji Esmail Iman Khan
- Hajji Nowrush Kandi
- Hajji Qadart Kandi
- Hajji Siab Kandi
- Hamvar Kandi
- Hasan Khan Darrehsi
- Idahlu
- Keram Kandi
- Limlu
- Melli Kandi
- Mirverdi Kandi
- Morad Ali Kandi
- Nazar Ali Bolaghi
- Owch Bolagh
- Para Qeshlaq-e Olya
- Qarah Saqqal-e Sofla
- Qashqa Qeshlaq-e Hajj Akbar
- Qeshlaq-e Aghjaran
- Qeshlaq-e Aji Eshmeh-ye Ali Heydar Beyg
- Qeshlaq-e Aji Eshmeh-ye Nurahmad
- Qeshlaq-e Aji Eshmeh-ye Papur
- Qeshlaq-e Ali Akbar Hamzeh
- Qeshlaq-e Ayan Ali Barat
- Qeshlaq-e Ayan Ali Samad
- Qeshlaq-e Azat
- Qeshlaq-e Chatameh Gholam
- Qeshlaq-e Chenar
- Qeshlaq-e Damirchluy-e Qarah Qeshlaq-e Hajj Abil
- Qeshlaq-e Damirchluy-e Qarah Qeshlaq-e Hajj Majid
- Qeshlaq-e Faraj Esmail
- Qeshlaq-e Faraj Hajj Owraj
- Qeshlaq-e Faraj Moharram
- Qeshlaq-e Ghazanfar-e Bala
- Qeshlaq-e Gowmir Chinlu-ye Owrtadagh
- Qeshlaq-e Gurchinlu Hajj Beyuk
- Qeshlaq-e Gurchinlu Hajj Najaf
- Qeshlaq-e Hajj Ali Barat
- Qeshlaq-e Hajj Aqa Nasir Owgholu
- Qeshlaq-e Hajji Siab
- Qeshlaq-e Hezarat Qoli Abdollah
- Qeshlaq-e Hezarat Qoli Abu ol Hasan
- Qeshlaq-e Hezarat Qoli Bakhtiar
- Qeshlaq-e Hezarat Qoli Gholam
- Qeshlaq-e Hoseyn Narimani
- Qeshlaq-e Khan Owghlan
- Qeshlaq-e Melli Hajji Hamat
- Qeshlaq-e Melli Mahmudlar
- Qeshlaq-e Owch Bolaq
- Qeshlaq-e Owrtadagh-e Esmail
- Qeshlaq-e Owrtadagh-e Hajjiabad
- Qeshlaq-e Owrtadagh-e Tapaduq
- Qeshlaq-e Qarah Kakil Ayaz
- Qeshlaq-e Qarah Kakil Hajji Mahmud
- Qeshlaq-e Qarah Kakil Matleb
- Qeshlaq-e Quja Hajji Khosrow
- Qeshlaq-e Sadi Kandi
- Qeshlaq-e Seyyedlar Dadalu Hoseyn Ali
- Qeshlaq-e Seyyedlar Dadalu Yidallah
- Qeshlaq-e Seyyedlar Sari Quyi Hajj Bayram
- Qeshlaq-e Seyyedlar-e Seyfollah
- Qeshlaq-e Seyyedlari Sari Quyi Moradlu
- Qeshlaq-e Tumar
- Qeshlaq-e Yilatan Hajj Abbas
- Qeshlaq-e Yilatan ol Hurdi Dowlat
- Qeshlaq-e Zeynal-e Olya
- Qobad Kandi
- Qutur Bolagh
- Sari Bolagh
- Shabi Kandi
- Shurqui
- Sohrababad
- Soltan Qeshlaqi
- Tazeh Kand-e Chenaq
- Tumar Kandi
- Yan Bolagh
- Zal Qoli Kandi
