= Idahlu, Bileh Savar =

Village in Ardabil province, Iran

Idahlu Persian: ايده لو
- Village
- Location within Iran
- Coordinates: 39°11′00″N 47°52′27″E
- Country: Iran
- Province: Ardabil
- County: Bileh Savar
- District: Qeshlaq Dasht
- Rural District: Qeshlaq-e Jonubi

Population (2016)
  - Total: 16
- Time zone: UTC+3:30 (IRST)

Idahlu (Persian: ايده لو) (Note: Also romanized as Eydehlū, Īdahlū, Idahlū, Idehloo, and Īdehlū) is a village in Qeshlaq-e Jonubi Rural District of Qeshlaq Dasht District in Bileh Savar County, Ardabil province, Iran.

== Demographics ==
=== Population ===
At the time of the 2006 National Census, the village's population was below the reporting threshold. The following census in 2011 counted 15 people in four households. The 2016 census measured the population of the village as 16 people in six households.
