= Hajji Nowrush Kandi =

Village in Ardabil province, Iran

Hajji Nowrush Kandi Persian: حاجي نورش كندي
- Village
- Location within Iran
- Coordinates: 39°13′11″N 47°41′27″E
- Country: Iran
- Province: Ardabil
- County: Bileh Savar
- District: Qeshlaq Dasht
- Rural District: Qeshlaq-e Jonubi

Population (2016)
  - Total: 51
- Time zone: UTC+3:30 (IRST)

Hajji Nowrush Kandi (Persian: حاجي نورش كندي) (Note: Also romanized as Ḩājjī Nowrūsh Kandī; also known as Ḩājjī Norūsh Kandī) is a village in Qeshlaq-e Jonubi Rural District of Qeshlaq Dasht District in Bileh Savar County, Ardabil province, Iran.

== Demographics ==
=== Population ===
At the time of the 2006 National Census, the village's population was 70 in 14 households. The following census in 2011 counted 43 people in 12 households. The 2016 census again measured the population as 51 people in 13 households.
