= Yan Bolagh, Ardabil =

Village in Ardabil province, Iran

Yan Bolagh Persian: يان بلاغ
- Village
- Location within Iran
- Coordinates: 39°13′14″N 47°59′25″E
- Country: Iran
- Province: Ardabil
- County: Bileh Savar
- District: Qeshlaq Dasht
- Rural District: Qeshlaq-e Jonubi

Population (2016)
  - Total: 30
- Time zone: UTC+3:30 (IRST)

Yan Bolagh (Persian: يان بلاغ) (Note: Also romanized as Yān Bolāgh and Yānbolāgh; also known as Pān Bolāgh) is a village in Qeshlaq-e Jonubi Rural District of Qeshlaq Dasht District in Bileh Savar County, Ardabil province, Iran.

== Demographics ==
=== Population ===
At the time of the 2006 National Census, the village's population was 99 in 21 households. The following census in 2011 counted 68 people in 18 households. The 2016 census measured the population of the village as 30 people in 10 households.
