= Qeshlaq-e Ghazanfar-e Bala =

Village in Ardabil province, Iran

Qeshlaq-e Ghazanfar-e Bala Persian: قشلاق غضنفربالا
- Village
- Location within Iran
- Coordinates: 39°10′48″N 47°44′09″E
- Country: Iran
- Province: Ardabil
- County: Bileh Savar
- District: Qeshlaq Dasht
- Rural District: Qeshlaq-e Jonubi

Population (2016)
  - Total: Below reporting threshold
- Time zone: UTC+3:30 (IRST)

Qeshlaq-e Ghazanfar-e Bala (Persian: قشلاق غضنفربالا) (Note: Also romanized as Qeshlāq-e Ghaz̤anfar-e Bālā) is a village in Qeshlaq-e Jonubi Rural District of Qeshlaq Dasht District in Bileh Savar County, Ardabil province, Iran.

== Demographics ==
=== Population ===
At the time of the 2006 National Census, the village's population was 33 in seven households. The following census in 2011 counted 26 people in eight households. The 2016 census measured the population as below the reporting threshold.
