= Damirchi-ye Kharabahsi =

Village in Ardabil province, Iran

Damirchi-ye Kharabahsi Persian: دميرچي خرابه سي
- Village
- Location within Iran
- Coordinates: 39°11′01″N 47°48′03″E
- Country: Iran
- Province: Ardabil
- County: Bileh Savar
- District: Qeshlaq Dasht
- Rural District: Qeshlaq-e Jonubi

Population (2016)
  - Total: 121
- Time zone: UTC+3:30 (IRST)

Damirchi-ye Kharabahsi (Persian: دميرچي خرابه سي) (Note: Also romanized as Damīrchī-ye Kharābahsī; also known as Damīrchī-ye Kharābasī and Damīrch-ye Kharābahsī) is a village in Qeshlaq-e Jonubi Rural District of Qeshlaq Dasht District in Bileh Savar County, Ardabil province, Iran.

== Demographics ==
=== Population ===
At the time of the 2006 National Census, the village's population was 323 in 75 households. The following census in 2011 counted 213 people in 56 households. The 2016 census measured the population as 121 people in 38 households.
