= Qeshlaq-e Khan Owghlan =

Village in Ardabil province, Iran

Qeshlaq-e Khan Owghlan Persian: قشلاق خان اوغلان
- Village
- Location within Iran
- Country: Iran
- Province: Ardabil
- County: Bileh Savar
- District: Qeshlaq Dasht
- Rural District: Qeshlaq-e Jonubi

Population (2016)
  - Total: 52
- Time zone: UTC+3:30 (IRST)

Qeshlaq-e Khan Owghlan (Persian: قشلاق خان اوغلان) (Note: Also romanized as Qeshlāq-e Khān Owghlān; also known as Ojāq Qeshlāq, Owjāq Qeshlāq, and Qeshlāq-e Khān Oghlān) is a village in Qeshlaq-e Jonubi Rural District of Qeshlaq Dasht District in Bileh Savar County, Ardabil province, Iran.

== Demographics ==
=== Population ===
At the time of the 2006 National Census, the village's population was 80 in 21 households. The following census in 2011 counted 59 people in 20 households. The 2016 census measured the population of the village as 52 people in 18 households.
