= Shabi Kandi =

Village in Ardabil province, Iran

Shabi Kandi Persian: شابی کندی
- Village
- Location within Iran
- Coordinates: 39°13′07″N 47°57′10″E
- Country: Iran
- Province: Ardabil
- County: Bileh Savar
- District: Qeshlaq Dasht
- Rural District: Qeshlaq-e Jonubi

Population (2016)
  - Total: 69
- Time zone: UTC+3:30 (IRST)

Shabi Kandi (Persian: شابی کندی) (Note: Also romanized as Shābī Kandī) is a village in Qeshlaq-e Jonubi Rural District of Qeshlaq Dasht District in Bileh Savar County, Ardabil province, Iran.

== Demographics ==
=== Population ===
At the time of the 2006 National Census, the village's population was 124 in 27 households. The following census in 2011 counted 104 people in 29 households. The 2016 census measured the population of the village as 69 people in 18 households.
