= Mirverdi Kandi =

Village in Ardabil province, Iran

Mirverdi Kandi Persian: ميروردي كندي
- Village
- Location within Iran
- Coordinates: 39°11′57″N 47°48′14″E
- Country: Iran
- Province: Ardabil
- County: Bileh Savar
- District: Qeshlaq Dasht
- Rural District: Qeshlaq-e Jonubi

Population (2016)
  - Total: 43
- Time zone: UTC+3:30 (IRST)

Mirverdi Kandi (Persian: ميروردي كندي) (Note: Also romanized as Mīrverdī Kandī; also known as Mehdī Kandī) is a village in Qeshlaq-e Jonubi Rural District of Qeshlaq Dasht District in Bileh Savar County, Ardabil province, Iran.

== Demographics ==
=== Population ===
At the time of the 2006 National Census, the village's population was 162 in 32 households. The following census in 2011 counted 126 people in 28 households. The 2016 census measured the population as 43 people in nine households.
