= Qeshlaq-e Hoseyn Narimani =

Village in Ardabil province, Iran

Qeshlaq-e Hoseyn Narimani Persian: قشلاق حسين نريماني
- Village
- Country: Iran
- Province: Ardabil
- County: Bileh Savar
- District: Qeshlaq Dasht
- Rural District: Qeshlaq-e Jonubi

Population (2016)
  - Total: 43
- Time zone: UTC+3:30 (IRST)

Qeshlaq-e Hoseyn Narimani (Persian: قشلاق حسين نريماني) (Note: Also romanized as Qeshlāq-e Ḩoseyn Narīmānī) is a village in Qeshlaq-e Jonubi Rural District of Qeshlaq Dasht District in Bileh Savar County, Ardabil province, Iran.

== Demographics ==
=== Population ===
At the time of the 2006 National Census, the village's population was 42 in nine households. The village did not appear in the following census of 2011. The 2016 census measured the population as 43 people in 13 households.
