= Owch Bolagh, Bileh Savar =

Village in Ardabil province, Iran

Owch Bolagh Persian: اوچبلاغ
- Village
- Location within Iran
- Coordinates: 39°14′18″N 47°59′10″E
- Country: Iran
- Province: Ardabil
- County: Bileh Savar
- District: Qeshlaq Dasht
- Rural District: Qeshlaq-e Jonubi

Population (2016)
  - Total: 22
- Time zone: UTC+3:30 (IRST)

Owch Bolagh (Persian: اوچبلاغ) (Note: Also romanized as Owch Bolāgh and Ūchbolāgh; also known as Uchbulak) is a village in Qeshlaq-e Jonubi Rural District of Qeshlaq Dasht District in Bileh Savar County, Ardabil province, Iran.

== Demographics ==
=== Population ===
At the time of the 2006 National Census, the village's population was 50 in 12 households. The following census in 2011 counted 37 people in 11 households. The 2016 census measured the population of the village as 22 people in seven households.
