= Qashqa Qeshlaq-e Hajj Akbar =

Village in Ardabil province, Iran

Qashqa Qeshlaq-e Hajj Akbar Persian: قاشقاقشلاق حاج اكبر
- Village
- Country: Iran
- Province: Ardabil
- County: Bileh Savar
- District: Qeshlaq Dasht
- Rural District: Qeshlaq-e Jonubi

Population (2016)
  - Total: 34
- Time zone: UTC+3:30 (IRST)

Qashqa Qeshlaq-e Hajj Akbar (Persian: قاشقاقشلاق حاج اكبر) (Note: Also romanized as Qāshqā Qeshlāq-e Ḩājj Akbar) is a village in Qeshlaq-e Jonubi Rural District of Qeshlaq Dasht District in Bileh Savar County, Ardabil province, Iran.

== Demographics ==
=== Population ===
At the time of the 2006 National Census, the village's population was 23 in five households. The following census in 2011 counted a population below the reporting threshold. The 2016 census measured the population as 34 people in 10 households.
