= Ilat Zamin =

- Location in Iran
- Coordinates: 37°15′44″N 48°55′58″E
- Country: Iran
- Province: Ardabil Province
- Time zone: UTC+3:30 (IRST)
  - Summer (DST): UTC+4:30 (IRDT)

Ilat Zamin is a village in the Ardabil Province of Iran.
