= Qeshlaq-e Hajji Siab =

Village in Ardabil province, Iran

Qeshlaq-e Hajji Siab Persian: قشلاق حاجي سياب
- Village
- Country: Iran
- Province: Ardabil
- County: Bileh Savar
- District: Qeshlaq Dasht
- Rural District: Qeshlaq-e Jonubi

Population (2016)
  - Total: 14
- Time zone: UTC+3:30 (IRST)

Qeshlaq-e Hajji Siab (Persian: قشلاق حاجي سياب) (Note: Also romanized as Qeshlāq-e Ḩājjī Sīāb) is a village in Qeshlaq-e Jonubi Rural District of Qeshlaq Dasht District in Bileh Savar County, Ardabil province, Iran.

== Demographics ==
=== Population ===
At the time of the 2006 National Census, the village's population was 17 in four households. The village did not appear in the following census of 2011. The 2016 census measured the population as 14 people in five households.
