= Zal Qoli Kandi =

Village in Ardabil province, Iran

Zal Qoli Kandi Persian: زال قلي كندي
- Village
- Location within Iran
- Coordinates: 39°12′18″N 47°50′40″E
- Country: Iran
- Province: Ardabil
- County: Bileh Savar
- District: Qeshlaq Dasht
- Rural District: Qeshlaq-e Jonubi

Population (2016)
  - Total: 61
- Time zone: UTC+3:30 (IRST)

Zal Qoli Kandi (Persian: زال قلي كندي,) (Note: Also romanized as Zāl Qolī Kandī; also known as Zāl Kandī) is a village in Qeshlaq-e Jonubi Rural District of Qeshlaq Dasht District in Bileh Savar County, Ardabil province, Iran.

== Demographics ==
=== Population ===
At the time of the 2006 National Census, the village's population was 88 in 16 households. The following census in 2011 counted 86 people in 19 households. The 2016 census again measured the population as 61 people in 22 households.
