= Tazeh Kand-e Chenaq =

Village in Ardabil province, Iran

Tazeh Kand-e Chenaq Persian: تازه كند چناق
- Village
- Location within Iran
- Country: Iran
- Province: Ardabil
- County: Bileh Savar
- District: Qeshlaq Dasht
- Rural District: Qeshlaq-e Jonubi

Population (2016)
  - Total: 67
- Time zone: UTC+3:30 (IRST)

Tazeh Kand-e Chenaq (Persian: تازه كند چناق) (Note: Also romanized as Tāzeh Kand-e Chenāq and Tāzehkand-e Chenāq) is a village in Qeshlaq-e Jonubi Rural District of Qeshlaq Dasht District in Bileh Savar County, Ardabil province, Iran.

== Demographics ==
=== Population ===
At the time of the 2006 National Census, the village's population was 92 in 19 households. The following census in 2011 counted 74 people in 21 households. The 2016 census measured the population of the village as 67 people in 17 households.
