= Hajji Qadart Kandi =

Village in Ardabil province, Iran

Hajji Qadart Kandi Persian: حاجي قدرت كندي
- Village
- Location within Iran
- Coordinates: 39°17′28″N 47°55′38″E
- Country: Iran
- Province: Ardabil
- County: Bileh Savar
- District: Qeshlaq Dasht
- Rural District: Qeshlaq-e Jonubi

Population (2016)
  - Total: 106
- Time zone: UTC+3:30 (IRST)

Hajji Qadart Kandi (Persian: حاجي قدرت كندي) (Note: Also romanized as Ḩājjī Qadart Kandī) is a village in Qeshlaq-e Jonubi Rural District of Qeshlaq Dasht District in Bileh Savar County, Ardabil province, Iran.

== Demographics ==
=== Population ===
At the time of the 2006 National Census, the village's population was 48 in 10 households. The following census in 2011 counted 43 people in 16 households. The 2016 census measured the population of the village as 106 people in 31 households.
