= Balakhan Kandi =

Village in Ardabil province, Iran

Balakhan Kandi Persian: بالاخان كندي
- Village
- Location within Iran
- Coordinates: 39°13′05″N 47°54′29″E
- Country: Iran
- Province: Ardabil
- County: Bileh Savar
- District: Qeshlaq Dasht
- Rural District: Qeshlaq-e Jonubi

Population (2016)
  - Total: 26
- Time zone: UTC+3:30 (IRST)

Balakhan Kandi (Persian: بالاخان كندي) (Note: Also romanized as Bālākhān Kandī) is a village in Qeshlaq-e Jonubi Rural District of Qeshlaq Dasht District in Bileh Savar County, Ardabil province, Iran.

== Demographics ==
=== Population ===
At the time of the 2006 National Census, the village's population was 45 in seven households. The following census in 2011 counted 32 people in eight households. The 2016 census measured the population of the village as 26 people in nine households.
