= Hajji Aqa Kandi =

Village in Ardabil province, Iran

Hajji Aqa Kandi Persian: حاجي اقاكندي
- Village
- Location within Iran
- Coordinates: 39°13′24″N 47°57′21″E
- Country: Iran
- Province: Ardabil
- County: Bileh Savar
- District: Qeshlaq Dasht
- Rural District: Qeshlaq-e Jonubi

Population (2016)
  - Total: 111
- Time zone: UTC+3:30 (IRST)

Hajji Aqa Kandi (Persian: حاجي اقاكندي) (Note: Also romanized as Ḩājjī Āqā Kandī) is a village in Qeshlaq-e Jonubi Rural District of Qeshlaq Dasht District in Bileh Savar County, Ardabil province, Iran.

== Demographics ==
=== Population ===
At the time of the 2006 National Census, the village's population was 189 in 35 households. The following census in 2011 counted 178 people in 42 households. The 2016 census measured the population of the village as 111 people in 33 households.
