= Qeshlaq-e Gowmir Chinlu-ye Owrtadagh =

Village in Ardabil province, Iran

Qeshlaq-e Gowmir Chinlu-ye Owrtadagh Persian: قشلاق گورچينلواورتاداغ
- Village
- Location within Iran
- Country: Iran
- Province: Ardabil
- County: Bileh Savar
- District: Qeshlaq Dasht
- Rural District: Qeshlaq-e Jonubi

Population (2016)
  - Total: 117
- Time zone: UTC+3:30 (IRST)

Qeshlaq-e Gowmir Chinlu-ye Owrtadagh (Persian: قشلاق گورچينلواورتاداغ) (Note: Also romanized as Qeshlāq-e Gowmīr Chīnlū-ye Owrtādāgh) is a village in Qeshlaq-e Jonubi Rural District of Qeshlaq Dasht District in Bileh Savar County, Ardabil province, Iran.

== Demographics ==
=== Population ===
At the time of the 2006 National Census, the village's population was 125 in 26 households. The following census in 2011 counted 120 people in 30 households. The 2016 census measured the population of the village as 117 people in 37 households.
