= Hajji Siab Kandi =

Village in Ardabil province, Iran

Hajji Siab Kandi Persian: حاجي سياب كندي
- Village
- Location within Iran
- Country: Iran
- Province: Ardabil
- County: Bileh Savar
- District: Qeshlaq Dasht
- Rural District: Qeshlaq-e Jonubi

Population (2016)
  - Total: 11
- Time zone: UTC+3:30 (IRST)

Hajji Siab Kandi (Persian: حاجي سياب كندي) (Note: Also romanized as Ḩājji Sīāb Kandī) is a village in Qeshlaq-e Jonubi Rural District of Qeshlaq Dasht District in Bileh Savar County, Ardabil province, Iran.

== Demographics ==
=== Population ===
At the time of the 2006 National Census, the village's population was 24 in six households. The following census in 2011 counted 17 people in four households. The 2016 census measured the population of the village as 11 people in four households.
