= Morad Ali Kandi =

Village in Ardabil province, Iran

Morad Ali Kandi Persian: مرادعلي كندي
- Village
- Location within Iran
- Coordinates: 39°13′15″N 47°56′06″E
- Country: Iran
- Province: Ardabil
- County: Bileh Savar
- District: Qeshlaq Dasht
- Rural District: Qeshlaq-e Jonubi

Population (2016)
  - Total: 58
- Time zone: UTC+3:30 (IRST)

Morad Ali Kandi (Persian: مرادعلي كندي) (Note: Also romanized as Morād ‘Alī Kandī) is a village in Qeshlaq-e Jonubi Rural District of Qeshlaq Dasht District in Bileh Savar County, Ardabil province, Iran.

== Demographics ==
=== Population ===
At the time of the 2006 National Census, the village's population was 118 in 25 households. The following census in 2011 counted 79 people in 22 households. The 2016 census measured the population of the village as 58 people in 16 households.
