= Qeshlaq-e Tumar =

Village in Ardabil province, Iran

Qeshlaq-e Tumar Persian: قشلاق تومار
- Village
- Location within Iran
- Country: Iran
- Province: Ardabil
- County: Bileh Savar
- District: Qeshlaq Dasht
- Rural District: Qeshlaq-e Jonubi

Population (2016)
  - Total: 0
- Time zone: UTC+3:30 (IRST)

Qeshlaq-e Tumar (Persian: قشلاق تومار) (Note: Also romanized as Qeshlāq-e Tūmār) is a village in Qeshlaq-e Jonubi Rural District of Qeshlaq Dasht District in Bileh Savar County, Ardabil province, Iran.

== Demographics ==
=== Population ===
At the time of the 2006 National Census, the village's population was 24 in four households. The village did not appear in the following census of 2011. The 2016 census measured the population of the village as zero.
