= Shurqui =

Village in Ardabil province, Iran

Shurqui Persian: شورقويي
- Village
- Location within Iran
- Coordinates: 39°18′43″N 47°59′56″E
- Country: Iran
- Province: Ardabil
- County: Bileh Savar
- District: Qeshlaq Dasht
- Rural District: Qeshlaq-e Jonubi

Population (2016)
  - Total: 99
- Time zone: UTC+3:30 (IRST)

Shurqui (Persian: شورقويي) (Note: Also romanized as Shūrqū’ī; also known as Shūrqūyū) is a village in Qeshlaq-e Jonubi Rural District of Qeshlaq Dasht District in Bileh Savar County, Ardabil province, Iran.

== Demographics ==
=== Population ===
At the time of the 2006 National Census, the village's population was 105 in 25 households. The following census in 2011 counted 92 people in 26 households. The 2016 census measured the population of the village as 99 people in 32 households.
