= Qeshlaq-e Owch Bolaq =

Village in Ardabil province, Iran

Qeshlaq-e Owch Bolaq Persian: قشلاق اوچبلاق
- Village
- Country: Iran
- Province: Ardabil
- County: Bileh Savar
- District: Qeshlaq Dasht
- Rural District: Qeshlaq-e Jonubi

Population (2016)
  - Total: 64
- Time zone: UTC+3:30 (IRST)

Qeshlaq-e Owch Bolaq (Persian: قشلاق اوچبلاق) (Note: Also Romanized as Qeshlāq-e Owch Bolāq) is a village in Qeshlaq-e Jonubi Rural District of Qeshlaq Dasht District in Bileh Savar County, Ardabil province, Iran.

== Demographics ==
=== Population ===
At the time of the 2006 National Census, the village's population was 94 in 25 households. The following census in 2011 counted 44 people in 22 households. The 2016 census measured the population of the village as 64 people in 22 households.
