= Tumar Kandi, Ardabil =

Village in Ardabil province, Iran

Tumar Kandi Persian: توماركندي
- Village
- Location within Iran
- Coordinates: 39°12′19″N 47°51′48″E
- Country: Iran
- Province: Ardabil
- County: Bileh Savar
- District: Qeshlaq Dasht
- Rural District: Qeshlaq-e Jonubi

Population (2016)
  - Total: 83
- Time zone: UTC+3:30 (IRST)

Tumar Kandi (Persian: توماركندي) (Note: Also romanized as Tūmār Kandī; also known as Qeshlāq-e Tūmār Şādeq and Tūmār) is a village in Qeshlaq-e Jonubi Rural District of Qeshlaq Dasht District in Bileh Savar County, Ardabil province, Iran.

== Demographics ==
=== Population ===
At the time of the 2006 National Census, the village's population was 114 in 20 households. The following census in 2011 counted 117 people in 26 households. The 2016 census measured the population of the village as 83 people in 28 households.
