= Hasan Khan Darrehsi =

Village in Ardabil province, Iran

Hasan Khan Darrehsi Persian: حسن خان دره سي
- Village
- Location within Iran
- Coordinates: 39°12′11″N 47°55′56″E
- Country: Iran
- Province: Ardabil
- County: Bileh Savar
- District: Qeshlaq Dasht
- Rural District: Qeshlaq-e Jonubi

Population (2016)
  - Total: 86
- Time zone: UTC+3:30 (IRST)

Hasan Khan Darrehsi (Persian: حسن خان دره سي) (Note: Also romanized as Ḩasan Khan Darrehsī) is a village in Qeshlaq-e Jonubi Rural District of Qeshlaq Dasht District in Bileh Savar County, Ardabil province, Iran.

== Demographics ==
=== Population ===
At the time of the 2006 National Census, the village's population was 122 people in 25 households. The following census in 2011 counted 123 people in 37 households. The 2016 census measured the population of the village as 86 people in 24 households.
