= Hamvar Kandi =

Village in Ardabil province, Iran

Hamvar Kandi Persian: همواركندي
- Village
- Location within Iran
- Coordinates: 39°13′41″N 47°58′26″E
- Country: Iran
- Province: Ardabil
- County: Bileh Savar
- District: Qeshlaq Dasht
- Rural District: Qeshlaq-e Jonubi

Population (2016)
  - Total: 58
- Time zone: UTC+3:30 (IRST)

Hamvar Kandi (Persian: همواركندي) (Note: Also romanized as Hamvār Kandī; also known as Hāmār Kandī) is a village in Qeshlaq-e Jonubi Rural District of Qeshlaq Dasht District in Bileh Savar County, Ardabil province, Iran.

== Demographics ==
=== Population ===
At the time of the 2006 National Census, the village's population was 138 in 27 households. The following census in 2011 counted 81 people in 22 households. The 2016 census measured the population of the village as 58 people in 17 households.
