= Qeshlaq-e Ali Akbar Hamzeh =

Village in Ardabil province, Iran

Qeshlaq-e Ali Akbar Hamzeh Persian: قشلاق علی اکبرحمزه
- Village
- Location within Iran
- Coordinates: 39°18′44″N 47°43′55″E
- Country: Iran
- Province: Ardabil
- County: Bileh Savar
- District: Qeshlaq Dasht
- Rural District: Qeshlaq-e Jonubi

Population (2016)
  - Total: 30
- Time zone: UTC+3:30 (IRST)

Qeshlaq-e Ali Akbar Hamzeh (Persian: قشلاق علی اکبرحمزه) (Note: Also romanized as Qeshlāq-e ʿAlī Akbar Ḩamzeh) is a village in Qeshlaq-e Jonubi Rural District of Qeshlaq Dasht District in Bileh Savar County, Ardabil province, Iran.

== Demographics ==
=== Population ===
At the time of the 2006 National Census, the village's population was 29 in five households. The following census in 2011 counted 25 people in five households. The 2016 census again measured the population as 30 people in six households.
