= Molla Yusef, Ardabil =

Neighborhood in Ardabil province, Iran

Molla Yusef Persian: ملايوسف
- Neighborhood
- Location within Iran
- Coordinates: 38°14′56″N 48°15′50″E
- Country: Iran
- Province: Ardabil
- County: Ardabil
- District: Central
- City: Ardabil

Population (2006)
  - Total: 4,752
- Time zone: UTC+3:30 (IRST)

Molla Yusef (Persian: ملايوسف) (Note: Also romanized as Mollā Yūsef) is a neighborhood in the city of Ardabil in the Central District of Ardabil County, Ardabil province, Iran.

== Demographics ==
=== Population ===
At the time of the 2006 National Census, Molla Yusef's population was 4,752 in 1,150 households, when it was a village in Balghelu Rural District. Molla Yusef did not appear in the following censuses of 2011 and 2016.
