= Qobad Kandi =

Village in Ardabil province, Iran

Qobad Kandi Persian: قبادكندي
- Village
- Location within Iran
- Coordinates: 39°12′13″N 47°49′31″E
- Country: Iran
- Province: Ardabil
- County: Bileh Savar
- District: Qeshlaq Dasht
- Rural District: Qeshlaq-e Jonubi

Population (2016)
  - Total: 73
- Time zone: UTC+3:30 (IRST)

Qobad Kandi (Persian: قبادكندي) (Note: Also romanized as Qobād Kandī) is a village in Qeshlaq-e Jonubi Rural District of Qeshlaq Dasht District in Bileh Savar County, Ardabil province, Iran.

== Demographics ==
=== Population ===
At the time of the 2006 National Census, the village's population was 112 in 21 households. The following census in 2011 counted 116 people in 23 households. The 2016 census again measured the population as 73 people in 20 households.
