= Melli Kandi =

Village in Ardabil province, Iran

Melli Kandi Persian: ملي كندي
- Village
- Location within Iran
- Coordinates: 39°11′38″N 47°44′13″E
- Country: Iran
- Province: Ardabil
- County: Bileh Savar
- District: Qeshlaq Dasht
- Rural District: Qeshlaq-e Jonubi

Population (2016)
  - Total: 90
- Time zone: UTC+3:30 (IRST)

Melli Kandi (Persian: ملي كندي) (Note: Also romanized as Mellī Kandī) is a village in Qeshlaq-e Jonubi Rural District of Qeshlaq Dasht District in Bileh Savar County, Ardabil province, Iran.

== Demographics ==
=== Population ===
At the time of the 2006 National Census, the village's population was 98 in 18 households. The following census in 2011 counted 101 people in 22 households. The 2016 census measured the population as 90 people in 20 households.
