= Qeshlaq-e Hajj Ali Barat =

Village in Ardabil province, Iran

Qeshlaq-e Hajj Ali Barat Persian: قشلاق حاج علي برات
- Village
- Location within Iran
- Country: Iran
- Province: Ardabil
- County: Bileh Savar
- District: Qeshlaq Dasht
- Rural District: Qeshlaq-e Jonubi

Population (2016)
  - Total: 47
- Time zone: UTC+3:30 (IRST)

Qeshlaq-e Hajj Ali Barat (Persian: قشلاق حاج علي برات) (Note: Also romanized as Qeshlāq-e Ḩājj ‘Alī Barāt) is a village in Qeshlaq-e Jonubi Rural District of Qeshlaq Dasht District in Bileh Savar County, Ardabil province, Iran.

== Demographics ==
=== Population ===
At the time of the 2006 National Census, the village's population was 48 in nine households. The following census in 2011 counted 39 people in nine households. The 2016 census again measured the population as 47 people in 12 households.
