= Soltan Qeshlaqi =

Village in Ardabil province, Iran

Soltan Qeshlaqi Persian: سلطان قشلاقي
- Village
- Location within Iran
- Coordinates: 39°16′16″N 47°54′33″E
- Country: Iran
- Province: Ardabil
- County: Bileh Savar
- District: Qeshlaq Dasht
- Rural District: Qeshlaq-e Jonubi

Population (2016)
  - Total: 61
- Time zone: UTC+3:30 (IRST)

Soltan Qeshlaqi (Persian: سلطان قشلاقي) (Note: Also romanized as Solṭān Qeshlāqī) is a village in Qeshlaq-e Jonubi Rural District of Qeshlaq Dasht District in Bileh Savar County, Ardabil province, Iran.

== Demographics ==
=== Population ===
At the time of the 2006 National Census, the village's population was 73 in 17 households. The following census in 2011 counted 68 people in 21 households. The 2016 census measured the population of the village as 61 people in 20 households.
