= Hajji Aqam Ali Kandi =

Village in Ardabil province, Iran

Hajji Aqam Ali Kandi Persian: حاجي اقامعلي كندي
- Village
- Location within Iran
- Coordinates: 39°18′01″N 47°57′17″E
- Country: Iran
- Province: Ardabil
- County: Bileh Savar
- District: Qeshlaq Dasht
- Rural District: Qeshlaq-e Jonubi

Population (2016)
  - Total: 21
- Time zone: UTC+3:30 (IRST)

Hajji Aqam Ali Kandi (Persian: حاجي اقامعلي كندي) (Note: Also romanized as Ḩājjī Āqām ʿAlī Kandī; also known as Ḩājjī Āqā Kandī) is a village in Qeshlaq-e Jonubi Rural District of Qeshlaq Dasht District in Bileh Savar County, Ardabil province, Iran.

== Demographics ==
=== Population ===
At the time of the 2006 National Census, the village's population was 48 in nine households. The following census in 2011 counted 69 people in 26 households. The 2016 census measured the population of the village as 21 people in 10 households.
