= Hajji Esmail Iman Khan =

Village in Ardabil province, Iran

Hajji Esmail Iman Khan Persian: حاجي اسماعيل ايمان خان
- Village
- Location within Iran
- Coordinates: 39°19′36″N 47°55′44″E
- Country: Iran
- Province: Ardabil
- County: Bileh Savar
- District: Qeshlaq Dasht
- Rural District: Qeshlaq-e Jonubi

Population (2016)
  - Total: 43
- Time zone: UTC+3:30 (IRST)

Hajji Esmail Iman Khan (Persian: حاجي اسماعيل ايمان خان) (Note: Also romanized as Ḩājjī Esmāʿīl Īmān Khān; also known as Ḩājj Īmān Khān) is a village in Qeshlaq-e Jonubi Rural District of Qeshlaq Dasht District in Bileh Savar County, Ardabil province, Iran.

== Demographics ==
=== Population ===
At the time of the 2006 National Census, the village's population was 91 in 19 households. The following census in 2011 counted 75 people in 24 households. The 2016 census measured the population of the village as 43 people in 12 households.
