= Mir Kandi =

Village in Ardabil province, Iran

Mir Kandi Persian: ميركندي
- Village
- Location within Iran
- Coordinates: 38°24′21″N 47°35′23″E
- Country: Iran
- Province: Ardabil
- County: Meshgin Shahr
- District: Central
- Rural District: Dasht

Population (2016)
  - Total: 611
- Time zone: UTC+3:30 (IRST)

Mir Kandi (Persian: ميركندي) (Note: Also romanized as Mīr Kandī) is a village in Dasht Rural District of the Central District in Meshgin Shahr County, Ardabil province, Iran.

== Demographics ==
=== Population ===
At the time of the 2006 National Census, the village's population was 838 in 200 households, when it was in Meshgin-e Gharbi Rural District. The following census in 2011 counted 675 people in 195 households. The 2016 census measured the population of the village as 611 people in 206 households, by which time Mir Kandi had been transferred to Dasht Rural District.
