= Sari Bolagh, Ardabil =

Village in Ardabil province, Iran

Sari Bolagh Persian: ساري بلاغ
- Village
- Location within Iran
- Coordinates: 39°14′15″N 48°00′43″E
- Country: Iran
- Province: Ardabil
- County: Bileh Savar
- District: Qeshlaq Dasht
- Rural District: Qeshlaq-e Jonubi

Population (2016)
  - Total: 111
- Time zone: UTC+3:30 (IRST)

Sari Bolagh (Persian: ساري بلاغ) (Note: Also romanized as Sārī Bolāgh) is a village in Qeshlaq-e Jonubi Rural District of Qeshlaq Dasht District in Bileh Savar County, Ardabil province, Iran.

== Demographics ==
=== Population ===
At the time of the 2006 National Census, the village's population was 68 in 15 households. The following census in 2011 counted 69 people in 20 households. The 2016 census measured the population of the village as 68 people in 19 households.
