= Nazar Ali Bolaghi =

Village in Ardabil province, Iran

Nazar Ali Bolaghi Persian: نظرعلي بلاغي
- Village
- Location within Iran
- Coordinates: 39°16′08″N 47°59′43″E
- Country: Iran
- Province: Ardabil
- County: Bileh Savar
- District: Qeshlaq Dasht
- Rural District: Qeshlaq-e Jonubi

Population (2016)
  - Total: 214
- Time zone: UTC+3:30 (IRST)

Nazar Ali Bolaghi (Persian: نظرعلی‌بلاغی) (Note: Also romanized as Naz̧ar ‘Alī Bolāghī; also known as Naz̧ar Bolāgh) is a village in Qeshlaq-e Jonubi Rural District of Qeshlaq Dasht District in Bileh Savar County, Ardabil province, Iran.

== Demographics ==
=== Population ===
At the time of the 2006 National Census, the village's population was 319 in 84 households. The following census in 2011 counted 336 people in 107 households. The 2016 census measured the population of the village as 214 people in 69 households.
