= Qeshlaq-e Aghjaran =

Village in Ardabil province, Iran

Qeshlaq-e Aghjaran Persian: قشلاق اغجاران
- Village
- Location within Iran
- Coordinates: 39°20′11″N 47°56′47″E
- Country: Iran
- Province: Ardabil
- County: Bileh Savar
- District: Qeshlaq Dasht
- Rural District: Qeshlaq-e Jonubi

Population (2016)
  - Total: 63
- Time zone: UTC+3:30 (IRST)

Qeshlaq-e Aghjaran (Persian: قشلاق اغجاران) (Note: Also romanized as Qeshlāq-e Aghjārān) is a village in Qeshlaq-e Jonubi Rural District of Qeshlaq Dasht District in Bileh Savar County, Ardabil province, Iran.

== Demographics ==
=== Population ===
At the time of the 2006 National Census, the village's population was 66 in 12 households. The following census in 2011 counted 51 people in 12 households. The 2016 census measured the population of the village as 63 people in 18 households.
