= Bilah Daraq, Sareyn =

Village in Ardabil province, Iran

Bilah Daraq Persian: بيله درق
- Village
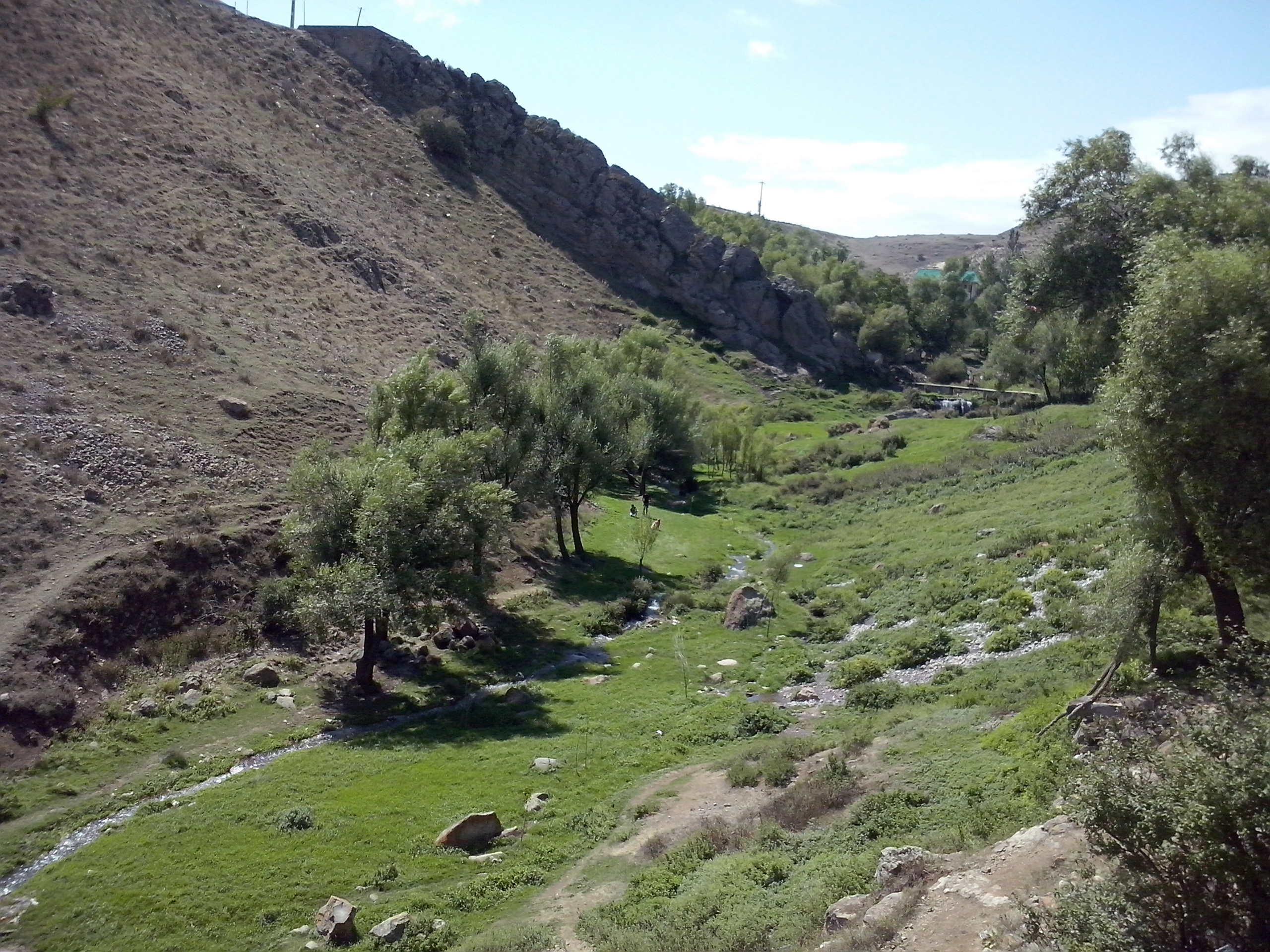

- Location within Iran
- Coordinates: 38°10′38″N 48°03′21″E
- Country: Iran
- Province: Ardabil
- County: Sareyn
- District: Central
- Rural District: Ab-e Garm

Population (2016)
  - Total: 497
- Time zone: UTC+3:30 (IRST)

Bilah Daraq (Persian: بيله درق) (Note: Also romanized as Bīlah Daraq; also known as Valī Darreh and Vīlā Darreh) is a village in Ab-e Garm Rural District of the Central District in Sareyn County, Ardabil province, Iran.

== Demographics ==
=== Population ===
At the time of the 2006 National Census, the village's population was 492 in 105 households, when it was in the former Sareyn District of Ardabil County. The following census in 2011 counted 578 people in 175 households, by which time the district had been separated from the county in the establishment of Sareyn County. The rural district was transferred to the new Central District. The 2016 census measured the population of the village as 497 people in 150 households.
