= Para Qeshlaq-e Olya =

Village in Ardabil province, Iran

Para Qeshlaq-e Olya Persian: پاراقشلاق علیا
- Village
- Location within Iran
- Coordinates: 39°11′43″N 47°54′55″E
- Country: Iran
- Province: Ardabil
- County: Bileh Savar
- District: Qeshlaq Dasht
- Rural District: Qeshlaq-e Jonubi

Population (2016)
  - Total: 35
- Time zone: UTC+3:30 (IRST)

Para Qeshlaq-e Olya (Persian: پاراقشلاق علیا) (Note: Also romanized as Pārā Qeshlāq-e ‘Olyā; also known as Bāreh Qeshlāq, Pāreh Qeshlāq, and Pāreh Qeshlāq-e ‘Olyā) is a village in Qeshlaq-e Jonubi Rural District of Qeshlaq Dasht District in Bileh Savar County, Ardabil province, Iran.

== Demographics ==
=== Population ===
At the time of the 2006 National Census, the village's population was 48 people in 12 households. The following census in 2011 counted 42 people in 10 households. The 2016 census measured the population of the village as 35 people in eight households.
