= Gholam Hoseyn Kandi =

Village in Ardabil province, Iran

Gholam Hoseyn Kandi Persian: غلامحسين كندي
- Village
- Location within Iran
- Coordinates: 39°13′14″N 47°43′29″E
- Country: Iran
- Province: Ardabil
- County: Bileh Savar
- District: Qeshlaq Dasht
- Rural District: Qeshlaq-e Jonubi

Population (2016)
  - Total: 55
- Time zone: UTC+3:30 (IRST)

Gholam Hoseyn Kandi (Persian: غلامحسين كندي) (Note: Also romanized as Gholām Ḩoseyn Kandī) is a village in Qeshlaq-e Jonubi Rural District of Qeshlaq Dasht District in Bileh Savar County, Ardabil province, Iran.

== Demographics ==
=== Population ===
At the time of the 2006 National Census, the village's population was 121 in 24 households. The following census in 2011 counted 66 people in 14 households. The 2016 census measured the population of the village as 55 people in 17 households.
