= Limlu, East Azerbaijan =

Limlu ليملو
- Village
- Location within Iran
- Coordinates: 38°37′34″N 47°17′33″E
- Country: Iran
- Province: East Azerbaijan
- County: Ahar
- Bakhsh: Central
- Rural District: Vargahan

Population (2006)
  - Total: 153
- Time zone: UTC+3:30 (IRST)
  - Summer (DST): UTC+4:30 (IRDT)

Limlu (Persian: ليملو, also romanized as Līmlū) is a village in Vargahan Rural District, in the Central District of Ahar County, East Azerbaijan Province, Iran. At the 2006 census, its population was 153, in 34 families.
