= Qarah Saqqal-e Sofla =

Village in Ardabil province, Iran

Qarah Saqqal-e Sofla Persian: قره ‌سقال سفلی
- Village
- Location within Iran
- Coordinates: 39°18′00″N 48°01′55″E
- Country: Iran
- Province: Ardabil
- County: Bileh Savar
- District: Qeshlaq Dasht
- Rural District: Qeshlaq-e Jonubi

Population (2016)
  - Total: 25
- Time zone: UTC+3:30 (IRST)

Qarah Saqqal-e Sofla (Persian: قره‌ سقال سفلی) (Note: Also romanized as Qarah Sāqqāl-e Soflá; also known as Mo‘aţţal) is a village in Qeshlaq-e Jonubi Rural District of Qeshlaq Dasht District in Bileh Savar County, Ardabil province, Iran.

== Demographics ==
=== Population ===
At the time of the 2006 National Census, the village's population was 20 in six households. The following census in 2011 counted 13 people in four households. The 2016 census measured the population of the village as 25 people in six households.
