= Sohrababad, Ardabil =

Village in Ardabil province, Iran

Sohrababad Persian: سهراب اباد
- Village
- Location within Iran
- Coordinates: 39°11′36″N 47°58′00″E
- Country: Iran
- Province: Ardabil
- County: Bileh Savar
- District: Qeshlaq Dasht
- Rural District: Qeshlaq-e Jonubi

Population (2016)
  - Total: 53
- Time zone: UTC+3:30 (IRST)

Sohrababad (Persian: سهراب اباد) (Note: Also romanized as Sohrābābād) is a village in Qeshlaq-e Jonubi Rural District of Qeshlaq Dasht District in Bileh Savar County, Ardabil province, Iran.

== Demographics ==
=== Population ===
At the time of the 2006 National Census, the village's population was 67 in 15 households. The following census in 2011 counted 52 people in 16 households. The 2016 census measured the population of the village as 53 people in 15 households.
