= Keram Kandi =

Village in Ardabil province, Iran

Keram Kandi Persian: كرم كندي
- Village
- Location within Iran
- Coordinates: 39°13′08″N 47°55′09″E
- Country: Iran
- Province: Ardabil
- County: Bileh Savar
- District: Qeshlaq Dasht
- Rural District: Qeshlaq-e Jonubi

Population (2016)
  - Total: 16
- Time zone: UTC+3:30 (IRST)

Keram Kandi (Persian: كرم كندي) (Note: Also romanized as Keram Kandī) is a village in Qeshlaq-e Jonubi Rural District of Qeshlaq Dasht District in Bileh Savar County, Ardabil province, Iran.

== Demographics ==
=== Population ===
At the time of the 2006 National Census, the village's population was 78 in 14 households. The following census in 2011 counted 39 people in nine households. The 2016 census measured the population of the village as 16 people in five households.
