= Chanaq-e Sofla va Olya =

Village in Ardabil province, Iran

Chanaq-e Sofla va Olya Persian: چناق سفلي وعليا
- Village
- Location within Iran
- Coordinates: 39°14′11″N 48°01′38″E
- Country: Iran
- Province: Ardabil
- County: Bileh Savar
- District: Qeshlaq Dasht
- Rural District: Qeshlaq-e Jonubi

Population (2016)
  - Total: 218
- Time zone: UTC+3:30 (IRST)

Chanaq-e Sofla va Olya (Persian: چناق سفلي وعليا) (Note: Also romanized as Chanāq-e Soflá va 'Olyā) is a village in Qeshlaq-e Jonubi Rural District of Qeshlaq Dasht District in Bileh Savar County, Ardabil province, Iran.

== Demographics ==
=== Population ===
At the time of the 2006 National Census, the village's population was 180 in 40 households. The following census in 2011 counted 188 people in 53 households. The 2016 census measured the population of the village as 218 people in 60 households.
