= Qutur Bolagh =

Village in Ardabil province, Iran

Qutur Bolagh Persian: قوطوربلاغ
- Village
- Location within Iran
- Coordinates: 39°13′24″N 47°57′51″E
- Country: Iran
- Province: Ardabil
- County: Bileh Savar
- District: Qeshlaq Dasht
- Rural District: Qeshlaq-e Jonubi

Population (2016)
  - Total: 109
- Time zone: UTC+3:30 (IRST)

Qutur Bolagh (Persian: قوطوربلاغ) (Note: Also romanized as Qūtūr Bolāgh; also known as Qoţūr Bolāgh) is a village in Qeshlaq-e Jonubi Rural District of Qeshlaq Dasht District in Bileh Savar County, Ardabil province, Iran.

== Demographics ==
=== Population ===
At the time of the 2006 National Census, the village's population was 184 in 38 households. The following census in 2011 counted 154 people in 33 households. The 2016 census measured the population of the village as 109 people in 36 households.
