= Qeshlaq-e Quja Hajji Khosrow =

Village in Ardabil province, Iran

Qeshlaq-e Quja Hajji Khosrow Persian: قشلاق قوجاحاجي خسرو
- Village
- Country: Iran
- Province: Ardabil
- County: Bileh Savar
- District: Qeshlaq Dasht
- Rural District: Qeshlaq-e Jonubi

Population (2016)
  - Total: 36
- Time zone: UTC+3:30 (IRST)

Qeshlaq-e Quja Hajji Khosrow (Persian: قشلاق قوجاحاجي خسرو) (Note: Also romanized as Qeshlāq-e Qūjā Ḩājjī Khosrow) is a village in Qeshlaq-e Jonubi Rural District of Qeshlaq Dasht District in Bileh Savar County, Ardabil province, Iran.

== Demographics ==
=== Population ===
At the time of the 2006 National Census, the village's population was 40 in eight households. The following census in 2011 counted 36 people in 12 households. The 2016 census measured the population as 36 people in 12 households.
