= Qeshlaq-e Zeynal-e Olya =

Village in Ardabil province, Iran

Qeshlaq-e Zeynal-e Olya Persian: قشلاق زينال عليا
- Village
- Location within Iran
- Coordinates: 39°14′51″N 47°45′43″E
- Country: Iran
- Province: Ardabil
- County: Bileh Savar
- District: Qeshlaq Dasht
- Rural District: Qeshlaq-e Jonubi

Population (2016)
  - Total: Below reporting threshold
- Time zone: UTC+3:30 (IRST)

Qeshlaq-e Zeynal-e Olya (Persian: قشلاق زينال عليا) (Note: Also romanized as Qeshlāq-e Zeynāl-e ‘Olyā; also known as Qeshlāq-e Zeynāl) is a village in Qeshlaq-e Jonubi Rural District of Qeshlaq Dasht District in Bileh Savar County, Ardabil province, Iran.

== Demographics ==
=== Population ===
At the time of the 2006 National Census, the village's population was 27 in seven households. The village did not appear in the following census of 2011. The 2016 census again measured the population as below the reporting threshold.
