= Qeshlaq-e Sadi Kandi =

Village in Ardabil province, Iran

Qeshlaq-e Sadi Kandi Persian: قشلاق سدي كندي
- Village
- Location within Iran
- Coordinates: 39°18′31″N 48°01′00″E
- Country: Iran
- Province: Ardabil
- County: Bileh Savar
- District: Qeshlaq Dasht
- Rural District: Qeshlaq-e Jonubi

Population (2016)
  - Total: 29
- Time zone: UTC+3:30 (IRST)

Qeshlaq-e Sadi Kandi (Persian: قشلاق سدي كندي) (Note: Also romanized as Qeshlāq-e Sadī Kandī) is a village in Qeshlaq-e Jonubi Rural District of Qeshlaq Dasht District in Bileh Savar County, Ardabil province, Iran.

== Demographics ==
=== Population ===
At the time of the 2006 National Census, the village's population was 35 in nine households. The following census in 2011 counted 12 people in four households. The 2016 census measured the population of the village as 29 people in 10 households.
