= Nuli Bolagh =

Village in Ardabil province, Iran

Nuli Bolagh Persian: نولي بلاغ
- Village
- Location within Iran
- Coordinates: 38°46′22″N 47°38′40″E
- Country: Iran
- Province: Ardabil
- County: Meshgin Shahr
- District: Moradlu
- Rural District: Arshaq-e Gharbi

Population (2016)
  - Total: 214
- Time zone: UTC+3:30 (IRST)

Nuli Bolagh (Persian: نولي بلاغ) (Note: Also romanized as Nūlī Bolāgh; also known as Nūlī Bolāghī and Nūly Bolāghī) is a village in Arshaq-e Gharbi Rural District of Moradlu District in Meshgin Shahr County, Ardabil province, Iran.

== Demographics ==
=== Population ===
At the time of the 2006 National Census, the village's population was 199 in 37 households. The following census in 2011 counted 194 people in 43 households. The 2016 census measured the population of the village as 214 people in 54 households.
