= Qeshlaq-e Hajj Aqa Nasir Owgholu =

Village in Ardabil province, Iran

Qeshlaq-e Hajj Aqa Nasir Owgholu Persian: قشلاق حاج اقانصيراوغلو
- Village
- Location within Iran
- Country: Iran
- Province: Ardabil
- County: Bileh Savar
- District: Qeshlaq Dasht
- Rural District: Qeshlaq-e Jonubi

Population (2016)
  - Total: 12
- Time zone: UTC+3:30 (IRST)

Qeshlaq-e Hajj Aqa Nasir Owgholu (Persian: قشلاق حاج اقانصيراوغلو) (Note: Also romanized as Qeshlāq-e Ḩājj Āqā Naṣīr Ougholū; also known as Qeshlāq-e Ḩājj Āqā) is a village in Qeshlaq-e Jonubi Rural District of Qeshlaq Dasht District in Bileh Savar County, Ardabil province, Iran.

== Demographics ==
=== Population ===
At the time of the 2006 National Census, the village's population was 19 in four households. The following census in 2011 counted a population below the reporting threshold. The 2016 census again measured the population as 12 people in four households.
