= Qeshlaq-e Gurchinlu Hajj Beyuk =

Village in Ardabil province, Iran

Qeshlaq-e Gurchinlu Hajj Beyuk Persian: قشلاق گورچينلوحاج بيوك
- Village
- Location within Iran
- Coordinates: 39°19′45″N 47°49′42″E
- Country: Iran
- Province: Ardabil
- County: Bileh Savar
- District: Qeshlaq Dasht
- Rural District: Qeshlaq-e Jonubi

Population (2016)
  - Total: 64
- Time zone: UTC+3:30 (IRST)

Qeshlaq-e Gurchinlu Hajj Beyuk (Persian: قشلاق گورچينلوحاج بيوك) (Note: Also romanized as Qeshlāq-e Gurchīnlū Ḩājj Beyūk) is a village in Qeshlaq-e Jonubi Rural District of Qeshlaq Dasht District in Bileh Savar County, Ardabil province, Iran.

== Demographics ==
=== Population ===
At the time of the 2006 National Census, the village's population was 61 in 14 households. The following census in 2011 counted 66 people in 18 households. The 2016 census again measured the population as 64 people in 20 households.
