= Qeshlaq-e Seyyedlari Sari Quyi Moradlu =

Village in Ardabil province, Iran

Qeshlaq-e Seyyedlari Sari Quyi Moradlu Persian: قشلاق سيدلري ساري قوئي مرادلو
- Village
- Location within Iran
- Coordinates: 39°16′27″N 47°42′20″E
- Country: Iran
- Province: Ardabil
- County: Bileh Savar
- District: Qeshlaq Dasht
- Rural District: Qeshlaq-e Jonubi

Population (2016)
  - Total: Below reporting threshold
- Time zone: UTC+3:30 (IRST)

Qeshlaq-e Seyyedlari Sari Quyi Moradlu (Persian: قشلاق سيدلري ساري قوئي مرادلو) (Note: Also romanized as Qeshlāq-e Seyyedlarī Sārī Qūyī Morādlū) is a village in Qeshlaq-e Jonubi Rural District of Qeshlaq Dasht District in Bileh Savar County, Ardabil province, Iran.

== Demographics ==
=== Population ===
At the time of the 2006 National Census, the village's population was 31 in seven households. The village did not appear in the following census of 2011. The 2016 census measured the population as below the reporting threshold.
