= Qeshlaq-e Qarah Kakil Matleb =

Village in Ardabil province, Iran

Qeshlaq-e Qarah Kakil Matleb Persian: قشلاق قره ككيل حاجي مطلب
- Village
- Location within Iran
- Coordinates: 39°20′43″N 47°49′45″E
- Country: Iran
- Province: Ardabil
- County: Bileh Savar
- District: Qeshlaq Dasht
- Rural District: Qeshlaq-e Jonubi

Population (2016)
  - Total: 135
- Time zone: UTC+3:30 (IRST)

Qeshlaq-e Qarah Kakil Matleb (Persian: قشلاق قره ككيل حاجي مطلب) (Note: Also romanized as Qeshlāq-e Qarah Kakīl Ḩājjī Maṭleb) is a village in Qeshlaq-e Jonubi Rural District of Qeshlaq Dasht District in Bileh Savar County, Ardabil province, Iran.

== Demographics ==
=== Population ===
At the time of the 2006 National Census, the village's population was 87 in 15 households. The following census in 2011 counted 93 people in 29 households. The 2016 census measured the population as 135 people in 46 households.
