= Shurgol, Meshgin Shahr =

Village in Ardabil province, Iran

Shurgol Persian: شورگل
- Village
- Location within Iran
- Coordinates: 38°37′52″N 47°56′31″E
- Country: Iran
- Province: Ardabil
- County: Meshgin Shahr
- District: Arshaq
- Rural District: Arshaq-e Shomali

Population (2016)
  - Total: 120
- Time zone: UTC+3:30 (IRST)

Shurgol (Persian: شورگل) (Note: Also romanized as Shūrgol) is a village in Arshaq-e Shomali Rural District of Arshaq District in Meshgin Shahr County, Ardabil province, Iran.

== Demographics ==
=== Population ===
At the time of the 2006 National Census, the village's population was 188 in 38 households. The following census in 2011 counted 162 people in 41 households. The 2016 census measured the population of the village as 120 people in 42 households.
