= Qeshlaq-e Faraj Hajj Owraj =

Village in Ardabil province, Iran

Qeshlaq-e Faraj Hajj Owraj Persian: قشلاق فرج حاج اورج
- Village
- Location within Iran
- Coordinates: 39°19′39″N 47°46′11″E
- Country: Iran
- Province: Ardabil
- County: Bileh Savar
- District: Qeshlaq Dasht
- Rural District: Qeshlaq-e Jonubi

Population (2016)
  - Total: 21
- Time zone: UTC+3:30 (IRST)

Qeshlaq-e Faraj Hajj Owraj (Persian: قشلاق فرج حاج اورج) (Note: Also romanized as Qeshlāq-e Faraj Ḩājj Owraj; also known as Faraj Qeshlāq) is a village in Qeshlaq-e Jonubi Rural District of Qeshlaq Dasht District in Bileh Savar County, Ardabil province, Iran.

== Demographics ==
=== Population ===
At the time of the 2006 National Census, the village's population was 43 in 10 households. The following census in 2011 counted 31 people in six households. The 2016 census measured the population as 21 people in six households.
