= Qeshlaq-e Qarah Kakil Ayaz =

Village in Ardabil province, Iran

Qeshlaq-e Qarah Kakil Ayaz Persian: قشلاق قره ككيل اياز
- Village
- Location within Iran
- Country: Iran
- Province: Ardabil
- County: Bileh Savar
- District: Qeshlaq Dasht
- Rural District: Qeshlaq-e Jonubi

Population (2016)
  - Total: 28
- Time zone: UTC+3:30 (IRST)

Qeshlaq-e Qarah Kakil Ayaz (Persian: قشلاق قره ككيل اياز) (Note: Also romanized as Qeshlāq-e Qarah Kakīl Āyāz) is a village in Qeshlaq-e Jonubi Rural District of Qeshlaq Dasht District in Bileh Savar County, Ardabil province, Iran.

== Demographics ==
=== Population ===
At the time of the 2006 National Census, the village's population was 26 in six households. The following census in 2011 counted 25 people in seven households. The 2016 census measured the population as 28 people in eight households.
