= Qeshlaq-e Owrtadagh-e Hajjiabad =

Village in Ardabil province, Iran

Qeshlaq-e Owrtadagh-e Hajjiabad Persian: قشلاق اورتاداغ حاجي عباد
- Village
- Location within Iran
- Country: Iran
- Province: Ardabil
- County: Bileh Savar
- District: Qeshlaq Dasht
- Rural District: Qeshlaq-e Jonubi

Population (2016)
  - Total: Below reporting threshold
- Time zone: UTC+3:30 (IRST)

Qeshlaq-e Owrtadagh-e Hajjiabad (Persian: قشلاق اورتاداغ حاجي عباد) (Note: Also romanized as Qeshlāq-e Owrtādāgh-e Ḩājjīābād) is a village in Qeshlaq-e Jonubi Rural District of Qeshlaq Dasht District in Bileh Savar County, Ardabil province, Iran.

== Demographics ==
=== Population ===
At the time of the 2006 National Census, the village's population was 16 in five households. The following census in 2011 counted 19 people in seven households. The 2016 census measured the population as below the reporting threshold.
