= Qeshlaq-e Ayan Ali Samad =

Village in Ardabil province, Iran

Qeshlaq-e Ayan Ali Samad Persian: قشلاق اينالي صمد
- Village
- Country: Iran
- Province: Ardabil
- County: Bileh Savar
- District: Qeshlaq Dasht
- Rural District: Qeshlaq-e Jonubi

Population (2016)
  - Total: 56
- Time zone: UTC+3:30 (IRST)

Qeshlaq-e Ayan Ali Samad (Persian: قشلاق اينالي صمد) (Note: Also romanized as Qeshlāq-e Ayan Alī Şamad) is a village in Qeshlaq-e Jonubi Rural District of Qeshlaq Dasht District in Bileh Savar County, Ardabil province, Iran.

== Demographics ==
=== Population ===
At the time of the 2006 National Census, the village's population was 55 in 12 households. The following census in 2011 counted 53 people in 15 households. The 2016 census measured the population of the village as 56 people in 16 households.
