= Qeshlaq-e Owrtadagh-e Tapaduq =

Village in Ardabil province, Iran

Qeshlaq-e Owrtadagh-e Tapaduq Persian: قشلاق اورتاداغ تاپدوق
- Village
- Location within Iran
- Coordinates: 39°17′30″N 47°53′05″E
- Country: Iran
- Province: Ardabil
- County: Bileh Savar
- District: Qeshlaq Dasht
- Rural District: Qeshlaq-e Jonubi

Population (2016)
  - Total: 43
- Time zone: UTC+3:30 (IRST)

Qeshlaq-e Owrtadagh-e Tapaduq (Persian: قشلاق اورتاداغ تاپدوق) (Note: Also romanized as Qeshlāq-e Owrtādāgh-e Tāpadūq) is a village in Qeshlaq-e Jonubi Rural District of Qeshlaq Dasht District in Bileh Savar County, Ardabil province, Iran.

== Demographics ==
=== Population ===
At the time of the 2006 National Census, the village's population was 31 in eight households. The following census in 2011 counted 33 people in seven households. The 2016 census measured the population of the village as 43 people in 10 households.
