= Qeshlaq-e Aji Eshmeh-ye Papur =

Village in Ardabil province, Iran

Qeshlaq-e Aji Eshmeh-ye Papur Persian: قشلاق اجی اشمه پاپور
- Village
- Country: Iran
- Province: Ardabil
- County: Bileh Savar
- District: Qeshlaq Dasht
- Rural District: Qeshlaq-e Jonubi

Population (2016)
  - Total: 24
- Time zone: UTC+3:30 (IRST)

Qeshlaq-e Aji Eshmeh-ye Papur (Persian: قشلاق اجی اشمه پاپور) (Note: Also romanized as Qeshlāq-e Ājī Eshmeh-ye Pāpūr) is a village in Qeshlaq-e Jonubi Rural District of Qeshlaq Dasht District in Bileh Savar County, Ardabil province, Iran.

== Demographics ==
=== Population ===
At the time of the 2006 National Census, the village's population was 13 in four households. The following census in 2011 counted 25 people in six households. The 2016 census measured the population of the village as 24 people in five households.
