= Qeshlaq-e Seyyedlar Dadalu Yidallah =

Village in Ardabil province, Iran

Qeshlaq-e Seyyedlar Dadalu Yidallah Persian: قشلاق سيدلردادلويداله
- Village
- Location within Iran
- Coordinates: 39°16′33″N 47°45′49″E
- Country: Iran
- Province: Ardabil
- County: Bileh Savar
- District: Qeshlaq Dasht
- Rural District: Qeshlaq-e Jonubi

Population (2016)
  - Total: 15
- Time zone: UTC+3:30 (IRST)

Qeshlaq-e Seyyedlar Dadalu Yidallah (Persian: قشلاق سيدلردادلويداله) (Note: Also romanized as Qeshlāq-e Seyyedlar Dādalū Yīdāllah) is a village in Qeshlaq-e Jonubi Rural District of Qeshlaq Dasht District in Bileh Savar County, Ardabil province, Iran.

== Demographics ==
=== Population ===
At the time of the 2006 National Census, the village's population was 18 in five households. The following census in 2011 counted 27 people in eight households. The 2016 census measured the population as 15 people in four households.
