= Qeshlaq-e Damirchluy-e Qarah Qeshlaq-e Hajj Abil =

Village in Ardabil province, Iran

Qeshlaq-e Damirchluy-e Qarah Qeshlaq-e Hajj Abil Persian: قشلاق دميرچلوي قره قشلاق حاج ابيل
- Village
- Location within Iran
- Country: Iran
- Province: Ardabil
- County: Bileh Savar
- District: Qeshlaq Dasht
- Rural District: Qeshlaq-e Jonubi

Population (2016)
  - Total: 59
- Time zone: UTC+3:30 (IRST)

Qeshlaq-e Damirchluy-e Qarah Qeshlaq-e Hajj Abil (Persian: قشلاق دميرچلوي قره قشلاق حاج ابيل) (Note: Also romanized as Qeshlāq-e Damīrchlūy-e Qarah Qeshlāq-e Ḩājj Ābīl; also known as Damīrchīlū-ye Qarah Qeshlāq) is a village in Qeshlaq-e Jonubi Rural District of Qeshlaq Dasht District in Bileh Savar County, Ardabil province, Iran.

== Demographics ==
=== Population ===
At the time of the 2006 National Census, the village's population was 145 in 30 households. The following census in 2011 counted 76 people in 19 households. The 2016 census measured the population of the village as 59 people in 18 households.
