= Qeshlaq-e Gurchinlu Hajj Najaf =

Village in Ardabil province, Iran

Qeshlaq-e Gurchinlu Hajj Najaf Persian: قشلاق گورچينلوحاج نجف
- Village
- Location within Iran
- Coordinates: 39°20′03″N 47°50′09″E
- Country: Iran
- Province: Ardabil
- County: Bileh Savar
- District: Qeshlaq Dasht
- Rural District: Qeshlaq-e Jonubi

Population (2016)
  - Total: 153
- Time zone: UTC+3:30 (IRST)

Qeshlaq-e Gurchinlu Hajj Najaf (Persian: قشلاق گورچينلوحاج نجف) (Note: Also romanized as Qeshlāq-e Gūrčīnlū Ḩājj Najaf) is a village in Qeshlaq-e Jonubi Rural District of Qeshlaq Dasht District in Bileh Savar County, Ardabil province, Iran.

== Demographics ==
=== Population ===
At the time of the 2006 National Census, the village's population was 153 in 31 households. The following census in 2011 counted 144 people in 37 households. The 2016 census measured the population of the village as 153 people in 48 households.
