= Qeshlaq-e Damirchluy-e Qarah Qeshlaq-e Hajj Majid =

Village in Ardabil province, Iran

Qeshlaq-e Damirchluy-e Qarah Qeshlaq-e Hajj Majid Persian: قشلاق دميرچلوي قره قشلاق حاج مجيد
- Village
- Location within Iran
- Country: Iran
- Province: Ardabil
- County: Bileh Savar
- District: Qeshlaq Dasht
- Rural District: Qeshlaq-e Jonubi

Population (2016)
  - Total: 10
- Time zone: UTC+3:30 (IRST)

Qeshlaq-e Damirchluy-e Qarah Qeshlaq-e Hajj Majid (Persian: قشلاق دميرچلوي قره قشلاق حاج مجيد) (Note: Also romanized as Qeshlāq-e Damīrchlūy-e Qarah Qeshlāq-e Ḩājj Majīd; also known as Damīrchīlū-ye Qeshlāq-e Ḩājj Majīd) is a village in Qeshlaq-e Jonubi Rural District of Qeshlaq Dasht District in Bileh Savar County, Ardabil province, Iran.

== Demographics ==
=== Population ===
At the time of the 2006 National Census, the village's population was 16 in five households. The following census in 2011 counted 19 people in five households. The 2016 census measured the population of the village as 10 people in four households.
