= Qeshlaq-e Seyyedlar Dadalu Hoseyn Ali =

Village in Ardabil province, Iran

Qeshlaq-e Seyyedlar Dadalu Hoseyn Ali Persian: قشلاق سيدلردادلوحسينعلي
- Village
- Location within Iran
- Coordinates: 39°16′42″N 47°46′32″E
- Country: Iran
- Province: Ardabil
- County: Bileh Savar
- District: Qeshlaq Dasht
- Rural District: Qeshlaq-e Jonubi

Population (2016)
  - Total: 17
- Time zone: UTC+3:30 (IRST)

Qeshlaq-e Seyyedlar Dadalu Hoseyn Ali (Persian: قشلاق سيدلردادلوحسينعلي) (Note: Also romanized as Qeshlāq-e Seyyedlar Dādalū Ḩoseyn ʿAlī) is a village in Qeshlaq-e Jonubi Rural District of Qeshlaq Dasht District in Bileh Savar County, Ardabil province, Iran.

== Demographics ==
=== Population ===
At the time of the 2006 National Census, the village's population was 31 in eight households. The following census in 2011 counted a population below the reporting threshold. The 2016 census measured the population as 27 people in six households.
