= Qeshlaq-e Ayan Ali Barat =

Village in Ardabil province, Iran

Qeshlaq-e Ayan Ali Barat Persian: قشلاق اینالی برات
- Village
- Country: Iran
- Province: Ardabil
- County: Bileh Savar
- District: Qeshlaq Dasht
- Rural District: Qeshlaq-e Jonubi

Population (2016)
  - Total: 140
- Time zone: UTC+3:30 (IRST)

Qeshlaq-e Ayan Ali Barat (Persian: قشلاق اینالی برات) (Note: Also romanized as Qeshlāq-e Ayan Alī Barāt) is a village in Qeshlaq-e Jonubi Rural District of Qeshlaq Dasht District in Bileh Savar County, Ardabil province, Iran.

== Demographics ==
=== Population ===
At the time of the 2006 National Census, the village's population was 139 in 29 households. The following census in 2011 counted 113 people in 28 households. The 2016 census measured the population of the village as 140 people in 41 households.
