= Qeshlaq-e Faraj Esmail =

Village in Ardabil province, Iran

Qeshlaq-e Faraj Esmail Persian: قشلاق فرج اسماعيل
- Village
- Location within Iran
- Coordinates: 39°20′02″N 47°46′23″E
- Country: Iran
- Province: Ardabil
- County: Bileh Savar
- District: Qeshlaq Dasht
- Rural District: Qeshlaq-e Jonubi

Population (2016)
  - Total: 28
- Time zone: UTC+3:30 (IRST)

Qeshlaq-e Faraj Esmail (Persian: قشلاق فرج اسماعيل) (Note: Also romanized as Qeshlāq-e Faraj Esmāʿīl) is a village in Qeshlaq-e Jonubi Rural District of Qeshlaq Dasht District in Bileh Savar County, Ardabil province, Iran.

== Demographics ==
=== Population ===
At the time of the 2006 National Census, the village's population was 20 in four households. The following census in 2011 counted a population below the reporting threshold. The 2016 census again measured the population as 28 people in five households.
