= Qeshlaq-e Faraj Moharram =

Village in Ardabil province, Iran

Qeshlaq-e Faraj Moharram Persian: قشلاق فرج محرم
- Village
- Location within Iran
- Coordinates: 39°19′51″N 47°46′19″E
- Country: Iran
- Province: Ardabil
- County: Bileh Savar
- District: Qeshlaq Dasht
- Rural District: Qeshlaq-e Jonubi

Population (2016)
  - Total: 26
- Time zone: UTC+3:30 (IRST)

Qeshlaq-e Faraj Moharram (Persian: قشلاق فرج محرم) (Note: Also romanized as Qeshlāq-e Faraj Moḥarram; also known as Faraj Qeshlāqī) is a village in Qeshlaq-e Jonubi Rural District of Qeshlaq Dasht District in Bileh Savar County, Ardabil province, Iran.

== Demographics ==
=== Population ===
At the time of the 2006 National Census, the village's population was 29 in seven households. The following census in 2011 counted 20 people in five households. The 2016 census again measured the population as 26 people in five households.
