= Qeshlaq-e Hezarat Qoli Bakhtiar =

Village in Ardabil province, Iran

Qeshlaq-e Hezarat Qoli Bakhtiar Persian: قشلاق حضرتقلي بختيار
- Village
- Location within Iran
- Coordinates: 39°17′48″N 47°48′34″E
- Country: Iran
- Province: Ardabil
- County: Bileh Savar
- District: Qeshlaq Dasht
- Rural District: Qeshlaq-e Jonubi

Population (2016)
  - Total: 21
- Time zone: UTC+3:30 (IRST)

Qeshlaq-e Hezarat Qoli Bakhtiar (Persian: قشلاق حضرتقلي بختيار) (Note: Also romanized as Qeshlāq-e Ḩez̤arat Qolī Bakhtīār) is a village in Qeshlaq-e Jonubi Rural District of Qeshlaq Dasht District in Bileh Savar County, Ardabil province, Iran.

== Demographics ==
=== Population ===
At the time of the 2006 National Census, the village's population was 57 in 12 households. The following census in 2011 counted 15 people in four households. The 2016 census again measured the population as 21 people in four households.
