= Qeshlaq-e Hezarat Qoli Abu ol Hasan =

Village in Ardabil province, Iran

Qeshlaq-e Hezarat Qoli Abu ol Hasan Persian: قشلاق حضرت قلي ابوالحسن
- Village
- Country: Iran
- Province: Ardabil
- County: Bileh Savar
- District: Qeshlaq Dasht
- Rural District: Qeshlaq-e Jonubi

Population (2016)
  - Total: Below reporting threshold
- Time zone: UTC+3:30 (IRST)

Qeshlaq-e Hezarat Qoli Abu ol Hasan (Persian: قشلاق حضرت قلي ابوالحسن) (Note: Also romanized as Qeshlāq-e Ḩez̤arat Qolī Abū ol Ḩasan) is a village in Qeshlaq-e Jonubi Rural District of Qeshlaq Dasht District in Bileh Savar County, Ardabil province, Iran.

== Demographics ==
=== Population ===
At the time of the 2006 National Census, the village's population was 16 in four households. The following census in 2011 counted 28 people in seven households. The 2016 census again measured the population as below the reporting threshold.
