= Qeshlaq-e Seyyedlar-e Seyfollah =

Village in Ardabil province, Iran

Qeshlaq-e Seyyedlar-e Seyfollah Persian: قشلاق سيدلرسيف اله
- Village
- Location within Iran
- Coordinates: 39°14′30″N 47°42′26″E
- Country: Iran
- Province: Ardabil
- County: Bileh Savar
- District: Qeshlaq Dasht
- Rural District: Qeshlaq-e Jonubi

Population (2016)
  - Total: 14
- Time zone: UTC+3:30 (IRST)

Qeshlaq-e Seyyedlar-e Seyfollah (Persian: قشلاق سيدلرسيف اله) (Note: Also romanized as Qeshlāq-e Seyyedlar-e Seyfollāh) is a village in Qeshlaq-e Jonubi Rural District of Qeshlaq Dasht District in Bileh Savar County, Ardabil province, Iran.

== Demographics ==
=== Population ===
At the time of the 2006 National Census, the village's population was 17 in five households. The following census in 2011 counted a population below the reporting threshold. The 2016 census measured the population as 14 people in four households.
