= Qeshlaq-e Owrtadagh-e Esmail =

Village in Ardabil province, Iran

Qeshlaq-e Owrtadagh-e Esmail Persian: قشلاق اورتاداغ اسماعيل
- Village
- Location within Iran
- Coordinates: 39°17′39″N 47°53′29″E
- Country: Iran
- Province: Ardabil
- County: Bileh Savar
- District: Qeshlaq Dasht
- Rural District: Qeshlaq-e Jonubi

Population (2016)
  - Total: 20
- Time zone: UTC+3:30 (IRST)

Qeshlaq-e Owrtadagh-e Esmail (Persian: قشلاق اورتاداغ اسماعيل) (Note: Also romanized as Qeshlāq-e Owrtādāgh-e Esmāʿīl; also known as Qeshlāq-e Gowmīr Chīnlū-ye Owrtādāgh and Qeshlāq-e Owrtādāgh) is a village in Qeshlaq-e Jonubi Rural District of Qeshlaq Dasht District in Bileh Savar County, Ardabil province, Iran.

== Demographics ==
=== Population ===
At the time of the 2006 National Census, the village's population was 66 in 17 households. The following census in 2011 counted a population below the reporting threshold. The 2016 census measured the population of the village as 20 people in six households.
