= Azadabad, Ardabil =

Village in Ardabil province, Iran

Azadabad Persian: ازاداباد
- Village
- Location within Iran
- Coordinates: 39°11′39″N 47°57′49″E
- Country: Iran
- Province: Ardabil
- County: Bileh Savar
- District: Qeshlaq Dasht
- Rural District: Qeshlaq-e Jonubi

Population (2016)
  - Total: 89
- Time zone: UTC+3:30 (IRST)

Azadabad (Persian: ازاداباد) (Note: Also romanized as Azādābād) is a village in Qeshlaq-e Jonubi Rural District of Qeshlaq Dasht District in Bileh Savar County, Ardabil province, Iran.

== Demographics ==
=== Population ===
At the time of the 2006 National Census, the village's population was 109 in 17 households. The following census in 2011 counted 97 people in 23 households. The 2016 census measured the population of the village as 89 people in 23 households.
