= Qeshlaq-e Hezarat Qoli Gholam =

Village in Ardabil province, Iran

Qeshlaq-e Hezarat Qoli Gholam Persian: قشلاق حضرتقلي غلام
- Village
- Location within Iran
- Coordinates: 39°17′14″N 47°49′39″E
- Country: Iran
- Province: Ardabil
- County: Bileh Savar
- District: Qeshlaq Dasht
- Rural District: Qeshlaq-e Jonubi

Population (2016)
  - Total: 15
- Time zone: UTC+3:30 (IRST)

Qeshlaq-e Hezarat Qoli Gholam (Persian: قشلاق حضرتقلي غلام) (Note: Also romanized as Qeshlāq-e Ḩez̤arat Qolī Gholām) is a village in Qeshlaq-e Jonubi Rural District of Qeshlaq Dasht District in Bileh Savar County, Ardabil province, Iran.

== Demographics ==
=== Population ===
At the time of the 2006 National Census, the village's population was 75 in 17 households. The following census in 2011 counted 25 people in six households. The 2016 census again measured the population as 15 people in six households.
