= Shur Gol, Bileh Savar =

Village in Ardabil province, Iran

Shur Gol Persian: شورگل
- Village
- Location within Iran
- Coordinates: 39°13′03″N 47°54′08″E
- Country: Iran
- Province: Ardabil
- County: Bileh Savar
- District: Qeshlaq Dasht
- Rural District: Qeshlaq-e Jonubi

Population (2016)
  - Total: 405
- Time zone: UTC+3:30 (IRST)

Shur Gol (Persian: شورگل) (Note: Also romanized as Shūr Gol) is a village in, and the capital of, Qeshlaq-e Jonubi Rural District in Qeshlaq Dasht District of Bileh Savar County, Ardabil province, Iran.

== Demographics ==
=== Population ===
At the time of the 2006 National Census, the village's population was 650 in 126 households. The following census in 2011 counted 641 people in 151 households. The 2016 census measured the population of the village as 405 people in 107 households. It was the most populous village in its rural district.
