= Qeshlaq-e Hezarat Qoli Abdollah =

Village in Ardabil province, Iran

Qeshlaq-e Hezarat Qoli Abdollah Persian: قشلاق حضرتقلي عبداله
- Village
- Location within Iran
- Coordinates: 39°17′30″N 47°49′07″E
- Country: Iran
- Province: Ardabil
- County: Bileh Savar
- District: Qeshlaq Dasht
- Rural District: Qeshlaq-e Jonubi

Population (2016)
  - Total: 39
- Time zone: UTC+3:30 (IRST)

Qeshlaq-e Hezarat Qoli Abdollah (Persian: قشلاق حضرتقلي عبداله) (Note: Also romanized as Qeshlāq-e Ḩez̤arat Qolī ʿAbdollah) is a village in Qeshlaq-e Jonubi Rural District of Qeshlaq Dasht District in Bileh Savar County, Ardabil province, Iran.

== Demographics ==
=== Population ===
At the time of the 2006 National Census, the village's population was 34 in eight households. The following census in 2011 counted 31 people in nine households. The 2016 census again measured the population as 39 people in 10 households.
