= Limlu, Ardabil =

Village in Ardabil province, Iran

Limlu Persian: ليملو
- Village
- Location within Iran
- Coordinates: 39°10′53″N 47°51′19″E
- Country: Iran
- Province: Ardabil
- County: Bileh Savar
- District: Qeshlaq Dasht
- Rural District: Qeshlaq-e Jonubi

Population (2016)
  - Total: 130
- Time zone: UTC+3:30 (IRST)

Limlu (Persian: ليملو) (Note: Also romanized as Līmlū; also known as Līmūlū) is a village in Qeshlaq-e Jonubi Rural District of Qeshlaq Dasht District in Bileh Savar County, Ardabil province, Iran.

== Demographics ==
=== Population ===
At the time of the 2006 National Census, the village's population was 125 in 26 households. The following census in 2011 counted 124 people in 31 households. The 2016 census measured the population of the village as 130 people in 34 households.
