= Qeshlaq-e Yilatan ol Hurdi Dowlat =

Village in Ardabil province, Iran

Qeshlaq-e Yilatan ol Hurdi Dowlat Persian: قشلاق یل اتان الهوردی دولت
- Village
- Location within Iran
- Coordinates: 39°18′43″N 47°43′35″E
- Country: Iran
- Province: Ardabil
- County: Bileh Savar
- District: Qeshlaq Dasht
- Rural District: Qeshlaq-e Jonubi

Population (2016)
  - Total: 20
- Time zone: UTC+3:30 (IRST)

Qeshlaq-e Yilatan ol Hurdi Dowlat (Persian: قشلاق یل اتان الهوردی دولت) (Note: Also romanized as Qeshlāq-e Yīlātān ol Hūrdī Dowlat) is a village in Qeshlaq-e Jonubi Rural District of Qeshlaq Dasht District in Bileh Savar County, Ardabil province, Iran.

== Demographics ==
=== Population ===
At the time of the 2006 National Census, the village's population was 24 in four households. The following census in 2011 counted a population below the reporting threshold. The 2016 census measured the population of the village as 20 people in five households.
