= Qeshlaq-e Qarah Kakil Hajji Mahmud =

Village in Ardabil province, Iran

Qeshlaq-e Qarah Kakil Hajji Mahmud Persian: قشلاق قره ككيل حاجي محمود
- Village
- Location within Iran
- Coordinates: 39°22′01″N 47°50′21″E
- Country: Iran
- Province: Ardabil
- County: Bileh Savar
- District: Qeshlaq Dasht
- Rural District: Qeshlaq-e Jonubi

Population (2016)
  - Total: 44
- Time zone: UTC+3:30 (IRST)

Qeshlaq-e Qarah Kakil Hajji Mahmud (Persian: قشلاق قره ككيل حاجي محمود) (Note: Also romanized as Qeshlāq-e Qarah Kakīl Ḩājjī Maḩmūd) is a village in Qeshlaq-e Jonubi Rural District of Qeshlaq Dasht District in Bileh Savar County, Ardabil province, Iran.

== Demographics ==
=== Population ===
At the time of the 2006 National Census, the village's population was 34 in six households. The following census in 2011 counted 46 people in nine households. The 2016 census measured the population as 44 people in nine households.
