= Qeshlaq-e Aji Eshmeh-ye Nurahmad =

Village in Ardabil province, Iran

Qeshlaq-e Aji Eshmeh-ye Nurahmad Persian: قشلاق اجی اشمه نوراحمد
- Village
- Location within Iran
- Country: Iran
- Province: Ardabil
- County: Bileh Savar
- District: Qeshlaq Dasht
- Rural District: Qeshlaq-e Jonubi

Population (2016)
  - Total: 44
- Time zone: UTC+3:30 (IRST)

Qeshlaq-e Aji Eshmeh-ye Nurahmad (Persian: قشلاق اجی اشمه نوراحمد) (Note: Also romanized as Qeshlāq-e Ājī Eshmeh-ye Nūrāḩmad) is a village in Qeshlaq-e Jonubi Rural District of Qeshlaq Dasht District in Bileh Savar County, Ardabil province, Iran.

== Demographics ==
=== Population ===
At the time of the 2006 National Census, the village's population was 34 in 10 households. The following census in 2011 counted 13 people in four households. The 2016 census again measured the population of the village 44 people in 13 households.
