= Qalghanlu =

Lake Qalghanlu
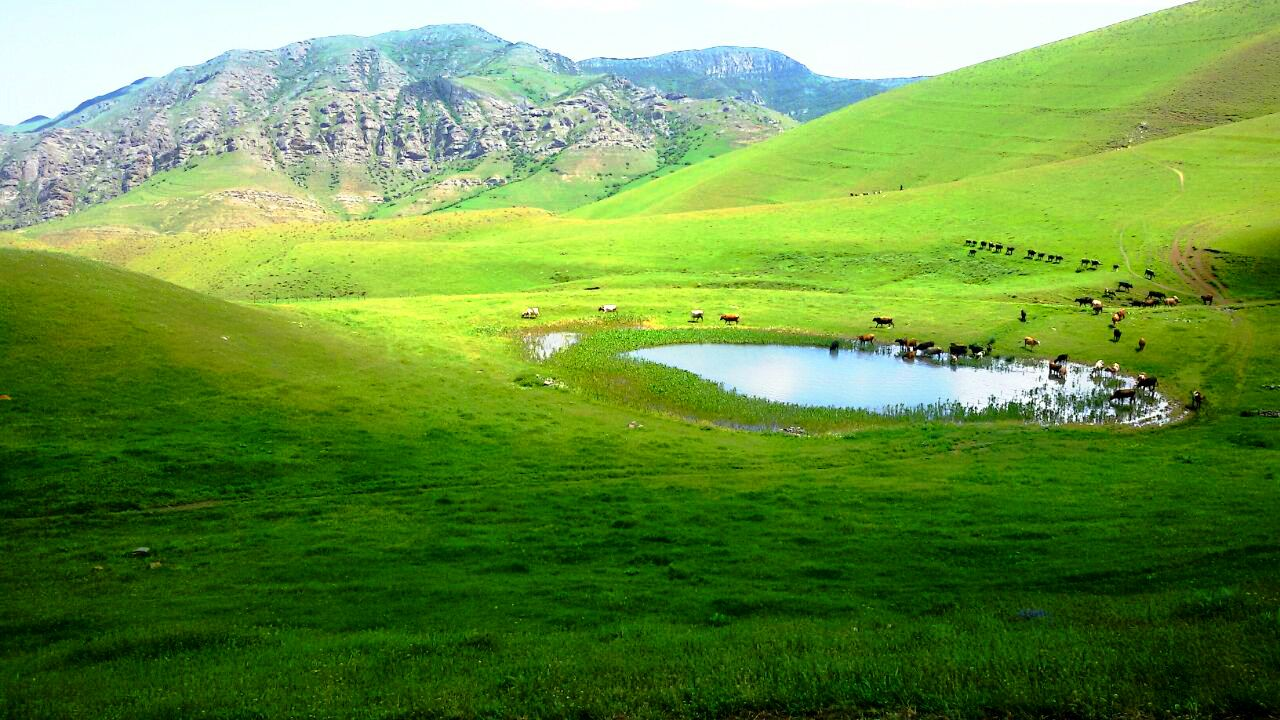
- From Khan Kandi, April 2000

- Location within Iran
- Interactive map of Lake Qalghanlu
- Coordinates: 38°55′15″N 48°03′35″E
- Type: Freshwater lake
- Primary inflows: Khan Kandi chai, Goshe dareh
- Primary outflows: none
- Catchment area: 51,000 m^{2} (0.020 sq mi)
- Basin countries: Iran
- Max. length: 70 m (0.043 mi)
- Max. width: 45 metres (148 ft)
- Surface area: 3,150 m^{2} (0 sq mi)
- Average depth: 1 m (3.3 ft)
- Max. depth: 1.5 m (4.9 ft)
- Water volume: 3,150 m^{3} (7.6×10^{−7} cu mi)
- Surface elevation: 1,672 m (5,486 ft)
- Settlements: Khan Kandi, Tulun, Iran, Germi

Lake Qalghanlu (Persian: Daryāĉe Qalghanlu, قالغانلو دریاچه, Daryāche-ye Khan Kandi; Qalghanlu gölü) is the smallest natural lake in Iranian Azerbaijan. The lake is between the Khan Kandi village of Germi and the Azerbaijani border, and west of the southern portion of the Caspian Sea.

== Specifications ==
Qalghanlo Lake has an approximate length of 70 meters and a width of 45 meters with an area of 3,150 square meters.

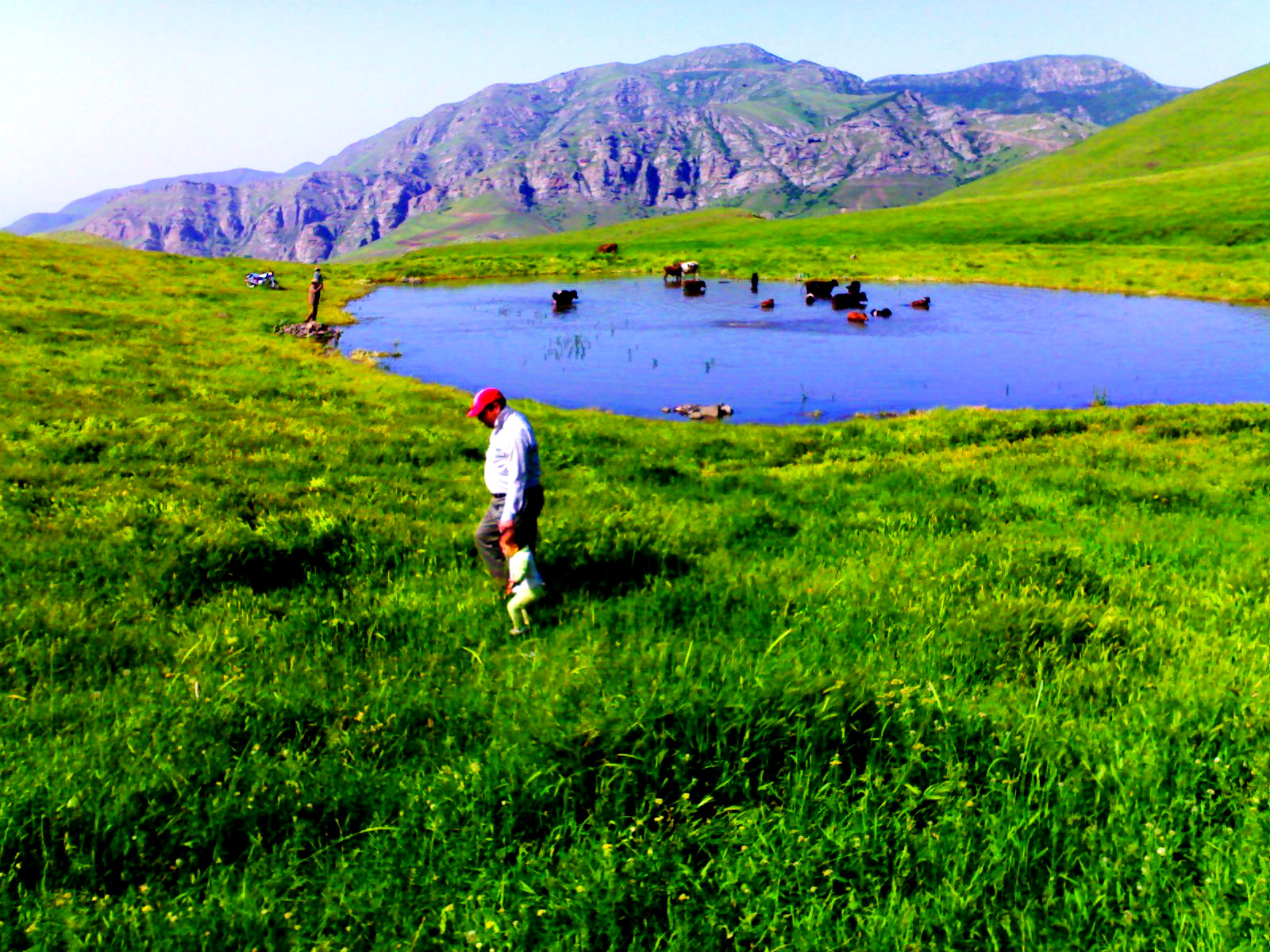
Qalghanlu lake near Khan Kandi village

== Gallery ==
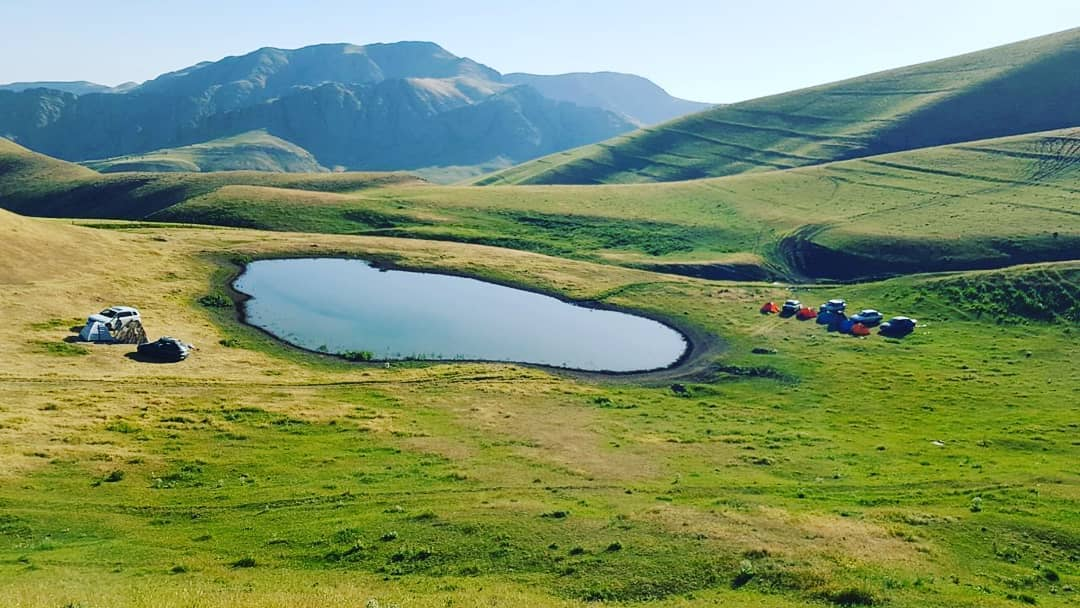

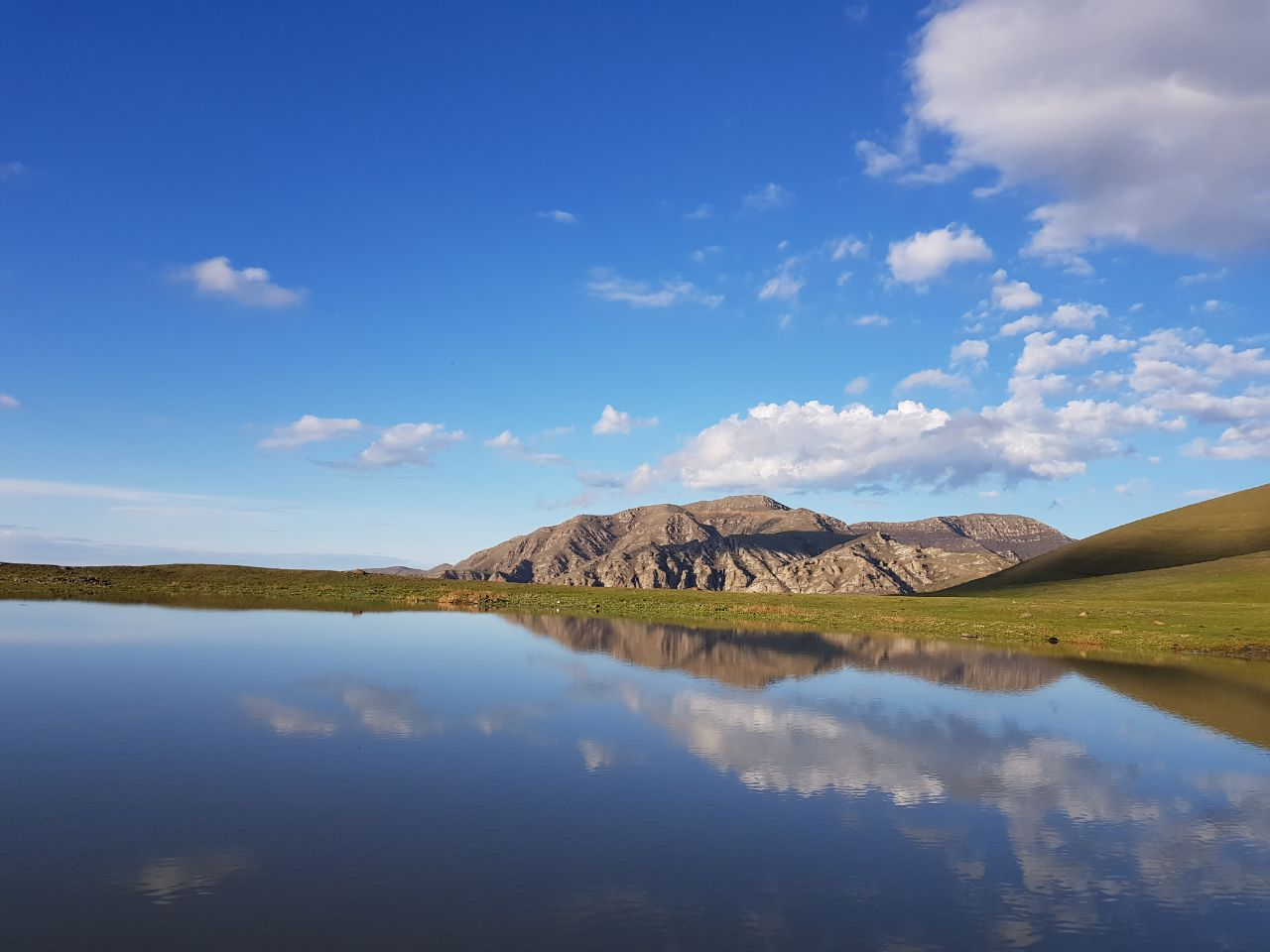

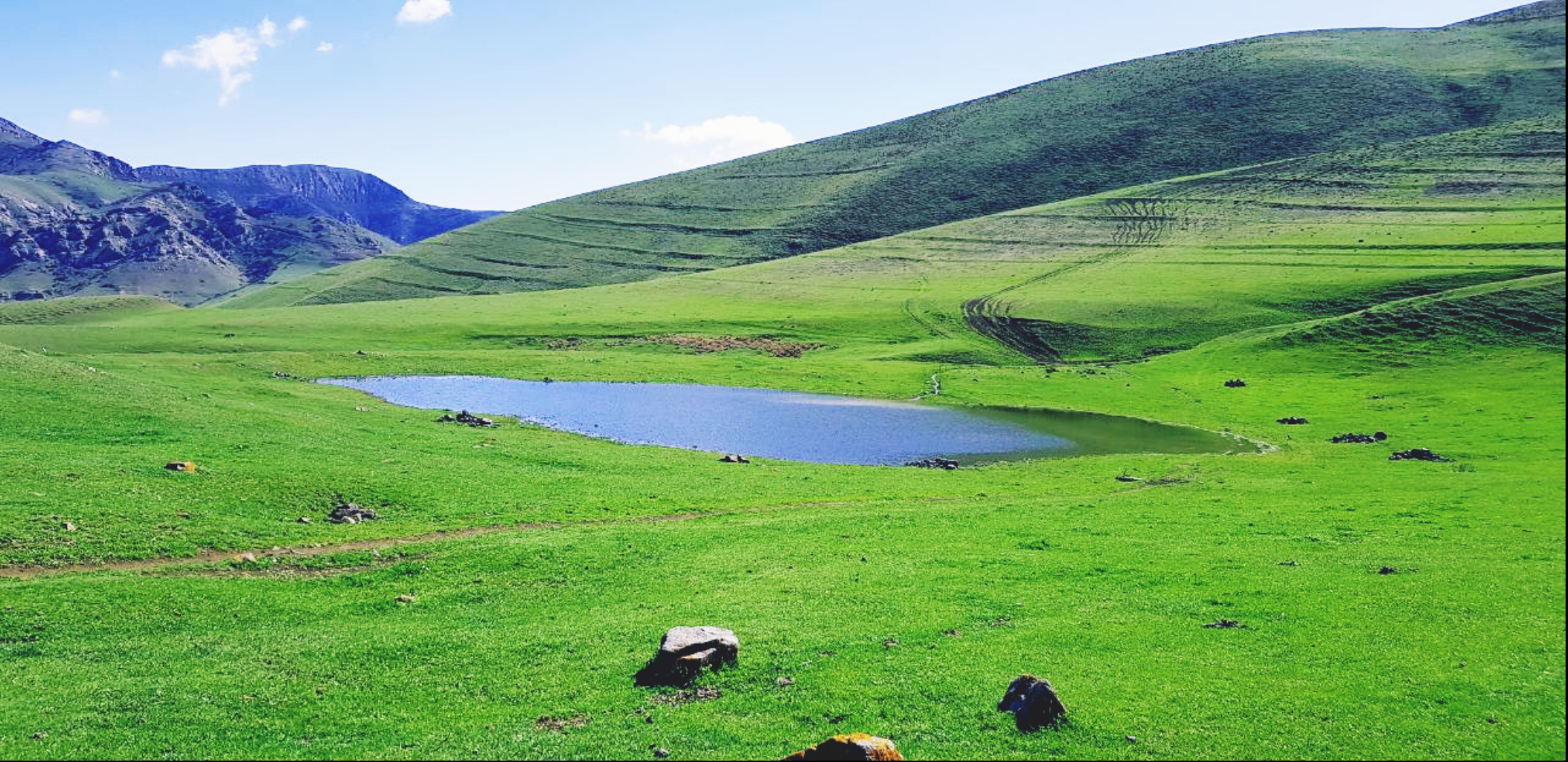

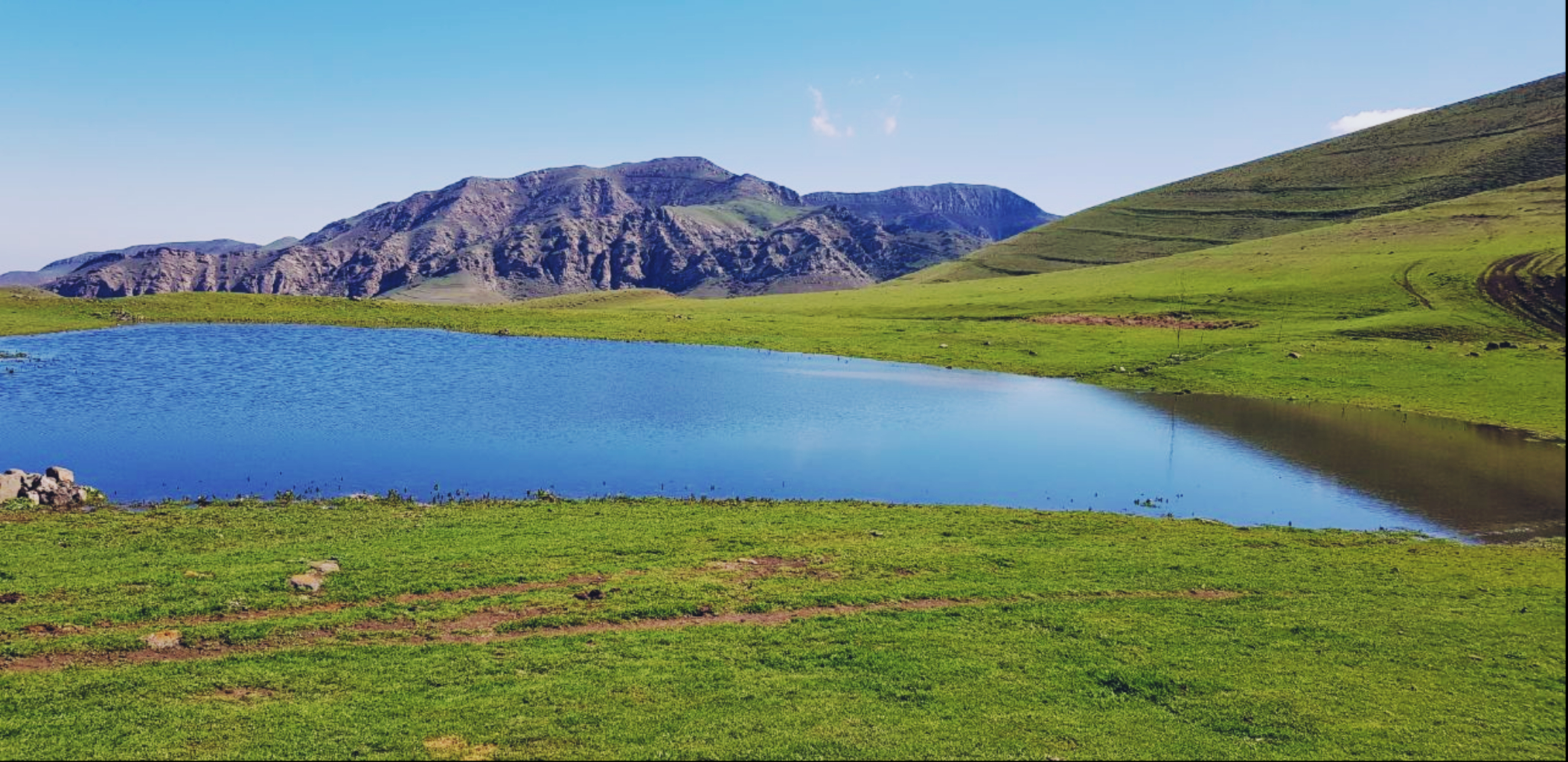

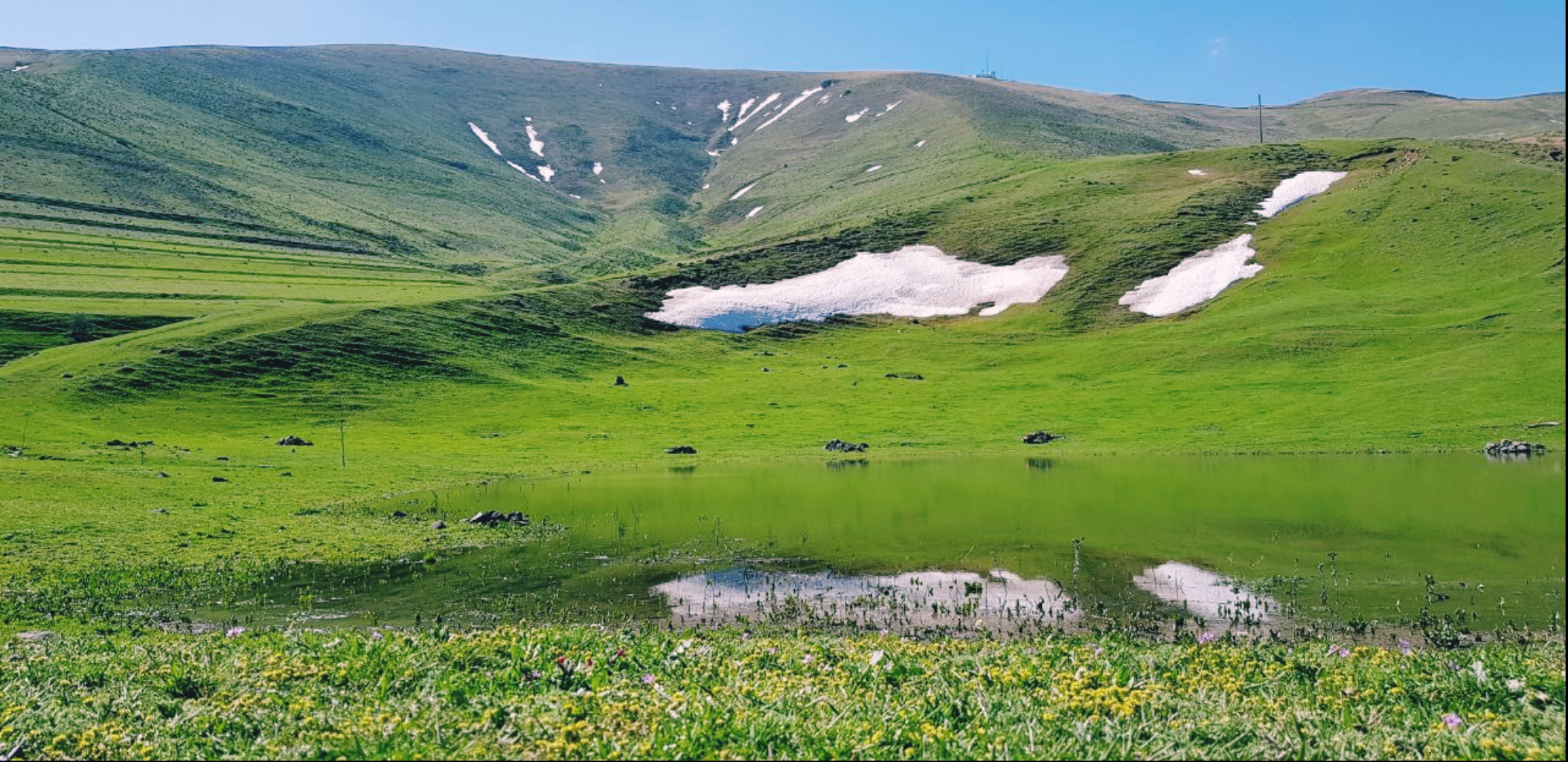

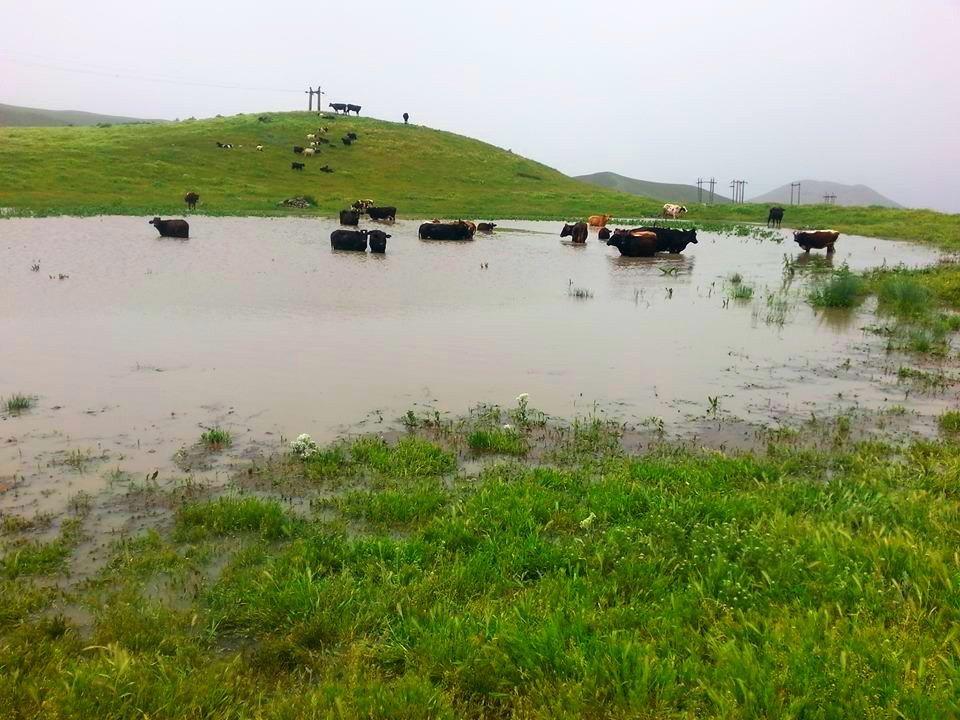

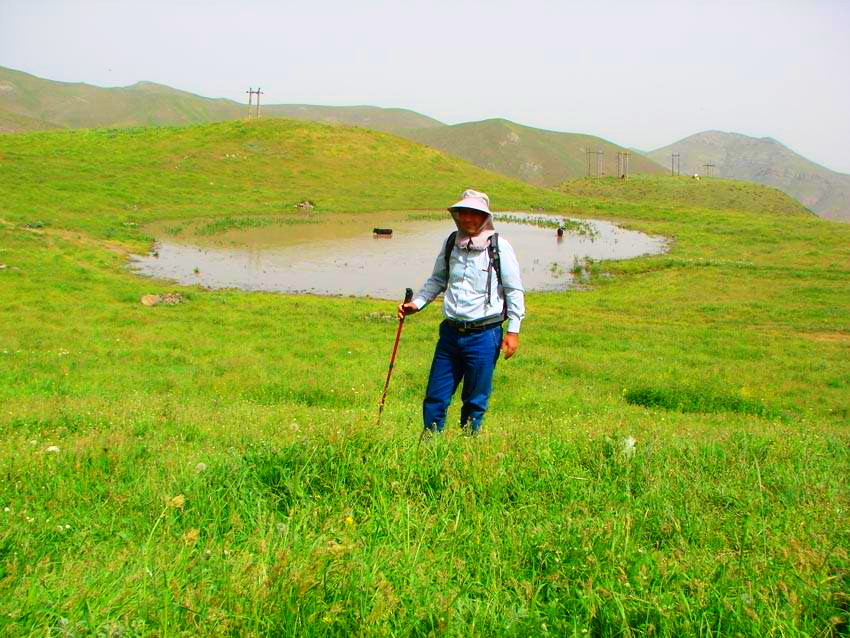

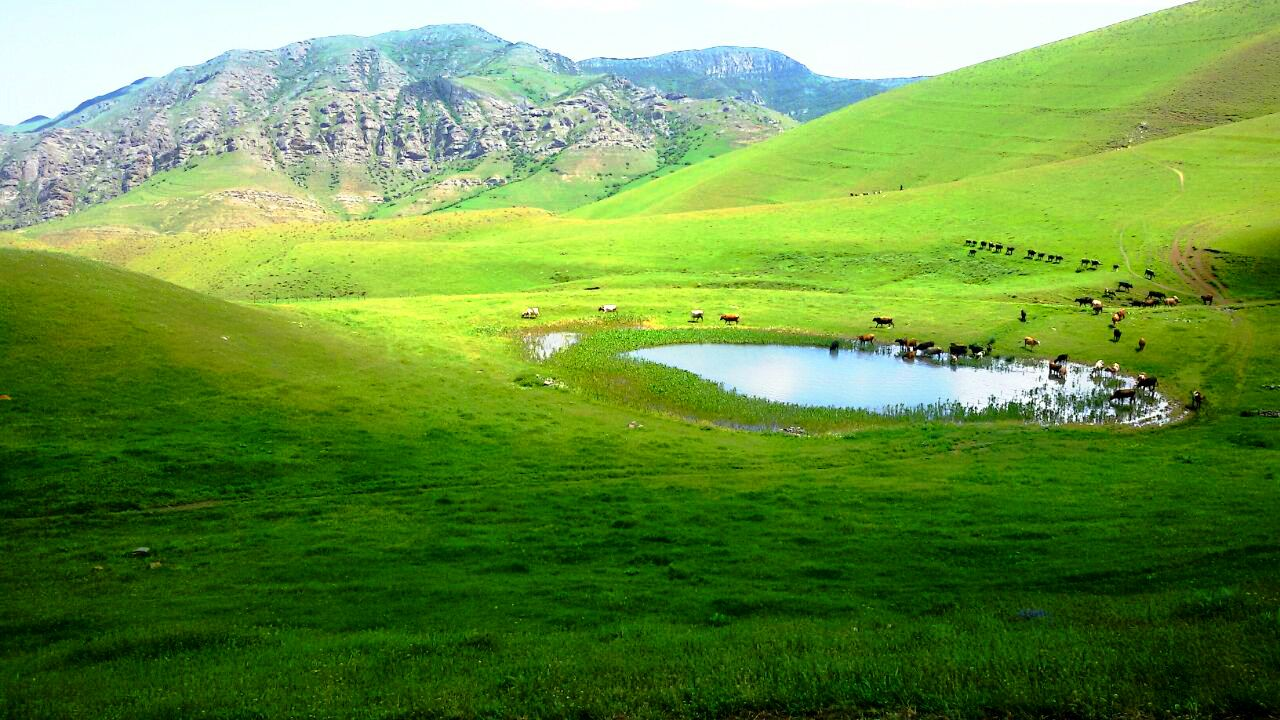

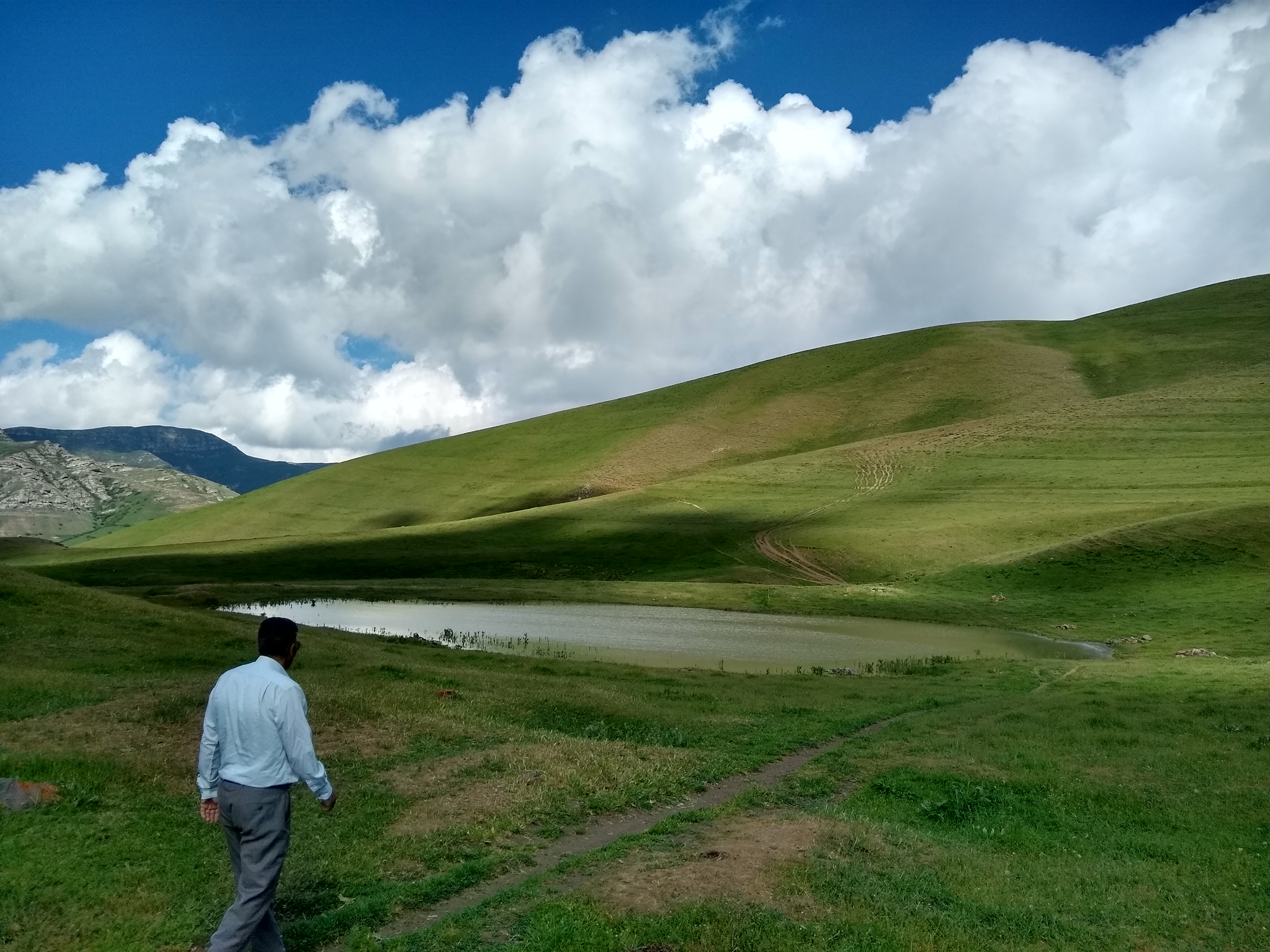

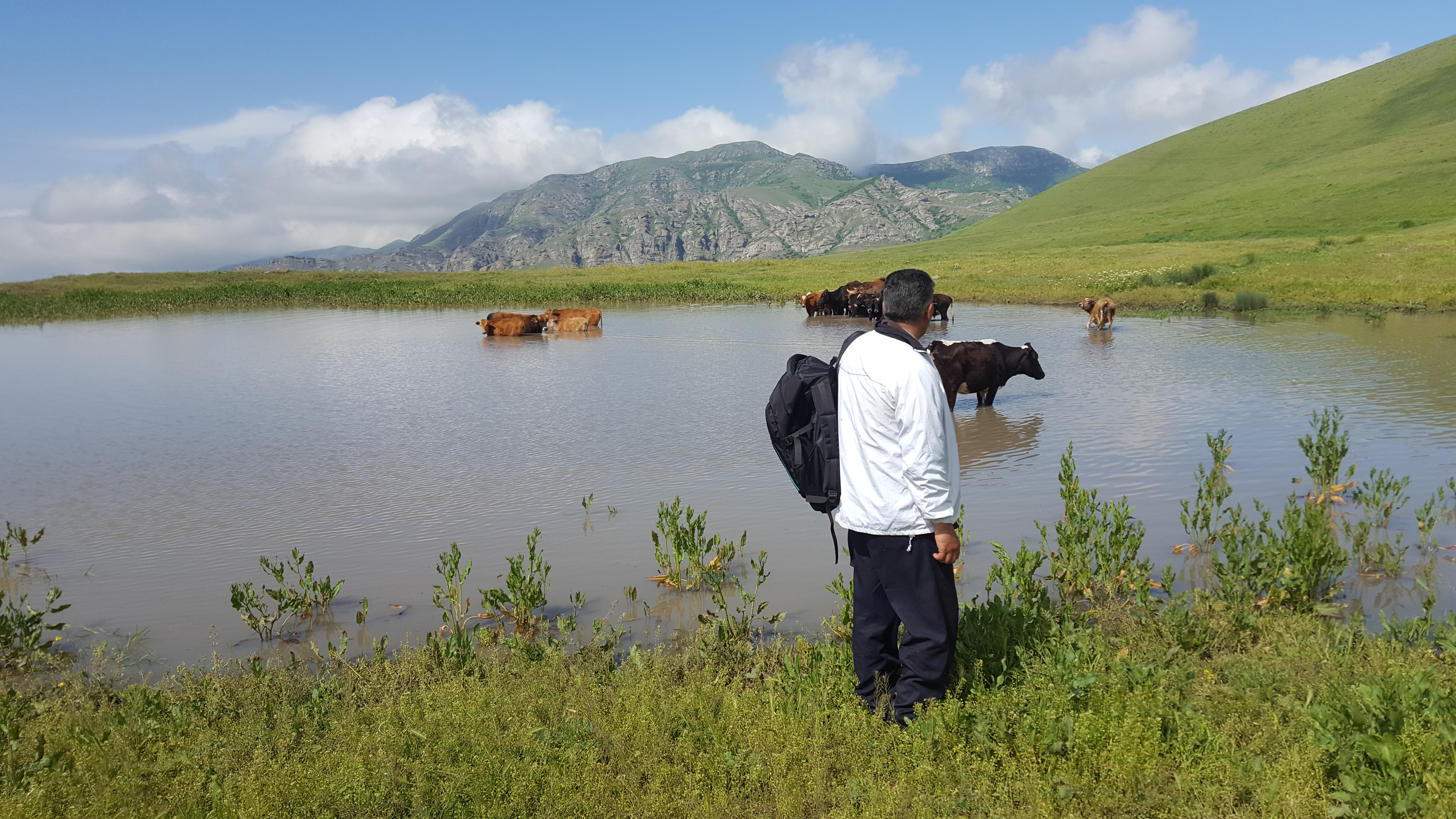

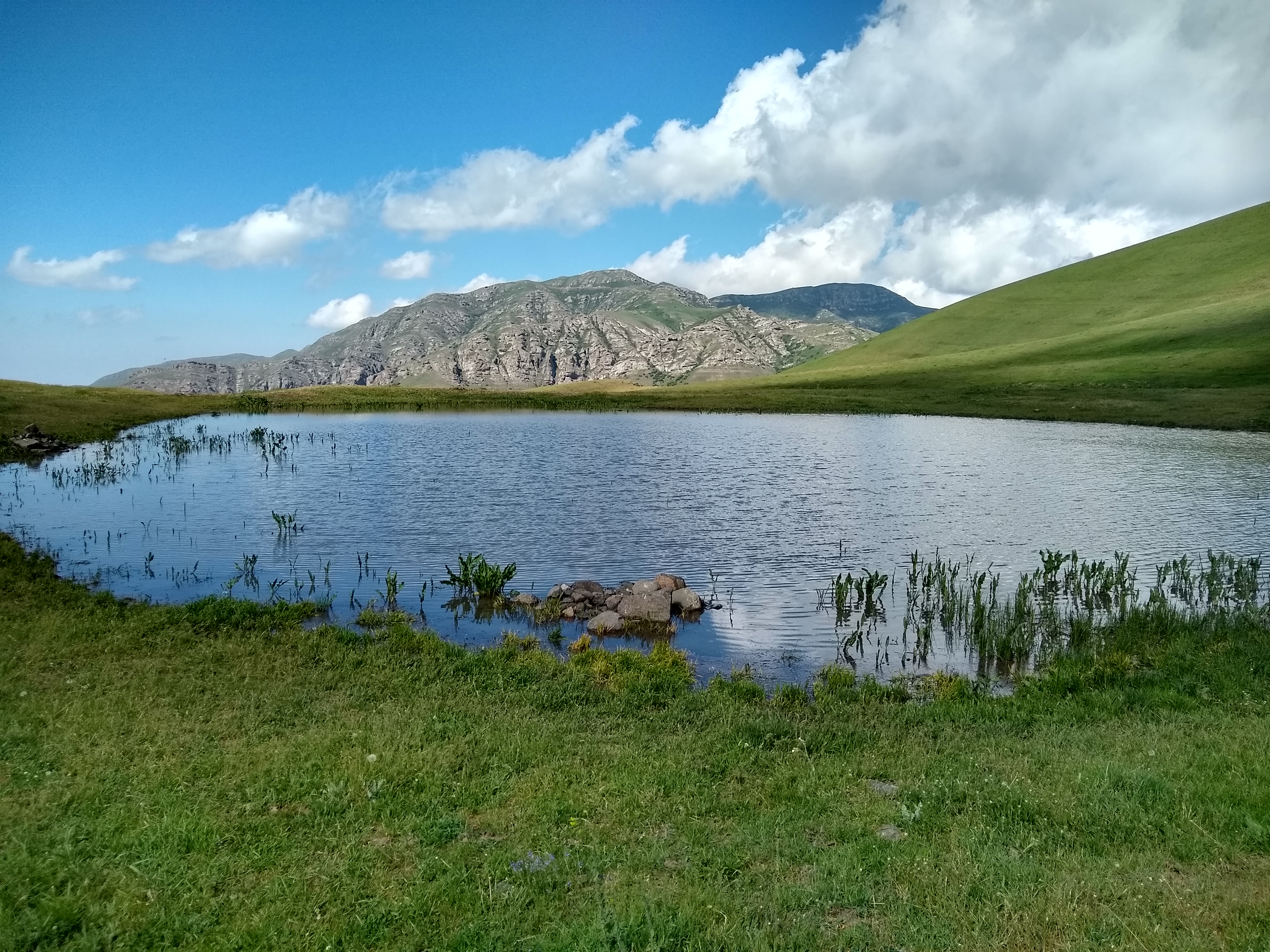

== Neighbors ==
- Tulun, Iran
- Khan Kandi
- Azizlu
