= Ilkhchi (disambiguation) =

Ilkhchi is a city in East Azerbaijan Province, Iran.

Ilkhchi or Ilkhechi (Persian: ايلخچي), also rendered as Ilchi or Ilkhchih or Ilikhchi, may also refer to various places in Iran:

- Ilkhchi, Ungut, Ardabil Province
- Ilkhchi, Kowsar, Ardabil Province
- Ilkhchi-ye Olya, Ardabil Province
- Ilkhchi-ye Sofla, Ardabil Province
- Ilkhechi, Hashtrud, East Azerbaijan Province
- Ilkhchi District, in East Azerbaijan Province
- Ilchi-ye Bala, Hormozgan Province

== See also ==
- Qeshlaq-e Ilkhchi (disambiguation)
