= Tulun, Iran =

Village in Ardabil province, Iran

Tulun Persian: تولون
- Village
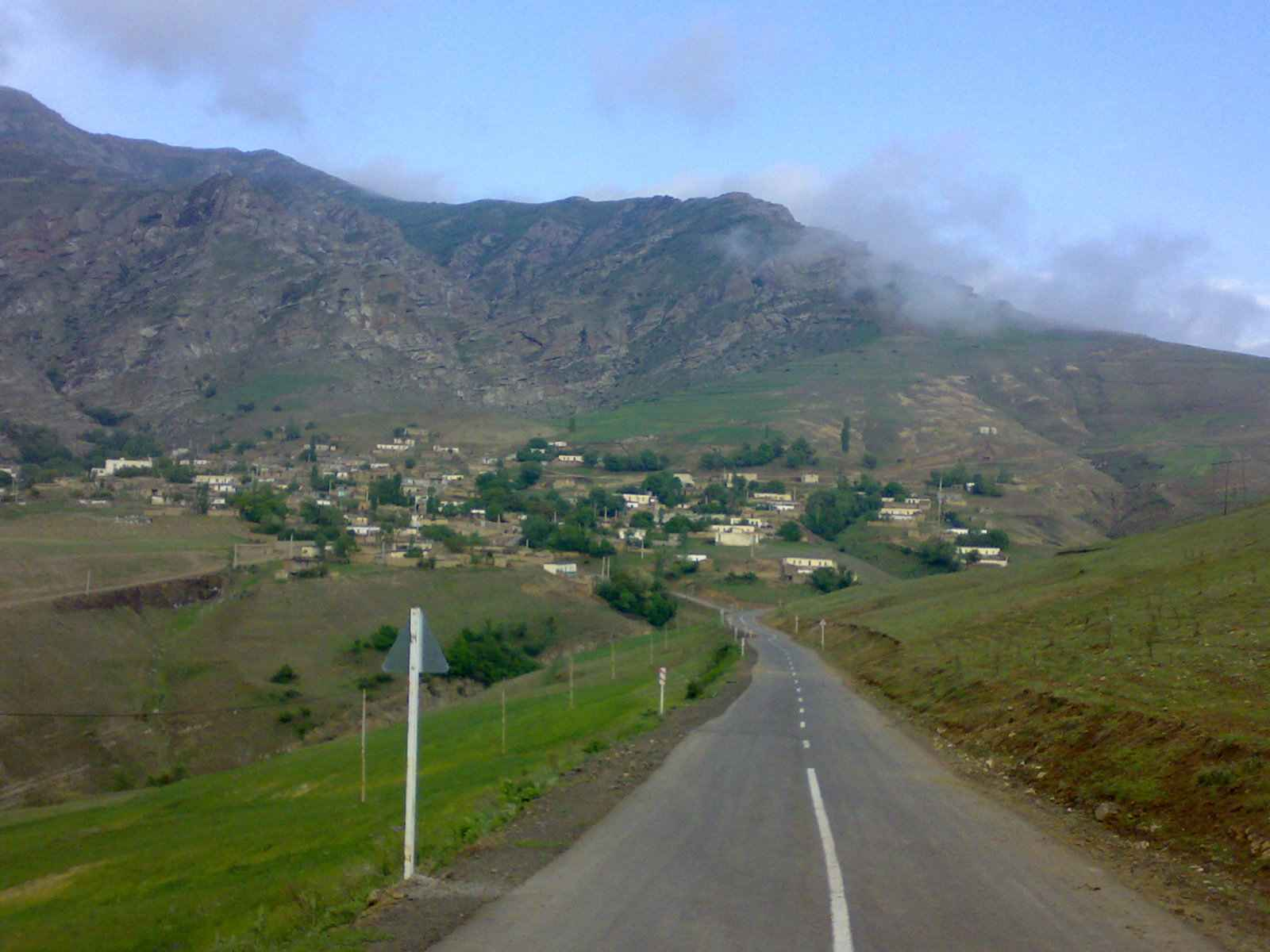
- The village of Tulun

- Location within Iran
- Coordinates: 38°56′42″N 48°03′58″E
- Country: Iran
- Province: Ardabil
- County: Germi
- District: Central
- Rural District: Ojarud-e Gharbi

Population (2016)
  - Total: 218
- Time zone: UTC+3:30 (IRST)

Tulun (Persian: تولون) (Note: Also romanized as Tūlūn) is a village in Ojarud-e Gharbi Rural District of the Central District in Germi County, (Note: Formerly Moghan County) Ardabil province, Iran.

== History ==
Tulun is considered one of the historically important villages of the Moghan plain and Ardabil province. The village enjoyed a certain reputation, especially during the rule of Nader Shah.

During World War II and the occupation of Iran by the Allies in September 1942, the Soviet Red Army, when crossing the borders of Tulun, encountered the resistance and hard defenses of its villagers, who were commanded by Mirjalil Khaghani; the enemy forces fled with heavy casualties.

== Demographics ==
=== Population ===
According to population and housing censuses of 1965, 1970, 1975, 1985, the village had 815, 667, 526, 336 people, and 133, 108, 106, 89 households, respectively.

At the time of the 2006 National Census, the village's population was 336 in 89 households. The following census in 2011 counted 275 people in 84 households. The 2016 census measured the population of the village as 218 people in 82 households.

== Economy and jobs ==
The village is suitable for livestock and agriculture, and as a result most of its inhabitants earn a living in raising livestock. Due to the high quality of the mountainous rangeland, livestock has taken precedence over agriculture. Horticulture and the cultivation of walnut trees, apples, plums, apricots, cherries and others are limited; however, Tulun is famous for its high-quality walnuts.

== Shabih Khani ==
At the time of the Ceremony of Sorrow (shabih khani), the eleventh day of Muharram, the village of Tulun enjoys a special reputation among the lovers of Imam Hussein, attracting a large group of people from all over the country every year. The ceremony is carried out by Sadat and the elders of Tulun.fa:تولون (اردبیل)

== Nearby villages ==
- Azizlu
- Khan Kandi
- Loskeh Daraq
- Owli Kandi
