= Chunzeh =

Chunzeh (Persian: چونزه) may refer to:

- Chunzeh-ye Olya
- Chunzeh-ye Sofla
