= Bashirlui =

Bashirlui (Persian: بشيرلوي), also rendered as Bashirlu, may refer to:

- Bashirlui-ye Olya
- Bashirlui-ye Sofla
