= Ojarud =

Ojarud (Persian: اجارود) may refer to:

- Ojarud-e Gharbi Rural District
- Ojarud-e Markazi Rural District
- Ojarud-e Sharqi Rural District
- Ojarud-e Shomali Rural District
