= Qarah Quch, Ardabil =

Village in Ardabil province, Iran

Qarah Quch Persian: قره‌قوچ
- Village
- Location within Iran
- Coordinates: 39°03′18″N 48°02′31″E
- Country: Iran
- Province: Ardabil
- County: Germi
- District: Central
- Rural District: Ojarud-e Gharbi

Population (2016)
  - Total: 221
- Time zone: UTC+3:30 (IRST)

Qarah Quch (Persian: قره‌قوچ) (Note: Also romanized as Qarah Qūch; also known as Ḩojjatābād (حجت‌آباد)) is a village in Ojarud-e Gharbi Rural District of the Central District in Germi County, (Note: Formerly Moghan County) Ardabil province, Iran.

== Demographics ==
=== Population ===
At the time of the 2006 National Census, the village's population was 216 in 43 households. The following census in 2011 counted 263 people in 62 households. The 2016 census measured the population of the village as 221 people in 56 households.
