= Dizaj, Ardabil =

Village in Ardabil province, Iran

Dizaj Persian: ديزج
- Village
- Location within Iran
- Coordinates: 39°02′00″N 47°58′31″E
- Country: Iran
- Province: Ardabil
- County: Germi
- District: Central
- Rural District: Ojarud-e Gharbi

Population (2016)
  - Total: 556
- Time zone: UTC+3:30 (IRST)

Dizaj (Persian: ديزج) (Note: Also romanized as Dīzaj; also known as Dizeh) is a village in, and the capital of, Ojarud-e Gharbi Rural District in the Central District of Germi County, (Note: Formerly Moghan County) Ardabil province, Iran.

== Demographics ==
=== Population ===
At the time of the 2006 National Census, the village's population was 761 in 163 households. The following census in 2011 counted 704 people in 193 households. The 2016 census measured the population of the village as 556 people in 180 households.
