= Majidlu =

Village in Ardabil province, Iran

Majidlu Persian: مجيدلو
- Village
- Location within Iran
- Coordinates: 39°01′08″N 48°00′17″E
- Country: Iran
- Province: Ardabil
- County: Germi
- District: Central
- Rural District: Ojarud-e Gharbi

Population (2016)
  - Total: 170
- Time zone: UTC+3:30 (IRST)

Majidlu (Persian: مجيدلو) (Note: Also romanized as Majīdlū) is a village in Ojarud-e Gharbi Rural District of the Central District in Germi County, (Note: Formerly Moghan County) Ardabil province, Iran.

== Demographics ==
=== Population ===
At the time of the 2006 National Census, the village's population was 244 in 54 households. The following census in 2011 counted 224 people in 54 households. The 2016 census measured the population of the village as 170 people in 48 households.
