= Chungenesh =

Village in Ardabil province, Iran

Chungenesh Persian: چونگونش
- Village
- Location within Iran
- Coordinates: 38°55′12″N 47°58′39″E
- Country: Iran
- Province: Ardabil
- County: Germi
- District: Central
- Rural District: Ojarud-e Gharbi

Population (2016)
  - Total: 80
- Time zone: UTC+3:30 (IRST)

Chungenesh (Persian: چونگونش) (Note: Also romanized as Chūngenesh; also known as Chaqūnganesh, Chongounash, Choqūngonash, Chūngūnesh, and Showngūnesh) is a village in Ojarud-e Gharbi Rural District of the Central District in Germi County, (Note: Formerly Moghan County) Ardabil province, Iran.

== Demographics ==
=== Population ===
At the time of the 2006 National Census, the village's population was 148 in 25 households. The following census in 2011 counted 115 people in 31 households. The 2016 census measured the population of the village as 80 people in 23 households.
