= Shur Bolagh, Ardabil =

Village in Ardabil province, Iran

Shur Bolagh Persian: شوربلاغ
- Village
- Location within Iran
- Coordinates: 39°02′12″N 47°59′49″E
- Country: Iran
- Province: Ardabil
- County: Germi
- District: Central
- Rural District: Ojarud-e Gharbi

Population (2016)
  - Total: 120
- Time zone: UTC+3:30 (IRST)

Shur Bolagh (Persian: شوربلاغ) (Note: Also romanized as Shūr Bolāgh) is a village in Ojarud-e Gharbi Rural District of the Central District in Germi County, (Note: Formerly Moghan County) Ardabil province, Iran.

== Demographics ==
=== Population ===
At the time of the 2006 National Census, the village's population was 162 in 38 households. The following census in 2011 counted 145 people in 44 households. The 2016 census measured the population of the village as 120 people in 44 households.
