= Al Qanab =

Village in Ardabil province, Iran

Al Qanab Persian: القناب
- Village
- Location within Iran
- Coordinates: 39°03′12″N 48°08′57″E
- Country: Iran
- Province: Ardabil
- County: Germi
- District: Central
- Rural District: Ojarud-e Markazi

Population (2016)
  - Total: 59
- Time zone: UTC+3:30 (IRST)

Al Qanab (Persian: القناب) (Note: Also romanized as Al Qanāb) is a village in Ojarud-e Markazi Rural District of the Central District in Germi County, (Note: Formerly Moghan County) Ardabil province, Iran.

== Demographics ==
=== Population ===
In the 2006 National Census, the village's population was 121 in 27 households. The following census in 2011 counted 92 people in 24 households. The 2016 census counted the population of the village as 59 people in 16 households.
