= Tazeh Kand-e Langan =

Village in Ardabil province, Iran

Tazeh Kand-e Langan Persian: تازه كندلنگان
- Village
- Location within Iran
- Coordinates: 38°57′41″N 47°58′04″E
- Country: Iran
- Province: Ardabil
- County: Germi
- District: Central
- Rural District: Ojarud-e Gharbi

Population (2016)
  - Total: 11
- Time zone: UTC+3:30 (IRST)

Tazeh Kand-e Langan (Persian: تازه كندلنگان) (Note: Also romanized as Tāzeh Kand-e Langān; also known as Tāzeh Kand) is a village in Ojarud-e Gharbi Rural District of the Central District in Germi County, (Note: Formerly Moghan County) Ardabil province, Iran.

== Demographics ==
=== Population ===
At the time of the 2006 National Census, the village's population was 30 in seven households. The following census in 2011 counted 19 people in six households. The 2016 census measured the population of the village as 11 people in six households.
