= Gilarlu =

Village in Ardabil province, Iran

Gilarlu Persian: گيلارلو
- Village
- Location within Iran
- Country: Iran
- Province: Ardabil
- County: Germi
- District: Central
- Rural District: Ojarud-e Gharbi

Population (2016)
  - Total: 329
- Time zone: UTC+3:30 (IRST)

Gilarlu (Persian: گيلارلو) (Note: Also romanized as Gīlārlū) is a village in Ojarud-e Gharbi Rural District of the Central District in Germi County, (Note: Formerly Moghan County) Ardabil province, Iran.

== Demographics ==
=== Population ===
At the time of the 2006 National Census, the village's population was 341 in 65 households. The following census in 2011 counted 349 people in 102 households. The 2016 census measured the population of the village as 329 people in 109 households.
