= Rahimlu =

Village in Ardabil province, Iran

Rahimlu Persian: رحيملو
- Village
- Location within Iran
- Coordinates: 39°02′07″N 48°03′04″E
- Country: Iran
- Province: Ardabil
- County: Germi
- District: Central
- Rural District: Ojarud-e Gharbi

Population (2016)
  - Total: 71
- Time zone: UTC+3:30 (IRST)

Rahimlu (Persian: رحيملو) (Note: Also romanized as Raḩīmlū) is a village in Ojarud-e Gharbi Rural District of the Central District in Germi County, (Note: Formerly Moghan County) Ardabil province, Iran.

== Demographics ==
=== Population ===
At the time of the 2006 National Census, the village's population was 108 in 21 households. The following census in 2011 counted 95 people in 23 households. The 2016 census measured the population of the village as 71 people in 21 households.
