= Khan Bolaghi =

Village in Ardabil province, Iran

Khan Bolaghi Persian: خانبلاغي
- Village
- Location within Iran
- Coordinates: 39°05′09″N 48°12′51″E
- Country: Iran
- Province: Ardabil
- County: Germi
- District: Central
- Rural District: Ojarud-e Markazi

Population (2016)
  - Total: 116
- Time zone: UTC+3:30 (IRST)

Khan Bolaghi (Persian: خانبلاغي) (Note: Also romanized as Khān Bolāghī) is a village in Ojarud-e Markazi Rural District of the Central District in Germi County, (Note: Formerly Moghan County) Ardabil province, Iran.

== Demographics ==
=== Population ===
In the 2006 National Census, the village's population was 186 in 39 households. The following census in 2011 counted 163 people in 38 households. The 2016 census counted the population of the village as 116 people in 35 households.
