= Bil Dashi =

Village in Ardabil province, Iran

Bil Dashi Persian: بيلداشي
- Village
- Location within Iran
- Coordinates: 38°58′11″N 48°00′13″E
- Country: Iran
- Province: Ardabil
- County: Germi
- District: Central
- Rural District: Ojarud-e Gharbi

Population (2016)
  - Total: 159
- Time zone: UTC+3:30 (IRST)

Bil Dashi (Persian: بيلداشي) (Note: Also romanized as Bīl Dāshī) is a village in Ojarud-e Gharbi Rural District of the Central District in Germi County, (Note: Formerly Moghan County) Ardabil province, Iran.

== Demographics ==
=== Population ===
At the time of the 2006 National Census, the village's population was 234 in 51 households. The following census in 2011 counted 155 people in 49 households. The 2016 census measured the population of the village as 159 people in 53 households.
