= Takanlu =

Village in Ardabil province, Iran

Takanlu Persian: تكانلو
- Village
- Location within Iran
- Coordinates: 39°05′33″N 47°56′58″E
- Country: Iran
- Province: Ardabil
- County: Germi
- District: Central
- Rural District: Ojarud-e Gharbi

Population (2016)
  - Total: 567
- Time zone: UTC+3:30 (IRST)

Takanlu (Persian: تكانلو) (Note: Also romanized as Takānlū) is a village in Ojarud-e Gharbi Rural District of the Central District in Germi County, (Note: Formerly Moghan County) Ardabil province, Iran.

== Demographics ==
=== Population ===
At the time of the 2006 National Census, the village's population was 688 in 131 households. The following census in 2011 counted 597 people in 143 households. The 2016 census measured the population of the village as 567 people in 152 households.
