= Ojaq Alazar =

Village in Ardabil province, Iran

Ojaq Alazar Persian: اوجاق الازار
- Village
- Location within Iran
- Coordinates: 39°04′12″N 48°10′08″E
- Country: Iran
- Province: Ardabil
- County: Germi
- District: Central
- Rural District: Ojarud-e Markazi

Population (2016)
  - Total: 77
- Time zone: UTC+3:30 (IRST)

Ojaq Alazar (Persian: اوجاق الازار) (Note: Also romanized as Ojāq Ālāzār; also known as Alazar, Ālz̄ar, and Ojāq) is a village in Ojarud-e Markazi Rural District of the Central District in Germi County, (Note: Formerly Moghan County) Ardabil province, Iran.

== Demographics ==
=== Population ===
In the 2006 National Census, the village's population was 194 in 43 households. The following census in 2011 counted 104 people in 35 households. The 2016 census counted the population of the village as 77 people in 26 households.
