= Azhdarlu =

Village in Ardabil province, Iran

Azhdarlu Persian: اژدرلو
- Village
- Location within Iran
- Coordinates: 39°07′29″N 48°11′48″E
- Country: Iran
- Province: Ardabil
- County: Germi
- District: Central
- Rural District: Ojarud-e Markazi

Population (2016)
  - Total: 70
- Time zone: UTC+3:30 (IRST)

Azhdarlu (Persian: اژدرلو) (Note: Also romanized as Azhdarlū) is a village in Ojarud-e Markazi Rural District of the Central District in Germi County, (Note: Formerly Moghan County) Ardabil province, Iran.

== Demographics ==
=== Population ===
In the 2006 National Census, the village's population was 86 in 21 households. The following census in 2011 counted 71 people in 20 households. The 2016 census counted the population of the village as 70 people in 24 households.
