= Ghaffar Kandi =

Village in Ardabil province, Iran

Ghaffar Kandi Persian: غفاركندي
- Village
- Location within Iran
- Coordinates: 38°57′20″N 47°57′48″E
- Country: Iran
- Province: Ardabil
- County: Germi
- District: Central
- Rural District: Ojarud-e Gharbi

Population (2016)
  - Total: 49
- Time zone: UTC+3:30 (IRST)

Ghaffar Kandi (Persian: غفاركندي) (Note: Also romanized as Ghaffār Kandī) is a village in Ojarud-e Gharbi Rural District of the Central District in Germi County, (Note: Formerly Moghan County) Ardabil province, Iran.

== Demographics ==
=== Population ===
At the time of the 2006 National Census, the village's population was 104 in 19 households. The following census in 2011 counted 51 people in 17 households. The 2016 census measured the population of the village as 49 people in 20 households.
