= Jin Kandi =

Village in Ardabil province, Iran

Jin Kandi Persian: جين كندي
- Village
- Location within Iran
- Coordinates: 38°59′28″N 47°58′32″E
- Country: Iran
- Province: Ardabil
- County: Germi
- District: Central
- Rural District: Ojarud-e Gharbi

Population (2016)
  - Total: 62
- Time zone: UTC+3:30 (IRST)

Jin Kandi (Persian: جين كندي) (Note: Also romanized as Jīn Kandī; also known as Jen Kandī) is a village in Ojarud-e Gharbi Rural District of the Central District in Germi County, (Note: Formerly Moghan County) Ardabil province, Iran.

== Demographics ==
=== Population ===
At the time of the 2006 National Census, the village's population was 84 in 17 households. The following census in 2011 counted 70 people in 18 households. The 2016 census measured the population of the village as 62 people in 17 households.
