= Qeshlaq, Ardabil =

Village in Ardabil province, Iran

Qeshlaq Persian: قشلاق
- Village
- Location within Iran
- Coordinates: 38°59′14″N 48°03′52″E
- Country: Iran
- Province: Ardabil
- County: Germi
- District: Central
- Rural District: Ojarud-e Gharbi

Population (2016)
  - Total: 6
- Time zone: UTC+3:30 (IRST)

Qeshlaq (Persian: قشلاق) (Note: Also romanized as Qeshlāq) is a village in Ojarud-e Gharbi Rural District of the Central District in Germi County, (Note: Formerly Moghan County) Ardabil province, Iran.

== Demographics ==
=== Population ===
At the time of the 2006 National Census, the village's population was 20 in six households. The following census in 2011 counted a population below the reporting threshold. The 2016 census measured the population of the village as six people in four households.
