= Armar Mashhadlu =

Village in Ardabil province, Iran

Armar Mashhadlu Persian: ارمارمشهدلو
- Village
- Country: Iran
- Province: Ardabil
- County: Germi
- District: Central
- Rural District: Ojarud-e Gharbi

Population (2016)
  - Total: 30
- Time zone: UTC+3:30 (IRST)

Armar Mashhadlu (Persian: ارمارمشهدلو) (Note: Also romanized as Armarmshahadlu and Armārmshahadlū) is a village in Ojarud-e Gharbi Rural District of the Central District in Germi County, (Note: Formerly Moghan County) Ardabil province, Iran.

== Demographics ==
=== Population ===
At the time of the 2006 National Census, the village's population was 63 in 17 households. The following census in 2011 counted 45 people in 12 households. The 2016 census measured the population of the village as 30 people in nine households.
