= Dash Bolagh, Germi =

Village in Ardabil province, Iran

Dash Bolagh Persian: داش بلاغ
- Village
- Location within Iran
- Coordinates: 39°01′30″N 48°00′57″E
- Country: Iran
- Province: Ardabil
- County: Germi
- District: Central
- Rural District: Ojarud-e Gharbi

Population (2016)
  - Total: 35
- Time zone: UTC+3:30 (IRST)

Dash Bolagh (Persian: داش بلاغ) (Note: Also romanized as Dāsh Bolāgh) is a village in Ojarud-e Gharbi Rural District of the Central District in Germi County, (Note: Formerly Moghan County) Ardabil province, Iran.

== Demographics ==
=== Population ===
At the time of the 2006 National Census, the village's population was 49 in 12 households. The following census in 2011 counted 46 people in 10 households. The 2016 census measured the population of the village as 35 people in nine households.
