= Qahramanlu =

Village in Ardabil province, Iran

Qahramanlu Persian: قهرامانلو
- Village
- Location within Iran
- Coordinates: 39°07′02″N 48°11′20″E
- Country: Iran
- Province: Ardabil
- County: Germi
- District: Central
- Rural District: Ojarud-e Markazi

Population (2016)
  - Total: 132
- Time zone: UTC+3:30 (IRST)

Qahramanlu (Persian: قهرامانلو) (Note: Also romanized as Qahramānlū) is a village in Ojarud-e Markazi Rural District of the Central District in Germi County, (Note: Formerly Moghan County) Ardabil province, Iran.

== Demographics ==
=== Population ===
In the 2006 National Census, the village's population was 191 in 33 households. The following census in 2011 counted 155 people in 36 households. The 2016 census counted the population of the village as 132 people in 33 households.
