= Tulir =

Village in Ardabil province, Iran

Tulir Persian: تولير
- Village
- Location within Iran
- Coordinates: 38°59′19″N 48°02′38″E
- Country: Iran
- Province: Ardabil
- County: Germi
- District: Central
- Rural District: Ojarud-e Gharbi

Population (2016)
  - Total: 66
- Time zone: UTC+3:30 (IRST)

Tulir (Persian: تولير) (Note: Also romanized as Towlīr and Tūlīr) is a village in Ojarud-e Gharbi Rural District of the Central District in Germi County, (Note: Formerly Moghan County) Ardabil province, Iran.

== Demographics ==
=== Population ===
At the time of the 2006 National Census, the village's population was 119 in 24 households. The following census in 2011 counted 84 people in 24 households. The 2016 census measured the population of the village as 66 people in 22 households.
