= Beneh, Ardabil =

Village in Ardabil province, Iran

Beneh Persian: بنه
- Village
- Location within Iran
- Coordinates: 39°04′45″N 47°59′23″E
- Country: Iran
- Province: Ardabil
- County: Germi
- District: Central
- Rural District: Ojarud-e Gharbi

Population (2016)
  - Total: 688
- Time zone: UTC+3:30 (IRST)

Beneh (Persian: بنه) is a village in Ojarud-e Gharbi Rural District of the Central District in Germi County, (Note: Formerly Moghan County) Ardabil province, Iran.

== Demographics ==
=== Population ===
At the time of the 2006 National Census, the village's population was 802 in 177 households. The following census in 2011 counted 875 people in 218 households. The 2016 census measured the population of the village as 688 people in 218 households.
