= Amrahlu =

Village in Ardabil province, Iran

Amrahlu Persian: امراهلو
- Village
- Location within Iran
- Coordinates: 39°06′26″N 48°11′01″E
- Country: Iran
- Province: Ardabil
- County: Germi
- District: Central
- Rural District: Ojarud-e Markazi

Population (2016)
  - Total: 110
- Time zone: UTC+3:30 (IRST)

Amrahlu (Persian: امراهلو) (Note: Also romanized as Amrāhlū; also known as Kakīl) is a village in Ojarud-e Markazi Rural District of the Central District in Germi County, (Note: Formerly Moghan County) Ardabil province, Iran.

== Demographics ==
=== Population ===
In the 2006 National Census, the village's population was 242 in 53 households. The following census in 2011 counted 171 people in 47 households. The 2016 census counted the population of the village as 110 people in 35 households.
