= Shahrak-e Vali Asr, Ardabil =

Village in Ardabil province, Iran

Shahrak-e Vali Asr Persian: شهرك وليعصر
- Village
- Location within Iran
- Coordinates: 39°04′00″N 48°02′19″E
- Country: Iran
- Province: Ardabil
- County: Germi
- District: Central
- Rural District: Ojarud-e Gharbi

Population (2016)
  - Total: 1,591
- Time zone: UTC+3:30 (IRST)

Shahrak-e Vali Asr (Persian: شهرك وليعصر) (Note: Also romanized as Shahrak-e Valī ʿAṣr) is a village in Ojarud-e Gharbi Rural District of the Central District in Germi County, (Note: Formerly Moghan County) Ardabil province, Iran.

== Demographics ==
=== Population ===
At the time of the 2006 National Census, the village's population was 1,342 in 288 households. The following census in 2011 counted 1,973 people in 434 households. The 2016 census measured the population of the village as 1,591 people in 456 households. It was the most populous village in its rural district.
