= Hamzah Khanlu =

Village in Ardabil province, Iran

Hamzah Khanlu Persian: حمزه خانلو
- Village
- Location within Iran
- Coordinates: 39°05′18″N 48°10′38″E
- Country: Iran
- Province: Ardabil
- County: Germi
- District: Central
- Rural District: Ojarud-e Markazi

Population (2016)
  - Total: 68
- Time zone: UTC+3:30 (IRST)

Hamzah Khanlu (Persian: حمزه خانلو) (Note: Also romanized as Ḩamzah Khānlū) is a village in, and the capital of, Ojarud-e Markazi Rural District in the Central District of Germi County, (Note: Formerly Moghan County) Ardabil province, Iran.

== Demographics ==
=== Population ===
At the time of the 2006 National Census, the village's population was 161 in 32 households. The following census in 2011 counted 108 people in 29 households. The 2016 census measured the population of the village as 68 people in 18 households.
