= Moghvan =

Village in Ardabil province, Iran

Moghvan Persian: مغوان
- Village
- Location within Iran
- Coordinates: 39°00′21″N 48°02′43″E
- Country: Iran
- Province: Ardabil
- County: Germi
- District: Central
- Rural District: Ojarud-e Gharbi

Population (2016)
  - Total: 508
- Time zone: UTC+3:30 (IRST)

Moghvan (Persian: مغوان) (Note: Also romanized as Maghvan, Maghvān, Moghvan, and Moghvān) is a village in Ojarud-e Gharbi Rural District of the Central District in Germi County, (Note: Formerly Moghan County) Ardabil province, Iran.

== Demographics ==
=== Population ===
At the time of the 2006 National Census, the village's population was 518 in 113 households. The following census in 2011 counted 529 people in 144 households. The 2016 census measured the population of the village as 508 people in 153 households.
