= Daryaman =

Village in Ardabil province, Iran

Daryaman Persian: دريامان
- Village
- Location within Iran
- Coordinates: 39°00′32″N 48°01′04″E
- Country: Iran
- Province: Ardabil
- County: Germi
- District: Central
- Rural District: Ojarud-e Gharbi

Population (2016)
  - Total: 94
- Time zone: UTC+3:30 (IRST)

Daryaman (Persian: دريامان) (Note: Also romanized as Daryāmān) is a village in Ojarud-e Gharbi Rural District of the Central District in Germi County, (Note: Formerly Moghan County) Ardabil province, Iran.

== Demographics ==
=== Population ===
At the time of the 2006 National Census, the village's population was 172 in 37 households. The following census in 2011 counted 112 people in 30 households. The 2016 census measured the population of the village as 94 people in 31 households.
