= Zengir =

Village in Ardabil province, Iran

Zengir Persian: زنگير
- Village
- Location within Iran
- Coordinates: 39°03′02″N 48°10′02″E
- Country: Iran
- Province: Ardabil
- County: Germi
- District: Central
- Rural District: Ojarud-e Markazi

Population (2016)
  - Total: 296
- Time zone: UTC+3:30 (IRST)

Zengir (Persian: زنگير) (Note: Also romanized as Zengīr) is a village in Ojarud-e Markazi Rural District of the Central District in Germi County, (Note: Formerly Moghan County) Ardabil province, Iran.

== Demographics ==
=== Population ===
In the 2006 National Census, the village's population was 494 in 110 households. The following census in 2011 counted 398 people in 110 households. The 2016 census counted the population of the village as 296 people in 94 households. It was the most populous village in its rural district.
