= Angurd =

Village in Ardabil province, Iran

Angurd Persian: انگورد
- Village
- Location within Iran
- Coordinates: 38°59′36″N 48°00′03″E
- Country: Iran
- Province: Ardabil
- County: Germi
- District: Central
- Rural District: Ojarud-e Gharbi

Population (2016)
  - Total: 44
- Time zone: UTC+3:30 (IRST)

Angurd (Persian: انگورد) (Note: Also romanized as Āngūrd and Angūrd) is a village in Ojarud-e Gharbi Rural District of the Central District in Germi County, (Note: Formerly Moghan County) Ardabil province, Iran.

== Demographics ==
=== Population ===
At the time of the 2006 National Census, the village's population was 43 in six households. The following census in 2011 counted 33 people in seven households. The 2016 census measured the population of the village as 44 people in 13 households.
