= Own Bir Beyglu =

Village in Ardabil province, Iran

Own Bir Beyglu Persian: اون بيربيگ لو
- Village
- Location within Iran
- Coordinates: 39°04′53″N 47°59′59″E
- Country: Iran
- Province: Ardabil
- County: Germi
- District: Central
- Rural District: Ojarud-e Gharbi

Population (2016)
  - Total: 346
- Time zone: UTC+3:30 (IRST)

Own Bir Beyglu (Persian: اون بيربيگ لو) (Note: Also romanized as Own Bīr Beyglū and Ūnbīr Beyglū) is a village in Ojarud-e Gharbi Rural District of the Central District in Germi County, (Note: Formerly Moghan County) Ardabil province, Iran.

== Demographics ==
=== Population ===
At the time of the 2006 National Census, the village's population was 418 in 87 households. The following census in 2011 counted 397 people in 100 households. The 2016 census measured the population of the village as 346 people in 100 households.
