= Hasan Kandi, Ardabil =

Village in Ardabil province, Iran

Hasan Kandi Persian: حسن كندي
- Village
- Location within Iran
- Coordinates: 39°05′33″N 48°10′46″E
- Country: Iran
- Province: Ardabil
- County: Germi
- District: Central
- Rural District: Ojarud-e Markazi

Population (2016)
  - Total: 142
- Time zone: UTC+3:30 (IRST)

Hasan Kandi (Persian: حسن كندي) (Note: Also romanized as Ḩasan Kandī) is a village in Ojarud-e Markazi Rural District of the Central District in Germi County, (Note: Formerly Moghan County) Ardabil province, Iran.

== Demographics ==
=== Population ===
In the 2006 National Census, the village's population was 254 in 54 households. The following census in 2011 counted 201 people in 55 households. The 2016 census counted the population of the village as 142 people in 44 households.
