= Tak Dam, Germi =

Village in Ardabil province, Iran

Tak Dam Persian: تكدام
- Village
- Location within Iran
- Coordinates: 38°58′20″N 47°57′52″E
- Country: Iran
- Province: Ardabil
- County: Germi
- District: Central
- Rural District: Ojarud-e Gharbi

Population (2016)
  - Total: 12
- Time zone: UTC+3:30 (IRST)

Tak Dam (Persian: تكدام) (Note: Also romanized as Tak Dām) is a village in Ojarud-e Gharbi Rural District of the Central District in Germi County, (Note: Formerly Moghan County) Ardabil province, Iran.

== Demographics ==
=== Population ===
At the time of the 2006 National Census, the village's population was 29 in seven households. The following census in 2011 counted 18 people in six households. The 2016 census measured the population of the village as 12 people in four households.
