= Loskeh Daraq =

Village in Ardabil province, Iran

Loskeh Daraq Persian: لسكه درق
- Village
- Location within Iran
- Coordinates: 38°55′21″N 48°02′38″E
- Country: Iran
- Province: Ardabil
- County: Germi
- District: Central
- Rural District: Ojarud-e Gharbi

Population (2016)
  - Total: 31
- Time zone: UTC+3:30 (IRST)

Loskeh Daraq (Persian: لسكه درق) (Note: Also known as Luskeh Daraq) is a village in Ojarud-e Gharbi Rural District of the Central District in Germi County, (Note: Formerly Moghan County) Ardabil province, Iran.

== Demographics ==
=== Population ===
At the time of the 2006 National Census, the village's population was 55 in 14 households. The following census in 2011 counted 40 people in 11 households. The 2016 census measured the population of the village as 31 people in 10 households.
