= Ilkhchi-ye Olya =

Village in Ardabil province, Iran

Ilkhchi-ye Olya Persian: ایلخچی علیا
- Village
- Location within Iran
- Coordinates: 39°03′03″N 48°07′51″E
- Country: Iran
- Province: Ardabil
- County: Germi
- District: Central
- Rural District: Ojarud-e Markazi

Population (2016)
  - Total: 36
- Time zone: UTC+3:30 (IRST)

Ilkhchi-ye Olya (Persian: ایلخچی علیا) (Note: Also romanized as Īlkhchī-ye ’Olyā; also known as Īlchi-ye ‘Olyā and Īlkhchīh-ye Bālā) is a village in Ojarud-e Markazi Rural District of the Central District in Germi County, (Note: Formerly Moghan County) Ardabil province, Iran.

== Demographics ==
=== Population ===
In the 2006 National Census, the village's population was 80 in 17 households. The following census in 2011 counted 45 people in 12 households. The 2016 census counted the population of the village as 36 people in 12 households.
