= Chunzeh-ye Sofla =

Village in Ardabil province, Iran

Chunzeh-ye Sofla Persian: چونزه سفلي
- Village
- Location within Iran
- Coordinates: 39°02′56″N 48°02′32″E
- Country: Iran
- Province: Ardabil
- County: Germi
- District: Central
- Rural District: Ojarud-e Gharbi

Population (2016)
  - Total: 32
- Time zone: UTC+3:30 (IRST)

Chunzeh-ye Sofla (Persian: چونزه سفلي) (Note: Also romanized as Chūnzeh-ye Soflá; also known as Chūnzeh-ye Pā’īn) is a village in Ojarud-e Gharbi Rural District of the Central District in Germi County, (Note: Formerly Moghan County) Ardabil province, Iran.

== Demographics ==
=== Population ===
At the time of the 2006 National Census, the village's population was 46 in 10 households. The following census in 2011 counted 35 people in nine households. The 2016 census measured the population of the village as 32 people in 10 households.
