= Bashirlui-ye Sofla =

Village in Ardabil province, Iran

Bashirlui-ye Sofla Persian: بشيرلوي سفلي
- Village
- Location within Iran
- Coordinates: 39°04′14″N 48°00′44″E
- Country: Iran
- Province: Ardabil
- County: Germi
- District: Central
- Rural District: Ojarud-e Gharbi

Population (2016)
  - Total: 37
- Time zone: UTC+3:30 (IRST)

Bashirlui-ye Sofla (Persian: بشيرلوي سفلي) (Note: Also romanized as Bashīrlūī-ye Soflá; also known as Bashīrlū-ye Pā’īn and Bashīrlū-ye Soflá) is a village in Ojarud-e Gharbi Rural District of the Central District in Germi County, (Note: Formerly Moghan County) Ardabil province, Iran.

== Demographics ==
=== Population ===
At the time of the 2006 National Census, the village's population was 38 in eight households. The following census in 2011 counted 43 people in 11 households. The 2016 census measured the population of the village as 37 people in 10 households.
