= Ilkhchi-ye Sofla =

Village in Ardabil province, Iran

Ilkhchi-ye Sofla Persian: ایلخچی سفلی
- Village
- Location within Iran
- Coordinates: 39°02′54″N 48°07′16″E
- Country: Iran
- Province: Ardabil
- County: Germi
- District: Central
- Rural District: Ojarud-e Markazi

Population (2016)
  - Total: 193
- Time zone: UTC+3:30 (IRST)

Ilkhchi-ye Sofla (Persian: ایلخچی سفلی) (Note: Also romanized as Īlkhchī-ye Soflá; also known as Īlchi-ye Soflá and Īlkhchīh-ye Pā’īn) is a village in Ojarud-e Markazi Rural District of the Central District in Germi County, (Note: Formerly Moghan County) Ardabil province, Iran.

== Demographics ==
=== Population ===
In the 2006 National Census, the village's population was 271 in 52 households. The following census in 2011 counted 252 people in 68 households. The 2016 census counted the population of the village as 193 people in 65 households.
