= Bashirlui-ye Olya =

Village in Ardabil province, Iran

Bashirlui-ye Olya Persian: بشيرلوي عليا
- Village
- Location within Iran
- Coordinates: 39°03′57″N 48°01′12″E
- Country: Iran
- Province: Ardabil
- County: Germi
- District: Central
- Rural District: Ojarud-e Gharbi

Population (2016)
  - Total: 80
- Time zone: UTC+3:30 (IRST)

Bashirlui-ye Olya (Persian: بشيرلوي عليا) (Note: Also romanized as Bashīrluī-ye ‘Olyā; also known as Bashirlu, Bashīrlu, Bashīrlu-ye Bālā and Bashīrlu-ye ‘Olyā) is a village in Ojarud-e Gharbi Rural District of the Central District in Germi County, (Note: Formerly Moghan County) Ardabil province, Iran.

== Demographics ==
=== Population ===
At the time of the 2006 National Census, the village's population was 127 in 24 households. The following census in 2011 counted 101 people in 30 households. The 2016 census measured the population of the village as 80 people in 25 households.
