= Chunzeh-ye Olya =

Village in Ardabil province, Iran

Chunzeh-ye Olya Persian: چونزه عليا
- Village
- Location within Iran
- Coordinates: 39°02′08″N 48°01′39″E
- Country: Iran
- Province: Ardabil
- County: Germi
- District: Central
- Rural District: Ojarud-e Gharbi

Population (2016)
  - Total: 48
- Time zone: UTC+3:30 (IRST)

Chunzeh-ye Olya (Persian: چونزه عليا) (Note: Also romanized as Chūnzeh-ye 'Olyā; also known as Chūnzeh-ye Bālā) is a village in Ojarud-e Gharbi Rural District of the Central District in Germi County, (Note: Formerly Moghan County) Ardabil province, Iran.

== Demographics ==
=== Population ===
At the time of the 2006 National Census, the village's population was 144 in 26 households. The following census in 2011 counted 73 people in 16 households. The 2016 census measured the population of the village as 48 people in 16 households.
