= Khan Kandi, Germi =

Village in Ardabil province, Iran

Khan Kandi Persian: خان كندي
- Village
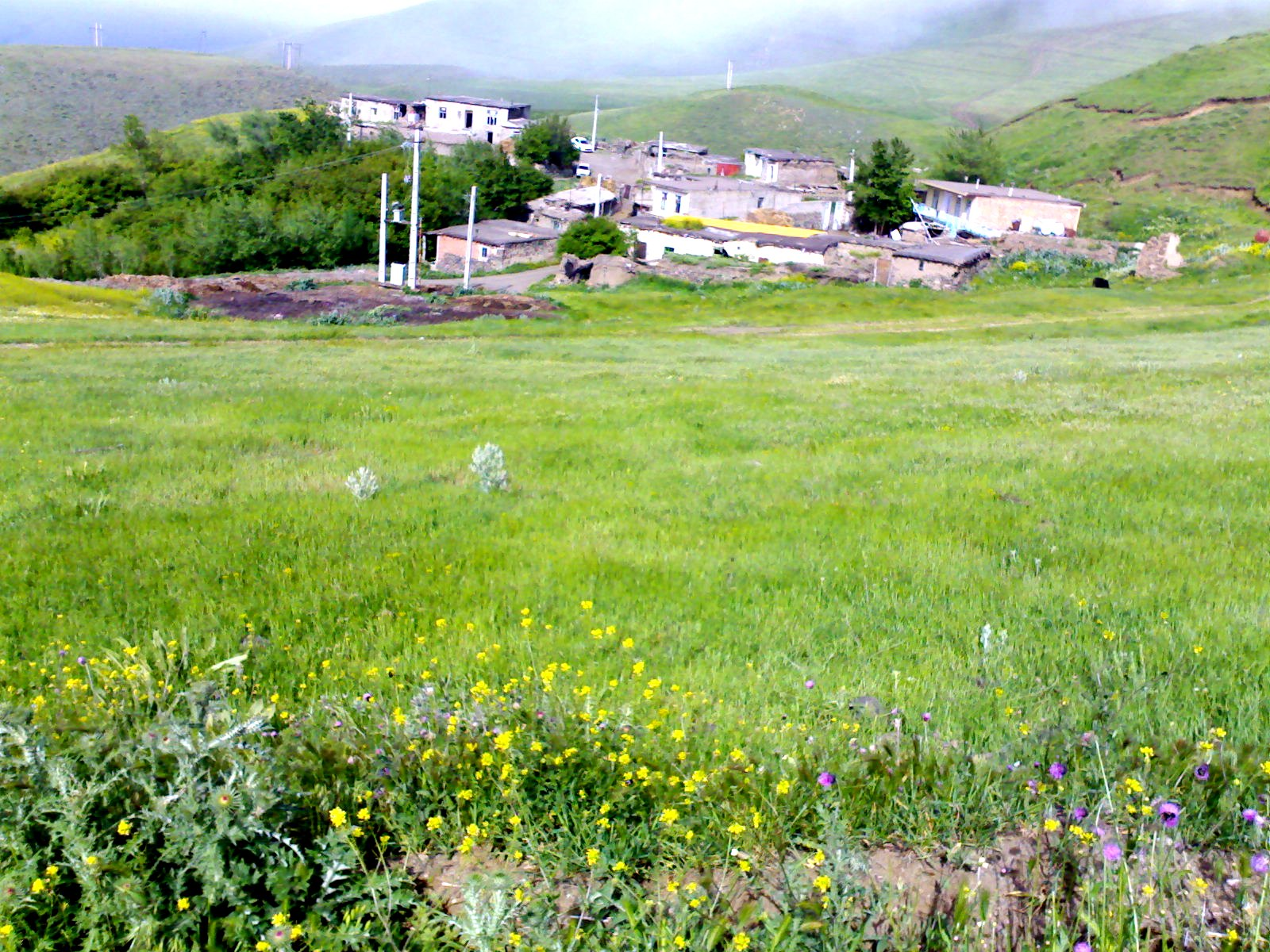
- The village of Khan Kandi

- Location within Iran
- Coordinates: 38°55′17″N 48°03′25″E
- Country: Iran
- Province: Ardabil
- County: Germi
- District: Central
- Rural District: Ojarud-e Gharbi

Population (2016)
  - Total: 16
- Time zone: UTC+3:30 (IRST)

Khan Kandi (Persian: خان كندي) (Note: Also romanized as Khān Kandī) is a village in Ojarud-e Gharbi Rural District of the Central District in Germi County, (Note: Formerly Moghan County) Ardabil province, Iran. It is close to the border of Azerbaijan.

== History ==
Khan Kandi was founded simultaneously with the village of Tulun and was an original cornerstone during the rule of Nadir Shah.

== Demographics ==
=== Population ===
At the time of the 2006 National Census, the village's population was 18 in seven households. The following census in 2011 counted 17 people in five households. The 2016 census measured the population of the village as 16 people in five households.

== Climate ==
Khan Kandi village has a cool mountain climate in the summer and is cold and extremely snowy in the winter. The average maximum temperature in July is up to 24 degrees Celsius, while its average temperature decreases to -7 degrees Celsius in January and February. The highest average rainfall occurs in October (68 mm) and the lowest average rainfall in July (3 mm). Its climatic and topographical position, and unique climate of the countryside have contributed to pleasant weather from mid-spring through the warm months of the year, especially in August and September.

During much of the year, most people from this village live in cities, such as Tehran, Ardabil, and Germi, to carry out their economic activities and earn a living.

== Economy and jobs ==
The main occupations of villagers are animal husbandry, beekeeping and agriculture.

== Wildlife ==
A variety of animals inhabit the mountains and meadows surrounding Khan Kandi.

== Gallery ==
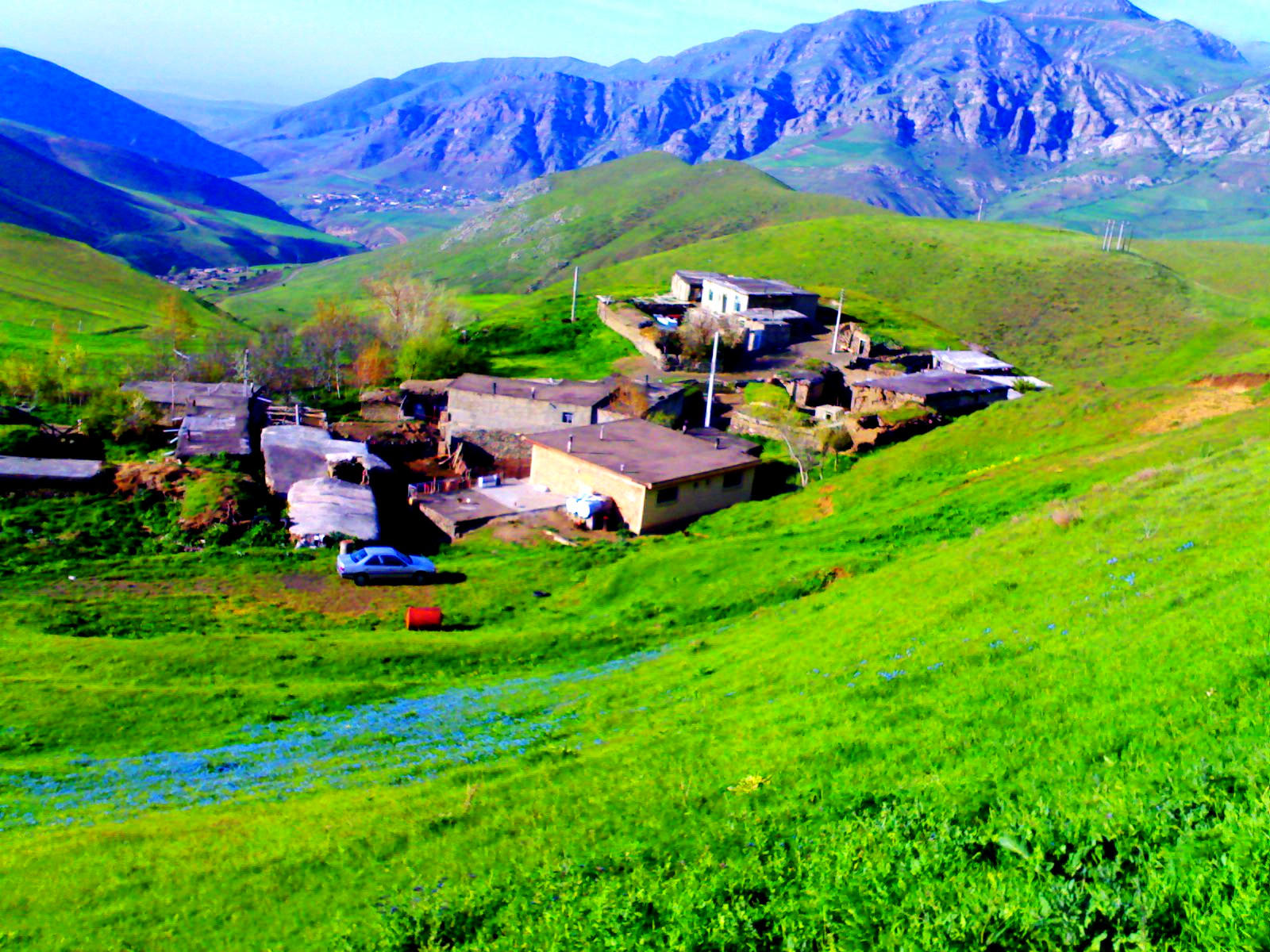
khankandi Village

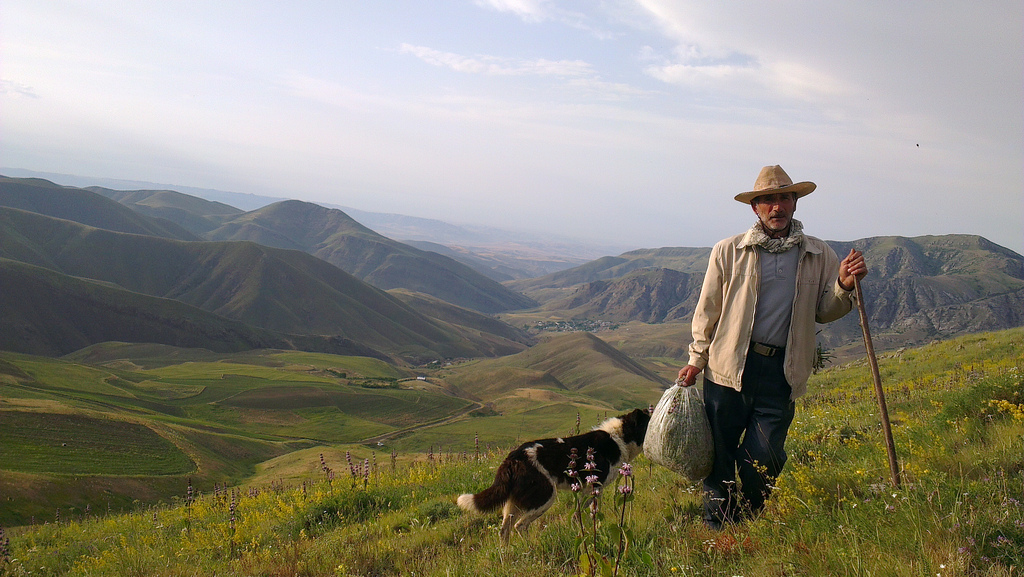
A Tourist in khankandi Village

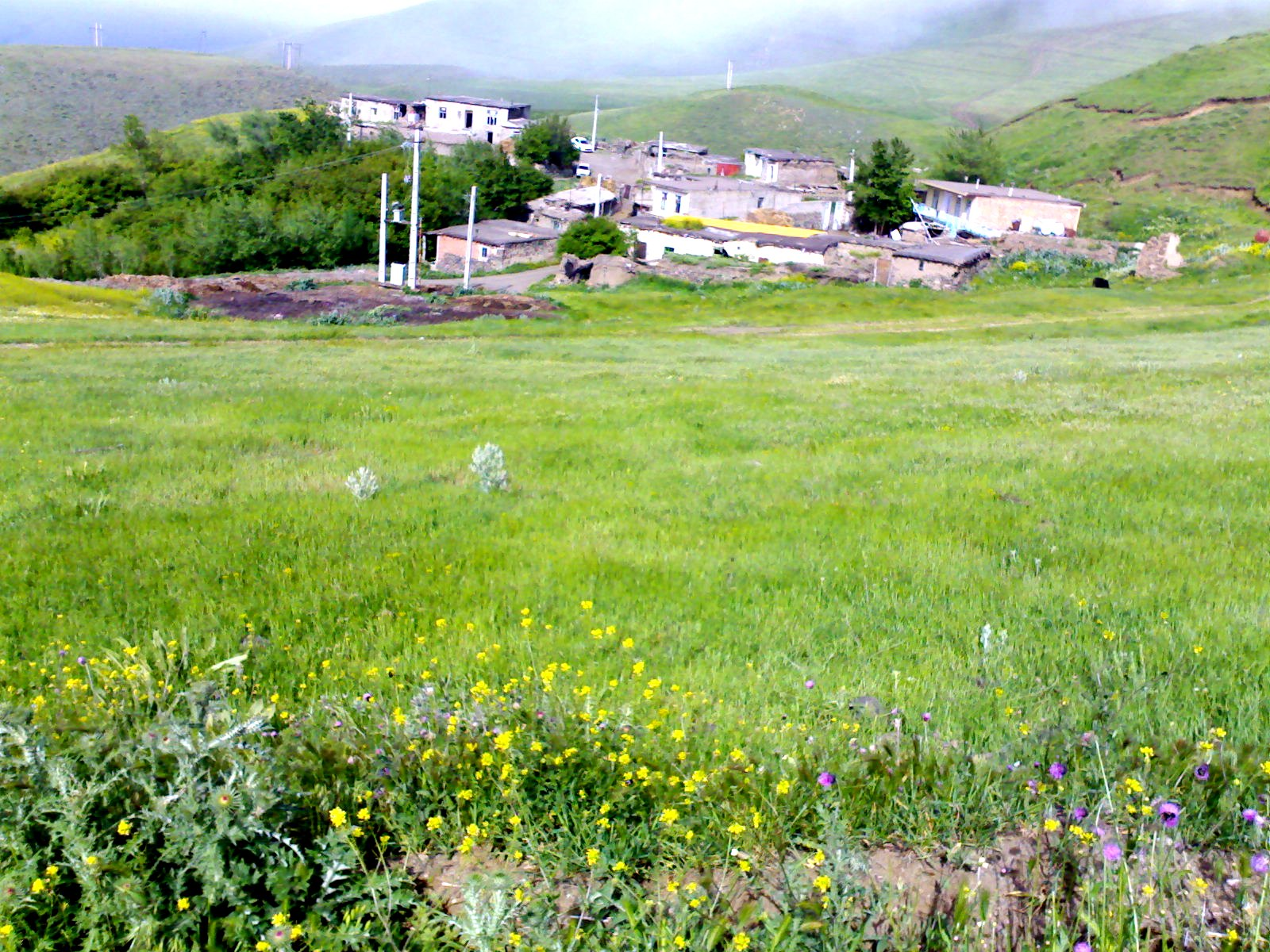
khankandi Village

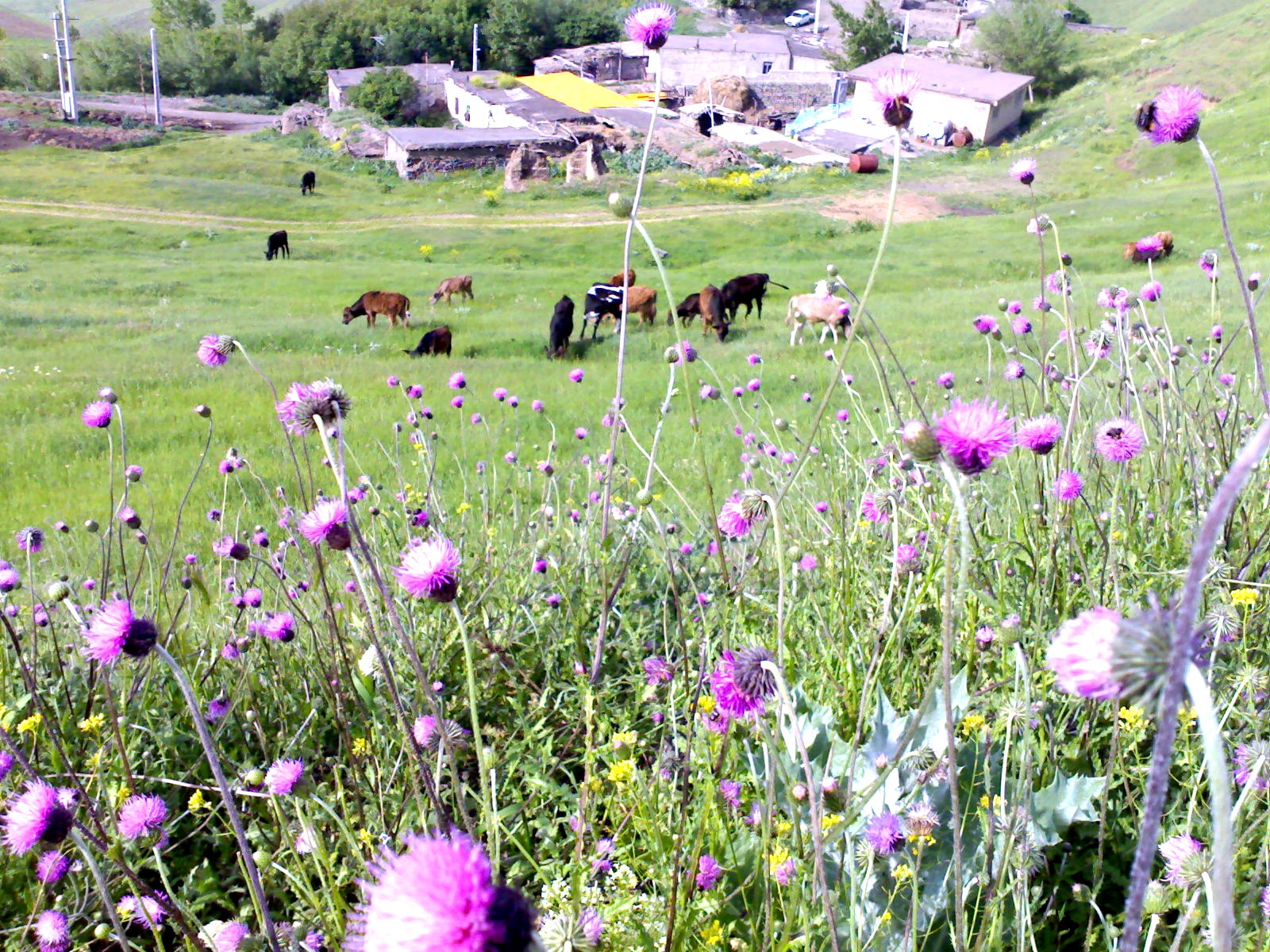
khankandi Village

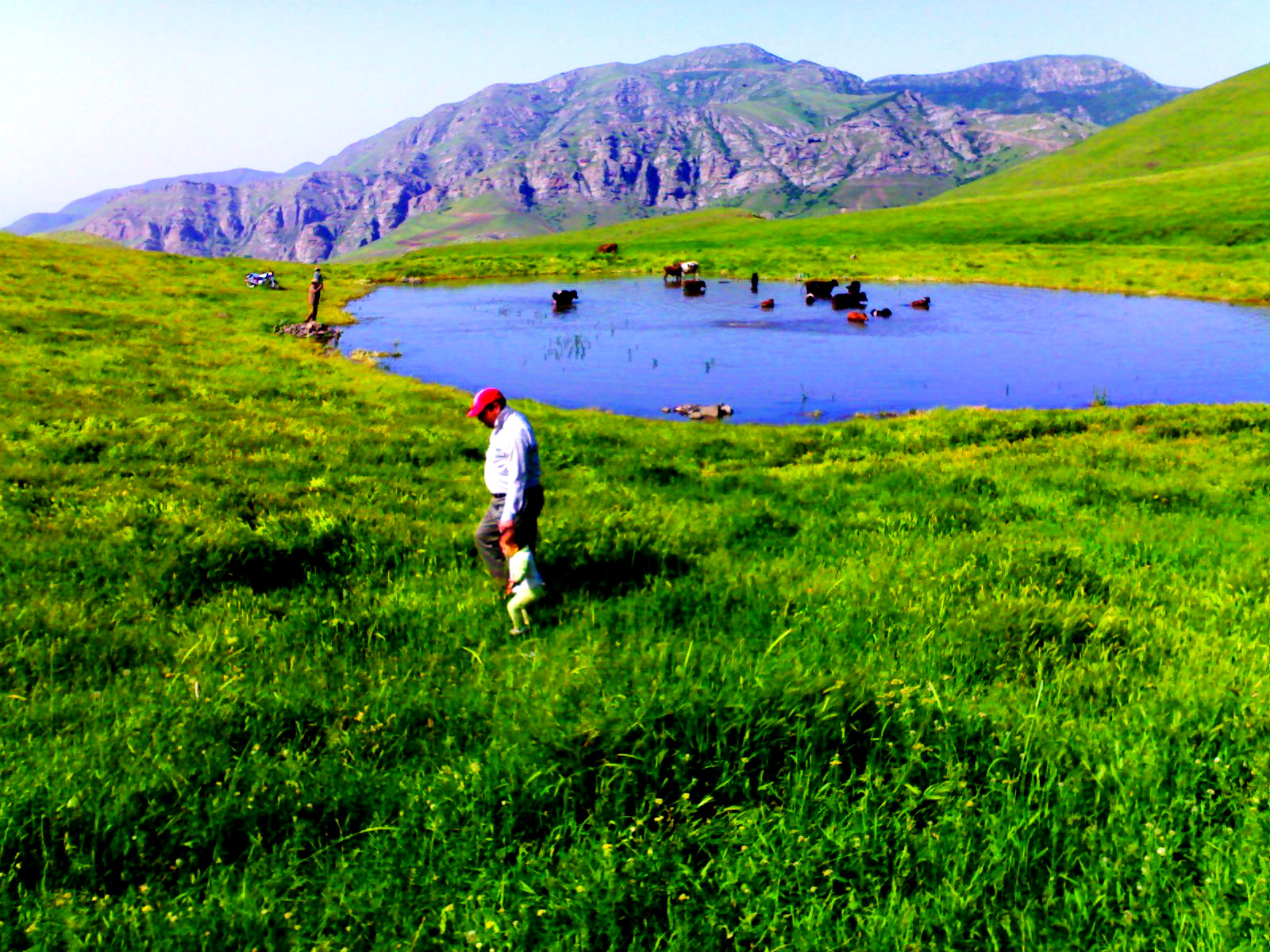
Ghalghanlu Lake in Khan kandi Village
