= Owli Kandi =

Village in Ardabil province, Iran

Owli Kandi Persian: اولي كندي
- Village
- Location within Iran
- Country: Iran
- Province: Ardabil
- County: Germi
- District: Central
- Rural District: Ojarud-e Gharbi

Population (2016)
  - Total: 124
- Time zone: UTC+3:30 (IRST)

Owli Kandi (Persian: اولي كندي) (Note: Also known as Oli Kandi and Olī Kandī) is a village in Ojarud-e Gharbi Rural District of the Central District in Germi County, (Note: Formerly Moghan County) Ardabil province, Iran.

== Demographics ==
=== Population ===
At the time of the 2006 National Census, the village's population was 154 in 30 households. The following census in 2011 counted 121 people in 38 households. The 2016 census measured the population of the village as 124 people in 45 households.
