= Ojarud-e Gharbi Rural District =

Rural district in Ardabil province, Iran

Ojarud-e Gharbi Rural District دهستان اجارود غربی
- Rural District
- Location within Iran
- Coordinates: 39°00′N 48°01′E
- Country: Iran
- Province: Ardabil
- County: Germi
- District: Central
- Established: 1987
- Capital: Dizaj

Population (2016)
  - Total: 6,523
- Time zone: UTC+3:30 (IRST)

Ojarud-e Gharbi Rural District (Persian: دهستان اجارود غربی) is in the Central District of Germi County, (Note: Formerly Moghan County) Ardabil province, Iran. Its capital is the village of Dizaj.

== Demographics ==
=== Population ===
At the time of the 2006 National Census, the rural district's population was 7,849 in 1,669 households. There were 7,775 inhabitants in 1,983 households at the following census of 2011. The 2016 census measured the population of the rural district as 6,523 in 1,999 households. The most populous of its 38 villages was Shahrak-e Vali Asr, with 1,591 people.

=== Other villages in the rural district ===
- Angurd
- Armar Mashhadlu
- Azizlu
- Bashirlui-ye Olya
- Bashirlui-ye Sofla
- Beneh
- Bil Dashi
- Chungenesh
- Chunzeh-ye Olya
- Chunzeh-ye Sofla
- Daryaman
- Dash Bolagh
- Ghaffar Kandi
- Gilarlu
- Jin Kandi
- Khan Kandi
- Laleh Bolaghi
- Loskeh Daraq
- Majidlu
- Moghvan
- Owli Kandi
- Own Bir Beyglu
- Qarah Quch
- Qeshlaq
- Rahimlu
- Shur Bolagh
- Tak Dam
- Takanlu
- Tazeh Kand-e Langan
- Tulir
- Tulun
