= Germi =

City in Ardabil province, Iran

Germi Persian: گرمی
- City
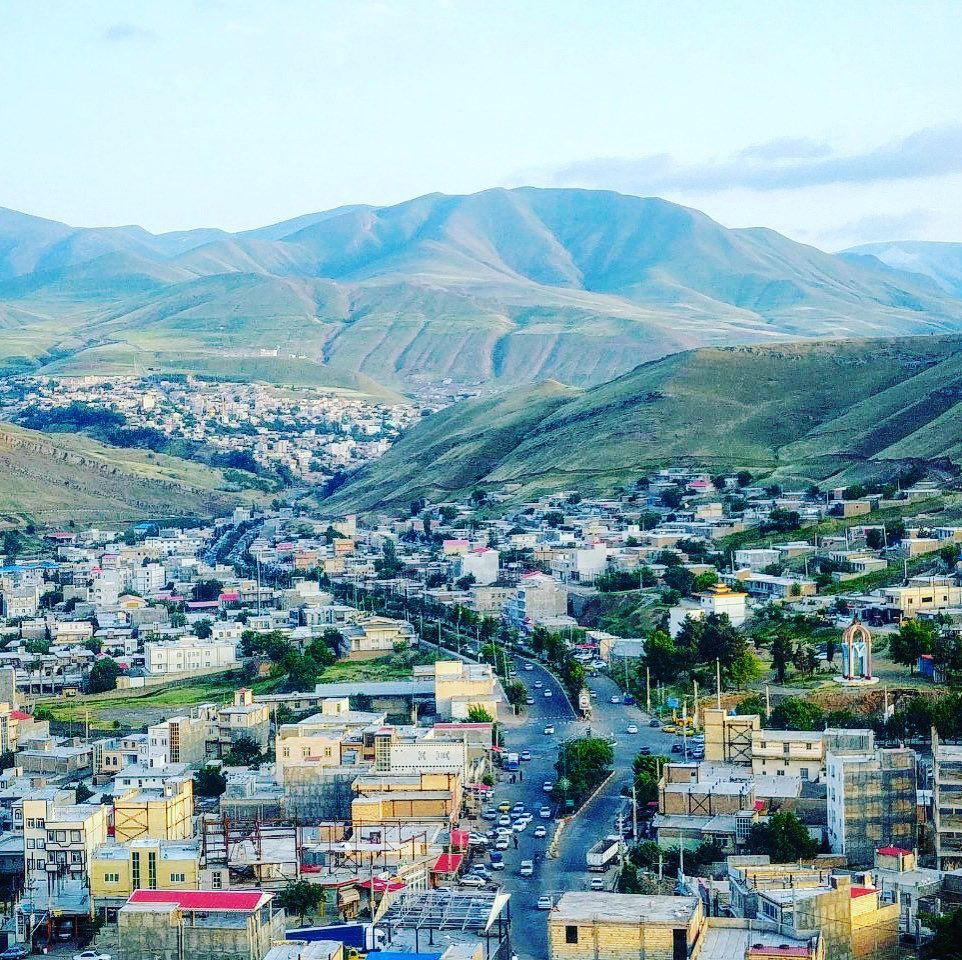
- Germi

- Location within Iran
- Coordinates: 39°01′47″N 48°04′49″E
- Country: Iran
- Province: Ardabil
- County: Germi
- District: Central

Population (2016)
  - Total: 28,967
- Time zone: UTC+3:30 (IRST)

Germi (Persian: گرمی) (Note: Also romanized as Garmī and Germī; also known as Germi Ojarood) is a city in the Central District of Germi County, (Note: Formerly Moghan County) Ardabil province, Iran, serving as the capital of both the county and the district.

== Population ==
At the time of the 2006 National Census, the city's population was 28,348 in 6,382 households. The following census in 2011 counted 28,953 people in 7,491 households. The 2016 census measured the population as 28,967 people in 8,375 households.

== Climate ==
The city of Germi is located between two low mountain ranges features a warm climate in summers but pleasant and moderate weather in winter. Germi, like most parts of Iran, has a semi-arid climate with fairly hot summers and relatively cold winters. The climate of Germi is moderate and mild compared to most of the districts and cities of Ardebil province.

The climate of this city, especially in the east, is somewhat influenced by the climate of the Caspian region and its collapse, and most of its settlements in the valleys are exposed by the rapid winds that are in some of the province's cities such as Ardebil and Meshkinshahr. According to the 50 years precipitation statistics and records, the yearly average precipitation is 360 but annual precipitation varies between 200 mm and 450 mm and the average monthly temperature varies from -2.5 to 29.2 Celsius, allowing farmers to reach good yields in growing cereals.

Germi also has a lot of winds, but it's not usually sparse. Local people have given them different names, depending on the season, temperature, humidity, wind direction and intensity. Germi (the wind that is slow and partly warm between the plains of the area and its mountains), the Gechi-Qiran (the wind that flows from the north and is very cold) and the promise (which can be called the Saba breeze) is the same as the wind near the spring And Nowruz is gentle and delusional) are famous winds of the region, all of which have a mild speed.

It is said that Mohammad Reza Shah Pahlavi, one of the army's ambassadors, was in charge of traveling to the region in 1956 and the establishment of the city of Moghan. On the trip that took place in the summer, the military commander's wife complained of hot weather in other cities of Moghan, but when entering Germi, she was excited by the warm and elegant climate and said to her husband that no city was more deserving of warmth than Moghan. Then the rumors of the local elders and the order of land and land came to the aid because, due to the order of the transactions and the unilateralism of the people, their land became more formal than before, and by following the elders and relying on this warm welcome, the owner of the bank's branch And the General Court had decided to finalize the report of the General to serve the king and mention the strategic and military advantages of the city of Germi and the conditions of that day of the Cold War and the Soviet Union, the state and the court to determine the city of Tabriz as the center of the city.

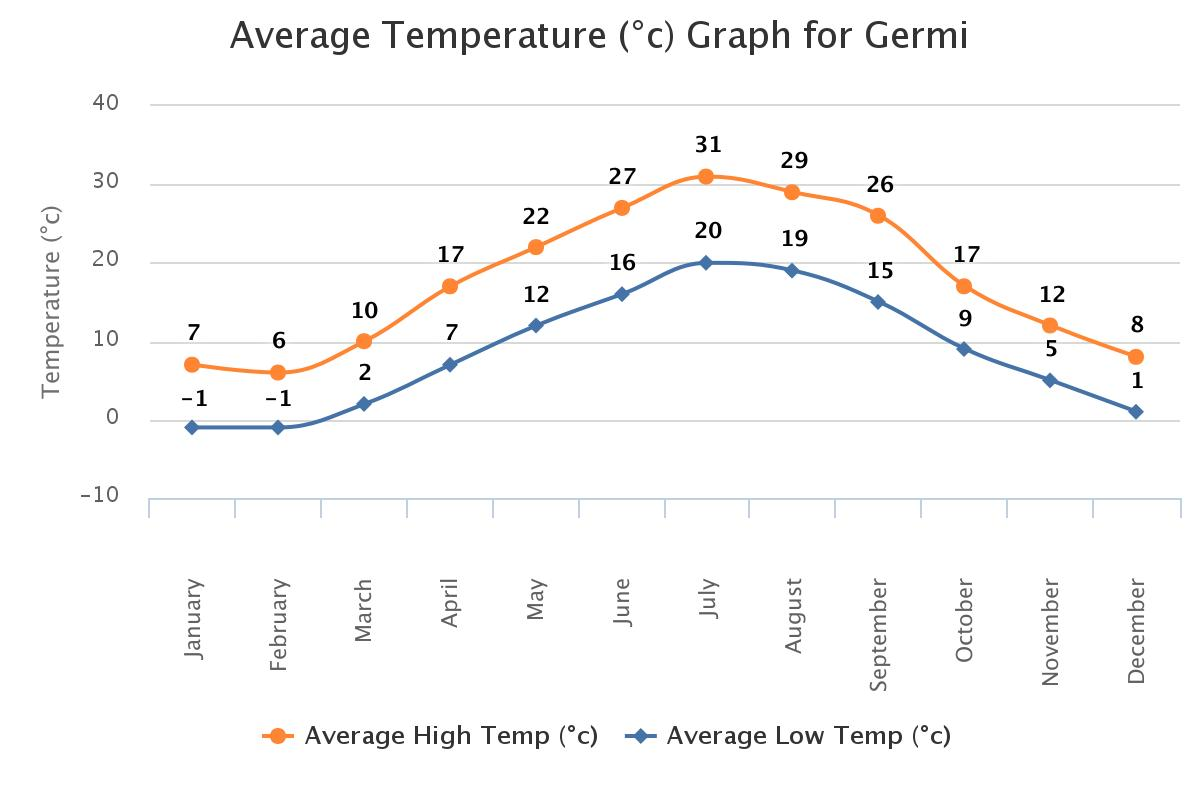
Germi Temperature Graph

The average temperature peak in July is up to 31 °C, while the average minimum temperature in the winter season in February is -1 °C. The maximum monthly average rainfall in November and May is 57 and 54 mm, respectively, and the minimum rainfall in July is 15 mm. The maximum monthly average of the days associated with the precipitation of the spring season in May is 13 days and the minimum is 5 days in the summer in July.

=== Germi Meteorological Station ===
Germi Meteorological Station is a synoptic meteorological station located at Germi city of Ardabil province of Iran. It is one of the main international synoptic stations which has been established to provide meteorological services, climate risk management and crisis management in the city of Germi. This station has a significant role in the production of various bulletins to predict the weather in the northern region of Ardabil province. Germi Meteorology prepares and broadcasts various hourly daily reports on the status of atmospheric parameters.Germi Meteorology helps people, especially farmers in Germi city, as well as travelers and tourists, in guiding and informing the weather and weather forecast. Most of the information of Germi Meteorological Station will be published on the website of the Iran Meteorological Organization.

== Notable people ==
- Habib Boromand Dashghapu, Shia cleric
- Kazem Mousavi, Shia cleric
- Mir Ghesmat Mosavi Asl, Shia cleric

== Gallery ==
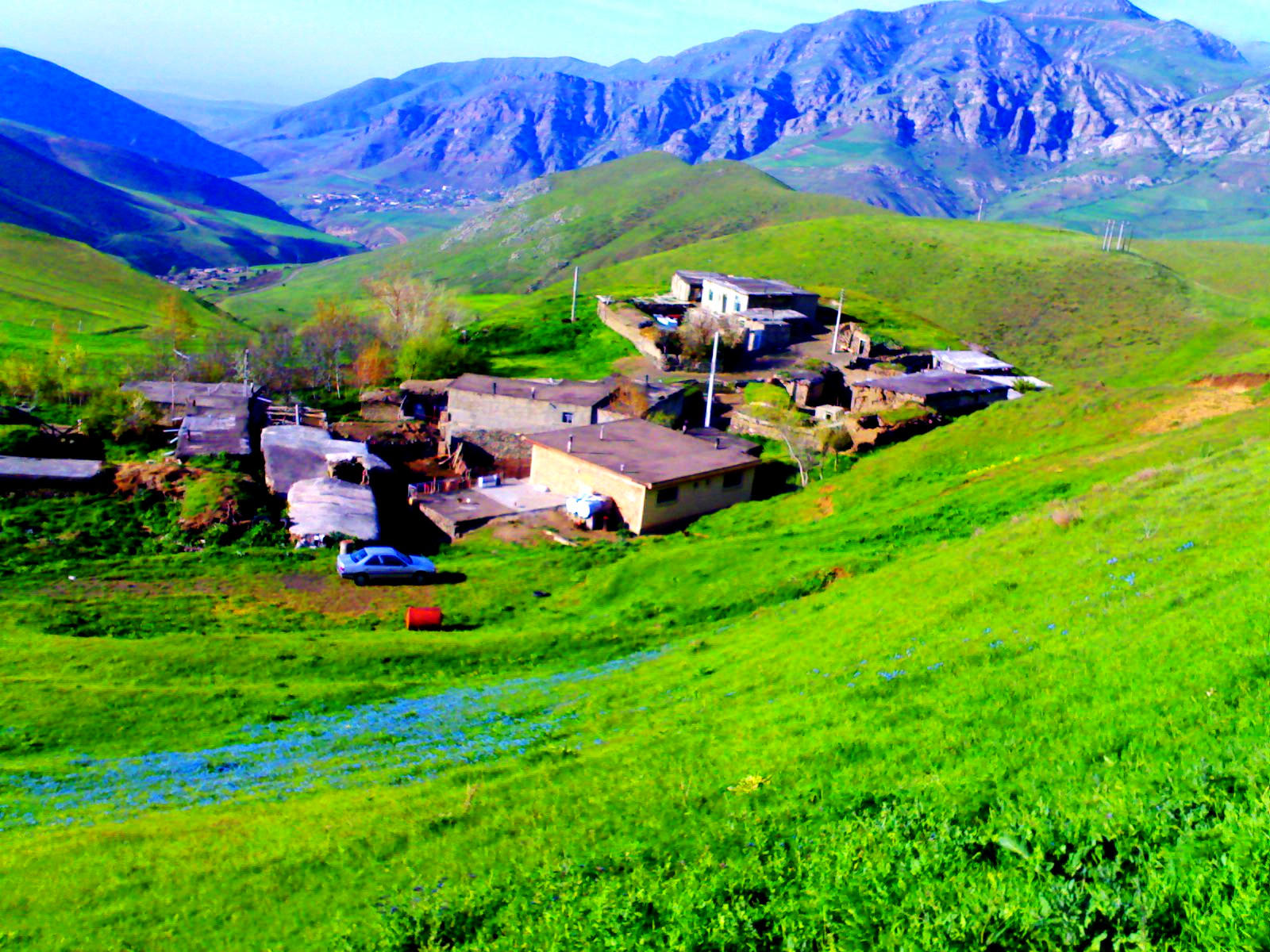
Khankandi village

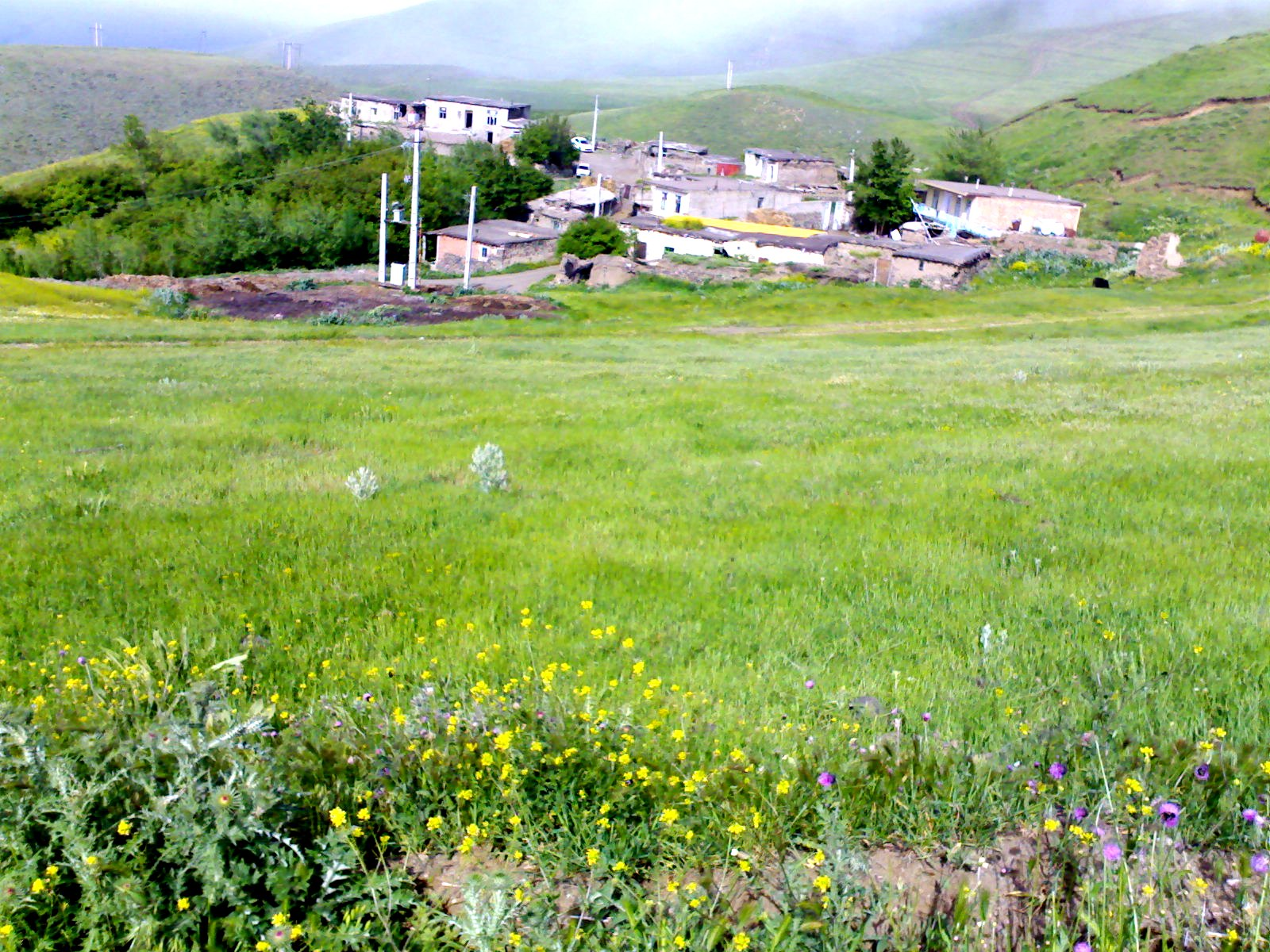
Khankandi village

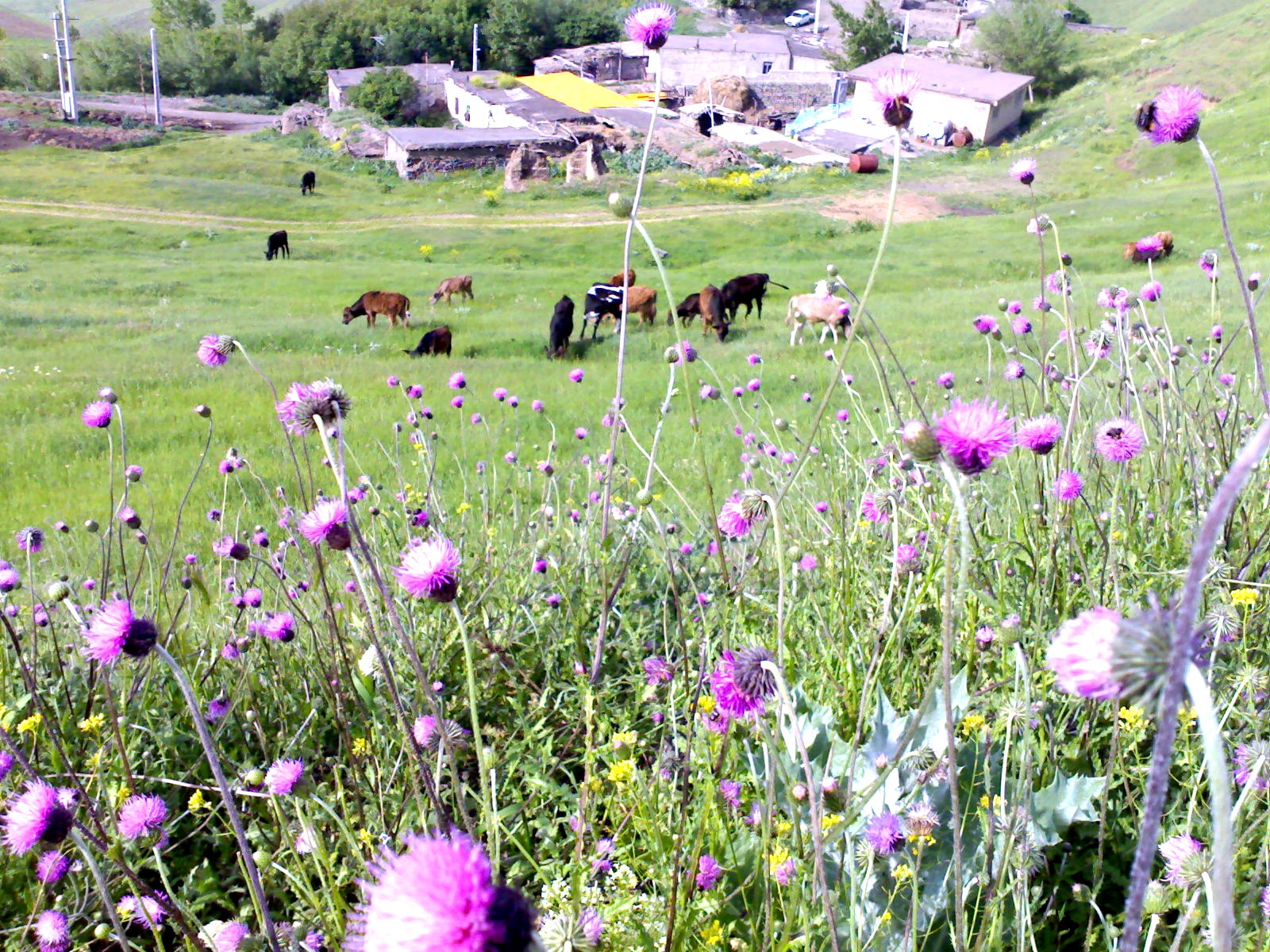
Khankandi village

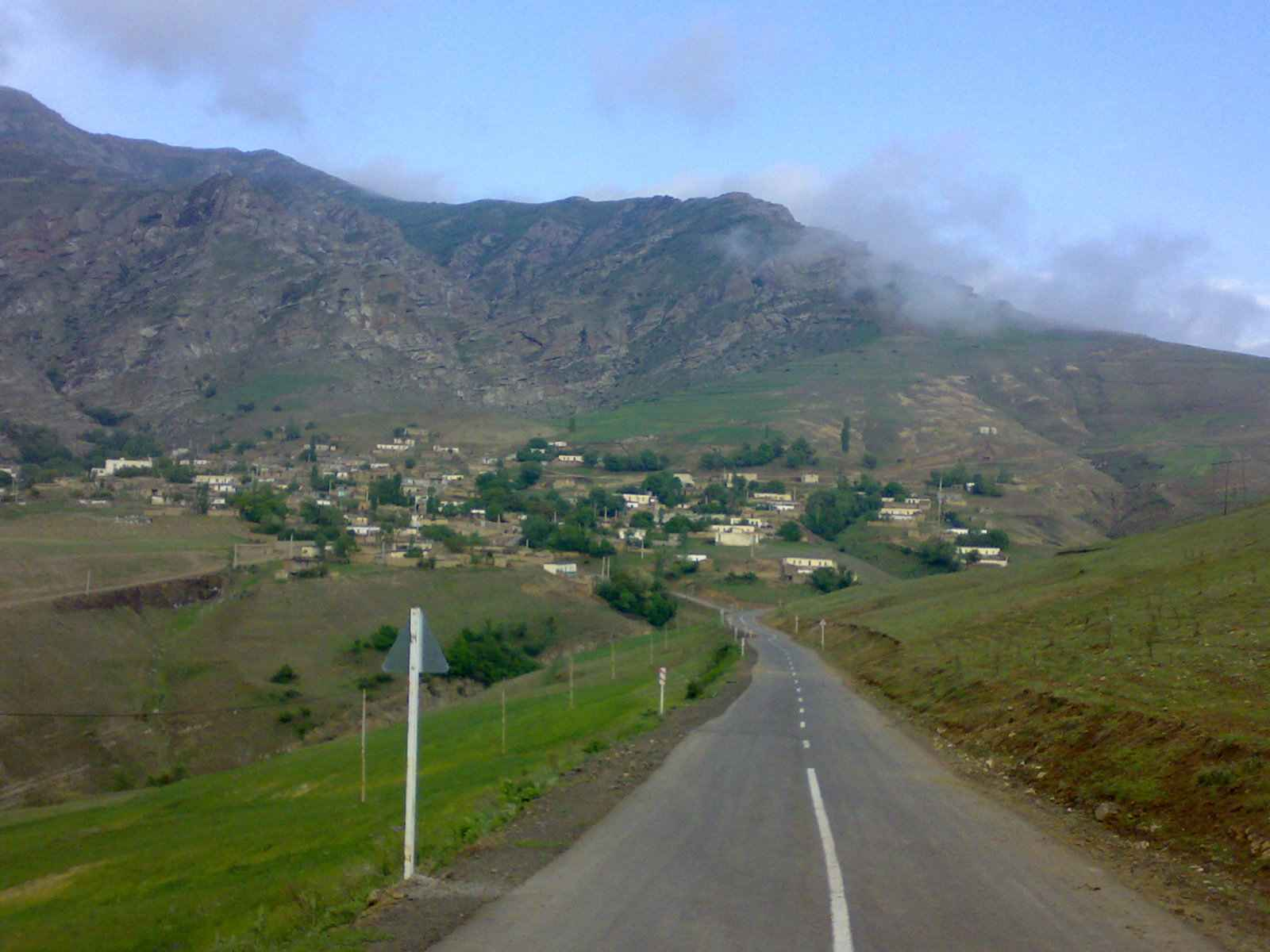
Tulun village

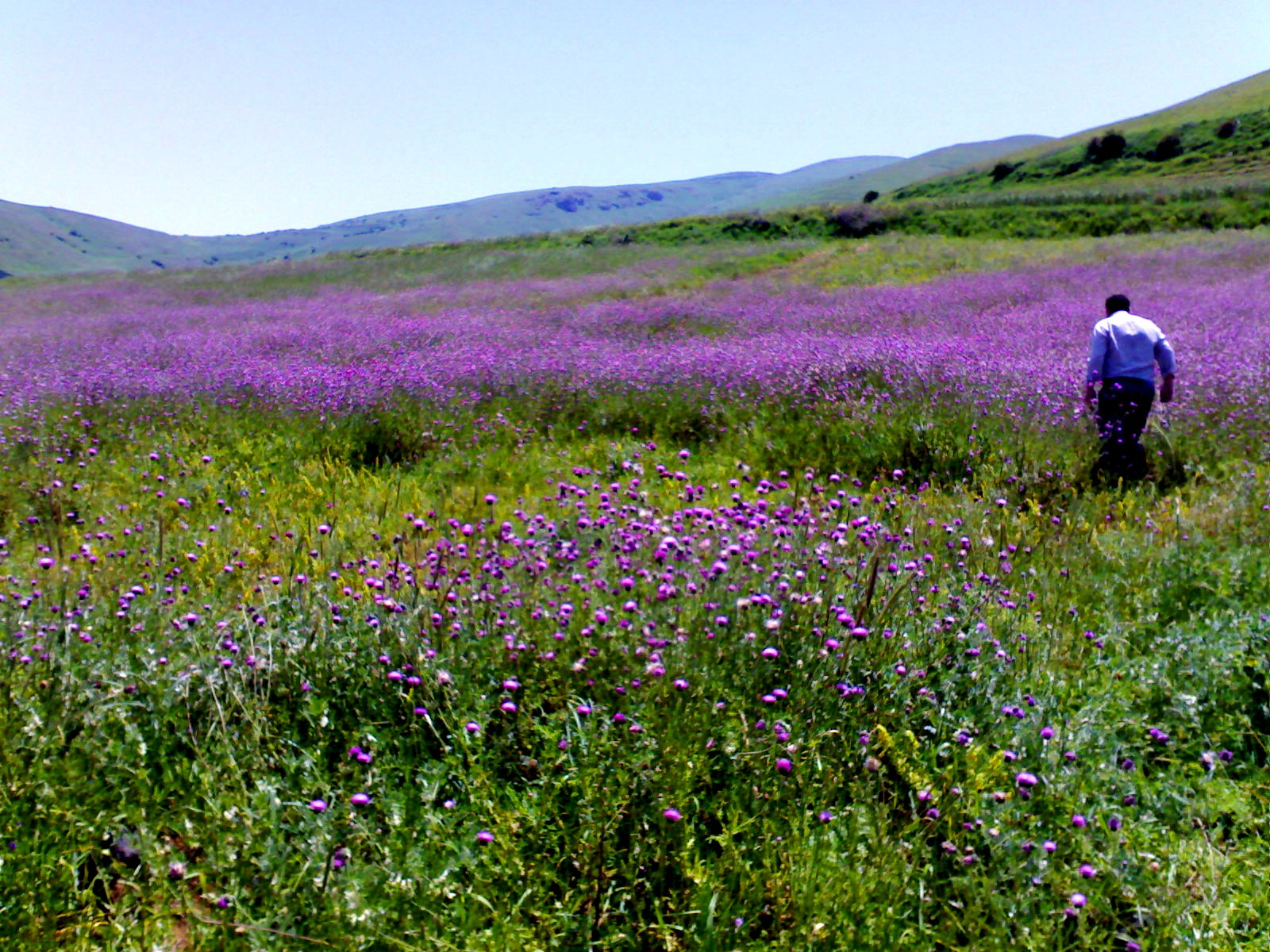
Khankandi spring nature

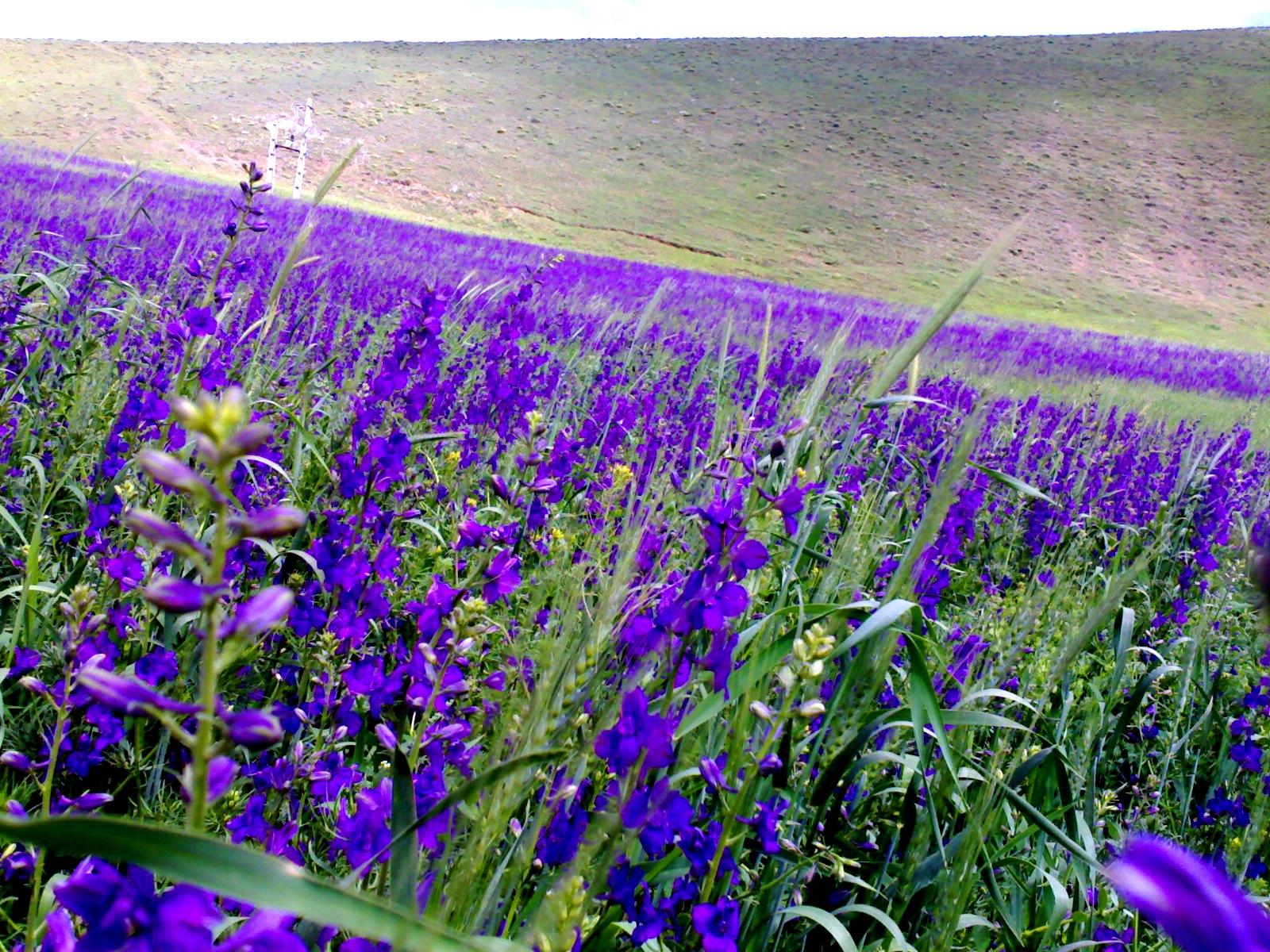
Khankandi Blue Flowers

== See also ==
- Khan kandi
- Tabriz
- Azerbaijan
