= Ojarud-e Markazi Rural District =

Rural district in Ardabil province, Iran

Ojarud-e Markazi Rural District Persian: دهستان اجارود مرکزی
- Rural District
- Location within Iran
- Coordinates: 39°05′N 48°10′E
- Country: Iran
- Province: Ardabil
- County: Germi
- District: Central
- Established: 1987
- Capital: Hamzah Khanlu

Population (2016)
  - Total: 1,304
- Time zone: UTC+3:30 (IRST)

Ojarud-e Markazi Rural District (Persian: دهستان اجارود مرکزی) is in the Central District of Germi County, (Note: Formerly Moghan County) Ardabil province, Iran. Its capital is the village of Hamzah Khanlu.

== Demographics ==
=== Population ===
At the time of the 2006 National Census, the rural district's population was 2,301 in 486 households. There were 1,772 inhabitants in 476 households at the following census of 2011. The 2016 census measured the population of the rural district as 1,304 in 404 households. The most populous of its 13 villages was Zengir, with 296 people.

=== Other villages in the rural district ===
- Al Qanab
- Amrahlu
- Azhdarlu
- Hasan Kandi
- Ilkhchi-ye Olya
- Ilkhchi-ye Sofla
- Khan Bolaghi
- Ojaq Alazar
- Qahramanlu
