= Ilkhechi, Hashtrud =

Ilkhechi ايلخچي
- Village
- Location within Iran
- Coordinates: 37°26′39″N 46°36′55″E
- Country: Iran
- Province: East Azerbaijan
- County: Hashtrud
- Bakhsh: Nazarkahrizi
- Rural District: Almalu

Population (2006)
  - Total: 204
- Time zone: UTC+3:30 (IRST)
  - Summer (DST): UTC+4:30 (IRDT)

Ilkhechi (Persian: ايلخچي, also Romanized as Īlkhechī; also known as Īlīkhchī) is a village in Almalu Rural District, Nazarkahrizi District, Hashtrud County, East Azerbaijan Province, Iran. At the 2006 census, its population was 204, in 37 families.
