= Ilchi-ye Bala =

Ilchi-ye Bala ايلچي بالا
- Village
- Location within Iran
- Coordinates: 27°13′14″N 55°07′20″E
- Country: Iran
- Province: Hormozgan
- County: Bastak
- Bakhsh: Central
- Rural District: Deh Tall

Population (2006)
  - Total: 25
- Time zone: UTC+3:30 (IRST)
  - Summer (DST): UTC+4:30 (IRDT)

Ilchi-ye Bala (Persian: ايلچي بالا, also Romanized as Īlchī-ye Bālā; also known as Īlchī) is a village in Deh Tall Rural District, in the Central District of Bastak County, Hormozgan Province, Iran. At the 2006 census, its population was 25, in 6 families.
