= Central District (Germi County) =

District in Ardabil province, Iran

Central District (Germi County) Persian: بخش مرکزی شهرستان گرمی
- District
- Location within Iran
- Coordinates: 39°02′N 48°05′E
- Country: Iran
- Province: Ardabil
- County: Germi
- Capital: Germi

Population (2016)
  - Total: 43,990
- Time zone: UTC+3:30 (IRST)

The Central District of Germi County (Note: Formerly Moghan County) (Persian: بخش مرکزی شهرستان گرمی) is in Ardabil province, Iran. Its capital is the city of Germi.

== History ==
In 2019, Pain Barzand Rural District was separated from Angut District (Note: Renamed the Central District of Ungut County) to join the Central District.

== Demographics ==
=== Population ===
At the time of the 2006 National Census, the district's population was 48,790 in 10,528 households. The following census in 2011 counted 47,449 people in 12,178 households. The 2016 census measured the population of the district as 43,990 inhabitants living in 12,869 households.

=== Administrative divisions ===
Central District (Germi County) Population
Administrative Divisions	2006	2011	2016
Ani RD	6,251	5,421	4,364
Ojarud-e Gharbi RD	7,849	7,775	6,523
Ojarud-e Markazi RD	2,301	1,772	1,304
Ojarud-e Shomali RD	4,041	3,528	2,832
Pain Barzand RD (Note: Transferred from Angut District after the 2016 census)			
Germi (city)	28,348	28,953	28,967
Total	48,790	47,449	43,990
RD = Rural District
