= Qeshlaq-e Qarah Darreh =

Qeshlaq-e Qarah Darreh (Persian: قشلاق قره دره) may refer to various places in Iran:

- Qeshlaq-e Qarah Darreh-ye Asam Khan Asad
- Qeshlaq-e Qarah Darreh-ye Asam Khan Azadkhan
- Qeshlaq-e Qarah Darreh-ye Asam Khan Hajj Sadallah
- Qeshlaq-e Qarah Darreh-ye Asam Khan Khan Kishi
- Qeshlaq-e Qarah Darreh-ye Asam Khan Safar Kandi
- Qeshlaq-e Qarah Darreh-ye Asam Khan Tahraj
- Qeshlaq-e Qarah Darreh-ye Aziz Rostam
- Qeshlaq-e Qarah Darreh-ye Hajji Alish
- Qeshlaq-e Qarah Darreh-ye Kahel Qeshlaq Farasat
- Qeshlaq-e Qarah Darreh-ye Kahel va Qeshlaq-e Hajji Shahverdi
