= Qeshlaq-e Khan =

Qeshlaq-e Khan (Persian: قشلاق خان) may refer to several places in Iran:

- Qeshlaq-e Khan Goldi Bala Owghlan
- Qeshlaq-e Khan Goldi Davakishi
- Qeshlaq-e Khan Goldi Hajj Ahmad
- Qeshlaq-e Khan Goldi Kamaran
- Qeshlaq-e Khan Goldi Mostanlu
- Qeshlaq-e Khan Goldi Ogham Owghlan
- Qeshlaq-e Khan Hoseyn Vadelan Hajj Mohammad Taqi
- Qeshlaq-e Khan Hoseyn Vadelan Teymur
- Qeshlaq-e Khan Owghlan
- Qeshlaq-e Khaneh-ye Barq
