= Qeshlaq Aghdash =

Qeshlaq Aghdash (Persian: قشلاق اغداش) may refer to:

- Qeshlaq Aghdash-e Bahram
- Qeshlaq Aghdash-e Beyglar
- Qeshlaq Aghdash-e Hajji Saram
- Qeshlaq Aghdash-e Hasan Hazi Owghli
- Qeshlaq Aghdash-e Kalam
- Qeshlaq Aghdash-e Mahmud
- Qeshlaq Aghdash-e Mokhtar
- Qeshlaq Aghdash-e Nasir
