= Qeshlaq-e Khan Goldi =

Qeshlaq-e Khan Goldi (Persian: قشلاق خان گلدي) may refer to:

- Qeshlaq-e Khan Goldi Bala Owghlan
- Qeshlaq-e Khan Goldi Davakishi
- Qeshlaq-e Khan Goldi Hajj Ahmad
- Qeshlaq-e Khan Goldi Kamaran
- Qeshlaq-e Khan Goldi Mostanlu
- Qeshlaq-e Khan Goldi Ogham Owghlan
