= Qeshlaq-e Owch =

Qeshlaq-e Owch (Persian: قشلاق اوچ) may refer to several places in Iran:

- Qeshlaq-e Owch Bolagh
- Qeshlaq-e Owch Bolaq
- Qeshlaq-e Owch Daraq-e Olya
- Qeshlaq-e Owch Darreh Ali Shahamati
- Qeshlaq-e Owch Darreh ol Tafat
- Qeshlaq-e Owch Darreh Savad
- Qeshlaq-e Owch Quyi Ali Akbar
- Qeshlaq-e Owch Quyi Hajj Hasan Shayiqi
