= Qusha Qeshlaq =

Qusha Qeshlaq (Persian: قوشاقشلاق) may refer to:

- Qusha Qeshlaq-e Khasai
- Qusha Qeshlaq-e Mansur va Rahman
- Qusha Qeshlaq-e Qambai
- Qusha Qeshlaq-e Rezali Beyg
