= Qeshlaq-e Baqersoli =

Qeshlaq-e Baqersoli (Persian: قشلاق باقرسلي) may refer to:

- Qeshlaq-e Baqersoli Ali Sahami
- Qeshlaq-e Baqersoli Hajj Khan Ali
- Qeshlaq-e Baqersoli Satar
