= Qeshlaq-e Beyg Ali =

Qeshlaq-e Beyg Ali (Persian: قشلاق بيگ علي) may refer to:

- Qeshlaq-e Beyg Ali-ye Olya
- Qeshlaq-e Beyg Ali-ye Sofla
- Qeshlaq-e Beyg Ali-ye Vosta
