= Qeshlaq-e Nariman =

Qeshlaq-e Nariman (Persian: قشلاق نريمان) may refer to:

- Qeshlaq-e Nariman Kandi Amir Aslan
- Qeshlaq-e Nariman Kandi Hajj Khan Owghlan
- Qeshlaq-e Nariman Kandi Hajji Havar
