= Qeshlaq-e Galam Ali =

Qeshlaq-e Galam Ali (Persian: قشلاق گلمعلي) may refer to:

- Qeshlaq-e Galam Ali Hajj Hoseyn
- Qeshlaq-e Galam Ali Hajj Savad
- Qeshlaq-e Galam Ali Safar
