= Qeshlaq-e Padar =

Qeshlaq-e Padar (Persian: قشلاق پادار) may refer to:

- Qeshlaq-e Padar Eys Khan
- Qeshlaq-e Padar Hajj Safar Ali
- Qeshlaq-e Padar Hajji Bahrish
- Qeshlaq-e Padarjamal
