= Abish =

Abish may refer to:

== Places ==
=== Iran ===
- Abish Ahmad District
  - Abish Ahmad, a city and the capital of Abish Ahmad District
- Abish Ahmad Rural District
- Qeshlaq-e Hajj Abish (disambiguation), several villages

=== Azerbaijan ===
- Abish-Kyand, a village in Azerbaijan

== Other ==
- Abish (name), a unisex given name and surname
