= Khalifehlu Kandi-ye Bozorg =

Village in Ardabil province, Iran

Khalifehlu Kandi-ye Bozorg Persian: خليفه لوكندي بزرگ
- Village
- Location within Iran
- Coordinates: 39°21′47″N 47°57′59″E
- Country: Iran
- Province: Ardabil
- County: Bileh Savar
- District: Qeshlaq Dasht
- Rural District: Qeshlaq-e Sharqi

Population (2016)
  - Total: 823
- Time zone: UTC+3:30 (IRST)

Khalifehlu Kandi-ye Bozorg (Persian: خليفه لوكندي بزرگ) (Note: Also romanized as Khalīfehlū Kandī-ye Bozorg; also known as Qeshlāq-e Khalīfehlū) is a village in Qeshlaq-e Sharqi Rural District of Qeshlaq Dasht District in Bileh Savar County, Ardabil province, Iran.

== Demographics ==
=== Population ===
At the time of the 2006 National Census, the village's population was 754 in 142 households. The following census in 2011 counted 742 people in 180 households. The 2016 census measured the population of the village as 823 people in 226 households.
