= Vali Mamilu =

Village in Ardabil province, Iran

Vali Mamilu Persian: ولي مميلو
- Village
- Location within Iran
- Coordinates: 39°23′28″N 47°59′23″E
- Country: Iran
- Province: Ardabil
- County: Bileh Savar
- District: Qeshlaq Dasht
- Rural District: Qeshlaq-e Sharqi

Population (2016)
  - Total: 334
- Time zone: UTC+3:30 (IRST)

Vali Mamilu (Persian: ولي مميلو) (Note: Also romanized as Valī Mamīlū) is a village in Qeshlaq-e Sharqi Rural District of Qeshlaq Dasht District in Bileh Savar County, Ardabil province, Iran.

== Demographics ==
=== Population ===
At the time of the 2006 National Census, the village's population was 271 in 49 households. The following census in 2011 counted 307 people in 69 households. The 2016 census measured the population of the village as 334 people in 96 households.
