= Qeshlaq-e Hajj Hashem-e Nosrat =

Village in Ardabil province, Iran

Qeshlaq-e Hajj Hashem-e Nosrat Persian: قشلاق حاجي هاشم نصرت
- Village
- Location within Iran
- Coordinates: 39°25′00″N 47°47′46″E
- Country: Iran
- Province: Ardabil
- County: Bileh Savar
- District: Qeshlaq Dasht
- Rural District: Qeshlaq-e Sharqi

Population (2016)
  - Total: 19
- Time zone: UTC+3:30 (IRST)

Qeshlaq-e Hajj Hashem-e Nosrat (Persian: قشلاق حاجي هاشم نصرت) (Note: Also romanized as Qeshlāq-e Ḩājj Hāshem-e Noşrat) is a village in Qeshlaq-e Sharqi Rural District of Qeshlaq Dasht District in Bileh Savar County, Ardabil province, Iran.

== Demographics ==
=== Population ===
At the time of the 2006 National Census, the village's population was below the reporting threshold. The following census in 2011 counted 18 people in five households. The 2016 census measured the population of the village as 19 people in six households.
