= Ruh Kandi =

Village in Ardabil province, Iran

Ruh Kandi Persian: روح كندي
- Village
- Location within Iran
- Coordinates: 39°24′20″N 48°11′28″E
- Country: Iran
- Province: Ardabil
- County: Bileh Savar
- District: Qeshlaq Dasht
- Rural District: Qeshlaq-e Sharqi

Population (2016)
  - Total: 1,576
- Time zone: UTC+3:30 (IRST)

Ruh Kandi (Persian: روح كندي) (Note: Also romanized as Rūḩ Kandī; also known as Orūf Kandī) is a village in Qeshlaq-e Sharqi Rural District of Qeshlaq Dasht District in Bileh Savar County, Ardabil province, Iran.

== Demographics ==
=== Population ===
At the time of the 2006 National Census, the village's population was 1,470 in 307 households. The following census in 2011 counted 1,671 people in 379 households. The 2016 census measured the population of the village as 1,576 people in 437 households. It was the most populous village in its rural district.
