= Khvor Khvor-e Olya =

Village in Ardabil province, Iran

Khvor Khvor-e Olya Persian: خورخورعليا
- Village
- Location within Iran
- Coordinates: 39°20′23″N 48°01′42″E
- Country: Iran
- Province: Ardabil
- County: Bileh Savar
- District: Qeshlaq Dasht
- Rural District: Qeshlaq-e Sharqi

Population (2016)
  - Total: 35
- Time zone: UTC+3:30 (IRST)

Khvor Khvor-e Olya (Persian: خورخورعليا) (Note: Also romanized as Khvor Khvor-e ‘Olyā and Khūr Khūr-e ‘Olyā) is a village in Qeshlaq-e Sharqi Rural District of Qeshlaq Dasht District in Bileh Savar County, Ardabil province, Iran.

== Demographics ==
=== Population ===
At the time of the 2006 National Census, the village's population was 191 in 48 households. The following census in 2011 counted 61 people in 17 households. The 2016 census measured the population of the village as 35 people in 13 households.
