= Qeshlaq-e Jafar Qoli =

Village in Ardabil province, Iran

Qeshlaq-e Jafar Qoli Persian: قشلاق جعفرقلي
- Village
- Location within Iran
- Country: Iran
- Province: Ardabil
- County: Bileh Savar
- District: Qeshlaq Dasht
- Rural District: Qeshlaq-e Sharqi

Population (2016)
  - Total: 19
- Time zone: UTC+3:30 (IRST)

Qeshlaq-e Jafar Qoli (Persian: قشلاق جعفرقلي) (Note: Also romanized as Qeshlāq-e Ja‘far Qolī; also known as Qarah Bāghlī and Qeshlāq-e Ja‘far Qolī Khān) is a village in Qeshlaq-e Sharqi Rural District of Qeshlaq Dasht District in Bileh Savar County, Ardabil province, Iran.

== Demographics ==
=== Population ===
At the time of the 2006 National Census, the village's population was 41 in seven households. The following census in 2011 counted 17 people in four households. The 2016 census measured the population of the village as 19 people in five households.
