= Qeshlaq-e Qarqoli Rahim Talebi =

Village in Ardabil province, Iran

Qeshlaq-e Qarqoli Rahim Talebi Persian: قشلاق قارقلي رحيم طالبي
- Village
- Location within Iran
- Coordinates: 39°27′25″N 47°59′02″E
- Country: Iran
- Province: Ardabil
- County: Bileh Savar
- District: Qeshlaq Dasht
- Rural District: Qeshlaq-e Sharqi

Population (2016)
  - Total: 29
- Time zone: UTC+3:30 (IRST)

Qeshlaq-e Qarqoli Rahim Talebi (Persian: قشلاق قارقلي رحيم طالبي) (Note: Also romanized as Qeshlāq-e Qārqolī Raḥīm Ţālebī) is a village in Qeshlaq-e Sharqi Rural District of Qeshlaq Dasht District in Bileh Savar County, Ardabil province, Iran.

== Demographics ==
=== Population ===
At the time of the 2006 National Census, the village's population was 26 in six households. The following census in 2011 counted 27 people in seven households. The 2016 census measured the population of the village as 29 people in seven households.
