= Qeshlaq-e Hajji Savad =

Village in Ardabil province, Iran

Qeshlaq-e Hajji Savad Persian: قشلاق حاجي سواد
- Village
- Location within Iran
- Coordinates: 39°27′39″N 48°09′29″E
- Country: Iran
- Province: Ardabil
- County: Bileh Savar
- District: Qeshlaq Dasht
- Rural District: Qeshlaq-e Sharqi

Population (2016)
  - Total: 42
- Time zone: UTC+3:30 (IRST)

Qeshlaq-e Hajji Savad (Persian: قشلاق حاجي سواد) (Note: Also romanized as Qeshlāq-e Ḩājj Savād; also known as Qeshlāq-e Mehdī Khān) is a village in Qeshlaq-e Sharqi Rural District of Qeshlaq Dasht District in Bileh Savar County, Ardabil province, Iran.

== Demographics ==
=== Population ===
At the time of the 2006 National Census, the village's population was 93 in 21 households. The following census in 2011 counted 83 people in 22 households. The 2016 census measured the population of the village as 42 people in 13 households.
