= Qeshlaq-e Owch Darreh Ali Shahamati =

Village in Ardabil province, Iran

Qeshlaq-e Owch Darreh Ali Shahamati Persian: قشلاق اوچ دره علي شهامتي
- Village
- Country: Iran
- Province: Ardabil
- County: Bileh Savar
- District: Qeshlaq Dasht
- Rural District: Qeshlaq-e Sharqi

Population (2016)
  - Total: 17
- Time zone: UTC+3:30 (IRST)

Qeshlaq-e Owch Darreh Ali Shahamati (Persian: قشلاق اوچ دره علي شهامتي) (Note: Also romanized as Qeshlāq-e Owch Darreh ʿAlī Shahāmatī) is a village in Qeshlaq-e Sharqi Rural District of Qeshlaq Dasht District in Bileh Savar County, Ardabil province, Iran.

== Demographics ==
=== Population ===
At the time of the 2006 National Census, the village's population was 18 in four households. The following census in 2011 counted 15 people in four households. The 2016 census measured the population of the village as 17 people in five households.
