= Qeshlaq-e Aqa Khan-e Ekhtiar =

Village in Ardabil province, Iran

Qeshlaq-e Aqa Khan-e Ekhtiar Persian: قشلاق اقاخان اختيار
- Village
- Location within Iran
- Country: Iran
- Province: Ardabil
- County: Bileh Savar
- District: Qeshlaq Dasht
- Rural District: Qeshlaq-e Sharqi

Population (2016)
  - Total: 40
- Time zone: UTC+3:30 (IRST)

Qeshlaq-e Aqa Khan-e Ekhtiar (Persian: قشلاق اقاخان اختيار) (Note: Also romanized as Qeshlāq-e Āqā Khān-e Ekhtīār; also known as Zendehābād) is a village in Qeshlaq-e Sharqi Rural District of Qeshlaq Dasht District in Bileh Savar County, Ardabil province, Iran.

== Demographics ==
=== Population ===
At the time of the 2006 National Census, the village's population was 43 in five households. The following census in 2011 counted 54 people in 17 households. The 2016 census measured the population of the village as 40 people in nine households.
