= Qeshlaq-e Hajj Hashem-e Neysar =

Village in Ardabil province, Iran

Qeshlaq-e Hajj Hashem-e Neysar Persian: قشلاق حاج هاشم نيصر
- Village
- Location within Iran
- Coordinates: 39°24′05″N 47°46′47″E
- Country: Iran
- Province: Ardabil
- County: Bileh Savar
- District: Qeshlaq Dasht
- Rural District: Qeshlaq-e Sharqi

Population (2016)
  - Total: 29
- Time zone: UTC+3:30 (IRST)

Qeshlaq-e Hajj Hashem-e Neysar (Persian: قشلاق حاج هاشم نيصر) (Note: Also romanized as Qeshlāq-e Ḩājj Hāshem-e Neyşar; also known as Qeshlāq-e Ḩājjī Hāshem and Qeshlāq-e Ḩājjī Hāshem-e Naşīr) is a village in Qeshlaq-e Sharqi Rural District of Qeshlaq Dasht District in Bileh Savar County, Ardabil province, Iran.

== Demographics ==
=== Population ===
At the time of the 2006 National Census, the village's population was 29 in eight households. The following census in 2011 counted 31 people in eight households. The 2016 census measured the population of the village as 29 people in nine households.
