= Qeshlaq-e Hajj Heydar Farman =

Village in Ardabil province, Iran

Qeshlaq-e Hajj Heydar Farman Persian: قشلاق حاج حيدرفرمان
- Village
- Country: Iran
- Province: Ardabil
- County: Bileh Savar
- District: Qeshlaq Dasht
- Rural District: Qeshlaq-e Sharqi

Population (2016)
  - Total: 68
- Time zone: UTC+3:30 (IRST)

Qeshlaq-e Hajj Heydar Farman (Persian: قشلاق حاج حيدرفرمان) (Note: Also romanized as Qeshlāq-e Ḩājj Ḩeydar Farmān) is a village in Qeshlaq-e Sharqi Rural District of Qeshlaq Dasht District in Bileh Savar County, Ardabil province, Iran.

== Demographics ==
=== Population ===
At the time of the 2006 National Census, the village's population was 72 in 18 households. The following census in 2011 counted 62 people in 17 households. The 2016 census measured the population of the village as 68 people in 19 households.
