= Hajji Havar Kandi =

Village in Ardabil province, Iran

Hajji Havar Kandi Persian: حاجي هاواركندي
- Village
- Location within Iran
- Coordinates: 39°21′23″N 47°59′55″E
- Country: Iran
- Province: Ardabil
- County: Bileh Savar
- District: Qeshlaq Dasht
- Rural District: Qeshlaq-e Sharqi

Population (2016)
  - Total: 41
- Time zone: UTC+3:30 (IRST)

Hajji Havar Kandi (Persian: حاجي هاواركندي) (Note: Also romanized as Ḩājjī Hāvār Kandī) is a village in Qeshlaq-e Sharqi Rural District of Qeshlaq Dasht District in Bileh Savar County, Ardabil province, Iran.

== Demographics ==
=== Population ===
At the time of the 2006 National Census, the village's population was 57 in 15 households. The following census in 2011 counted 38 people in 12 households. The 2016 census measured the population of the village as 41 people in 11 households.
