= Qeshlaq-e Hajj Soleyman-e Akbar Keramati =

Village in Ardabil province, Iran

Qeshlaq-e Hajj Soleyman-e Akbar Keramati Persian: قشلاق حاج سليمان اكبركرامتي
- Village
- Location within Iran
- Coordinates: 39°27′00″N 48°03′26″E
- Country: Iran
- Province: Ardabil
- County: Bileh Savar
- District: Qeshlaq Dasht
- Rural District: Qeshlaq-e Sharqi

Population (2016)
  - Total: 31
- Time zone: UTC+3:30 (IRST)

Qeshlaq-e Hajj Soleyman-e Akbar Keramati (Persian: قشلاق حاج سليمان اكبركرامتي) (Note: Also romanized as Qeshlāq-e Ḩājj Soleymān-e Akbar Kerāmatī; also known as Qeshlāq-e Soleymān Akbar) is a village in Qeshlaq-e Sharqi Rural District of Qeshlaq Dasht District in Bileh Savar County, Ardabil province, Iran.

== Demographics ==
=== Population ===
At the time of the 2006 National Census, the village's population was 33 in six households. The following census in 2011 counted 32 people in nine households. The 2016 census measured the population of the village as 31 people in eight households.
