= Qeshlaq-e Sufi Qadir =

Village in Ardabil province, Iran

Qeshlaq-e Sufi Qadir Persian: قشلاق صوفي قدير
- Village
- Location within Iran
- Coordinates: 39°26′31″N 47°50′42″E
- Country: Iran
- Province: Ardabil
- County: Bileh Savar
- District: Qeshlaq Dasht
- Rural District: Qeshlaq-e Sharqi

Population (2016)
  - Total: 34
- Time zone: UTC+3:30 (IRST)

Qeshlaq-e Sufi Qadir (Persian: قشلاق صوفي قدير) (Note: Also romanized as Qeshlāq-e Şūfī Qadīr) is a village in Qeshlaq-e Sharqi Rural District of Qeshlaq Dasht District in Bileh Savar County, Ardabil province, Iran.

== Demographics ==
=== Population ===
At the time of the 2006 National Census, the village's population was 38 in 11 households. The following census in 2011 counted 15 people in five households. The 2016 census measured the population of the village as 34 people in 10 households.
