= Petelqan =

Village in Ardabil province, Iran

Petelqan Persian: پتلقان
- Village
- Location within Iran
- Coordinates: 39°22′08″N 48°03′00″E
- Country: Iran
- Province: Ardabil
- County: Bileh Savar
- District: Qeshlaq Dasht
- Rural District: Qeshlaq-e Sharqi

Population (2016)
  - Total: 34
- Time zone: UTC+3:30 (IRST)

Petelqan (Persian: پتلقان) (Note: Also romanized as Petelqān)) is a village in Qeshlaq-e Sharqi Rural District of Qeshlaq Dasht District in Bileh Savar County, Ardabil province, Iran.

== Demographics ==
=== Population ===
At the time of the 2006 National Census, the village's population was 54 in 13 households. The following census in 2011 counted 48 people in 13 households. The 2016 census measured the population of the village as 34 people in 11 households.
