= Gurdigol =

Village in Ardabil province, Iran

Gurdigol Persian: گورديگل
- Village
- Location within Iran
- Coordinates: 39°31′03″N 48°08′03″E
- Country: Iran
- Province: Ardabil
- County: Bileh Savar
- District: Qeshlaq Dasht
- Rural District: Qeshlaq-e Sharqi

Population (2016)
  - Total: 278
- Time zone: UTC+3:30 (IRST)

Gurdigol (Persian: گورديگل) (Note: Also romanized as Gūrdīgol; also known as Gūrdīgol-e ‘Olyā) is a village in Qeshlaq-e Sharqi Rural District of Qeshlaq Dasht District in Bileh Savar County, Ardabil province, Iran.

== Demographics ==
=== Population ===
At the time of the 2006 National Census, the village's population was 267 in 65 households. The following census in 2011 counted 297 people in 73 households. The 2016 census measured the population of the village as 278 people in 78 households.
