= Azizabad, Bileh Savar =

Village in Ardabil province, Iran

Azizabad Persian: عزيزاباد
- Village
- Location within Iran
- Coordinates: 39°28′00″N 48°04′06″E
- Country: Iran
- Province: Ardabil
- County: Bileh Savar
- District: Qeshlaq Dasht
- Rural District: Qeshlaq-e Sharqi

Population (2016)
  - Total: 138
- Time zone: UTC+3:30 (IRST)

Azizabad (Persian: عزيزاباد) (Note: Also romanized as ‘Azīzābād; also known as ‘Azīz Kandī) is a village in Qeshlaq-e Sharqi Rural District of Qeshlaq Dasht District in Bileh Savar County, Ardabil province, Iran.

== Demographics ==
=== Population ===
At the time of the 2006 National Census, the village's population was 168 in 40 households. The following census in 2011 counted 162 people in 37 households. The 2016 census measured the population of the village as 138 people in 40 households.
