= Qeshlaq-e Molla Naqi =

Qeshlaq-e Molla Naqi (Persian: قشلاق ملانقي) may refer to:

- Qeshlaq-e Molla Naqi Aqam Owghlan
- Qeshlaq-e Molla Naqi Qanbar
