= Qeshlaq-e Shah Khanem =

Qeshlaq-e Shah Khanem (Persian: قشلاق شاه خانم) may refer to:

- Qeshlaq-e Shah Khanem Ali Borat
- Qeshlaq-e Shah Khanem Gol Aqa
- Qeshlaq-e Shah Khanem Qadir
