= Qeshlaq-e Hajj Aman =

Village in Ardabil province, Iran

Qeshlaq-e Hajj Aman Persian: قشلاق حاج امن
- Village
- Location within Iran
- Country: Iran
- Province: Ardabil
- County: Bileh Savar
- District: Qeshlaq Dasht
- Rural District: Qeshlaq-e Sharqi

Population (2016)
  - Total: 67
- Time zone: UTC+3:30 (IRST)

Qeshlaq-e Hajj Aman (Persian: قشلاق حاج امن) (Note: Also romanized as Qeshlāq-e Ḩājj Aman) is a village in Qeshlaq-e Sharqi Rural District of Qeshlaq Dasht District in Bileh Savar County, Ardabil province, Iran.

== Demographics ==
=== Population ===
At the time of the 2006 National Census, the village's population was 111 in 24 households. The following census in 2011 counted 85 people in 23 households. The 2016 census measured the population of the village as 67 people in 20 households.
