= Qeshlaq-e Qarah Jalu =

Qeshlaq-e Qarah Jalu (Persian: قشلاق قره جالو) may refer to:

- Qeshlaq-e Qarah Jalu Hajji Iman
- Qeshlaq-e Qarah Jalu Hajji Sadeq
