= Hajji Baba Khan =

Hajji Baba Khan or Hajji Babakhan (Persian: حاجي باباخان) may refer to:

- Hajji Baba Khan, Ardabil, a village in Qeshlaq-e Sharqi Rural District, Ardabil Province
- Hajji Babakhan, Sistan and Baluchestan, a village in Dust Mohammad Rural District
