= Qeshlaq-e Hajj Hoseyn Khan =

Village in Ardabil province, Iran

Qeshlaq-e Hajj Hoseyn Khan Persian: قشلاق حاج حسين خان
- Village
- Country: Iran
- Province: Ardabil
- County: Bileh Savar
- District: Qeshlaq Dasht
- Rural District: Qeshlaq-e Sharqi

Population (2016)
  - Total: Below reporting threshold
- Time zone: UTC+3:30 (IRST)

Qeshlaq-e Hajj Hoseyn Khan (Persian: قشلاق حاج حسين خان) (Note: Also romanized as Qeshlāq-e Ḩājj Ḩoseyn Khān) is a village in Qeshlaq-e Sharqi Rural District of Qeshlaq Dasht District in Bileh Savar County, Ardabil province, Iran.

== Demographics ==
=== Population ===
At the time of the 2006 National Census, the village's population was 139 in 31 households. The following census in 2011 counted 18 people in four households. The 2016 census measured the population of the village as below the reporting threshold.
