= Gurdigol-e Nur ol Din =

Village in Ardabil province, Iran

Gurdigol-e Nur ol Din Persian: گورديگل نورالدين
- Village
- Location within Iran
- Coordinates: 39°31′54″N 48°07′33″E
- Country: Iran
- Province: Ardabil
- County: Bileh Savar
- District: Qeshlaq Dasht
- Rural District: Qeshlaq-e Sharqi

Population (2016)
  - Total: 102
- Time zone: UTC+3:30 (IRST)

Gurdigol-e Nur ol Din (Persian: گورديگل نورالدين) (Note: Also romanized as Gūrdīgol-e Nūr ol Dīn; also known as Gurdigol-e Nur ed Din, also romanized as Gūrdīgol-e Nūr ed Dīn) is a village in Qeshlaq-e Sharqi Rural District of Qeshlaq Dasht District in Bileh Savar County, Ardabil province, Iran.

== Demographics ==
=== Population ===
At the time of the 2006 National Census, the village's population was 112 in 21 households. The following census in 2011 counted 115 people in 29 households. The 2016 census measured the population of the village as 102 people in 29 households.
