= Qeshlaq-e Ali Shobani =

Village in Ardabil province, Iran

Qeshlaq-e Ali Shobani Persian: قشلاق الي شعباني
- Village
- Country: Iran
- Province: Ardabil
- County: Bileh Savar
- District: Qeshlaq Dasht
- Rural District: Qeshlaq-e Sharqi

Population (2016)
  - Total: 127
- Time zone: UTC+3:30 (IRST)

Qeshlaq-e Ali Shobani (Persian: قشلاق الي شعباني) (Note: Also romanized as Qeshlāq-e Alī Shoʿbānī) is a village in Qeshlaq-e Sharqi Rural District of Qeshlaq Dasht District in Bileh Savar County, Ardabil province, Iran.

== Demographics ==
=== Population ===
At the time of the 2006 National Census, the village's population was 171 in 41 households. The following census in 2011 counted 151 people in 38 households. The 2016 census measured the population of the village as 127 people in 29 households.
