= Qeshlaq-e Hajj Khan Hoseyn Samid =

Village in Ardabil province, Iran

Qeshlaq-e Hajj Khan Hoseyn Samid Persian: قشلاق حاج خان حسين صميد
- Village
- Country: Iran
- Province: Ardabil
- County: Bileh Savar
- District: Qeshlaq Dasht
- Rural District: Qeshlaq-e Sharqi

Population (2016)
  - Total: 12
- Time zone: UTC+3:30 (IRST)

Qeshlaq-e Hajj Khan Hoseyn Samid (Persian: قشلاق حاج خان حسين صميد) (Note: Also romanized as Qeshlāq-e Ḩājj Khān Ḩoseyn Şamīd) is a village in Qeshlaq-e Sharqi Rural District of Qeshlaq Dasht District in Bileh Savar County, Ardabil province, Iran.

== Demographics ==
=== Population ===
At the time of the 2006 National Census, the village's population was 29 in eight households. The following census in 2011 counted 21 people in five households. The 2016 census measured the population of the village as 12 people in four households.
