= Qeshlaq-e Khan Hoseyn Vadelan =

Qeshlaq-e Khan Hoseyn Vadelan (Persian: قشلاق خان حسين ودلان) may refer to:

- Qeshlaq-e Khan Hoseyn Vadelan Hajj Mohammad Taqi
- Qeshlaq-e Khan Hoseyn Vadelan Teymur
