= Qeshlaq-e Hajj Shirin Mosib =

Village in Ardabil province, Iran

Qeshlaq-e Hajj Shirin Mosib Persian: قشلاق حاج شيرين مصيب
- Village
- Country: Iran
- Province: Ardabil
- County: Bileh Savar
- District: Qeshlaq Dasht
- Rural District: Qeshlaq-e Sharqi

Population (2016)
  - Total: 97
- Time zone: UTC+3:30 (IRST)

Qeshlaq-e Hajj Shirin Mosib (Persian: قشلاق حاج شيرين مصيب) (Note: Also romanized as Qeshlāq-e Ḩājj Shīrīn Moṣīb) is a village in Qeshlaq-e Sharqi Rural District of Qeshlaq Dasht District in Bileh Savar County, Ardabil province, Iran.

== Demographics ==
=== Population ===
At the time of the 2006 National Census, the village's population was 152 in 33 households. The following census in 2011 counted 100 people in 27 households. The 2016 census measured the population of the village as 97 people in 28 households.
