= Qeshlaq-e Hajj Dalan Khan Hoseyn Khodayar =

Village in Ardabil province, Iran

Qeshlaq-e Hajj Dalan Khan Hoseyn Khodayar Persian: قشلاق حاج دلان خان حسين خدايار
- Village
- Country: Iran
- Province: Ardabil
- County: Bileh Savar
- District: Qeshlaq Dasht
- Rural District: Qeshlaq-e Sharqi

Population (2016)
  - Total: 32
- Time zone: UTC+3:30 (IRST)

Qeshlaq-e Hajj Dalan Khan Hoseyn Khodayar (Persian: قشلاق حاج دلان خان حسين خدايار) (Note: Also romanized as Qeshlāq-e Ḩājj Dalān Khān Ḩoseyn Khodāyār) is a village in Qeshlaq-e Sharqi Rural District of Qeshlaq Dasht District in Bileh Savar County, Ardabil province, Iran.

== Demographics ==
=== Population ===
At the time of the 2006 National Census, the village's population was 67 in 13 households. The following census in 2011 counted 30 people in eight households. The 2016 census measured the population of the village as 32 people in 10 households.
