= Qeshlaq-e Safar =

Qeshlaq-e Safar (Persian: قشلاق صفر) may refer to:

- Qeshlaq-e Safar Ali Ghib Ali
- Qeshlaq-e Safar Ali Nosrat
