= Ali Khan Kandi =

Village in Ardabil province, Iran

Ali Khan Kandi Persian: عليخان كندي
- Village
- Country: Iran
- Province: Ardabil
- County: Bileh Savar
- District: Qeshlaq Dasht
- Rural District: Qeshlaq-e Sharqi

Population (2016)
  - Total: 48
- Time zone: UTC+3:30 (IRST)

Ali Khan Kandi (Persian: عليخان كندي) (Note: Also romanized as ʿAlī Khān Kandī) is a village in Qeshlaq-e Sharqi Rural District of Qeshlaq Dasht District in Bileh Savar County, Ardabil province, Iran.

== Demographics ==
=== Population ===
At the time of the 2006 National Census, the village's population was 46 in 10 households. The following census in 2011 counted 48 people in 12 households. The 2016 census measured the population of the village as 48 people in 19 households.
