= Qeshlaq-e Hajj Soleyman-e Ali Goshad Teymuri =

Village in Ardabil province, Iran

Qeshlaq-e Hajj Soleyman-e Ali Goshad Teymuri Persian: قشلاق حاج سليمان علي گشادتيموري
- Village
- Location within Iran
- Coordinates: 39°26′50″N 48°03′03″E
- Country: Iran
- Province: Ardabil
- County: Bileh Savar
- District: Qeshlaq Dasht
- Rural District: Qeshlaq-e Sharqi

Population (2016)
  - Total: 56
- Time zone: UTC+3:30 (IRST)

Qeshlaq-e Hajj Soleyman-e Ali Goshad Teymuri (Persian: قشلاق حاج سليمان علي گشادتيموري) (Note: Also romanized as Qeshlāq-e Ḩājj Soleymān-e ‘Alī Goshād Teymūrī; also known as Qeshlāq-e Soleymān-e ‘Alī Goshād) is a village in Qeshlaq-e Sharqi Rural District of Qeshlaq Dasht District in Bileh Savar County, Ardabil province, Iran.

== Demographics ==
=== Population ===
At the time of the 2006 National Census, the village's population was 43 in 10 households. The following census in 2011 counted 73 people in 16 households. The 2016 census measured the population of the village as 56 people in 15 households.
