= Qeshlaq-e Mira Alam =

Village in Ardabil province, Iran

Qeshlaq-e Mira Alam Persian: قشلاق ميراعلم
- Village
- Country: Iran
- Province: Ardabil
- County: Bileh Savar
- District: Qeshlaq Dasht
- Rural District: Qeshlaq-e Sharqi

Population (2016)
  - Total: Below reporting threshold
- Time zone: UTC+3:30 (IRST)

Qeshlaq-e Mira Alam (Persian: قشلاق ميراعلم) (Note: Also romanized as Qeshlāq-e Mīrā ʿAlam) is a village in Qeshlaq-e Sharqi Rural District of Qeshlaq Dasht District in Bileh Savar County, Ardabil province, Iran.

== Demographics ==
=== Population ===
At the time of the 2006 National Census, the village's population was 33 in eight households. The following census in 2011 counted 13 people in five households. The 2016 census measured the population of the village as below the reporting threshold.
