= Qeshlaq-e Hajj Heydar Gol Ahmad =

Village in Ardabil province, Iran

Qeshlaq-e Hajj Heydar Gol Ahmad Persian: قشلاق حاج حيدرگل احمد
- Village
- Country: Iran
- Province: Ardabil
- County: Bileh Savar
- District: Qeshlaq Dasht
- Rural District: Qeshlaq-e Sharqi

Population (2016)
  - Total: 196
- Time zone: UTC+3:30 (IRST)

Qeshlaq-e Hajj Heydar Gol Ahmad (Persian: قشلاق حاج حيدرگل احمد) (Note: Also romanized as Qeshlāq-e Ḩājj Ḩeydar Gol Aḩmad) is a village in Qeshlaq-e Sharqi Rural District of Qeshlaq Dasht District in Bileh Savar County, Ardabil province, Iran.

== Demographics ==
=== Population ===
At the time of the 2006 National Census, the village's population was 184 in 39 households. The following census in 2011 counted 168 people in 48 households. The 2016 census measured the population of the village as 196 people in 56 households.
