= Qeshlaq-e Ali Karimi =

Village in Ardabil province, Iran

Qeshlaq-e Ali Karimi Persian: قشلاق الي كريمي
- Village
- Country: Iran
- Province: Ardabil
- County: Bileh Savar
- District: Qeshlaq Dasht
- Rural District: Qeshlaq-e Sharqi

Population (2016)
  - Total: 113
- Time zone: UTC+3:30 (IRST)

Qeshlaq-e Ali Karimi (Persian: قشلاق الي كريمي) (Note: Also romanized as Qeshlāq-e Alī Karīmī) is a village in Qeshlaq-e Sharqi Rural District of Qeshlaq Dasht District in Bileh Savar County, Ardabil province, Iran.

== Demographics ==
=== Population ===
At the time of the 2006 National Census, the village's population was 138 in 34 households. The following census in 2011 counted 134 people in 35 households. The 2016 census measured the population of the village as 113 people in 33 households.
