= Qeshlaq-e Arablu Asrafil =

Village in Ardabil province, Iran

Qeshlaq-e Arablu Asrafil Persian: قشلاق عربلواسرافيل
- Village
- Country: Iran
- Province: Ardabil
- County: Bileh Savar
- District: Qeshlaq Dasht
- Rural District: Qeshlaq-e Sharqi

Population (2016)
  - Total: 40
- Time zone: UTC+3:30 (IRST)

Qeshlaq-e Arablu Asrafil (Persian: قشلاق عربلواسرافيل) (Note: Also romanized as Qeshlāq-e ʿArablū Āsrāfīl) is a village in Qeshlaq-e Sharqi Rural District of Qeshlaq Dasht District in Bileh Savar County, Ardabil province, Iran.

== Demographics ==
=== Population ===
At the time of the 2006 National Census, the village's population was 60 in 15 households. The following census in 2011 counted 49 people in 12 households. The 2016 census measured the population of the village as 40 people in 10 households.
