= Qeshlaq-e Esmail Khan =

Qeshlaq-e Esmail Khan (Persian: قشلاق اسماعل خان) may refer to:

- Qeshlaq-e Esmail Khan, Parsabad
- Qeshlaq-e Esmail Khan Jalil Ranjaber, Bileh Savar County
- Qeshlaq-e Esmail Khan Mohammad Izadi, Bileh Savar County
