= Khan Baba Kandi =

Village in Ardabil province, Iran

Khan Baba Kandi Persian: خان باباكندي
- Village
- Location within Iran
- Coordinates: 39°23′57″N 48°10′42″E
- Country: Iran
- Province: Ardabil
- County: Bileh Savar
- District: Qeshlaq Dasht
- Rural District: Qeshlaq-e Sharqi

Population (2016)
  - Total: 871
- Time zone: UTC+3:30 (IRST)

Khan Baba Kandi (Persian: خان باباكندي) (Note: Also romanized as Khān Bābā Kandī) is a village in Qeshlaq-e Sharqi Rural District of Qeshlaq Dasht District in Bileh Savar County, Ardabil province, Iran.

== Demographics ==
=== Population ===
At the time of the 2006 National Census, the village's population was 905 in 181 households. The following census in 2011 counted 862 people in 225 households. The 2016 census measured the population of the village as 871 people in 260 households.
