= Qeshlaq-e Padar Eys Khan =

Village in Ardabil province, Iran

Qeshlaq-e Padar Eys Khan Persian: قشلاق پادارعيس خان
- Village
- Location within Iran
- Coordinates: 39°28′36″N 47°52′28″E
- Country: Iran
- Province: Ardabil
- County: Bileh Savar
- District: Qeshlaq Dasht
- Rural District: Qeshlaq-e Sharqi

Population (2016)
  - Total: Below reporting threshold
- Time zone: UTC+3:30 (IRST)

Qeshlaq-e Padar Eys Khan (Persian: قشلاق پادارعيس خان) (Note: Also romanized as Qeshlāq-e Pādār ʿEys Khān) is a village in Qeshlaq-e Sharqi Rural District of Qeshlaq Dasht District in Bileh Savar County, Ardabil province, Iran.

== Demographics ==
=== Population ===
At the time of the 2006 National Census, the village's population was 16 in four households. The village did not appear in the following census of 2011. The 2016 census measured the population of the village as below the reporting threshold.
