= Chalmeh Kandi =

Village in Ardabil province, Iran

Chalmeh Kandi Persian: چالمه كندي
- Village
- Location within Iran
- Coordinates: 39°24′44″N 48°06′11″E
- Country: Iran
- Province: Ardabil
- County: Bileh Savar
- District: Qeshlaq Dasht
- Rural District: Qeshlaq-e Sharqi

Population (2016)
  - Total: 752
- Time zone: UTC+3:30 (IRST)

Chalmeh Kandi (Persian: چالمه كندي) (Note: Also romanized as Chālmeh Kandī; also known as Chalmā, Chalmā Kandī, Chalmā Kendī, and Chālmeh) is a village in Qeshlaq-e Sharqi Rural District of Qeshlaq Dasht District in Bileh Savar County, Ardabil province, Iran.

== Demographics ==
=== Population ===
At the time of the 2006 National Census, the village's population was 734 in 140 households. The following census in 2011 counted 752 people in 209 households. The 2016 census measured the population of the village as 752 people in 203 households.
