= Qeshlaq-e Hajji Heydar Havar =

Village in Ardabil province, Iran

Qeshlaq-e Hajji Heydar Havar Persian: قشلاق حاجي حيدرهاوار
- Village
- Location within Iran
- Coordinates: 39°27′33″N 48°09′38″E
- Country: Iran
- Province: Ardabil
- County: Bileh Savar
- District: Qeshlaq Dasht
- Rural District: Qeshlaq-e Sharqi

Population (2016)
  - Total: Below reporting threshold
- Time zone: UTC+3:30 (IRST)

Qeshlaq-e Hajji Heydar Havar (Persian: قشلاق حاجي حيدرهاوار) (Note: Also romanized as Qeshlāq-e Ḩājjī Ḩeydar Hāvār) is a village in Qeshlaq-e Sharqi Rural District of Qeshlaq Dasht District in Bileh Savar County, Ardabil province, Iran.

== Demographics ==
=== Population ===
At the time of the 2006 National Census, the village's population was 21 in six households. The following census in 2011 counted 18 people in five households. The 2016 census measured the population of the village as below the reporting threshold.
