= Qeshlaq-e Babash =

Qeshlaq-e Babash (Persian: قشلاق باباش) may refer to:

- Qeshlaq-e Babash-e Olya
- Qeshlaq-e Babash-e Sofla
