= Owch Darreh-ye Moghanlu Ogham Ali =

Village in Ardabil province, Iran

Owch Darreh-ye Moghanlu Ogham Ali Persian: اوچ دره مغانلواغامعلي
- Village
- Location within Iran
- Coordinates: 39°22′58″N 47°52′15″E
- Country: Iran
- Province: Ardabil
- County: Bileh Savar
- District: Qeshlaq Dasht
- Rural District: Qeshlaq-e Sharqi

Population (2016)
  - Total: 103
- Time zone: UTC+3:30 (IRST)

Owch Darreh-ye Moghanlu Ogham Ali (Persian: اوچ دره مغانلواغامعلي) (Note: Also romanized as Owch Darreh-ye Moghānlū Oghām ʿAlī; also known as Owch Darreh, Qeshlāq-e Pākdel, and Ūch Daraq-e ‘Olyā) is a village in Qeshlaq-e Sharqi Rural District of Qeshlaq Dasht District in Bileh Savar County, Ardabil province, Iran.

== Demographics ==
=== Population ===
At the time of the 2006 National Census, the village's population was 144 in 26 households. The following census in 2011 counted 67 people in 13 households. The 2016 census measured the population of the village as 103 people in 28 households.
