= Mayeh Darrehsi =

Village in Ardabil province, Iran

Mayeh Darrehsi Persian: مايه دره سي
- Village
- Location within Iran
- Coordinates: 39°25′32″N 48°02′45″E
- Country: Iran
- Province: Ardabil
- County: Bileh Savar
- District: Qeshlaq Dasht
- Rural District: Qeshlaq-e Sharqi

Population (2016)
  - Total: 46
- Time zone: UTC+3:30 (IRST)

Mayeh Darrehsi (Persian: مايه دره سي) (Note: Also romanized as Mayeh Darrahsi and Māyeh Darrahsī) is a village in Qeshlaq-e Sharqi Rural District of Qeshlaq Dasht District in Bileh Savar County, Ardabil province, Iran.

== Demographics ==
=== Population ===
At the time of the 2006 National Census, the village's population was 50 in eight households. The following census in 2011 counted 36 people in 10 households. The 2016 census measured the population of the village as 46 people in 12 households.
