= Qeshlaq-e Galam Ali Hajj Savad =

Village in Ardabil province, Iran

Qeshlaq-e Galam Ali Hajj Savad Persian: قشلاق گلمعلي حاج سواد
- Village
- Location within Iran
- Coordinates: 39°26′59″N 47°46′02″E
- Country: Iran
- Province: Ardabil
- County: Bileh Savar
- District: Qeshlaq Dasht
- Rural District: Qeshlaq-e Sharqi

Population (2016)
  - Total: Below reporting threshold
- Time zone: UTC+3:30 (IRST)

Qeshlaq-e Galam Ali Hajj Savad (Persian: قشلاق گلمعلي حاج سواد) (Note: Also romanized as Qeshlāq-e Galam ʿAlī Ḩājj Savād) is a village in Qeshlaq-e Sharqi Rural District of Qeshlaq Dasht District in Bileh Savar County, Ardabil province, Iran.

== Demographics ==
=== Population ===
At the time of the 2006 National Census, the village's population was 29 in eight households. The following census in 2011 counted 14 people in four households. The 2016 census measured the population of the village as below the reporting threshold.
