= Qeshlaq-e Qarah Darreh-ye Kahel va Qeshlaq-e Hajji Shahverdi =

Village in Ardabil province, Iran

Qeshlaq-e Qarah Darreh-ye Kahel va Qeshlaq-e Hajji Shahverdi Persian: قشلاق قره دره كهلوقشلاق حاجي شاهوردي
- Village
- Country: Iran
- Province: Ardabil
- County: Bileh Savar
- District: Qeshlaq Dasht
- Rural District: Qeshlaq-e Sharqi

Population (2016)
  - Total: 29
- Time zone: UTC+3:30 (IRST)

Qeshlaq-e Qarah Darreh-ye Kahel va Qeshlaq-e Hajji Shahverdi (Persian: قشلاق قره دره كهلوقشلاق حاجي شاهوردي) (Note: Also romanized as Qeshlāq-e Qarah Darreh-ye Kahel va Qeshlāq-e Ḩājjī Shāhverdī) is a village in Qeshlaq-e Sharqi Rural District of Qeshlaq Dasht District in Bileh Savar County, Ardabil province, Iran.

== Demographics ==
=== Population ===
At the time of the 2006 National Census, the village's population was 113 in 29 households. The following census in 2011 counted 11 people in four households. The 2016 census measured the population of the village as 18 people in five households.
