= Qeshlaq-e Molla Naqi Qanbar =

Village in Ardabil province, Iran

Qeshlaq-e Molla Naqi Qanbar Persian: قشلاق ملانقي قنبر
- Village
- Country: Iran
- Province: Ardabil
- County: Bileh Savar
- District: Qeshlaq Dasht
- Rural District: Qeshlaq-e Sharqi

Population (2016)
  - Total: 304
- Time zone: UTC+3:30 (IRST)

Qeshlaq-e Molla Naqi Qanbar (Persian: قشلاق ملانقي قنبر) (Note: Also romanized as Qeshlāq-e Mollā Naqī Qanbar) is a village in Qeshlaq-e Sharqi Rural District of Qeshlaq Dasht District in Bileh Savar County, Ardabil province, Iran.

== Demographics ==
=== Population ===
At the time of the 2006 National Census, the village's population was 308 in 60 households. The following census in 2011 counted 241 people in 63 households. The 2016 census measured the population of the village as 304 people in 86 households.
