= Qeshlaq-e Qarah Darreh-ye Aziz Rostam =

Village in Ardabil province, Iran

Qeshlaq-e Qarah Darreh-ye Aziz Rostam Persian: قشلاق قره دره عزيزرستم
- Village
- Country: Iran
- Province: Ardabil
- County: Bileh Savar
- District: Qeshlaq Dasht
- Rural District: Qeshlaq-e Sharqi

Population (2016)
  - Total: 31
- Time zone: UTC+3:30 (IRST)

Qeshlaq-e Qarah Darreh-ye Aziz Rostam (Persian: قشلاق قره دره عزيزرستم) (Note: Also romanized as Qeshlāq-e Qarah Darreh-ye ʿAzīz Rostam) is a village in Qeshlaq-e Sharqi Rural District of Qeshlaq Dasht District in Bileh Savar County, Ardabil province, Iran.

== Demographics ==
=== Population ===
At the time of the 2006 National Census, the village's population was 96 in 16 households. The following census in 2011 counted 29 people in eight households. The 2016 census measured the population of the village as 31 people in 10 households.
