= Qeshlaq-e Beyg Ali-ye Sofla =

Village in Ardabil province, Iran

Qeshlaq-e Beyg Ali-ye Sofla Persian: قشلاق بيگ علي سفلي
- Village
- Location within Iran
- Coordinates: 39°24′44″N 48°00′26″E
- Country: Iran
- Province: Ardabil
- County: Bileh Savar
- District: Qeshlaq Dasht
- Rural District: Qeshlaq-e Sharqi

Population (2016)
  - Total: 78
- Time zone: UTC+3:30 (IRST)

Qeshlaq-e Beyg Ali-ye Sofla (Persian: قشلاق بيگ علي سفلي) (Note: Also romanized as Qeshlāq-e Beyg ʿAlī-ye Soflá) is a village in Qeshlaq-e Sharqi Rural District of Qeshlaq Dasht District in Bileh Savar County, Ardabil province, Iran.

== Demographics ==
=== Population ===
At the time of the 2006 National Census, the village's population was 52 in nine households. The following census in 2011 counted 125 people in 30 households. The 2016 census measured the population of the village as 78 people in 20 households.
