= Qeshlaq-e Nariman Kandi Hajj Khan Owghlan =

Village in Ardabil province, Iran

Qeshlaq-e Nariman Kandi Hajj Khan Owghlan Persian: قشلاق نريمان كندئ حاج خان اوغلان
- Village
- Location within Iran
- Coordinates: 39°24′32″N 48°01′22″E
- Country: Iran
- Province: Ardabil
- County: Bileh Savar
- District: Qeshlaq Dasht
- Rural District: Qeshlaq-e Sharqi

Population (2016)
  - Total: 14
- Time zone: UTC+3:30 (IRST)

Qeshlaq-e Nariman Kandi Hajj Khan Owghlan (Persian: قشلاق نريمان كندئ حاج خان اوغلان) (Note: Also romanized as Qeshlāq-e Narīmān Kandī Ḩājj Khān Owghlān; also known as Qeshlāq-e Narīmān and Qeshlāq-e Narīmān-e Khān Ūghlān) is a village in Qeshlaq-e Sharqi Rural District of Qeshlaq Dasht District in Bileh Savar County, Ardabil province, Iran.

== Demographics ==
=== Population ===
At the time of the 2006 National Census, the village's population was 32 in nine households. The following census in 2011 counted 27 people in eight households. The 2016 census measured the population of the village as 14 people in five households.
