= Qeshlaq-e Qarah Jalu Hajji Iman =

Village in Ardabil province, Iran

Qeshlaq-e Qarah Jalu Hajji Iman Persian: قشلاق قره جالوحاجي ايمان
- Village
- Location within Iran
- Country: Iran
- Province: Ardabil
- County: Bileh Savar
- District: Qeshlaq Dasht
- Rural District: Qeshlaq-e Sharqi

Population (2016)
  - Total: 70
- Time zone: UTC+3:30 (IRST)

Qeshlaq-e Qarah Jalu Hajji Iman (Persian: قشلاق قره جالوحاجي ايمان) (Note: Also romanized as Qeshlāq-e Qarah Jālū Ḩājjī Īmān) is a village in Qeshlaq-e Sharqi Rural District of Qeshlaq Dasht District in Bileh Savar County, Ardabil province, Iran.

== Demographics ==
=== Population ===
At the time of the 2006 National Census, the village's population was 145 in 38 households. The following census in 2011 counted 114 people in 31 households. The 2016 census measured the population of the village as 70 people in 18 households.
