= Qeshlaq-e Padarjamal =

Village in Ardabil province, Iran

Qeshlaq-e Padarjamal Persian: قشلاق پادارجمال
- Village
- Location within Iran
- Coordinates: 39°28′53″N 47°52′04″E
- Country: Iran
- Province: Ardabil
- County: Bileh Savar
- District: Qeshlaq Dasht
- Rural District: Qeshlaq-e Sharqi

Population (2016)
  - Total: 66
- Time zone: UTC+3:30 (IRST)

Qeshlaq-e Padarjamal (Persian: قشلاق پادارجمال) (Note: Also romanized as Qeshlāq-e Pādārjamāl) is a village in Qeshlaq-e Sharqi Rural District of Qeshlaq Dasht District in Bileh Savar County, Ardabil province, Iran.

== Demographics ==
=== Population ===
At the time of the 2006 National Census, the village's population was 68 in 13 households. The following census in 2011 counted 47 people in 15 households. The 2016 census measured the population of the village as 66 people in 20 households.
