= Qeshlaq-e Qarah Darreh-ye Hajji Alish =

Village in Ardabil province, Iran

Qeshlaq-e Qarah Darreh-ye Hajji Alish Persian: قشلاق قره دره حاجي عليش
- Village
- Location within Iran
- Coordinates: 39°27′56″N 47°59′45″E
- Country: Iran
- Province: Ardabil
- County: Bileh Savar
- District: Qeshlaq Dasht
- Rural District: Qeshlaq-e Sharqi

Population (2016)
  - Total: 33
- Time zone: UTC+3:30 (IRST)

Qeshlaq-e Qarah Darreh-ye Hajji Alish (Persian: قشلاق قره دره حاجي عليش) (Note: Also romanized as Qeshlāq-e Qarah Darreh-ye Ḩājjī ʿAlīsh) is a village in Qeshlaq-e Sharqi Rural District of Qeshlaq Dasht District in Bileh Savar County, Ardabil province, Iran.

== Demographics ==
=== Population ===
At the time of the 2006 National Census, the village's population was 54 in 13 households. The following census in 2011 counted 26 people in eight households. The 2016 census measured the population of the village as 33 people in 11 households.
