= Qeshlaq-e Hajj Abish Hajj Mosum =

Village in Ardabil province, Iran

Qeshlaq-e Hajj Abish Hajj Mosum Persian: قشلاق حاج ابيش حاج معصوم
- Village
- Location within Iran
- Coordinates: 39°28′02″N 47°54′01″E
- Country: Iran
- Province: Ardabil
- County: Bileh Savar
- District: Qeshlaq Dasht
- Rural District: Qeshlaq-e Sharqi

Population (2016)
  - Total: 72
- Time zone: UTC+3:30 (IRST)

Qeshlaq-e Hajj Abish Hajj Mosum (Persian: قشلاق حاج ابيش حاج معصوم) (Note: Also romanized as Qeshlāq-e Ḩājj Ābīsh Ḩājj Moʿṣūm) is a village in Qeshlaq-e Sharqi Rural District of Qeshlaq Dasht District in Bileh Savar County, Ardabil province, Iran.

== Demographics ==
=== Population ===
At the time of the 2006 National Census, the village's population was 51 in 11 households. The following census in 2011 counted 74 people in 20 households. The 2016 census measured the population of the village as 72 people in 17 households.
