= Qusha Qeshlaq-e Mansur va Rahman =

Village in Ardabil province, Iran

Qusha Qeshlaq-e Mansur va Rahman Persian: قوشاقشلاق منصورورحمان
- Village
- Location within Iran
- Coordinates: 39°21′50″N 47°43′16″E
- Country: Iran
- Province: Ardabil
- County: Bileh Savar
- District: Qeshlaq Dasht
- Rural District: Qeshlaq-e Sharqi

Population (2016)
  - Total: 134
- Time zone: UTC+3:30 (IRST)

Qusha Qeshlaq-e Mansur va Rahman (Persian: قوشاقشلاق منصورورحمان) (Note: Also romanized as Qūshā Qeshlāq-e Manṣūr va Raḥmān) is a village in Qeshlaq-e Sharqi Rural District of Qeshlaq Dasht District in Bileh Savar County, Ardabil province, Iran.

== Demographics ==
=== Population ===
At the time of the 2006 National Census, the village's population was 130 in 23 households. The following census in 2011 counted 136 people in 34 households. The 2016 census measured the population of the village as 134 people in 45 households.
