= Qeshlaq-e Bakhtiar =

Qeshlaq-e Bakhtiar (Persian: قشلاق بختيار) may refer to:

- Qeshlaq-e Bakhtiar, Ardabil
- Qeshlaq-e Bakhtiar, West Azerbaijan
