= Qeshlaq-e Owch Quyi Hajj Hasan Shayiqi =

Village in Ardabil province, Iran

Qeshlaq-e Owch Quyi Hajj Hasan Shayiqi Persian: قشلاق اوچ قوي حاج حسن شايقي
- Village
- Country: Iran
- Province: Ardabil
- County: Bileh Savar
- District: Qeshlaq Dasht
- Rural District: Qeshlaq-e Sharqi

Population (2016)
  - Total: 43
- Time zone: UTC+3:30 (IRST)

Qeshlaq-e Owch Quyi Hajj Hasan Shayiqi (Persian: قشلاق اوچ قوي حاج حسن شايقي) (Note: Also romanized as Qeshlāq-e Owch Qūyī Ḩājj Ḩasan Shāyīqī) is a village in Qeshlaq-e Sharqi Rural District of Qeshlaq Dasht District in Bileh Savar County, Ardabil province, Iran.

== Demographics ==
=== Population ===
At the time of the 2006 National Census, the village's population was 117 in 22 households. The following census in 2011 counted 54 people in 16 households. The 2016 census measured the population of the village as 43 people in 14 households.
