= Qeshlaq-e Hajji Abish Hajj Rahim =

Village in Ardabil province, Iran

Qeshlaq-e Hajji Abish Hajj Rahim Persian: قشلاق حاجي ابيش حاج رحيم
- Village
- Location within Iran
- Coordinates: 39°28′01″N 47°54′35″E
- Country: Iran
- Province: Ardabil
- County: Bileh Savar
- District: Qeshlaq Dasht
- Rural District: Qeshlaq-e Sharqi

Population (2016)
  - Total: 56
- Time zone: UTC+3:30 (IRST)

Qeshlaq-e Hajji Abish Hajj Rahim (Persian: قشلاق حاجي ابيش حاج رحيم) (Note: Also romanized as Qeshlāq-e Ḩājjī Ābīsh Ḩājj Raḥīm) is a village in Qeshlaq-e Sharqi Rural District of Qeshlaq Dasht District in Bileh Savar County, Ardabil province, Iran.

== Demographics ==
=== Population ===
At the time of the 2006 National Census, the village's population was 27 in five households. The following census in 2011 counted 50 people in 15 households. The 2016 census measured the population of the village as 56 people in 16 households.
