= Hajji Baba Khan, Ardabil =

Village in Ardabil province, Iran

Hajji Baba Khan Persian: حاجي باباخان
- Village
- Location within Iran
- Coordinates: 39°23′13″N 48°06′33″E
- Country: Iran
- Province: Ardabil
- County: Bileh Savar
- District: Qeshlaq Dasht
- Rural District: Qeshlaq-e Sharqi

Population (2016)
  - Total: 76
- Time zone: UTC+3:30 (IRST)

Hajji Baba Khan (Persian: حاجي باباخان) (Note: Also romanized as Ḩājjī Bābā Khān; also known as Ḩāj Bābākhān and Ḩājj Bābā Khān) is a village in Qeshlaq-e Sharqi Rural District of Qeshlaq Dasht District in Bileh Savar County, Ardabil province, Iran.

== Demographics ==
=== Population ===
At the time of the 2006 National Census, the village's population was 42 in 10 households. The following census in 2011 counted 36 people in eight households. The 2016 census measured the population of the village as 76 people in 23 households.
