= Qeshlaq-e Owch Darreh Savad =

Village in Ardabil province, Iran

Qeshlaq-e Owch Darreh Savad Persian: قشلاق اوچ دره سواد
- Village
- Location within Iran
- Coordinates: 39°24′10″N 47°51′44″E
- Country: Iran
- Province: Ardabil
- County: Bileh Savar
- District: Qeshlaq Dasht
- Rural District: Qeshlaq-e Sharqi

Population (2016)
  - Total: 27
- Time zone: UTC+3:30 (IRST)

Qeshlaq-e Owch Ali Savad (Persian: قشلاق اوچ دره سواد) (Note: Also romanized as Qeshlāq-e Owch Darreh Savād) is a village in Qeshlaq-e Sharqi Rural District of Qeshlaq Dasht District in Bileh Savar County, Ardabil province, Iran.

== Demographics ==
=== Population ===
At the time of the 2006 National Census, the village's population was 28 in five households. The following census in 2011 counted 19 people in five households. The 2016 census measured the population of the village as 27 people in seven households.
