= Qeshlaq-e Baqersoli Ali Sahami =

Village in Ardabil province, Iran

Qeshlaq-e Baqersoli Ali Sahami Persian: قشلاق باقرسلي علي سهامي
- Village
- Country: Iran
- Province: Ardabil
- County: Bileh Savar
- District: Qeshlaq Dasht
- Rural District: Qeshlaq-e Sharqi

Population (2016)
  - Total: 24
- Time zone: UTC+3:30 (IRST)

Qeshlaq-e Baqersoli Ali Sahami (Persian: قشلاق باقرسلي علي سهامي) (Note: Also romanized as Qeshlāq-e Bāqersolī ʿAlī Sahāmī; also known as Allah Verdī (الله وردي)) is a village in Qeshlaq-e Sharqi Rural District of Qeshlaq Dasht District in Bileh Savar County, Ardabil province, Iran.

== Demographics ==
=== Population ===
At the time of the 2006 National Census, the village's population was 27 in six households. The following census in 2011 counted 20 people in four households. The 2016 census measured the population of the village as 24 people in eight households.
