= Qeshlaq-e Babash-e Olya =

Village in Ardabil province, Iran

Qeshlaq-e Babash-e Olya Persian: قشلاق باباش عليا
- Village
- Country: Iran
- Province: Ardabil
- County: Bileh Savar
- District: Qeshlaq Dasht
- Rural District: Qeshlaq-e Sharqi

Population (2016)
  - Total: 102
- Time zone: UTC+3:30 (IRST)

Qeshlaq-e Babash-e Olya (Persian: قشلاق باباش عليا) (Note: Also romanized as Qeshlāq-e Bābāsh-e ‘Olyā) is a village in Qeshlaq-e Sharqi Rural District of Qeshlaq Dasht District in Bileh Savar County, Ardabil province, Iran.

== Demographics ==
=== Population ===
At the time of the 2006 National Census, the village's population was 108 in 23 households. The following census in 2011 counted 96 people in 31 households. The 2016 census measured the population of the village as 102 people in 34 households.
