= Qeshlaq Aghdash-e Beyglar =

Village in Ardabil province, Iran

Qeshlaq Aghdash-e Beyglar Persian: قشلاق اغداش بيگلر
- Village
- Location within Iran
- Coordinates: 39°27′54″N 47°50′22″E
- Country: Iran
- Province: Ardabil
- County: Bileh Savar
- District: Qeshlaq Dasht
- Rural District: Qeshlaq-e Sharqi

Population (2016)
  - Total: 83
- Time zone: UTC+3:30 (IRST)

Qeshlaq Aghdash-e Beyglar (Persian: قشلاق اغداش بيگلر) (Note: Also romanized as Qeshlāq-e Āghdāsh-e Beyglar) is a village in Qeshlaq-e Sharqi Rural District of Qeshlaq Dasht District in Bileh Savar County, Ardabil province, Iran.

== Demographics ==
=== Population ===
At the time of the 2006 National Census, the village's population was 48 in 10 households. The following census in 2011 counted 20 people in four households. The 2016 census measured the population of the village as 83 people in 25 households.
