= Qeshlaq-e Shah Khanem Qadir =

Village in Ardabil province, Iran

Qeshlaq-e Shah Khanem Qadir Persian: قشلاق شاه خانم قدير
- Village
- Location within Iran
- Coordinates: 39°24′01″N 47°45′22″E
- Country: Iran
- Province: Ardabil
- County: Bileh Savar
- District: Qeshlaq Dasht
- Rural District: Qeshlaq-e Sharqi

Population (2016)
  - Total: 24
- Time zone: UTC+3:30 (IRST)

Qeshlaq-e Shah Khanem Qadir (Persian: قشلاق شاه خانم قدير) (Note: Also romanized as Qeshlāq-e Shāh Khānem Qadīr) is a village in Qeshlaq-e Sharqi Rural District of Qeshlaq Dasht District in Bileh Savar County, Ardabil province, Iran.

== Demographics ==
=== Population ===
At the time of the 2006 National Census, the village's population was 48 in 11 households. The following census in 2011 counted 56 people in 15 households. The 2016 census measured the population of the village as 24 people in seven households.
