= Qeshlaq-e Bakhtiar, Ardabil =

Village in Ardabil province, Iran

Qeshlaq-e Bakhtiar Persian: قشلاق بختيار
- Village
- Location within Iran
- Coordinates: 39°28′23″N 48°01′29″E
- Country: Iran
- Province: Ardabil
- County: Bileh Savar
- District: Qeshlaq Dasht
- Rural District: Qeshlaq-e Sharqi

Population (2016)
  - Total: 63
- Time zone: UTC+3:30 (IRST)

Qeshlaq-e Bakhtiar (Persian: قشلاق بختيار) (Note: Also romanized as Qeshlāq-e Bakhtīār) is a village in Qeshlaq-e Sharqi Rural District of Qeshlaq Dasht District in Bileh Savar County, Ardabil province, Iran.

== Demographics ==
=== Population ===
At the time of the 2006 National Census, the village's population was 124 in 31 households. The following census in 2011 counted 73 people in 23 households. The 2016 census measured the population of the village as 63 people in 21 households.
