= Qeshlaq-e Qarah Darreh-ye Asam Khan Asad =

Village in Ardabil province, Iran

Qeshlaq-e Qarah Darreh-ye Asam Khan Asad Persian: قشلاق قره دره اسم خان اسد
- Village
- Location within Iran
- Coordinates: 39°26′40″N 47°56′54″E
- Country: Iran
- Province: Ardabil
- County: Bileh Savar
- District: Qeshlaq Dasht
- Rural District: Qeshlaq-e Sharqi

Population (2016)
  - Total: 18
- Time zone: UTC+3:30 (IRST)

Qeshlaq-e Qarah Darreh-ye Asam Khan Asad (Persian: قشلاق قره دره اسم خان اسد) (Note: Also romanized as Qeshlāq-e Qarah Darreh-ye Āsam Khān Āsad) is a village in Qeshlaq-e Sharqi Rural District of Qeshlaq Dasht District in Bileh Savar County, Ardabil province, Iran.

== Demographics ==
=== Population ===
At the time of the 2006 National Census, the village's population was 14 in four households. The following census in 2011 counted 11 people in four households. The 2016 census measured the population of the village as 18 people in five households.
