= Qeshlaq-e Nariman Kandi Hajji Havar =

Village in Ardabil province, Iran

Qeshlaq-e Nariman Kandi Hajji Havar Persian: قشلاق نريمان كندي حاجي هاوار
- Village
- Location within Iran
- Coordinates: 39°24′56″N 48°02′43″E
- Country: Iran
- Province: Ardabil
- County: Bileh Savar
- District: Qeshlaq Dasht
- Rural District: Qeshlaq-e Sharqi

Population (2016)
  - Total: 0
- Time zone: UTC+3:30 (IRST)

Qeshlaq-e Nariman Kandi Hajji Havar (Persian: قشلاق نريمان كندي حاجي هاوار) (Note: Also romanized as Qeshlāq-e Narīmān Kandī Ḩājjī Hāvār) is a village in Qeshlaq-e Sharqi Rural District of Qeshlaq Dasht District in Bileh Savar County, Ardabil province, Iran.

== Demographics ==
=== Population ===
At the time of the 2006 National Census, the village's population was 40 in nine households. The following census in 2011 counted 31 people in 10 households. The 2016 census measured the population of the village as zero.
