= Qeshlaq-e Baqersoli Satar =

Village in Ardabil province, Iran

Qeshlaq-e Baqersoli Satar Persian: قشلاق باقرسلي ستار
- Village
- Country: Iran
- Province: Ardabil
- County: Bileh Savar
- District: Qeshlaq Dasht
- Rural District: Qeshlaq-e Sharqi

Population (2016)
  - Total: 57
- Time zone: UTC+3:30 (IRST)

Qeshlaq-e Baqersoli Satar (Persian: قشلاق باقرسلي ستار) (Note: Also romanized as Qeshlāq-e Bāqersolī Satār) is a village in Qeshlaq-e Sharqi Rural District of Qeshlaq Dasht District in Bileh Savar County, Ardabil province, Iran.

== Demographics ==
=== Population ===
At the time of the 2006 National Census, the village's population was 79 in 18 households. The following census in 2011 counted 10 people in four households. The 2016 census measured the population of the village as 57 people in 17 households.
