= Qeshlaq-e Galam Ali Hajj Hoseyn =

Village in Ardabil province, Iran

Qeshlaq-e Galam Ali Hajj Hoseyn Persian: قشلاق گلمعلي حاج حسين
- Village
- Location within Iran
- Country: Iran
- Province: Ardabil
- County: Bileh Savar
- District: Qeshlaq Dasht
- Rural District: Qeshlaq-e Sharqi

Population (2016)
  - Total: 55
- Time zone: UTC+3:30 (IRST)

Qeshlaq-e Galam Ali Hajj Hoseyn (Persian: قشلاق گلمعلي حاج حسين) (Note: Also romanized as Qeshlāq-e Galam ʿAlī Ḩājj Ḩoseyn) is a village in Qeshlaq-e Sharqi Rural District of Qeshlaq Dasht District in Bileh Savar County, Ardabil province, Iran.

== Demographics ==
=== Population ===
At the time of the 2006 National Census, the village's population was 47 in 10 households. The following census in 2011 counted 47 people in 11 households. The 2016 census measured the population of the village as 55 people in 14 households.
