= Qeshlaq-e Qarah Darreh-ye Asam Khan Azadkhan =

Village in Ardabil province, Iran

Qeshlaq-e Qarah Darreh-ye Asam Khan Azadkhan Persian: قشلاق قره دره اسم خان ازادخان
- Village
- Country: Iran
- Province: Ardabil
- County: Bileh Savar
- District: Qeshlaq Dasht
- Rural District: Qeshlaq-e Sharqi

Population (2016)
  - Total: Below reporting threshold
- Time zone: UTC+3:30 (IRST)

Qeshlaq-e Qarah Darreh-ye Asam Khan Azadkhan (Persian: قشلاق قره دره اسم خان ازادخان) (Note: Also romanized as Qeshlāq-e Qarah Darreh-ye Āsam Khān Azādkhān) is a village in Qeshlaq-e Sharqi Rural District of Qeshlaq Dasht District in Bileh Savar County, Ardabil province, Iran.

== Demographics ==
=== Population ===
At the time of the 2006 National Census, the village's population was 20 in four households. The following census in 2011 counted 22 people in seven households. The 2016 census measured the population of the village as below the reporting threshold.
