= Qeshlaq Aghdash-e Bahram =

Village in Ardabil province, Iran

Qeshlaq Aghdash-e Bahram Persian: قشلاق اغداش بهرام
- Village
- Location within Iran
- Coordinates: 39°27′31″N 47°50′34″E
- Country: Iran
- Province: Ardabil
- County: Bileh Savar
- District: Qeshlaq Dasht
- Rural District: Qeshlaq-e Sharqi

Population (2016)
  - Total: 44
- Time zone: UTC+3:30 (IRST)

Qeshlaq Aghdash-e Bahram (Persian: قشلاق اغداش بهرام) (Note: Also romanized as Qeshlāq-e Āghdāsh-e Bahrām) is a village in Qeshlaq-e Sharqi Rural District of Qeshlaq Dasht District in Bileh Savar County, Ardabil province, Iran.

== Demographics ==
=== Population ===
At the time of the 2006 National Census, the village's population was 40 in nine households. The following census in 2011 counted 19 people in six households. The 2016 census measured the population of the village as 44 people in 13 households.
