= Qeshlaq-e Beyg Ali-ye Vosta =

Village in Ardabil province, Iran

Qeshlaq-e Beyg Ali-ye Vosta Persian: قشلاق بيگ علي وسطي
- Village
- Location within Iran
- Coordinates: 39°24′29″N 48°00′01″E
- Country: Iran
- Province: Ardabil
- County: Bileh Savar
- District: Qeshlaq Dasht
- Rural District: Qeshlaq-e Sharqi

Population (2016)
  - Total: 36
- Time zone: UTC+3:30 (IRST)

Qeshlaq-e Beyg Ali-ye Vosta (Persian: قشلاق بيگ علي وسطي) (Note: Also romanized as Qeshlāq-e Beyg ʿAlī-ye Vosţá) is a village in Qeshlaq-e Sharqi Rural District of Qeshlaq Dasht District in Bileh Savar County, Ardabil province, Iran.

== Demographics ==
=== Population ===
At the time of the 2006 National Census, the village's population was 42 in seven households. The following census in 2011 counted 32 people in 10 households. The 2016 census measured the population of the village as 36 people in 10 households.
