= Qeshlaq-e Galam Ali Safar =

Village in Ardabil province, Iran

Qeshlaq-e Galam Ali Safar Persian: قشلاق گلمعلي صفر
- Village
- Location within Iran
- Country: Iran
- Province: Ardabil
- County: Bileh Savar
- District: Qeshlaq Dasht
- Rural District: Qeshlaq-e Sharqi

Population (2016)
  - Total: 65
- Time zone: UTC+3:30 (IRST)

Qeshlaq-e Galam Ali Safar (Persian: قشلاق گلمعلي صفر) (Note: Also romanized as Qeshlāq-e Galam ʿAlī Şafar) is a village in Qeshlaq-e Sharqi Rural District of Qeshlaq Dasht District in Bileh Savar County, Ardabil province, Iran.

== Demographics ==
=== Population ===
At the time of the 2006 National Census, the village's population was 61 in 14 households. The following census in 2011 counted 66 people in 17 households. The 2016 census measured the population of the village as 65 people in 18 households.
