= Qeshlaq-e Esmail Khan Mohammad Izadi =

Village in Ardabil province, Iran

Qeshlaq-e Esmail Khan Mohammad Izadi Persian: قشلاق اسماعيل خان محمدايزدي
- Village
- Country: Iran
- Province: Ardabil
- County: Bileh Savar
- District: Qeshlaq Dasht
- Rural District: Qeshlaq-e Sharqi

Population (2016)
  - Total: 14
- Time zone: UTC+3:30 (IRST)

Qeshlaq-e Esmail Khan Mohammad Izadi (Persian: قشلاق اسماعيل خان محمدايزدي) (Note: Also romanized as Qeshlāq-e Esmāʿīl Khān Moḩammad Īzadī) is a village in Qeshlaq-e Sharqi Rural District of Qeshlaq Dasht District in Bileh Savar County, Ardabil province, Iran.

== Demographics ==
=== Population ===
At the time of the 2006 National Census, the village's population was 60 in 15 households. The following census in 2011 counted 20 people in four households. The 2016 census measured the population of the village as 14 people in four households.
