= Qeshlaq-e Baqersoli Hajj Khan Ali =

Village in Ardabil province, Iran

Qeshlaq-e Baqersoli Hajj Khan Ali Persian: قشلاق باقرسلي حاج خانعلي
- Village
- Country: Iran
- Province: Ardabil
- County: Bileh Savar
- District: Qeshlaq Dasht
- Rural District: Qeshlaq-e Sharqi

Population (2016)
  - Total: 392
- Time zone: UTC+3:30 (IRST)

Qeshlaq-e Baqersoli Hajj Khan Ali (Persian: قشلاق باقرسلي حاج خانعلي) (Note: Also romanized as Qeshlāq-e Bāqersolī Ḩājj Khān ʿAlī) is a village in Qeshlaq-e Sharqi Rural District of Qeshlaq Dasht District in Bileh Savar County, Ardabil province, Iran.

== Demographics ==
=== Population ===
At the time of the 2006 National Census, the village's population was 146 in 30 households. The following census in 2011 counted 188 people in 48 households. The 2016 census measured the population of the village as 392 people in 117 households.
