= Qeshlaq-e Hajj Abish =

Qeshlaq-e Hajj Abish (Persian: قشلاق حاج ابيش) may refer to the following villages in Iran:

- Qeshlaq-e Hajj Abish Hajj Mosum
- Qeshlaq-e Hajji Abish Hajj Rahim
