= Qusha Qeshlaq-e Qambai =

Village in Ardabil province, Iran

Qusha Qeshlaq-e Qambai Persian: قوشاقشلاق خاصاي
- Village
- Location within Iran
- Coordinates: 39°22′13″N 47°43′50″E
- Country: Iran
- Province: Ardabil
- County: Bileh Savar
- District: Qeshlaq Dasht
- Rural District: Qeshlaq-e Sharqi

Population (2016)
  - Total: 21
- Time zone: UTC+3:30 (IRST)

Qusha Qeshlaq-e Qambai (Persian: قوشاقشلاق قامباي) (Note: Also romanized as Qūshā Qeshlāq-e Qāmbāī) is a village in Qeshlaq-e Sharqi Rural District of Qeshlaq Dasht District in Bileh Savar County, Ardabil province, Iran.

== Demographics ==
=== Population ===
At the time of the 2006 National Census, the village's population was 29 in seven households. The following census in 2011 counted 26 people in seven households. The 2016 census measured the population of the village as 51 people in 18 households.
