= Qeshlaq-e Qarah Darreh-ye Asam Khan Kishi =

Village in Ardabil province, Iran

Qeshlaq-e Qarah Darreh-ye Asam Khan Kishi Persian: قشلاق قره دره اسمخان خان كيشي
- Village
- Location within Iran
- Coordinates: 39°26′16″N 47°56′54″E
- Country: Iran
- Province: Ardabil
- County: Bileh Savar
- District: Qeshlaq Dasht
- Rural District: Qeshlaq-e Sharqi

Population (2016)
  - Total: Below reporting threshold
- Time zone: UTC+3:30 (IRST)

Qeshlaq-e Qarah Darreh-ye Asam Khan Kishi (Persian: قشلاق قره دره اسمخان خان كيشي) (Note: Also romanized as Qeshlāq-e Qarah Darreh-ye Āsam Khān Kīshī) is a village in Qeshlaq-e Sharqi Rural District of Qeshlaq Dasht District in Bileh Savar County, Ardabil province, Iran.

== Demographics ==
=== Population ===
At the time of the 2006 National Census, the village's population was 21 in five households. The following census in 2011 counted 15 people in four households. The 2016 census measured the population of the village as below the reporting threshold.
