= Qeshlaq-e Owch Darreh ol Tafat =

Village in Ardabil province, Iran

Qeshlaq-e Owch Darreh ol Tafat Persian: قشلاق اوچ دره التفات
- Village
- Location within Iran
- Coordinates: 39°23′22″N 47°53′23″E
- Country: Iran
- Province: Ardabil
- County: Bileh Savar
- District: Qeshlaq Dasht
- Rural District: Qeshlaq-e Sharqi

Population (2016)
  - Total: 24
- Time zone: UTC+3:30 (IRST)

Qeshlaq-e Owch Darreh ol Tafat (Persian: قشلاق اوچ دره التفات) (Note: Also romanized as Qeshlāq-e Owch Darreh ol Tafāt) is a village in Qeshlaq-e Sharqi Rural District of Qeshlaq Dasht District in Bileh Savar County, Ardabil province, Iran.

== Demographics ==
=== Population ===
At the time of the 2006 National Census, the village's population was 28 in five households. The following census in 2011 counted 20 people in four households. The 2016 census measured the population of the village as 24 people in five households.
