= Qeshlaq-e Owch Quyi Ali Akbar =

Village in Ardabil province, Iran

Qeshlaq-e Owch Quyi Ali Akbar Persian: قشلاق اوچ قوئي علي اكبر
- Village
- Country: Iran
- Province: Ardabil
- County: Bileh Savar
- District: Qeshlaq Dasht
- Rural District: Qeshlaq-e Sharqi

Population (2016)
  - Total: 46
- Time zone: UTC+3:30 (IRST)

Qeshlaq-e Owch Quyi Ali Akbar (Persian: قشلاق اوچ قوئي علي اكبر) (Note: Also romanized as Qeshlāq-e Owch Qūyī ʿAlī Akbar) is a village in Qeshlaq-e Sharqi Rural District of Qeshlaq Dasht District in Bileh Savar County, Ardabil province, Iran.

== Demographics ==
=== Population ===
At the time of the 2006 National Census, the village's population was 40 in 10 households. The following census in 2011 counted 42 people in nine households. The 2016 census measured the population of the village as 46 people in 11 households.
