= Qeshlaq-e Molla Naqi Aqam Owghlan =

Village in Ardabil province, Iran

Qeshlaq-e Molla Naqi Aqam Owghlan Persian: قشلاق ملانقي اقام اوغلان
- Village
- Location within Iran
- Coordinates: 39°26′48″N 47°49′04″E
- Country: Iran
- Province: Ardabil
- County: Bileh Savar
- District: Qeshlaq Dasht
- Rural District: Qeshlaq-e Sharqi

Population (2016)
  - Total: 75
- Time zone: UTC+3:30 (IRST)

Qeshlaq-e Molla Naqi Aqam Owghlan (Persian: قشلاق ملانقي اقام اوغلان) (Note: Also romanized as Qeshlāq-e Mollā Naqī Āqām Owghlān) is a village in Qeshlaq-e Sharqi Rural District of Qeshlaq Dasht District in Bileh Savar County, Ardabil province, Iran.

== Demographics ==
=== Population ===
At the time of the 2006 National Census, the village's population was 57 in 11 households. The following census in 2011 counted 47 people in 13 households. The 2016 census measured the population of the village as 75 people in 22 households.
