= Qeshlaq-e Babash-e Sofla =

Village in Ardabil province, Iran

Qeshlaq-e Babash-e Sofla Persian: قشلاق باباش سفلي
- Village
- Country: Iran
- Province: Ardabil
- County: Bileh Savar
- District: Qeshlaq Dasht
- Rural District: Qeshlaq-e Sharqi

Population (2016)
  - Total: 98
- Time zone: UTC+3:30 (IRST)

Qeshlaq-e Babash-e Sofla (Persian: قشلاق باباش سفلي) (Note: Also romanized as Qeshlāq-e Bābāsh-e Soflá) is a village in Qeshlaq-e Sharqi Rural District of Qeshlaq Dasht District in Bileh Savar County, Ardabil province, Iran.

== Demographics ==
=== Population ===
At the time of the 2006 National Census, the village's population was 97 in 22 households. The following census in 2011 counted 92 people in 26 households. The 2016 census measured the population of the village as 98 people in 29 households.
