= Qusha Qeshlaq-e Khasai =

Village in Ardabil province, Iran

Qusha Qeshlaq-e Khasai Persian: قوشاقشلاق خاصاي
- Village
- Country: Iran
- Province: Ardabil
- County: Bileh Savar
- District: Qeshlaq Dasht
- Rural District: Qeshlaq-e Sharqi

Population (2016)
  - Total: 21
- Time zone: UTC+3:30 (IRST)

Qusha Qeshlaq-e Khasai (Persian: قوشاقشلاق خاصاي) (Note: Also romanized as Qūshā Qeshlāq-e Khāṣāī) is a village in Qeshlaq-e Sharqi Rural District of Qeshlaq Dasht District in Bileh Savar County, Ardabil province, Iran.

== Demographics ==
=== Population ===
At the time of the 2006 National Census, the village's population was 14 in four households. The following census in 2011 counted a population below the reporting threshold. The 2016 census measured the population of the village as 21 people in seven households.
