= Qeshlaq-e Safar Ali Nosrat =

Village in Ardabil province, Iran

Qeshlaq-e Safar Ali Nosrat Persian: قشلاق صفرعلي نصرت
- Village
- Location within Iran
- Coordinates: 39°23′39″N 47°48′43″E
- Country: Iran
- Province: Ardabil
- County: Bileh Savar
- District: Qeshlaq Dasht
- Rural District: Qeshlaq-e Sharqi

Population (2016)
  - Total: 41
- Time zone: UTC+3:30 (IRST)

Qeshlaq-e Safar Ali Nosrat (Persian: قشلاق صفرعلي نصرت) (Note: Also romanized as Qeshlāq-e Şafar ʿAlī Noṣrat) is a village in Qeshlaq-e Sharqi Rural District of Qeshlaq Dasht District in Bileh Savar County, Ardabil province, Iran.

== Demographics ==
=== Population ===
At the time of the 2006 National Census, the village's population was 76 in 13 households. The following census in 2011 counted 47 people in 12 households. The 2016 census measured the population of the village as 41 people in 11 households.
