= Qeshlaq-e Safar Ali Ghib Ali =

Village in Ardabil province, Iran

Qeshlaq-e Safar Ali Ghib Ali Persian: قشلاق صفرعلي غيب علي
- Village
- Location within Iran
- Coordinates: 39°23′55″N 47°48′58″E
- Country: Iran
- Province: Ardabil
- County: Bileh Savar
- District: Qeshlaq Dasht
- Rural District: Qeshlaq-e Sharqi

Population (2016)
  - Total: 52
- Time zone: UTC+3:30 (IRST)

Qeshlaq-e Safar Ali Ghib Ali (Persian: قشلاق صفرعلي غيب علي) (Note: Also romanized as Qeshlāq-e Şafar ʿAlī Ghīb ʿAlī) is a village in Qeshlaq-e Sharqi Rural District of Qeshlaq Dasht District in Bileh Savar County, Ardabil province, Iran.

== Demographics ==
=== Population ===
At the time of the 2006 National Census, the village's population was 55 in 10 households. The following census in 2011 counted 41 people in 11 households. The 2016 census measured the population of the village as 52 people in 17 households.
