= Qeshlaq Aghdash-e Nasir =

Village in Ardabil province, Iran

Qeshlaq Aghdash-e Nasir Persian: قشلاق اغداش نصير
- Village
- Location within Iran
- Coordinates: 39°27′05″N 47°50′16″E
- Country: Iran
- Province: Ardabil
- County: Bileh Savar
- District: Qeshlaq Dasht
- Rural District: Qeshlaq-e Sharqi

Population (2016)
  - Total: 45
- Time zone: UTC+3:30 (IRST)

Qeshlaq Aghdash-e Nasir (Persian: قشلاق اغداش نصير) (Note: Also romanized as Qeshlāq-e Āghdāsh-e Naṣīr) is a village in Qeshlaq-e Sharqi Rural District of Qeshlaq Dasht District in Bileh Savar County, Ardabil province, Iran.

== Demographics ==
=== Population ===
At the time of the 2006 National Census, the village's population was 30 in six households. The following census in 2011 counted a population below the reporting threshold. The 2016 census measured the population of the village as 45 people in 15 households.
