= Qeshlaq-e Padar Hajji Bahrish =

Village in Ardabil province, Iran

Qeshlaq-e Padar Hajji Bahrish Persian: قشلاق پادارحاجي بهريش
- Village
- Country: Iran
- Province: Ardabil
- County: Bileh Savar
- District: Qeshlaq Dasht
- Rural District: Qeshlaq-e Sharqi

Population (2016)
  - Total: 15
- Time zone: UTC+3:30 (IRST)

Qeshlaq-e Padar Hajji Bahrish (Persian: قشلاق پادارحاجي بهريش) (Note: Also romanized as Qeshlāq-e Pādār Ḩājjī Bahrīsh) is a village in Qeshlaq-e Sharqi Rural District of Qeshlaq Dasht District in Bileh Savar County, Ardabil province, Iran.

== Demographics ==
=== Population ===
At the time of the 2006 National Census, the village's population was 94 in 20 households. The following census in 2011 counted 80 people in 21 households. The 2016 census measured the population of the village as 15 people in four households.
