= Qeshlaq-e Beyg Ali-ye Olya =

Village in Ardabil province, Iran

Qeshlaq-e Beyg Ali-ye Olya Persian: قشلاق بيگ علي عليا
- Village
- Location within Iran
- Country: Iran
- Province: Ardabil
- County: Bileh Savar
- District: Qeshlaq Dasht
- Rural District: Qeshlaq-e Sharqi

Population (2016)
  - Total: 37
- Time zone: UTC+3:30 (IRST)

Qeshlaq-e Beyg Ali-ye Olya (Persian: قشلاق بيگ علي عليا) (Note: Also romanized as Qeshlāq-e Beyg ʿAlī-ye ‘Olyā) is a village in Qeshlaq-e Sharqi Rural District of Qeshlaq Dasht District in Bileh Savar County, Ardabil province, Iran.

== Demographics ==
=== Population ===
At the time of the 2006 National Census, the village's population was 88 in 18 households. The following census in 2011 counted 33 people in 11 households. The 2016 census measured the population of the village as 37 people in 10 households.
