= Qeshlaq-e Qarah Darreh-ye Kahel Qeshlaq Farasat =

Village in Ardabil province, Iran

Qeshlaq-e Qarah Darreh-ye Kahel Qeshlaq Farasat Persian: قشلاق قره دره كهل قشلاق فرصت
- Village
- Location within Iran
- Coordinates: 39°27′06″N 47°57′44″E
- Country: Iran
- Province: Ardabil
- County: Bileh Savar
- District: Qeshlaq Dasht
- Rural District: Qeshlaq-e Sharqi

Population (2016)
  - Total: 77
- Time zone: UTC+3:30 (IRST)

Qeshlaq-e Qarah Darreh-ye Kahel Qeshlaq Farasat (Persian: قشلاق قره دره كهل قشلاق فرصت) (Note: Also romanized as Qeshlāq-e Qarah Darreh-ye Kahel Qeshlāq-e Faraṣat) is a village in Qeshlaq-e Sharqi Rural District of Qeshlaq Dasht District in Bileh Savar County, Ardabil province, Iran.

== Demographics ==
=== Population ===
At the time of the 2006 National Census, the village's population was 73 in 14 households. The following census in 2011 counted 25 people in seven households. The 2016 census measured the population of the village as 77 people in 26 households.
