= Qeshlaq-e Qarah Darreh-ye Asam Khan Hajj Sadallah =

Village in Ardabil province, Iran

Qeshlaq-e Qarah Darreh-ye Asam Khan Hajj Sadallah Persian: قشلاق قره دره اسم خان حاج سعداله
- Village
- Country: Iran
- Province: Ardabil
- County: Bileh Savar
- District: Qeshlaq Dasht
- Rural District: Qeshlaq-e Sharqi

Population (2016)
  - Total: 28
- Time zone: UTC+3:30 (IRST)

Qeshlaq-e Qarah Darreh-ye Asam Khan Hajj Sadallah (Persian: قشلاق قره دره اسم خان حاج سعداله) (Note: Also romanized as Qeshlāq-e Qarah Darreh-ye Āsam Khān Ḩājj Saʿdāllah) is a village in Qeshlaq-e Sharqi Rural District of Qeshlaq Dasht District in Bileh Savar County, Ardabil province, Iran.

== Demographics ==
=== Population ===
At the time of the 2006 National Census, the village's population was 42 in nine households. The following census in 2011 counted 17 people in seven households. The 2016 census measured the population of the village as 28 people in nine households.
