= Qeshlaq Aghdash-e Hajji Saram =

Village in Ardabil province, Iran

Qeshlaq Aghdash-e Hajji Saram Persian: قشلاق اغداش حاجي سارم
- Village
- Location within Iran
- Coordinates: 39°28′10″N 47°50′13″E
- Country: Iran
- Province: Ardabil
- County: Bileh Savar
- District: Qeshlaq Dasht
- Rural District: Qeshlaq-e Sharqi

Population (2016)
  - Total: 36
- Time zone: UTC+3:30 (IRST)

Qeshlaq Aghdash-e Hajji Saram (Persian: قشلاق اغداش حاجي سارم) (Note: Also romanized as Qeshlāq Āghdāsh-e Ḩājjī Sāram) is a village in Qeshlaq-e Sharqi Rural District of Qeshlaq Dasht District in Bileh Savar County, Ardabil province, Iran.

== Demographics ==
=== Population ===
At the time of the 2006 National Census, the village's population was 51 in nine households. The village did not appear in the following census of 2011. The 2016 census measured the population of the village as 36 people in 10 households.
