= Qeshlaq-e Nariman Kandi Amir Aslan =

Village in Ardabil province, Iran

Qeshlaq-e Nariman Kandi Amir Aslan Persian: قشلاق نريمان كندي اميراصلان
- Village
- Location within Iran
- Coordinates: 39°24′41″N 48°02′07″E
- Country: Iran
- Province: Ardabil
- County: Bileh Savar
- District: Qeshlaq Dasht
- Rural District: Qeshlaq-e Sharqi

Population (2016)
  - Total: 48
- Time zone: UTC+3:30 (IRST)

Qeshlaq-e Nariman Kandi Amir Aslan (Persian: قشلاق نريمان كندي اميراصلان) (Note: Also romanized as Qeshlāq-e Narīmān Kandī Amīr Āṣlān) is a village in Qeshlaq-e Sharqi Rural District of Qeshlaq Dasht District in Bileh Savar County, Ardabil province, Iran.

== Demographics ==
=== Population ===
At the time of the 2006 National Census, the village's population was 43 in 11 households. The following census in 2011 counted 46 people in 12 households. The 2016 census measured the population of the village as 48 people in 14 households.
