= Qeshlaq-e Qarah Jalu Hajji Sadeq =

Village in Ardabil province, Iran

Qeshlaq-e Qarah Jalu Hajji Sadeq Persian: قشلاق قره جالوحاجي صادق
- Village
- Location within Iran
- Coordinates: 39°27′50″N 47°48′18″E
- Country: Iran
- Province: Ardabil
- County: Bileh Savar
- District: Qeshlaq Dasht
- Rural District: Qeshlaq-e Sharqi

Population (2016)
  - Total: 35
- Time zone: UTC+3:30 (IRST)

Qeshlaq-e Qarah Jalu Hajji Sadeq (Persian: قشلاق قره جالوحاجي صادق) (Note: Also romanized as Qeshlāq-e Qarah Jālū Ḩājjī Şādeq) is a village in Qeshlaq-e Sharqi Rural District of Qeshlaq Dasht District in Bileh Savar County, Ardabil province, Iran.

== Demographics ==
=== Population ===
At the time of the 2006 National Census, the village's population was 47 in eight households. The following census in 2011 counted 41 people in 10 households. The 2016 census measured the population of the village as 35 people in nine households.
