= Qeshlaq-e Khan Goldi Kamaran =

Village in Ardabil province, Iran

Qeshlaq-e Khan Goldi Kamaran Persian: قشلاق خان گلدي كامران
- Village
- Country: Iran
- Province: Ardabil
- County: Bileh Savar
- District: Qeshlaq Dasht
- Rural District: Qeshlaq-e Sharqi

Population (2016)
  - Total: 80
- Time zone: UTC+3:30 (IRST)

Qeshlaq-e Khan Goldi Kamaran (Persian: قشلاق خان گلدي كامران) (Note: Also romanized as Qeshlāq-e Khān Goldī Kāmarān) is a village in Qeshlaq-e Sharqi Rural District of Qeshlaq Dasht District in Bileh Savar County, Ardabil province, Iran.

== Demographics ==
=== Population ===
At the time of the 2006 National Census, the village's population was 134 in 32 households. The following census in 2011 counted 93 people in 25 households. The 2016 census measured the population of the village as 80 people in 24 households.
