= Qeshlaq-e Khan Hoseyn Vadelan Hajj Mohammad Taqi =

Village in Ardabil province, Iran

Qeshlaq-e Khan Hoseyn Vadelan Hajj Mohammad Taqi Persian: قشلاق خان حسين ودلان حاج محمدتقي
- Village
- Country: Iran
- Province: Ardabil
- County: Bileh Savar
- District: Qeshlaq Dasht
- Rural District: Qeshlaq-e Sharqi

Population (2016)
  - Total: 83
- Time zone: UTC+3:30 (IRST)

Qeshlaq-e Khan Hoseyn Vadelan Hajj Mohammad Taqi (Persian: قشلاق خان حسين ودلان حاج محمدتقي) (Note: Also romanized as Qeshlāq-e Khān Ḩoseyn Vadelān Ḩājj Moḩammad Taqī) is a village in Qeshlaq-e Sharqi Rural District of Qeshlaq Dasht District in Bileh Savar County, Ardabil province, Iran.

== Demographics ==
=== Population ===
At the time of the 2006 National Census, the village's population was 62 in 11 households. The following census in 2011 counted 65 people in 15 households. The 2016 census measured the population of the village as 83 people in 23 households.
