= Jafarabad, Iran =

City in Ardabil province, Iran

Jafarabad Persian: جعفرآباد
- City
- Location within Iran
- Coordinates: 39°26′10″N 48°05′46″E
- Country: Iran
- Province: Ardabil
- County: Bileh Savar
- District: Qeshlaq Dasht
- Established as a city: 1995

Population (2016)
  - Total: 7,226
- Time zone: UTC+3:30 (IRST)

Jafarabad (Persian: جعفرآباد) (Note: Also romanized as Ja‘farābād; formerly Hajji Jafar Kandi (حاجّی جَعفَر كَندی), also romanized as Ḩājjī Ja‘far Kandī) is a city in, and the capital of, Qeshlaq Dasht District in Bileh Savar County, Ardabil province, Iran. It also serves as the administrative center for Qeshlaq-e Sharqi Rural District. The village of Jafarabad was converted to a city in 1995. The city is on the Moghan Plain, about 26 km northwest of Bileh Savar, the capital of the county.

== Demographics ==
=== Population ===
At the time of the 2006 National Census, the city's population was 24,685 in 5,262 households. The following census in 2011 counted 7,706 people in 2,024 households. The 2016 census measured the population of the city as 7,226 people in 2,037 households.

== Overview ==
The expansion of the urban area of Jafarabad is in the northwest-southeast direction, and longitudinally, and the main road of Bileh Savar Moghan—Parsabad Moghan passes through it.

The place of Jafarabad and its surrounding plains was considered as Qeshlaq-e Shahsavan by nomads in the past. Due to its favorable geographical location, the first construction activities of the region started there. With the start of the construction activities of the Shiar Azerbaijan Company around 1939, the initial nucleus of the settlement was formed. With the implementation of the rural leader plan (from the rural development plans prepared by the Islamic Revolution Housing Foundation and Reforms) its residential fabric became more regular.
