= Qeshlaq-e Khan Goldi Bala Owghlan =

Village in Ardabil province, Iran

Qeshlaq-e Khan Goldi Bala Owghlan Persian: قشلاق خان گلدي بالااوغلان
- Village
- Location within Iran
- Country: Iran
- Province: Ardabil
- County: Bileh Savar
- District: Qeshlaq Dasht
- Rural District: Qeshlaq-e Sharqi

Population (2016)
  - Total: 37
- Time zone: UTC+3:30 (IRST)

Qeshlaq-e Khan Goldi Bala Owghlan (Persian: قشلاق خان گلدي بالااوغلان) (Note: Also romanized as Qeshlāq-e Khān Goldī Bālā Owghlān) is a village in Qeshlaq-e Sharqi Rural District of Qeshlaq Dasht District in Bileh Savar County, Ardabil province, Iran.

== Demographics ==
=== Population ===
At the time of the 2006 National Census, the village's population was 25 in seven households. The following census in 2011 counted a population below the reporting threshold. The 2016 census measured the population of the village as 37 people in 10 households.
