= Qeshlaq-e Khan Goldi Hajj Ahmad =

Village in Ardabil province, Iran

Qeshlaq-e Khan Goldi Hajj Ahmad Persian: قشلاق خان گلدي حاج احمد
- Village
- Country: Iran
- Province: Ardabil
- County: Bileh Savar
- District: Qeshlaq Dasht
- Rural District: Qeshlaq-e Sharqi

Population (2016)
  - Total: 34
- Time zone: UTC+3:30 (IRST)

Qeshlaq-e Khan Goldi Hajj Ahmad (Persian: قشلاق خان گلدي حاج احمد) (Note: Also romanized as Qeshlāq-e Khān Goldī Ḩājj Aḩmad) is a village in Qeshlaq-e Sharqi Rural District of Qeshlaq Dasht District in Bileh Savar County, Ardabil province, Iran.

== Demographics ==
=== Population ===
At the time of the 2006 National Census, the village's population was 21 in six households. The following census in 2011 counted 42 people in 10 households. The 2016 census measured the population of the village as 34 people in 10 households.
