= Qeshlaq-e Khan Goldi Ogham Owghlan =

Village in Ardabil province, Iran

Qeshlaq-e Khan Goldi Ogham Owghlan Persian: قشلاق خان گلدي اغام اوغلان
- Village
- Location within Iran
- Coordinates: 39°29′10″N 47°54′56″E
- Country: Iran
- Province: Ardabil
- County: Bileh Savar
- District: Qeshlaq Dasht
- Rural District: Qeshlaq-e Sharqi

Population (2016)
  - Total: 16
- Time zone: UTC+3:30 (IRST)

Qeshlaq-e Khan Goldi Ogham Owghlan (Persian: قشلاق خان گلدي اغام اوغلان) (Note: Also romanized as Qeshlāq-e Khān Goldī Oghām Owghlān) is a village in Qeshlaq-e Sharqi Rural District of Qeshlaq Dasht District in Bileh Savar County, Ardabil province, Iran.

== Demographics ==
=== Population ===
At the time of the 2006 National Census, the village's population was 18 in four households. The following census in 2011 counted a population below the reporting threshold. The 2016 census measured the population of the village as 16 people in five households.
