= Qeshlaq-e Khan Goldi Davakishi =

Village in Ardabil province, Iran

Qeshlaq-e Khan Goldi Davakishi Persian: قشلاق خان گلدي دعواكيشي
- Village
- Country: Iran
- Province: Ardabil
- County: Bileh Savar
- District: Qeshlaq Dasht
- Rural District: Qeshlaq-e Sharqi

Population (2016)
  - Total: 41
- Time zone: UTC+3:30 (IRST)

Qeshlaq-e Khan Goldi Davakishi (Persian: قشلاق خان گلدي دعواكيشي) (Note: Also romanized as Qeshlāq-e Khān Goldī Daʿvākīshī) is a village in Qeshlaq-e Sharqi Rural District of Qeshlaq Dasht District in Bileh Savar County, Ardabil province, Iran.

== Demographics ==
=== Population ===
At the time of the 2006 National Census, the village's population was 49 in 11 households. The following census in 2011 counted 26 people in five households. The 2016 census measured the population of the village as 41 people in nine households.
