= Qeshlaq-e Khan Hoseyn Vadelan Teymur =

Village in Ardabil province, Iran

Qeshlaq-e Khan Hoseyn Vadelan Teymur Persian: قشلاق خان حسين ودلان تيمور
- Village
- Country: Iran
- Province: Ardabil
- County: Bileh Savar
- District: Qeshlaq Dasht
- Rural District: Qeshlaq-e Sharqi

Population (2016)
  - Total: 65
- Time zone: UTC+3:30 (IRST)

Qeshlaq-e Khan Hoseyn Vadelan Teymur (Persian: قشلاق خان حسين ودلان تيمور) (Note: Also romanized as Qeshlāq-e Khān Ḩoseyn Vadelān Ţeymūr) is a village in Qeshlaq-e Sharqi Rural District of Qeshlaq Dasht District in Bileh Savar County, Ardabil province, Iran.

== Demographics ==
=== Population ===
At the time of the 2006 National Census, the village's population was 32 in seven households. The following census in 2011 counted 12 people in four households. The 2016 census measured the population of the village as 59 people in 16 households.
