= Qeshlaq-e Khan Goldi Mostanlu =

Village in Ardabil province, Iran

Qeshlaq-e Khan Goldi Mostanlu Persian: قشلاق خان گلدي مستانلو
- Village
- Country: Iran
- Province: Ardabil
- County: Bileh Savar
- District: Qeshlaq Dasht
- Rural District: Qeshlaq-e Sharqi

Population (2016)
  - Total: 79
- Time zone: UTC+3:30 (IRST)

Qeshlaq-e Khan Goldi Mostanlu (Persian: قشلاق خان گلدي مستانلو) (Note: Also romanized as Qeshlāq-e Khān Goldī Mostānlū) is a village in Qeshlaq-e Sharqi Rural District of Qeshlaq Dasht District in Bileh Savar County, Ardabil province, Iran.

== Demographics ==
=== Population ===
At the time of the 2006 National Census, the village's population was 87 in 22 households. The following census in 2011 counted 193 people in 49 households. The 2016 census measured the population of the village as 79 people in 21 households.
