= Abish (name) =

Abish may refer to the following people:

== As a given name ==
- Abish (Book of Mormon), a Lamanite woman who lived in the 1st century BC
- Absh Khatun, the Queen of Persia from 1263 to 1287
- Abish Kekilbayev (1939–2015), Kazakhstani politician
- Abish Mathew, Indian stand-up comedian and YouTuber

== As a surname ==
- Cecile Abish (born 1930), American artist
- Walter Abish (1931–2022), Austrian-American author of experimental novels and short stories
