= Abish-Kyand =

- Location within Azerbaijan
- Coordinates: 39°26′N 48°27′E
- Country: Azerbaijan
- Rayon: Bilasuvar
- Time zone: UTC+4 (AZT)

Abish-Kyand is a village in the Bilasuvar Rayon of Azerbaijan.
