= Hajji Babakhan, Sistan and Baluchestan =

Hajji Babakhan حاجي باباخان
- Village
- Country: Iran
- Province: Sistan and Baluchestan
- County: Hirmand
- Bakhsh: Central
- Rural District: Dust Mohammad

Population (2006)
  - Total: 124
- Time zone: UTC+3:30 (IRST)
  - Summer (DST): UTC+4:30 (IRDT)

Hajji Babakhan (Persian: حاجي باباخان, also Romanized as Ḩājjī Bābākhān) is a village in Dust Mohammad Rural District, in the Central District of Hirmand County, Sistan and Baluchestan Province, Iran. At the 2006 census, its population was 124, in 20 families.
