= Qeshlaq-e Sharqi Rural District =

Rural district in Ardabil province, Iran

Qeshlaq-e Sharqi Rural District Persian: دهستان قشلاق شرقي
- Rural District
- Location within Iran
- Coordinates: 39°27′N 47°59′E
- Country: Iran
- Province: Ardabil
- County: Bileh Savar
- District: Qeshlaq Dasht
- Established: 1987
- Capital: Jafarabad

Population (2016)
  - Total: 10,052
- Time zone: UTC+3:30 (IRST)

Qeshlaq-e Sharqi Rural District (Persian: دهستان قشلاق شرقي) is in Qeshlaq Dasht District of Bileh Savar County, Ardabil province, Iran. It is administered from the city of Jafarabad.

== Demographics ==
=== Population ===
At the time of the 2006 National Census, the rural district's population was 10,802 in 2,283 households. There were 9,560 inhabitants in 2,452 households at the following census of 2011. The 2016 census measured the population of the rural district as 10,052 in 2,881 households. The most populous of its 130 villages was Ruh Kandi, with 1,576 people.

=== Other villages in the rural district ===
- Ali Khan Kandi
- Azizabad
- Chalmeh Kandi
- Gurdigol
- Gurdigol-e Nur ol Din
- Hajji Baba Khan
- Hajji Havar Kandi
- Khalifehlu Kandi-ye Bozorg
- Khan Baba Kandi
- Khvor Khvor-e Olya
- Mayeh Darrehsi
- Owch Darreh-ye Moghanlu Ogham Ali
- Petelqan
- Qeshlaq Aghdash-e Bahram
- Qeshlaq Aghdash-e Beyglar
- Qeshlaq Aghdash-e Hajji Saram
- Qeshlaq Aghdash-e Hasan Hazi Owghli
- Qeshlaq Aghdash-e Mahmud
- Qeshlaq Aghdash-e Nasir
- Qeshlaq-e Ali Karimi
- Qeshlaq-e Ali Shobani
- Qeshlaq-e Aqa Khan-e Ekhtiar
- Qeshlaq-e Arablu Asrafil
- Qeshlaq-e Babash-e Olya
- Qeshlaq-e Babash-e Sofla
- Qeshlaq-e Bakhtiar
- Qeshlaq-e Baqersoli Ali Sahami
- Qeshlaq-e Baqersoli Hajj Khan Ali
- Qeshlaq-e Baqersoli Satar
- Qeshlaq-e Beyg Ali-ye Olya
- Qeshlaq-e Beyg Ali-ye Sofla
- Qeshlaq-e Beyg Ali-ye Vosta
- Qeshlaq-e Esmail Khan Jalil Ranjaber
- Qeshlaq-e Esmail Khan Mohammad Izadi
- Qeshlaq-e Galam Ali Hajj Hoseyn
- Qeshlaq-e Galam Ali Hajj Savad
- Qeshlaq-e Galam Ali Safar
- Qeshlaq-e Hajj Abish Hajj Mosum
- Qeshlaq-e Hajj Aman
- Qeshlaq-e Hajj Dalan Khan Hoseyn Khodayar
- Qeshlaq-e Hajj Hashem-e Arshad
- Qeshlaq-e Hajj Hashem-e Neysar
- Qeshlaq-e Hajj Hashem-e Nosrat
- Qeshlaq-e Hajj Heydar Farman
- Qeshlaq-e Hajj Heydar Gol Ahmad
- Qeshlaq-e Hajj Hoseyn Khan
- Qeshlaq-e Hajj Khan Hoseyn Samid
- Qeshlaq-e Hajj Shirin Mosib
- Qeshlaq-e Hajj Soleyman-e Akbar Keramati
- Qeshlaq-e Hajj Soleyman-e Ali Goshad Teymuri
- Qeshlaq-e Hajji Abish Hajj Rahim
- Qeshlaq-e Hajji Heydar Havar
- Qeshlaq-e Hajji Savad
- Qeshlaq-e Jafar Qoli
- Qeshlaq-e Khan Goldi Bala Owghlan
- Qeshlaq-e Khan Goldi Davakishi
- Qeshlaq-e Khan Goldi Hajj Ahmad
- Qeshlaq-e Khan Goldi Kamaran
- Qeshlaq-e Khan Goldi Mostanlu
- Qeshlaq-e Khan Goldi Ogham Owghlan
- Qeshlaq-e Khan Hoseyn Vadelan Hajj Mohammad Taqi
- Qeshlaq-e Khan Hoseyn Vadelan Teymur
- Qeshlaq-e Mira Alam
- Qeshlaq-e Molla Naqi Aqam Owghlan
- Qeshlaq-e Molla Naqi Qanbar
- Qeshlaq-e Nariman Kandi Amir Aslan
- Qeshlaq-e Nariman Kandi Hajj Khan Owghlan
- Qeshlaq-e Nariman Kandi Hajji Havar
- Qeshlaq-e Owch Darreh ol Tafat
- Qeshlaq-e Owch Darreh Savad
- Qeshlaq-e Owch Quyi Ali Akbar
- Qeshlaq-e Owch Quyi Hajj Hasan Shayiqi
- Qeshlaq-e Padar Hajji Bahrish
- Qeshlaq-e Padarjamal
- Qeshlaq-e Qahreman
- Qeshlaq-e Qarah Darreh-ye Asam Khan Asad
- Qeshlaq-e Qarah Darreh-ye Asam Khan Azadkhan
- Qeshlaq-e Qarah Darreh-ye Asam Khan Hajj Sadallah
- Qeshlaq-e Qarah Darreh-ye Asam Khan Kishi
- Qeshlaq-e Qarah Darreh-ye Asam Khan Safar Kandi
- Qeshlaq-e Qarah Darreh-ye Asam Khan Tahraj
- Qeshlaq-e Qarah Darreh-ye Aziz Rostam
- Qeshlaq-e Qarah Darreh-ye Hajji Alish
- Qeshlaq-e Qarah Darreh-ye Kahel Qeshlaq Farasat
- Qeshlaq-e Qarah Darreh-ye Kahel va Qeshlaq-e Hajji Shahverdi
- Qeshlaq-e Qarah Jalu Hajji Iman
- Qeshlaq-e Qarah Jalu Hajji Sadeq
- Qeshlaq-e Qarqoli Rahim Talebi
- Qeshlaq-e Rostam
- Qeshlaq-e Safar Ali Ghib Ali
- Qeshlaq-e Safar Ali Nosrat
- Qeshlaq-e Shah Khanem Ali Borat
- Qeshlaq-e Shah Khanem Qadir
- Qeshlaq-e Sufi Hasan
- Qeshlaq-e Sufi Qadir
- Qusha Qeshlaq-e Khasai
- Qusha Qeshlaq-e Mansur va Rahman
- Qusha Qeshlaq-e Qambai
- Qusha Qeshlaq-e Rezali Beyg
- Vali Mamilu
