= Qeshlaq Dasht District =

District in Ardabil province, Iran

Qeshlaq Dasht District Persian: بخش قشلاق دشت
- District
- Location within Iran
- Coordinates: 39°22′N 47°56′E
- Country: Iran
- Province: Ardabil
- County: Bileh Savar
- Established: 1991
- Capital: Jafarabad

Population (2016)
  - Total: 22,146
- Time zone: UTC+3:30 (IRST)

Qeshlaq Dasht District (Persian: بخش قشلاق دشت) is in Bileh Savar County, Ardabil province, Iran. Its capital is the city of Jafarabad.

== Demographics ==
=== Population ===
At the time of the 2006 National Census, the district's population was 24,685 in 5,262 households. The following census in 2011 counted 22,848 people in 5,948 households. The 2016 census measured the population of the district as 22,146 inhabitants living in 6,348 households.

=== Administrative divisions ===
Qeshlaq Dasht District Population
Administrative Divisions	2006	2011	2016
Qeshlaq-e Jonubi RD	6,859	5,582	4,868
Qeshlaq-e Sharqi RD	10,802	9,560	10,052
Jafarabad (city)	7,024	7,706	7,226
Total	24,685	22,848	22,146
RD = Rural District
