= Bileh Savar County =

County in Ardabil province, Iran

Bileh Savar County Persian: شهرستان بیله ‌سوار
- County
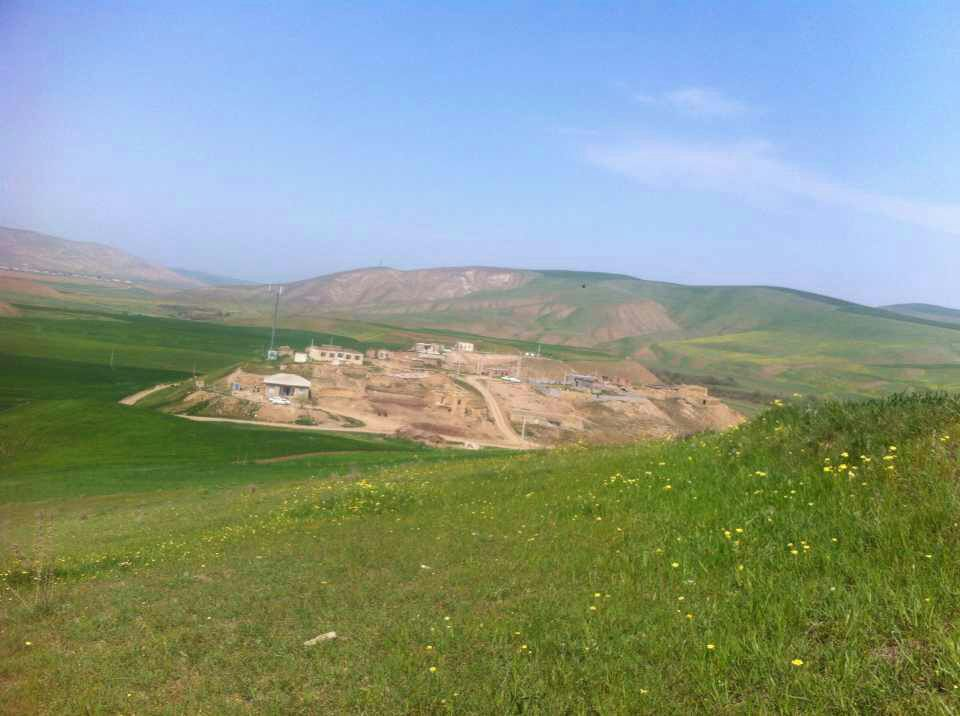
- The village of Beyg Baghlu

- Location of Bileh Savar County in Ardabil province (top, purple)

- Location of Ardabil province in Iran
- Coordinates: 39°20′N 48°00′E
- Country: Iran
- Province: Ardabil
- Established: 1991
- Capital: Bileh Savar
- Districts: Central, Qeshlaq Dasht

Area
  - Total: 2,981 km^{2} (1,151 sq mi)
- Elevation: 83 m (272 ft)

Population (2016)
  - Total: 51,404
  - Density: 17.24/km^{2} (44.66/sq mi)
- Time zone: UTC+3:30 (IRST)

Bileh Savar County (Persian: شهرستان بیله ‌سوار) (Note: Azerbaijani: Biləsuvar) is in Ardabil province, Iran. Its capital is the city of Bileh Savar.

== Demographics ==
=== Population ===
At the time of the 2006 National Census, the county's population was 54,471 in 11,700 households. The following census in 2011 counted 53,768 people in 14,019 households. The 2016 census measured the population of the county as 51,404 in 15,114 households.

=== Administrative divisions ===
Bileh Savar County's population history and administrative structure over three consecutive censuses are shown in the following table.

Bileh Savar County Population
Administrative Divisions	2006	2011	2016
Central District	29,786	30,920	29,111
Anjirlu RD	4,368	4,049	2,951
Gug Tappeh RD	11,391	11,688	9,972
Bileh Savar (city)	14,027	15,183	16,188
Qeshlaq Dasht District	24,685	22,848	22,146
Qeshlaq-e Jonubi RD	6,859	5,582	4,868
Qeshlaq-e Sharqi RD	10,802	9,560	10,052
Jafarabad (city)	7,024	7,706	7,226
Total	54,471	53,768	51,404
RD = Rural District

== Border crossing ==
The county contains a border crossing between Azerbaijan and Iran. According to the Tehran Times, border crossings increased through 2019 and are primarily related to exchanges with the predominantly Azerbaijani city of Ardabil in Ardabil County.

== See also ==
Media related to Bileh Savar County at Wikimedia Commons
