= Qeshlaq-e Ilkhchi =

Qeshlaq-e Ilkhchi (Persian: قشلاق ايلخچي), also rendered as Qeshlaq-e Ilchi, may refer to:

- Qeshlaq-e Ilkhchi, alternate name of Ilkhchi, Germi
- Qeshlaq-e Ilkhchi-ye Olya
- Qeshlaq-e Ilkhchi-ye Sofla
