= Burakabad =

Burakabad or Burkabad (Persian: بورك اباد) may refer to:

- Burkabad, Ardabil
- Burakabad, Kermanshah
