= Parchin (disambiguation) =

Parchin is an Iranian military complex near Tehran.

Parchin (Persian: پرچين) may also refer to:

- Parchin, Ardabil
- Parchin-e Olya, Ardabil Province
- Parchin-e Sofla, Ardabil Province
- Parchin, Tehran
- Parchin, Zanjan
