= Meykhosh =

Village in Ardabil province, Iran

Meykhosh Persian: ميخوش
- Village
- Location within Iran
- Coordinates: 38°59′40″N 48°16′42″E
- Country: Iran
- Province: Ardabil
- County: Germi
- District: Muran
- Rural District: Ojarud-e Sharqi

Population (2016)
  - Total: 90
- Time zone: UTC+3:30 (IRST)

Meykhosh (Persian: ميخوش) (Note: Also romanized as Meykhowsh and Meykhvosh; also known as Markhash and Sīkhowsh; Azerbaijani: Muxuş) is a village in Ojarud-e Sharqi Rural District of Muran District in Germi County, (Note: Formerly Moghan County) Ardabil province, Iran.

Meykhosh is about 4 km south of Zahra, the capital of Muran District. Zahra is 30 km east of Germi. Meykhosh and Zahra are close (one km) to the border of Azerbaijan.

== Demographics ==
=== Language ===
The village's inhabitants speak Azerbaijani.

=== Population ===
At the time of the 2006 National Census, the village's population was 163 in 33 households. The following census in 2011 recorded 119 people in 33 households. The 2016 census measured the village's population at 90 people in 28 households.
