= Umaslan =

Umaslan or Umastan (Persian: اوماسلان) may refer to:

- Umaslan-e Olya
- Umaslan-e Sofla
