= Shilveh =

Shilveh (Persian: شيلوه), also rendered as Shelveh, may refer to:

- Shilveh-ye Olya
- Shilveh-ye Sofla
