= Damirchi-ye Sofla =

Village in Ardabil province, Iran

Damirchi-ye Sofla Persian: دميرچي سفلي
- Village
- Location within Iran
- Coordinates: 39°01′36″N 48°15′33″E
- Country: Iran
- Province: Ardabil
- County: Germi
- District: Muran
- Rural District: Ojarud-e Sharqi

Population (2016)
  - Total: 152
- Time zone: UTC+3:30 (IRST)

Damirchi-ye Sofla (Persian: دميرچي سفلي) (Note: Also romanized as Damīrchī-ye Soflá; also known as Damīrchelū-ye Soflá and Damīrchī-ye Pā’īn) is a village in Ojarud-e Sharqi Rural District of Muran District in Germi County, (Note: Formerly Moghan County) Ardabil province, Iran.

== Demographics ==
=== Population ===
At the time of the 2006 National Census, the village's population was 390 in 72 households. The following census in 2011 recorded 203 people in 53 households. The 2016 census measured the village's population at 152 people in 42 households.
