= Owch Aghaj =

Village in Ardabil province, Iran

Owch Aghaj Persian: اوچ اغاج
- Village
- Location within Iran
- Coordinates: 38°59′22″N 48°17′33″E
- Country: Iran
- Province: Ardabil
- County: Germi
- District: Muran
- Rural District: Ojarud-e Sharqi

Population (2016)
  - Total: 158
- Time zone: UTC+3:30 (IRST)

Owch Aghaj (Persian: اوچ اغاج) (Note: Also romanized as Owch Āghāj; also known as Owch Āqāch) is a village in Ojarud-e Sharqi Rural District of Muran District in Germi County, (Note: Formerly Moghan County) Ardabil province, Iran.

== Demographics ==
=== Population ===
At the time of the 2006 National Census, the village's population was 258 in 53 households. The following census in 2011 recorded 204 people in 50 households. The 2016 census measured the village's population at 158 people in 43 households.
