= Lajayer =

Village in Ardabil province, Iran

Lajayer Persian: لجاير
- Village
- Location within Iran
- Coordinates: 38°58′01″N 48°15′07″E
- Country: Iran
- Province: Ardabil
- County: Germi
- District: Muran
- Rural District: Ojarud-e Sharqi

Population (2016)
  - Total: 47
- Time zone: UTC+3:30 (IRST)

Lajayer (Persian: لجاير) (Note: Also romanized as Lajāyer) is a village in Ojarud-e Sharqi Rural District of Muran District in Germi County, (Note: Formerly Moghan County) Ardabil province, Iran.

== Demographics ==
=== Population ===
At the time of the 2006 National Census, the village's population was 63 in 14 households. The following census in 2011 recorded 39 people in 15 households. The 2016 census measured the village's population at 47 people in 15 households.
