= Ilkhanlar =

Village in Ardabil province, Iran

Ilkhanlar Persian: ايل خانلار
- Village
- Location within Iran
- Coordinates: 38°58′39″N 48°14′43″E
- Country: Iran
- Province: Ardabil
- County: Germi
- District: Muran
- Rural District: Ojarud-e Sharqi

Population (2016)
  - Total: 23
- Time zone: UTC+3:30 (IRST)

Ilkhanlar (Persian: ايل خانلار) (Note: Also romanized as Īlkhānlar and Īlkhānlār) is a village in Ojarud-e Sharqi Rural District of Muran District in Germi County, (Note: Formerly Moghan County) Ardabil province, Iran.

== Demographics ==
=== Population ===
At the time of the 2006 National Census, the village's population was 30 in six households. The following census in 2011 recorded 46 people in 13 households. The 2016 census measured the village's population at 23 people in eight households.
