= Kalan, Ardabil =

Village in Ardabil province, Iran

Kalan Persian: كلان
- Village
- Location within Iran
- Coordinates: 38°59′07″N 48°13′30″E
- Country: Iran
- Province: Ardabil
- County: Germi
- District: Muran
- Rural District: Ojarud-e Sharqi

Population (2016)
  - Total: 354
- Time zone: UTC+3:30 (IRST)

Kalan (Persian: كلان) (Note: Also romanized as Kalān)) is a village in Ojarud-e Sharqi Rural District of Muran District in Germi County, (Note: Formerly Moghan County) Ardabil province, Iran.

== Demographics ==
=== Population ===
At the time of the 2006 National Census, the village's population was 456 in 70 households. The following census in 2011 recorded 407 people in 90 households. The 2016 census measured the village's population at 354 people in 85 households.
