= Zangebar, Ardabil =

Village in Ardabil province, Iran

Zangebar Persian: زنگبار
- Village
- Location within Iran
- Coordinates: 39°02′57″N 48°13′55″E
- Country: Iran
- Province: Ardabil
- County: Germi
- District: Muran
- Rural District: Azadlu

Population (2016)
  - Total: 143
- Time zone: UTC+3:30 (IRST)

Zangebar (Persian: زنگبار) (Note: Also romanized as Zangabar, Zangebār, and Zangbār; also known as Zager, Zagra, and Zangīr) is a village in Azadlu Rural District of Muran District in Germi County, (Note: Formerly Moghan County) Ardabil province, Iran.

== Demographics ==
=== Population ===
At the time of the 2006 National Census, the village's population was 151 in 29 households. The following census in 2011 counted 118 people in 31 households. The 2016 census measured the population of the village as 143 people in 47 households.
