= Tamerdash =

Village in Ardabil province, Iran

Tamerdash Persian: تمرداش
- Village
- Location within Iran
- Coordinates: 39°00′57″N 48°17′16″E
- Country: Iran
- Province: Ardabil
- County: Germi
- District: Muran
- Rural District: Ojarud-e Sharqi

Population (2016)
  - Total: 51
- Time zone: UTC+3:30 (IRST)

Tamerdash (Persian: تمرداش) (Note: Also romanized as Tamerdāsh; also known as Tamīrdāsh and Tamīrtāsh) is a village in Ojarud-e Sharqi Rural District of Muran District in Germi County, (Note: Formerly Moghan County) Ardabil province, Iran.

== Demographics ==
=== Population ===
At the time of the 2006 National Census, the village's population was 40 in nine households. The following census in 2011 recorded 32 people in nine households. The 2016 census measured the village's population at 51 people in 17 households.
