= Baqerlu =

Village in Ardabil province, Iran

Baqerlu Persian: باقرلو
- Village
- Location within Iran
- Coordinates: 39°07′12″N 48°15′09″E
- Country: Iran
- Province: Ardabil
- County: Germi
- District: Muran
- Rural District: Azadlu

Population (2016)
  - Total: 74
- Time zone: UTC+3:30 (IRST)

Baqerlu (Persian: باقرلو) (Note: Also romanized as Bāqerlū) is a village in Azadlu Rural District of Muran District in Germi County, (Note: Formerly Moghan County) Ardabil province, Iran.

== Demographics ==
=== Population ===
At the time of the 2006 National Census, the village's population was 78 in 12 households. The following census in 2011 counted 71 people in 16 households. The 2016 census measured the population of the village as 74 people in 21 households.
