= Pileh Daraq =

Village in Ardabil province, Iran

Pileh Daraq Persian: پيله درق
- Village
- Location within Iran
- Coordinates: 39°01′06″N 48°15′00″E
- Country: Iran
- Province: Ardabil
- County: Germi
- District: Muran
- Rural District: Ojarud-e Sharqi

Population (2016)
  - Total: 69
- Time zone: UTC+3:30 (IRST)

Pileh Daraq (Persian: پيله درق) (Note: Also romanized as Pīleh Daraq; also known as Pīyeh Daraq) is a village in Ojarud-e Sharqi Rural District of Muran District in Germi County, (Note: Formerly Moghan County) Ardabil province, Iran.

== Demographics ==
=== Population ===
At the time of the 2006 National Census, the village's population was 126 in 22 households. The following census in 2011 recorded 92 people in 21 households. The 2016 census measured the village's population at 69 people in 21 households.
