= Eba Beyglu =

Village in Ardabil province, Iran

Eba Beyglu Persian: عبابيگلو
- Village
- Location within Iran
- Coordinates: 39°09′53″N 48°12′12″E
- Country: Iran
- Province: Ardabil
- County: Germi
- District: Muran
- Rural District: Azadlu

Population (2016)
  - Total: 274
- Time zone: UTC+3:30 (IRST)

Eba Beyglu (Persian: عبابيگلو) (Note: Also romanized as ‘Ebā Beyglū) is a village in Azadlu Rural District of Muran District in Germi County, (Note: Formerly Moghan County) Ardabil province, Iran.

== Demographics ==
=== Population ===
At the time of the 2006 National Census, the village's population was 322 in 68 households. The following census in 2011 counted 299 people in 82 households. The 2016 census measured the population of the village as 274 people in 86 households.
