= Yedi Daraq =

Village in Ardabil province, Iran

Yedi Daraq Persian: يدي درق
- Village
- Location within Iran
- Coordinates: 39°01′56″N 48°16′24″E
- Country: Iran
- Province: Ardabil
- County: Germi
- District: Muran
- Rural District: Ojarud-e Sharqi

Population (2016)
  - Total: 23
- Time zone: UTC+3:30 (IRST)

Yedi Daraq (Persian: يدي درق) (Note: Also romanized as Yedī Daraq) is a village in Ojarud-e Sharqi Rural District of Muran District in Germi County, (Note: Formerly Moghan County) Ardabil province, Iran.

== Demographics ==
=== Population ===
At the time of the 2006 National Census, the village's population was 41 in seven households. The following census in 2011 recorded 37 people in nine households. The 2016 census measured the village's population at 23 people in seven households.
