= Karimlu =

Village in Ardabil province, Iran

Karimlu Persian: كريملو
- Village
- Location within Iran
- Coordinates: 39°00′51″N 48°15′17″E
- Country: Iran
- Province: Ardabil
- County: Germi
- District: Muran
- Rural District: Ojarud-e Sharqi

Population (2016)
  - Total: 54
- Time zone: UTC+3:30 (IRST)

Karimlu (Persian: كريملو) (Note: Also romanized as Karīmlū; also known as Hamvār Kand) is a village in Ojarud-e Sharqi Rural District of Muran District in Germi County, (Note: Formerly Moghan County) Ardabil province, Iran.

== Demographics ==
=== Population ===
At the time of the 2006 National Census, the village's population was 86 in 14 households. The following census in 2011 recorded 71 people in 16 households. The 2016 census measured the village's population at 54 people in 18 households.
