= Vanestanaq =

Village in Ardabil province, Iran

Vanestanaq Persian: وانستانق
- Village
- Location within Iran
- Coordinates: 39°00′57″N 48°16′32″E
- Country: Iran
- Province: Ardabil
- County: Germi
- District: Muran
- Rural District: Ojarud-e Sharqi

Population (2016)
  - Total: 225
- Time zone: UTC+3:30 (IRST)

Vanestanaq (Persian: وانستانق) (Note: Also romanized as Vānestānaq; also known as Vanestānak) is a village in Ojarud-e Sharqi Rural District of Muran District in Germi County, (Note: Formerly Moghan County) Ardabil province, Iran.

== Demographics ==
=== Population ===
At the time of the 2006 National Census, the village's population was 229 in 51 households. The following census in 2011 recorded 173 people in 50 households. The 2016 census measured the village's population at 225 people in 64 households.
