= Darvish-e Gurnamaz =

Village in Ardabil province, Iran

Darvish-e Gurnamaz Persian: درويش گورنمز
- Village
- Location within Iran
- Coordinates: 39°03′50″N 48°15′06″E
- Country: Iran
- Province: Ardabil
- County: Germi
- District: Muran
- Rural District: Azadlu

Population (2016)
  - Total: 154
- Time zone: UTC+3:30 (IRST)

Darvish-e Gurnamaz (Persian: درويش گورنمز) (Note: Also romanized as Darvīsh-e Gūrnamāz; also known as Darvīsh Garīmaz and Darvish Gūrūnmaz) is a village in Azadlu Rural District of Muran District in Germi County, (Note: Formerly Moghan County) Ardabil province, Iran.

== Demographics ==
=== Population ===
At the time of the 2006 National Census, the village's population was 201 in 43 households. The following census in 2011 counted 144 people in 40 households. The 2016 census measured the population of the village as 154 people in 57 households.
