= Siah, Iran =

Village in Ardabil province, Iran

Siah Persian: سيه
- Village
- Location within Iran
- Coordinates: 38°57′45″N 48°13′06″E
- Country: Iran
- Province: Ardabil
- County: Germi
- District: Muran
- Rural District: Ojarud-e Sharqi

Population (2016)
  - Total: 12
- Time zone: UTC+3:30 (IRST)

Siah (Persian: سيه) (Note: Also romanized as Sīāh) is a village in Ojarud-e Sharqi Rural District of Muran District in Germi County, (Note: Formerly Moghan County) Ardabil province, Iran.

== Demographics ==
=== Population ===
At the time of the 2006 National Census, the village's population was 38 in seven households. The following census in 2011 recorded 26 people in nine households. The 2016 census measured the village's population at 12 people in four households.
