= Qarah Qeshlaq, Germi =

Village in Ardabil province, Iran

Qarah Qeshlaq Persian: قره قشلاق
- Village
- Location within Iran
- Coordinates: 39°07′18″N 48°16′02″E
- Country: Iran
- Province: Ardabil
- County: Germi
- District: Muran
- Rural District: Azadlu

Population (2016)
  - Total: 55
- Time zone: UTC+3:30 (IRST)

Qarah Qeshlaq (Persian: قره قشلاق) (Note: Also romanized as Qarah Qeshlāq) is a village in Azadlu Rural District of Muran District in Germi County, (Note: Formerly Moghan County) Ardabil province, Iran.

== Demographics ==
=== Population ===
At the time of the 2006 National Census, the village's population was 88 in 20 households. The following census in 2011 counted 62 people in 15 households. The 2016 census measured the population of the village as 55 people in 19 households.
