= Jan Gan =

Jan Gan or Jangan (Persian: جنگان) may refer to:

- Jangan, Ardabil
- Jan Gan, Hormozgan
