= Kalansura =

Village in Ardabil province, Iran

Kalansura Persian: كلانسورا
- Village
- Location within Iran
- Coordinates: 39°01′42″N 48°18′08″E
- Country: Iran
- Province: Ardabil
- County: Germi
- District: Muran
- Rural District: Ojarud-e Sharqi

Population (2016)
  - Total: 606
- Time zone: UTC+3:30 (IRST)

Kalansura (Persian: كلانسورا) (Note: Also romanized as Kalānsūrā; also known as Kalānsarā) is a village in Ojarud-e Sharqi Rural District of Muran District in Germi County, (Note: Formerly Moghan County) Ardabil province, Iran.

== Demographics ==
=== Population ===
At the time of the 2006 National Census, the village's population was 869 in 168 households. The following census in 2011 recorded 723 people in 175 households. The 2016 census measured the village's population at 606 people in 168 households. It was the most populous village in its rural district.
