= Van-e Sofla =

Village in Ardabil province, Iran

Van-e Sofla Persian: وان سفلي
- Village
- Location within Iran
- Coordinates: 39°00′17″N 48°17′51″E
- Country: Iran
- Province: Ardabil
- County: Germi
- District: Muran
- Rural District: Ojarud-e Sharqi

Population (2016)
  - Total: 264
- Time zone: UTC+3:30 (IRST)

Van-e Sofla (Persian: وان سفلي) (Note: Also romanized as Vān-e Soflá; also known as Vān-e Pā’īn) is a village in Ojarud-e Sharqi Rural DistrictOjarud-e Sharqi Rural District of Muran District in Germi County, (Note: Formerly Moghan County) Ardabil province, Iran.

== Demographics ==
=== Population ===
At the time of the 2006 National Census, the village's population was 352 in 70 households. The following census in 2011 recorded 313 people in 85 households. The 2016 census measured the village's population at 264 people in 81 households.
