= Van-e Olya =

Village in Ardabil province, Iran

Van-e Olya Persian: وان عليا
- Village
- Location within Iran
- Coordinates: 39°00′26″N 48°17′33″E
- Country: Iran
- Province: Ardabil
- County: Germi
- District: Muran
- Rural District: Ojarud-e Sharqi

Population (2016)
  - Total: 64
- Time zone: UTC+3:30 (IRST)

Van-e Olya (Persian: وان عليا) (Note: Also romanized as Vān-e ‘Olyā; also known as Vān and Vān-e Bālā) is a village in Ojarud-e Sharqi Rural District of Muran District in Germi County, (Note: Formerly Moghan County) Ardabil province, Iran.

== Demographics ==
=== Population ===
At the time of the 2006 National Census, the village's population was 97 in 23 households. The following census in 2011 recorded 75 people in 19 households. The 2016 census measured the village's population at 64 people in 22 households.
