= Azadlu =

Village in Ardabil province, Iran

Azadlu Persian: ازادلو
- Village
- Location within Iran
- Coordinates: 39°06′08″N 48°17′57″E
- Country: Iran
- Province: Ardabil
- County: Germi
- District: Muran
- Rural District: Azadlu

Population (2016)
  - Total: 293
- Time zone: UTC+3:30 (IRST)

Azadlu (Persian: ازادلو) (Note: Also romanized as Āzādlū; also known as Azārlū and Azatlu) is a village in, and the capital of, Azadlu Rural District in Muran District of Germi County, (Note: Formerly Moghan County) Ardabil province, Iran.

== Demographics ==
=== Population ===
At the time of the 2006 National Census, the village's population was 416 in 83 households. The following census in 2011 counted 377 people in 87 households. The 2016 census measured the population of the village as 293 people in 93 households.
