= Ali Verdilu =

Village in Ardabil province, Iran

Ali Verdilu Persian: علی وردیلو
- Village
- Location within Iran
- Coordinates: 39°00′15″N 48°16′15″E
- Country: Iran
- Province: Ardabil
- County: Germi
- District: Muran
- Rural District: Ojarud-e Sharqi

Population (2016)
  - Total: 21
- Time zone: UTC+3:30 (IRST)

Ali Verdilu (Persian: علی وردیلو) (Note: Also romanized as ‘Alī Verdlū; also known as Allāh Verdīlū) is a village in Ojarud-e Sharqi Rural District of Muran District in Germi County, (Note: Formerly Moghan County) Ardabil province, Iran.

== Demographics ==
=== Population ===
At the time of the 2006 National Census, the village's population was 33 in eight households. The following census in 2011 recorded 20 people in seven households. The 2016 census measured the village's population at 21 people in six households.
