= Owcheh =

Village in Ardabil province, Iran

Owcheh Persian: اوچه
- Village
- Location within Iran
- Coordinates: 38°57′38″N 48°13′56″E
- Country: Iran
- Province: Ardabil
- County: Germi
- District: Muran
- Rural District: Ojarud-e Sharqi

Population (2016)
  - Total: 23
- Time zone: UTC+3:30 (IRST)

Owcheh (Persian: اوچه) (Note: Also romanized as Ucheh and Ūcheh) is a village in Ojarud-e Sharqi Rural District of Muran District in Germi County, (Note: Formerly Moghan County) Ardabil province, Iran.

== Demographics ==
=== Population ===
At the time of the 2006 National Census, the village's population was 67 in 12 households. The following census in 2011 recorded 44 people in 13 households. The 2016 census measured the village's population at 23 people in six households.
