= Akbarabad, Ardabil =

Village in Ardabil province, Iran

Akbarabad Persian: اكبراباد
- Village
- Location within Iran
- Coordinates: 39°07′37″N 48°13′53″E
- Country: Iran
- Province: Ardabil
- County: Germi
- District: Muran
- Rural District: Azadlu

Population (2016)
  - Total: 246
- Time zone: UTC+3:30 (IRST)

Akbarabad (Persian: اكبراباد) (Note: Also romanized as Akbarābād; also known as Boyūk Āqā (بیوک آقا) and Boyūk Āqālū (بیوک آقالو)) is a village in Azadlu Rural District of Muran District in Germi County, (Note: Formerly Moghan County) Ardabil province, Iran.

== Demographics ==
=== Population ===
At the time of the 2006 National Census, the village's population was 189 in 36 households. The following census in 2011 counted 177 people in 43 households. The 2016 census measured the population of the village as 246 people in 76 households.
