= Mehdi Khanlu =

Village in Ardabil province, Iran

Mehdi Khanlu Persian: مهدي خانلو
- Village
- Location within Iran
- Coordinates: 39°07′00″N 48°16′42″E
- Country: Iran
- Province: Ardabil
- County: Germi
- District: Muran
- Rural District: Azadlu

Population (2016)
  - Total: 18
- Time zone: UTC+3:30 (IRST)

Mehdi Khanlu (Persian: مهدي خانلو) (Note: Also romanized as Mehdī Khānlū) is a village in Azadlu Rural District of Muran District in Germi County, (Note: Formerly Moghan County) Ardabil province, Iran.

== Demographics ==
=== Population ===
At the time of the 2006 National Census, the village's population was 40 in six households. The following census in 2011 counted 30 people in five households. The 2016 census measured the population of the village as 18 people in five households.
