= Kamar Qayah =

Village in Ardabil province, Iran

Kamar Qayah Persian: كمرقيه
- Village
- Location within Iran
- Coordinates: 39°08′33″N 48°13′25″E
- Country: Iran
- Province: Ardabil
- County: Germi
- District: Muran
- Rural District: Azadlu

Population (2016)
  - Total: 172
- Time zone: UTC+3:30 (IRST)

Kamar Qayah (Persian: كمرقيه) (Note: Also romanized as Kamar Qayyah; also known as Qūrt Dū) is a village in Azadlu Rural District of Muran District in Germi County, (Note: Formerly Moghan County) Ardabil province, Iran.

== Demographics ==
=== Population ===
At the time of the 2006 National Census, the village's population was 227 in 42 households. The following census in 2011 counted 169 people in 46 households. The 2016 census measured the population of the village as 172 people in 52 households.
