= Salaleh =

Village in Ardabil province, Iran

Salaleh Persian: سلاله
- Village
- Location within Iran
- Coordinates: 39°03′00″N 48°16′09″E
- Country: Iran
- Province: Ardabil
- County: Germi
- District: Muran
- Rural District: Azadlu

Population (2016)
  - Total: 202
- Time zone: UTC+3:30 (IRST)

Salaleh (Persian: سلاله) (Note: Also romanized as Salāleh; also known as Shalūh) is a village in Azadlu Rural District of Muran District in Germi County, (Note: Formerly Moghan County) Ardabil province, Iran.

== Demographics ==
=== Population ===
At the time of the 2006 National Census, the village's population was 318 in 70 households. The following census in 2011 counted 254 people in 61 households. The 2016 census measured the population of the village as 202 people in 69 households.
