= Sineh Sar =

Village in Ardabil province, Iran

Sineh Sar Persian: سينه سر
- Village
- Location within Iran
- Coordinates: 39°03′02″N 48°10′40″E
- Country: Iran
- Province: Ardabil
- County: Germi
- District: Muran
- Rural District: Ojarud-e Sharqi

Population (2016)
  - Total: 40
- Time zone: UTC+3:30 (IRST)

Sineh Sar (Persian: سينه سر) (Note: Also romanized as Sīneh Sar) is a village in Ojarud-e Sharqi Rural District of Muran District in Germi County, (Note: Formerly Moghan County) Ardabil province, Iran.

== Demographics ==
=== Population ===
At the time of the 2006 National Census, the village's population was 72 in 15 households. The following census in 2011 recorded 51 people in 12 households. The 2016 census measured the village's population at 40 people in 14 households.
