= Hadi Beyglu =

Village in Ardabil province, Iran

Hadi Beyglu Persian: هادي بيگلو
- Village
- Location within Iran
- Coordinates: 39°11′34″N 48°09′19″E
- Country: Iran
- Province: Ardabil
- County: Germi
- District: Muran
- Rural District: Azadlu

Population (2016)
  - Total: 98
- Time zone: UTC+3:30 (IRST)

Hadi Beyglu (Persian: هادي بيگلو) (Note: Also romanized as Hādī Beyglū) is a village in Azadlu Rural District of Muran District in Germi County, (Note: Formerly Moghan County) Ardabil province, Iran.

== Demographics ==
=== Population ===
At the time of the 2006 National Census, the village's population was 137 in 27 households. The following census in 2011 counted 120 people in 32 households. The 2016 census measured the population of the village as 98 people in 31 households.
