= Orujabad =

Village in Ardabil province, Iran

Orujabad Persian: اروج اباد
- Village
- Location within Iran
- Coordinates: 39°04′30″N 48°16′13″E
- Country: Iran
- Province: Ardabil
- County: Germi
- District: Muran
- Rural District: Azadlu

Population (2016)
  - Total: 303
- Time zone: UTC+3:30 (IRST)

Orujabad (Persian: اروج اباد) (Note: Also romanized as Orūjābād; also known as Owchābād) is a village in Azadlu Rural District of Muran District in Germi County, (Note: Formerly Moghan County) Ardabil province, Iran.

== Demographics ==
=== Population ===
At the time of the 2006 National Census, the village's population was 47 in nine households. The following census in 2011 counted 44 people in nine households. The 2016 census measured the population of the village as 54 people in 14 households.
