= Yal Dagarmani =

Village in Ardabil province, Iran

Yal Dagarmani Persian: يل دگرماني
- Village
- Location within Iran
- Coordinates: 39°02′03″N 48°13′52″E
- Country: Iran
- Province: Ardabil
- County: Germi
- District: Muran
- Rural District: Ojarud-e Sharqi

Population (2016)
  - Total: 152
- Time zone: UTC+3:30 (IRST)

Yal Dagarmani (Persian: يل دگرماني) (Note: Also romanized as Yal Dagarmānī; also known as Takleh, Yal Dagīrmānī, and Yaldakarmānī) is a village in Ojarud-e Sharqi Rural District of Muran District in Germi County, (Note: Formerly Moghan County) Ardabil province, Iran.

== Demographics ==
=== Population ===
At the time of the 2006 National Census, the village's population was 224 in 43 households. The following census in 2011 recorded 169 people in 42 households. The 2016 census measured the village's population at 152 people in 38 households.
