= Damirchi-ye Olya =

Village in Ardabil province, Iran

Damirchi-ye Olya Persian: دميرچي عليا
- Village
- Location within Iran
- Coordinates: 39°01′20″N 48°15′40″E
- Country: Iran
- Province: Ardabil
- County: Germi
- District: Muran
- Rural District: Ojarud-e Sharqi

Population (2016)
  - Total: 101
- Time zone: UTC+3:30 (IRST)

Damirchi-ye Olya (Persian: دميرچي عليا) (Note: Also romanized as Damīrchī-ye 'Olyā; also known as Damīr Chelū, Damīr Cholū, Damīrchelū-ye 'Olyā, Damirchilu, and Damīrchī-ye Bālā) is a village in Ojarud-e Sharqi Rural District of Muran District in Germi County, (Note: Formerly Moghan County) Ardabil province, Iran.

== Demographics ==
=== Population ===
At the time of the 2006 National Census, the village's population was 78 in 14 households. The following census in 2011 recorded 63 people in 18 households. The 2016 census measured the village's population at 101 people in 31 households.
