= Qeshlaq-e Quzlu =

Village in Ardabil province, Iran

Qeshlaq-e Quzlu Persian: قشلاق قوزلو
- Village
- Location within Iran
- Coordinates: 39°10′56″N 48°10′04″E
- Country: Iran
- Province: Ardabil
- County: Germi
- District: Muran
- Rural District: Azadlu

Population (2016)
  - Total: 105
- Time zone: UTC+3:30 (IRST)

Qeshlaq-e Quzlu (Persian: قشلاق قوزلو) (Note: Also romanized as Qeshlāq-e Qūzlū; also known as Qūrī Daraq) is a village in Azadlu Rural District of Muran District in Germi County, (Note: Formerly Moghan County) Ardabil province, Iran.

== Demographics ==
=== Population ===
At the time of the 2006 National Census, the village's population was 112 in 17 households. The following census in 2011 counted 105 people in 24 households. The 2016 census measured the population of the village as 105 people in 28 households.
