= Aqa Hasan Beyglu =

Village in Ardabil province, Iran

Aqa Hasan Beyglu Persian: اقاحسن بيگلو
- Village
- Location within Iran
- Coordinates: 39°10′38″N 48°10′49″E
- Country: Iran
- Province: Ardabil
- County: Germi
- District: Muran
- Rural District: Azadlu

Population (2016)
  - Total: 124
- Time zone: UTC+3:30 (IRST)

Aqa Hasan Beyglu (Persian: اقاحسن بيگلو) (Note: Also romanized as Āqā Ḩasan Beyglū) is a village in Azadlu Rural District of Muran District in Germi County, (Note: Formerly Moghan County) Ardabil province, Iran.

== Demographics ==
=== Population ===
At the time of the 2006 National Census, the village's population was 215 in 38 households. The following census in 2011 counted 159 people in 33 households. The 2016 census measured the population of the village as 124 people in 34 households.
