= Tappeh Bashi, Ardabil =

Village in Ardabil province, Iran

Tappeh Bashi Persian: تپه باشی
- Village
- Location within Iran
- Coordinates: 39°08′01″N 48°13′40″E
- Country: Iran
- Province: Ardabil
- County: Germi
- District: Muran
- Rural District: Azadlu

Population (2016)
  - Total: 91
- Time zone: UTC+3:30 (IRST)

Tappeh Bashi (Persian: تپه باشی) (Note: Also romanized as Tappeh Bāshī) is a village in Azadlu Rural District of Muran District in Germi County, (Note: Formerly Moghan County) Ardabil province, Iran.

== Demographics ==
=== Population ===
At the time of the 2006 National Census, the village's population was 110 in 22 households. The following census in 2011 counted 78 people in 25 households. The 2016 census measured the population of the village as 91 people in 31 households.
