= Samadlu =

Village in Ardabil province, Iran

Samadlu Persian: صمدلو
- Village
- Location within Iran
- Coordinates: 39°10′22″N 48°11′19″E
- Country: Iran
- Province: Ardabil
- County: Germi
- District: Muran
- Rural District: Azadlu

Population (2016)
  - Total: 131
- Time zone: UTC+3:30 (IRST)

Samadlu (Persian: صمدلو) (Note: Also romanized as Şamadlū; also known as Līt Valī Qeshlāqī) is a village in Azadlu Rural District of Muran District in Germi County, (Note: Formerly Moghan County) Ardabil province, Iran.

== Demographics ==
=== Population ===
At the time of the 2006 National Census, the village's population was 148 in 28 households. The following census in 2011 counted 120 people in 27 households. The 2016 census measured the population of the village as 131 people in 41 households.
