= Jangan =

Jangan may refer to:

- Chang'an, China
- Jan Gan (disambiguation), places in Iran
