= Hachakand =

Hachakand (Persian: هاچاكند) may refer to:

- Hachakand-e Darmanlu
- Hachakand-e Tazeh
