= Rahimlui-ye Muran =

Village in Ardabil province, Iran

Rahimlui-ye Muran Persian: رحيملوي موران
- Village
- Location within Iran
- Coordinates: 39°03′31″N 48°19′10″E
- Country: Iran
- Province: Ardabil
- County: Germi
- District: Muran
- Rural District: Azadlu

Population (2016)
  - Total: 105
- Time zone: UTC+3:30 (IRST)

Rahimlui-ye Muran (Persian: رحيملوي موران) (Note: Also romanized as Raḩīmlūī-ye Mūrān; also known as Raḩīmlū-ye Mūrān) is a village in Azadlu Rural District of Muran District in Germi County, (Note: Formerly Moghan County) Ardabil province, Iran.

== Demographics ==
=== Population ===
At the time of the 2006 National Census, the village's population was 149 in 36 households. The following census in 2011 counted 130 people in 37 households. The 2016 census measured the population of the village as 105 people in 35 households.
