= Pireh Khalil =

Village in Ardabil province, Iran

Pireh Khalil Persian: پيره خليل
- Village
- Location within Iran
- Coordinates: 39°01′09″N 48°18′45″E
- Country: Iran
- Province: Ardabil
- County: Germi
- District: Muran
- Rural District: Ojarud-e Sharqi

Population (2016)
  - Total: 100
- Time zone: UTC+3:30 (IRST)

Pireh Khalil (Persian: پيره خليل) (Note: Also romanized as Pīreh Khalīl; also known as Pīr-e Khalīl) is a village in Ojarud-e Sharqi Rural District of Muran District in Germi County, (Note: Formerly Moghan County) Ardabil province, Iran.

== Demographics ==
=== Population ===
At the time of the 2006 National Census, the village's population was 216 in 41 households. The following census in 2011 recorded 133 people in 36 households. The 2016 census measured the village's population at 100 people in 33 households.
