= Darmanlu =

Village in Ardabil province, Iran

Darmanlu Persian: درمانلو
- Village
- Location within Iran
- Coordinates: 39°02′07″N 48°12′17″E
- Country: Iran
- Province: Ardabil
- County: Germi
- District: Muran
- Rural District: Ojarud-e Sharqi

Population (2016)
  - Total: 508
- Time zone: UTC+3:30 (IRST)

Darmanlu (Persian: درمانلو) (Note: Also romanized as Darmānlū) is a village in Ojarud-e Sharqi Rural District of Muran District in Germi County, (Note: Formerly Moghan County) Ardabil province, Iran.

== Demographics ==
=== Population ===
At the time of the 2006 National Census, the village's population was 633 in 121 households. The following census in 2011 recorded 649 people in 142 households. The 2016 census measured the village's population at 508 people in 144 households.
