= Afsuran =

Village in Ardabil province, Iran

Afsuran Persian: افسوران
- Village
- Location within Iran
- Coordinates: 38°59′36″N 48°14′34″E
- Country: Iran
- Province: Ardabil
- County: Germi
- District: Muran
- Rural District: Ojarud-e Sharqi

Population (2016)
  - Total: 337
- Time zone: UTC+3:30 (IRST)

Afsuran (Persian: افسوران) (Note: Also romanized as Afsūrān) is a village in Ojarud-e Sharqi Rural District of Muran District in Germi County, (Note: Formerly Moghan County) Ardabil province, Iran.

== Demographics ==
=== Population ===
At the time of the 2006 National Census, the village's population was 300 in 61 households. The following census in 2011 recorded 212 people in 58 households. The 2016 census measured the village's population at 337 people in 90 households.
