= Seyyedlar-e Zahra =

Village in Ardabil province, Iran

Seyyedlar-e Zahra Persian: سيدلرزهرا
- Village
- Location within Iran
- Coordinates: 39°02′36″N 48°17′50″E
- Country: Iran
- Province: Ardabil
- County: Germi
- District: Muran
- Rural District: Ojarud-e Sharqi

Population (2016)
  - Total: 63
- Time zone: UTC+3:30 (IRST)

Seyyedlar-e Zahra (Persian: سيدلرزهرا) (Note: Also romanized as Seyyedlar-e Zahrā; also known as Mūrān and Seyyedlar-e Mūrān) is a village in Ojarud-e Sharqi Rural District of Muran District in Germi County, (Note: Formerly Moghan County) Ardabil province, Iran.

== Demographics ==
=== Population ===
At the time of the 2006 National Census, the village's population was 89 in 20 households. The following census in 2011 recorded 63 people in 18 households. The 2016 census measured the village's population at 63 people in 25 households.
