= Owrta Qeshlaq =

Village in Ardabil province, Iran

Owrta Qeshlaq Persian: اورتاقشلاق
- Village
- Location within Iran
- Coordinates: 39°10′39″N 48°08′29″E
- Country: Iran
- Province: Ardabil
- County: Germi
- District: Muran
- Rural District: Azadlu

Population (2016)
  - Total: 39
- Time zone: UTC+3:30 (IRST)

Owrta Qeshlaq (Persian: اورتاقشلاق) (Note: Also romanized as Owrtā Qeshlāq; also known as Owrtā Qeshlāq-e Īlkhchī (اورتاقشلاق ايلخچي)) is a village in Azadlu Rural District of Muran District in Germi County, (Note: Formerly Moghan County) Ardabil province, Iran.

== Demographics ==
=== Population ===
At the time of the 2006 National Census, the village's population was 34 in six households. The following census in 2011 counted 30 people in six households. The 2016 census measured the population of the village as 39 people in 10 households.
