= Mohreh =

Village in Ardabil province, Iran

Mohreh Persian: مهره
- Village
- Location within Iran
- Coordinates: 39°01′36″N 48°14′34″E
- Country: Iran
- Province: Ardabil
- County: Germi
- District: Muran
- Rural District: Ojarud-e Sharqi

Population (2016)
  - Total: 168
- Time zone: UTC+3:30 (IRST)

Mohreh (Persian: مهره) is a village in Ojarud-e Sharqi Rural District of Muran District in Germi County, (Note: Formerly Moghan County) Ardabil province, Iran.

== Demographics ==
=== Population ===
At the time of the 2006 National Census, the village's population was 323 in 66 households. The following census in 2011 recorded 208 people in 60 households. The 2016 census measured the village's population at 168 people in 57 households.
