= Darin Kabud =

Village in Ardabil province, Iran

Darin Kabud Persian: درين كبود
- Village
- Location within Iran
- Coordinates: 39°04′14″N 48°16′29″E
- Country: Iran
- Province: Ardabil
- County: Germi
- District: Muran
- Rural District: Azadlu

Population (2016)
  - Total: 163
- Time zone: UTC+3:30 (IRST)

Darin Kabud (Persian: درين كبود) (Note: Also romanized as Darīn Kabūd) is a village in Azadlu Rural District of Muran District in Germi County, (Note: Formerly Moghan County) Ardabil province, Iran.

== Demographics ==
=== Population ===
At the time of the 2006 National Census, the village's population was 137 in 24 households. The following census in 2011 counted 122 people in 28 households. The 2016 census measured the population of the village as 163 people in 45 households.
