= Pormehr =

Village in Ardabil province, Iran

Pormehr Persian: پرمهر
- Village
- Location within Iran
- Coordinates: 39°00′11″N 48°14′24″E
- Country: Iran
- Province: Ardabil
- County: Germi
- District: Muran
- Rural District: Ojarud-e Sharqi

Population (2016)
  - Total: 361
- Time zone: UTC+3:30 (IRST)

Pormehr (Persian: پرمهر) (Note: Also known as Parmehr) is a village in Ojarud-e Sharqi Rural District of Muran District in Germi County, (Note: Formerly Moghan County) Ardabil province, Iran.

== Demographics ==
=== Population ===
At the time of the 2006 National Census, the village's population was 558 in 136 households. The following census in 2011 recorded 447 people in 129 households. The 2016 census measured the village's population at 361 people in 119 households.
