= Tazeh Kand-e Muran =

Village in Ardabil province, Iran

Tazeh Kand-e Muran Persian: تازه كندموران
- Village
- Location within Iran
- Coordinates: 39°02′15″N 48°17′14″E
- Country: Iran
- Province: Ardabil
- County: Germi
- District: Muran
- Rural District: Ojarud-e Sharqi

Population (2016)
  - Total: 102
- Time zone: UTC+3:30 (IRST)

Tazeh Kand-e Muran (Persian: تازه كندموران) (Note: Also romanized as Tāzeh Kand-e Mūrān; also known as Tazeh Kand, Tāzeh Kand-e Zahrā, and Tāzeh Kandeh-ye Zahrā) is a village in Ojarud-e Sharqi Rural District of Muran District in Germi County, (Note: Formerly Moghan County) Ardabil province, Iran.

== Demographics ==
=== Population ===
At the time of the 2006 National Census, the village's population was 125 in 27 households. The following census in 2011 recorded 99 people in 28 households. The 2016 census measured the village's population at 102 people in 29 households.
