= Hameh Shan =

Village in Ardabil province, Iran

Hameh Shan Persian: همه شان
- Village
- Location within Iran
- Coordinates: 39°02′35″N 48°19′52″E
- Country: Iran
- Province: Ardabil
- County: Germi
- District: Muran
- Rural District: Ojarud-e Sharqi

Population (2016)
  - Total: 82
- Time zone: UTC+3:30 (IRST)

Hameh Shan (Persian: همه شان) (Note: Also romanized as Hameh Shān) is a village in Ojarud-e Sharqi Rural District of Muran District in Germi County, (Note: Formerly Moghan County) Ardabil province, Iran.

== Demographics ==
=== Population ===
At the time of the 2006 National Census, the village's population was 157 in 36 households. The following census in 2011 recorded 137 people in 34 households. The 2016 census measured the village's population at 82 people in 25 households.
