= Kulatan =

Village in Ardabil province, Iran

Kulatan Persian: كولاتان
- Village
- Location within Iran
- Coordinates: 38°58′20″N 48°14′01″E
- Country: Iran
- Province: Ardabil
- County: Germi
- District: Muran
- Rural District: Ojarud-e Sharqi

Population (2016)
  - Total: 44
- Time zone: UTC+3:30 (IRST)

Kulatan (Persian: كولاتان) (Note: Also romanized as Kūlātān) is a village in Ojarud-e Sharqi Rural District of Muran District in Germi County, (Note: Formerly Moghan County) Ardabil province, Iran.

== Demographics ==
=== Population ===
At the time of the 2006 National Census, the village's population was 42 in nine households. The following census in 2011 recorded 39 people in eight households. The 2016 census measured the village's population at 44 people in 13 households.
