= Siavosh =

Siavosh (Persian: سياوش) may refer to:

- Siavosh, Ardabil
- Siavosh, Lorestan
- Siavosh, Tarighi
- Siavosh Kandi
- Siyâvash, a character in the Shahnameh epic
