= Kord Lar, Ardabil =

Village in Ardabil province, Iran

Kord Lar Persian: كردلر
- Village
- Location within Iran
- Coordinates: 39°03′34″N 48°17′38″E
- Country: Iran
- Province: Ardabil
- County: Germi
- District: Muran
- Rural District: Azadlu

Population (2016)
  - Total: 397
- Time zone: UTC+3:30 (IRST)

Kord Lar (Persian: كردلر) is a village in Azadlu Rural District of Muran District in Germi County, (Note: Formerly Moghan County) Ardabil province, Iran.

== Demographics ==
=== Population ===
At the time of the 2006 National Census, the village's population was 511 in 103 households. The following census in 2011 counted 444 people in 104 households. The 2016 census measured the population of the village as 397 people in 125 households.
