= Hachakand-e Darmanlu =

Village in Ardabil province, Iran

Hachakand-e Darmanlu Persian: هاچاكنددرمانلو
- Village
- Location within Iran
- Coordinates: 39°03′30″N 48°11′33″E
- Country: Iran
- Province: Ardabil
- County: Germi
- District: Muran
- Rural District: Ojarud-e Sharqi

Population (2016)
  - Total: 496
- Time zone: UTC+3:30 (IRST)

Hachakand-e Darmanlu (Persian: هاچاكنددرمانلو) (Note: Also romanized as Hāchākand-e Darmānlū) is a village in Ojarud-e Sharqi Rural District of Muran District in Germi County, (Note: Formerly Moghan County) Ardabil province, Iran.

== Demographics ==
=== Population ===
As of the most recent census, in 2016, the village's population was measured at 496 people in 129 households.

At the time of the 2006 National Census, the village's population was 643 in 130 households. The following census in 2011 recorded 757 people in 168 households.
