= Umaslan-e Olya =

Village in Ardabil province, Iran

Umaslan-e Olya Persian: اوماسلان عليا
- Village
- Location within Iran
- Coordinates: 38°58′29″N 48°15′23″E
- Country: Iran
- Province: Ardabil
- County: Germi
- District: Muran
- Rural District: Ojarud-e Sharqi

Population (2016)
  - Total: 360
- Time zone: UTC+3:30 (IRST)

Umaslan-e Olya (Persian: اوماسلان عليا) (Note: Also romanized as Ūmāslān-e ‘Olyā; also known as Ūmāslān and Ūmāstān) is a village in Ojarud-e Sharqi Rural District of Muran District in Germi County, (Note: Formerly Moghan County) Ardabil province, Iran.

== Demographics ==
=== Population ===
At the time of the 2006 National Census, the village's population was 415 in 79 households. The following census in 2011 recorded 354 people in 91 households. The 2016 census measured the village's population at 360 people in 106 households.
