= Azadlu Rural District =

Rural district in Ardabil province, Iran

Azadlu Rural District Persian: دهستان آزادلو
- Rural District
- Location within Iran
- Coordinates: 39°07′N 48°14′E
- Country: Iran
- Province: Ardabil
- County: Germi
- District: Muran
- Established: 2001
- Capital: Azadlu

Population (2016)
  - Total: 3,855
- Time zone: UTC+3:30 (IRST)

Azadlu Rural District (Persian: دهستان آزادلو) is in Muran District of Germi County, (Note: Formerly Moghan County) Ardabil province, Iran. Its capital is the village of Azadlu.

== Demographics ==
=== Population ===
At the time of the 2006 National Census, the rural district's population was 4,720 in 912 households. There were 4,197 inhabitants in 1,002 households at the following census of 2011. The 2016 census measured the population of the rural district as 3,855 in 1,181 households. The most populous of its 24 villages was Parchin-e Sofla, with 532 people.

=== Other villages in the rural district ===
- Akbarabad
- Aqa Hasan Beyglu
- Baqerlu
- Darin Kabud
- Darvish-e Gurnamaz
- Eba Beyglu
- Hadi Beyglu
- Kamar Qayah
- Kord Lar
- Mehdi Khanlu
- Orujabad
- Owrta Qeshlaq
- Parchin-e Olya
- Qarah Qeshlaq
- Qeshlaq-e Ilkhchi-ye Olya
- Qeshlaq-e Ilkhchi-ye Sofla
- Qeshlaq-e Quzlu
- Rahimlui-ye Muran
- Salaleh
- Samadlu
- Tappeh Bashi
- Zangebar
