= Qeshlaq-e Ilkhchi-ye Sofla =

Village in Ardabil province, Iran

Qeshlaq-e Ilkhchi-ye Sofla Persian: قشلاق ايلخچي سفلي
- Village
- Location within Iran
- Coordinates: 39°10′46″N 48°08′36″E
- Country: Iran
- Province: Ardabil
- County: Germi
- District: Muran
- Rural District: Azadlu

Population (2016)
  - Total: 39
- Time zone: UTC+3:30 (IRST)

Qeshlaq-e Ilkhchi-ye Sofla (Persian: قشلاق ايلخچي سفلي) (Note: Also romanized as Qeshlāq-e Īlkhchī-ye Soflá; also known as Īlkhchīh-ye Pā’īn and Qeshlāq-e Īlchī-ye Soflá) is a village in Azadlu Rural District of Muran District in Germi County, (Note: Formerly Moghan County) Ardabil province, Iran.

== Demographics ==
=== Population ===
At the time of the 2006 National Census, the village's population was 60 in 10 households. The following census in 2011 counted 50 people in 11 households. The 2016 census measured the population of the village as 39 people in seven households.
