= Jangan, Ardabil =

Village in Ardabil province, Iran

Jangan Persian: جنگان
- Village
- Location within Iran
- Coordinates: 39°00′06″N 48°15′51″E
- Country: Iran
- Province: Ardabil
- County: Germi
- District: Muran
- Rural District: Ojarud-e Sharqi

Population (2016)
  - Total: 79
- Time zone: UTC+3:30 (IRST)

Jangan (Persian: جنگان) (Note: Also romanized as Jangān; also known as Changān) is a village in Ojarud-e Sharqi Rural District of Muran District in Germi County, (Note: Formerly Moghan County) Ardabil province, Iran.

== Demographics ==
=== Population ===
At the time of the 2006 National Census, the village's population was 105 in 21 households. The following census in 2011 recorded 86 people in 20 households. The 2016 census measured the village's population at 79 people in 27 households.
