= Shilveh-ye Sofla =

Village in Ardabil province, Iran

Shilveh-ye Sofla Persian: شيلوه سفلي
- Village
- Location within Iran
- Coordinates: 39°02′28″N 48°13′13″E
- Country: Iran
- Province: Ardabil
- County: Germi
- District: Muran
- Rural District: Ojarud-e Sharqi

Population (2016)
  - Total: 92
- Time zone: UTC+3:30 (IRST)

Shilveh-ye Sofla (Persian: شيلوه سفلي) (Note: Also romanized as Shīlveh-ye Soflá; also known as Shelveh-ye Soflá and Shīlveh-ye Pā’īn) is a village in Ojarud-e Sharqi Rural District of Muran District in Germi County, (Note: Formerly Moghan County) Ardabil province, Iran.

== Demographics ==
=== Population ===
At the time of the 2006 National Census, the village's population was 117 in 22 households. The following census in 2011 recorded 72 people in 17 households. The 2016 census measured the village's population at 92 people in 24 households.
