= Burkabad, Ardabil =

Village in Ardabil province, Iran

Burkabad Persian: بورك اباد
- Village
- Location within Iran
- Coordinates: 38°58′13″N 48°13′34″E
- Country: Iran
- Province: Ardabil
- County: Germi
- District: Muran
- Rural District: Ojarud-e Sharqi

Population (2016)
  - Total: 29
- Time zone: UTC+3:30 (IRST)

Burkabad (Persian: بورك اباد) (Note: Also romanized as Būrkābād; also known as Borūkābād) is a village in Ojarud-e Sharqi Rural District of Muran District in Germi County, (Note: Formerly Moghan County) Ardabil province, Iran.

== Demographics ==
=== Population ===
At the time of the 2006 National Census, the village's population was 34 in six households. The following census in 2011 recorded 26 people in seven households. The 2016 census measured the village's population at 29 people in nine households.
