= Parchin-e Sofla =

Village in Ardabil province, Iran

Parchin-e Sofla Persian: پرچين سفلي
- Village
- Location within Iran
- Coordinates: 39°05′05″N 48°14′14″E
- Country: Iran
- Province: Ardabil
- County: Germi
- District: Muran
- Rural District: Azadlu

Population (2016)
  - Total: 532
- Time zone: UTC+3:30 (IRST)

Parchin-e Sofla (Persian: پرچين سفلي) (Note: Also romanized as Parchīn-e Soflá; also known as Parchīn-e Pā’īn) is a village in Azadlu Rural District of Muran District in Germi County, (Note: Formerly Moghan County) Ardabil province, Iran.

== Demographics ==
=== Population ===
At the time of the 2006 National Census, the village's population was 605 in 114 households. The following census in 2011 counted 723 people in 147 households. The 2016 census measured the population of the village as 532 people in 151 households. It was the most populous village in its rural district.
