= Parchin-e Olya =

Village in Ardabil province, Iran

Parchin-e Olya Persian: پرچين سفلي
- Village
- Location within Iran
- Coordinates: 39°04′20″N 48°13′30″E
- Country: Iran
- Province: Ardabil
- County: Germi
- District: Muran
- Rural District: Azadlu

Population (2016)
  - Total: 303
- Time zone: UTC+3:30 (IRST)

Parchin-e Olya (Persian: پرچين عليا) (Note: Also romanized as Parchīn-e ‘Olyā; also known as Parchīn-e Bālā) is a village in Azadlu Rural District of Muran District in Germi County, (Note: Formerly Moghan County) Ardabil province, Iran.

== Demographics ==
=== Population ===
At the time of the 2006 National Census, the village's population was 345 in 54 households. The following census in 2011 counted 306 people in 77 households. The 2016 census measured the population of the village as 303 people in 51 households.
