= Shilveh-ye Olya =

Village in Ardabil province, Iran

Shilveh-ye Olya Persian: شيلوه عليا
- Village
- Location within Iran
- Coordinates: 39°02′09″N 48°12′41″E
- Country: Iran
- Province: Ardabil
- County: Germi
- District: Muran
- Rural District: Ojarud-e Sharqi

Population (2016)
  - Total: 217
- Time zone: UTC+3:30 (IRST)

Shilveh-ye Olya (Persian: شيلوه عليا) (Note: Also romanized as Shīlveh-ye ‘Olyā; also known as Shelveh-ye ‘Olyā, Shilveh, and Shīlveh-ye Bālā) is a village in Ojarud-e Sharqi Rural District of Muran District in Germi County, (Note: Formerly Moghan County) Ardabil province, Iran.

== Demographics ==
=== Population ===
At the time of the 2006 National Census, the village's population was 268 in 52 households. The following census in 2011 recorded 236 people in 50 households. The 2016 census measured the village's population at 217 people in 61 households.
