= Ojarud-e Sharqi Rural District =

Rural district in Ardabil province, Iran

Ojarud-e Sharqi Rural District Persian: دهستان اجارود شرقی
- Rural District
- Location within Iran
- Coordinates: 39°01′N 48°15′E
- Country: Iran
- Province: Ardabil
- County: Germi
- District: Muran
- Established: 1987
- Capital: Zahra

Population (2016)
  - Total: 6,164
- Time zone: UTC+3:30 (IRST)

Ojarud-e Sharqi Rural District (Persian: دهستان اجارود شرقی) is in Muran District of Germi County, (Note: Formerly Moghan County) Ardabil province, Iran. It is administered from the city of Zahra.

== Demographics ==
=== Population ===
At the time of the 2006 National Census, the rural district's population was 8,244 in 1,644 households. There were 6,927 inhabitants in 1,721 households at the following census of 2011. The 2016 census measured the population of the rural district as 6,164 in 1,750 households. The most populous of its 39 villages was Kalansura, with 606 people.

=== Other villages in the rural district ===
- Afsuran
- Ali Verdilu
- Burkabad
- Damirchi-ye Olya
- Damirchi-ye Sofla
- Darmanlu
- Hachakand-e Darmanlu
- Hameh Shan
- Ilkhanlar
- Jangan
- Kalan
- Karimlu
- Kulatan
- Lajayer
- Meykhosh
- Mohreh
- Owch Aghaj
- Owcheh
- Pileh Daraq
- Pireh Khalil
- Pormehr
- Seyyedlar-e Zahra
- Shilveh-ye Olya
- Shilveh-ye Sofla
- Siah
- Siavosh Kandi
- Sineh Sar
- Tamerdash
- Tazeh Kand-e Muran
- Umaslan-e Olya
- Umaslan-e Sofla
- Van-e Olya
- Van-e Sofla
- Vanestanaq
- Yal Dagarmani
- Yedi Daraq
