= Umaslan-e Sofla =

Village in Ardabil province, Iran

Umaslan-e Sofla Persian: اوماسلان سفلي
- Village
- Location within Iran
- Coordinates: 38°58′38″N 48°17′00″E
- Country: Iran
- Province: Ardabil
- County: Germi
- District: Muran
- Rural District: Ojarud-e Sharqi

Population (2016)
  - Total: 62
- Time zone: UTC+3:30 (IRST)

Umaslan-e Sofla (Persian: اوماسلان سفلي) (Note: Also romanized as Ūmāslān-e Soflá; also known as Sheykhlar (شیخلر) and Ūmāstān) is a village in Ojarud-e Sharqi Rural District of Muran District in Germi County, (Note: Formerly Moghan County) Ardabil province, Iran.

== Demographics ==
=== Population ===
At the time of the 2006 National Census, the village's population was 92 in 19 households. The following census in 2011 recorded 54 people in 15 households. The 2016 census measured the village's population at 62 people in 20 households.
