= Siavosh Kandi =

Village in Ardabil province, Iran

Siavosh Kandi Persian: سياوش كندي
- Village
- Location within Iran
- Coordinates: 39°03′40″N 48°12′42″E
- Country: Iran
- Province: Ardabil
- County: Germi
- District: Muran
- Rural District: Ojarud-e Sharqi

Population (2016)
  - Total: 205
- Time zone: UTC+3:30 (IRST)

Siavosh Kandi (Persian: سياوش كندي) (Note: Also romanized as Sīāvosh Kandī; also known as Sīāvosh) is a village in Ojarud-e Sharqi Rural District of Muran District in Germi County, (Note: Formerly Moghan County) Ardabil province, Iran.

== Demographics ==
=== Population ===
At the time of the 2006 National Census, the village's population was 246 in 45 households. The following census in 2011 recorded 219 people in 54 households. The 2016 census measured the village's population at 205 people in 60 households.
