= Qeshlaq-e Ilkhchi-ye Olya =

Village in Ardabil province, Iran

Qeshlaq-e Ilkhchi-ye Olya Persian: قشلاق ايلخچي عليا
- Village
- Location within Iran
- Coordinates: 39°10′35″N 48°08′14″E
- Country: Iran
- Province: Ardabil
- County: Germi
- District: Muran
- Rural District: Azadlu

Population (2016)
  - Total: 43
- Time zone: UTC+3:30 (IRST)

Qeshlaq-e Ilkhchi-ye Olya (Persian: قشلاق ايلخچي عليا) (Note: Also romanized as Qeshlāq-e Īlkhchī-ye ‘Olyā; also known as Qeshlāq-e Īlchī-ye ‘Olyā) is a village in Azadlu Rural District of Muran District in Germi County, (Note: Formerly Moghan County) Ardabil province, Iran.

== Demographics ==
=== Population ===
At the time of the 2006 National Census, the village's population was 80 in 15 households. The following census in 2011 counted 65 people in 16 households. The 2016 census measured the population of the village as 43 people in 13 households.
