= Burakabad, Kermanshah =

Burakabad بورك اباد
- Village
- Location within Iran
- Coordinates: 34°46′38″N 47°25′54″E
- Country: Iran
- Province: Kermanshah
- County: Sonqor
- Bakhsh: Kolyai
- Rural District: Satar

Population (2006)
  - Total: 156
- Time zone: UTC+3:30 (IRST)
  - Summer (DST): UTC+4:30 (IRDT)

Burakabad (Persian: بورك اباد, also Romanized as Būrakābād and Būrkābād) is a village in Satar Rural District, Kolyai District, Sonqor County, Kermanshah Province, Iran. At the 2006 census, its population was 156, in 35 families.
