= Zahra, Ardabil =

City in Ardabil province, Iran

Zahra Persian: زهرا
- City
- Location within Iran
- Coordinates: 39°02′48″N 48°17′32″E
- Country: Iran
- Province: Ardabil
- County: Germi
- District: Muran
- Established as a city: 2018

Population (2016)
  - Total: 326
- Time zone: UTC+3:30 (IRST)

Zahra (Persian: زهرا) (Note: Also romanized as Zahrā) is a city in, and the capital of, Muran District in Germi County, (Note: Formerly Moghan County) Ardabil province, Iran. It also serves as the administrative center for Ojarud-e Sharqi Rural District.

== Demographics ==
=== Population ===
At the time of the 2006 National Census, Zahra's population was 161 in 40 households, when it was a village in Ojarud-e Sharqi Rural District. The following census in 2011 counted 222 people in 45 households. The 2016 census measured the population of the village as 326 people in 59 households.

Zahra was converted to a city in 2018.
