= Jan Gan, Hormozgan =

Jan Gan جنگان
- Village
- Location within Iran
- Coordinates: 27°00′35″N 57°03′56″E
- Country: Iran
- Province: Hormozgan
- County: Minab
- Bakhsh: Central
- Rural District: Band-e Zarak

Population (2006)
  - Total: 177
- Time zone: UTC+3:30 (IRST)
  - Summer (DST): UTC+4:30 (IRDT)

Jan Gan (Persian: جنگان, also Romanized as Jān Gān, Jangān, and Jāngān) is a village in Band-e Zarak Rural District, in the Central District of Minab County, Hormozgan Province, Iran. At the 2006 census, its population was 177, in 36 families.
