= Muran District =

District in Ardabil province, Iran

Muran District Persian: بخش موران
- District
- Location within Iran
- Coordinates: 39°05′N 48°15′E
- Country: Iran
- Province: Ardabil
- County: Germi
- Established: 2001
- Capital: Zahra

Population (2016)
  - Total: 10,019
- Time zone: UTC+3:30 (IRST)

Muran District (Persian: بخش موران) is in Germi County, (Note: Formerly Moghan County) Ardabil province, Iran. Its capital is the city of Zahra.

== History ==
The village of Zahra was converted to a city in 2018.

== Demographics ==
=== Population ===
At the time of the 2006 census, the district's population was 12,964 in 2,556 households. The following census in 2011 counted 11,124 people in 2,723 households. The 2016 census measured the population of the district as 10,019 people in 2,931 households.

=== Administrative divisions ===
Muran District Population
Administrative Divisions	2006	2011	2016
Azadlu RD	4,720	4,197	3,855
Ojarud-e Sharqi RD	8,244	6,927	6,164
Zahra (city) (Note: Became a city after the 2016 census)			
Total	12,964	11,124	10,019
RD = Rural District
