= Qeshlaq Amir Khanlu =

Qeshlaq Amir Khanlu (Persian: قشلاق اميرخانلو) may refer to:

- Qeshlaq Amir Khanlu-ye Hajji Shakar
- Qeshlaq Amir Khanlu-ye Hajji Tapduq
- Qeshlaq Amir Khanlu-ye Moharramabad
- Qeshlaq Amir Khanlu-ye Pol-e Rahman
- Qeshlaq Amir Khanlu-ye Qarah Saqqal
