= Anbarlu =

Anbarlu (Persian: عنبرلو) may refer to:

- Anbarlu, Ardabil
- Anbarlu, East Azerbaijan
