= Takleh-ye Bakhsh =

Takleh-ye Bakhsh (Persian: تكله بخش) may refer to:

- Takleh-ye Bakhsh 1
- Takleh-ye Bakhsh 2
