= Tazeh Kand-e Jadid =

Neighborhood in Ardabil province, Iran

Tazeh Kand-e Jadid Persian: تازه كند جديد
- Neighborhood
- Location within Iran
- Coordinates: 39°34′18″N 48°01′27″E
- Country: Iran
- Province: Ardabil
- County: Parsabad
- District: Tazeh Kand
- City: Moghansar

Population (2006)
  - Total: 748
- Time zone: UTC+3:30 (IRST)

Tazeh Kand-e Jadid (Persian: تازه كندجديد) (Note: Also romanized as Tāzeh Kand-e Jadīd) is a neighborhood in the city of Moghansar in Tazeh Kand District of Parsabad County, Ardabil province, Iran.

== Demographics ==
=== Population ===
At the time of the 2006 National Census, Tazeh Kand-e Jadid's population was 748 in 158 households, when it was a village in Tazeh Kand Rural District.

In 2008, Tazeh Kand-e Jadid was merged with the village of Tazeh Kand-e Qadim to form the city of Tazeh Kand-e Qadim. (Note: Renamed Moghansar in 2019)
