= Owzun Qui =

Owzun Qui or Uzun Qui (Persian: اوزون قوئي) may refer to:

- Owzun Qui 1
- Owzun Qui 2
