= Qeshlaq-e Bahman Shir =

Village in Ardabil province, Iran

Qeshlaq-e Bahman Shir Persian: قشلاق بهمن شير
- Village
- Country: Iran
- Province: Ardabil
- County: Parsabad
- District: Tazeh Kand
- Rural District: Tazeh Kand

Population (2016)
  - Total: 0
- Time zone: UTC+3:30 (IRST)

Qeshlaq-e Bahman Shir (Persian: قشلاق بهمن شير) (Note: Also romanized as Qeshlāq-e Bahman Shīr) is a village in Tazeh Kand Rural District of Tazeh Kand District in Parsabad County, Ardabil province, Iran.

== Demographics ==
=== Population ===
At the time of the 2006 National Census, the village's population was nine in four households. The village did not appear in the following census of 2011. The 2016 census measured the population of the village as zero.
