= Hajji Morteza Kandi =

Village in Ardabil province, Iran

Hajji Morteza Kandi Persian: حاجي مرتضي كندي
- Village
- Location within Iran
- Country: Iran
- Province: Ardabil
- County: Parsabad
- District: Tazeh Kand
- Rural District: Mahmudabad

Population (2016)
  - Total: 273
- Time zone: UTC+3:30 (IRST)

Hajji Morteza Kandi (Persian: حاجي مرتضي كندي) (Note: Also romanized as Ḩājjī Morteẕá Kandī; also known as Morteẕá Qeshlāq) is a village in Mahmudabad Rural District (Note: Formerly Iranabad Rural District) of Tazeh Kand District in Parsabad County, Ardabil province, Iran.

== Demographics ==
=== Population ===
At the time of the 2006 National Census, the village's population was 322 in 67 households. The following census in 2011 counted 324 people in 90 households. The 2016 census measured the population of the village as 273 people in 79 households.
