= Takleh-ye Abbasabad-e Olya =

Village in Ardabil province, Iran

Takleh-ye Abbasabad-e Olya Persian: تكله عباس‌آباد علیا
- Village
- Location within Iran
- Coordinates: 39°33′27″N 48°02′23″E
- Country: Iran
- Province: Ardabil
- County: Parsabad
- District: Tazeh Kand
- Rural District: Tazeh Kand

Population (2016)
  - Total: 376
- Time zone: UTC+3:30 (IRST)

Takleh-ye Abbasabad-e Olya (Persian: تكله عباس‌آباد علیا) (Note: Also romanized as Takleh-ye ‘Abbāsābād-e ‘Olyā; also known as ‘Abbāsābād-e Bozorg and Qeshlāq-e Yel Ātān) is a village in Tazeh Kand Rural District of Tazeh Kand District in Parsabad County, Ardabil province, Iran.

== Demographics ==
=== Population ===
At the time of the 2006 National Census, the village's population was 342 in 69 households. The following census in 2011 counted 349 people in 84 households. The 2016 census measured the population of the village as 376 people in 105 households.
