= Takahchi =

Takahchi or Takah Chi (Persian: تكه چي) may refer to:

- Takahchi, Germi
- Takah Chi, Parsabad
