= Qeshlaq-e Salman va Alman =

Village in Ardabil province, Iran

Qeshlaq-e Salman va Alman Persian: قشلاق سلمان و المان
- Village
- Country: Iran
- Province: Ardabil
- County: Parsabad
- District: Tazeh Kand
- Rural District: Tazeh Kand

Population (2016)
  - Total: Below reporting threshold
- Time zone: UTC+3:30 (IRST)

Qeshlaq-e Salman va Alman (Persian: قشلاق سلمان والمان) (Note: Also romanized as Qeshlāq-e Salmān va Ālmān) is a village in Tazeh Kand Rural District of Tazeh Kand District in Parsabad County, Ardabil province, Iran.

== Demographics ==
=== Population ===
At the time of the 2006 National Census, the village's population was 21 in four households. The following census in 2011 counted a population below the reporting threshold. The 2016 census again measured the population of the village as below the reporting threshold.
