= Para Qeshlaq (disambiguation) =

Para Qeshlaq (Persian: پاراقشلاق), also rendered as Pareh Qeshlaq, may refer to:

- Para Qeshlaq, Parsabad County
- Para Qeshlaq-e Olya, Bileh Savar County
- Para Qeshlaq-e Sofla, Bileh Savar County
