= Firuzabad, Parsabad =

Village in Ardabil province, Iran

Firuzabad Persian: فيروزاباد
- Village
- Location within Iran
- Coordinates: 39°36′20″N 48°03′37″E
- Country: Iran
- Province: Ardabil
- County: Parsabad
- District: Tazeh Kand
- Rural District: Tazeh Kand

Population (2016)
  - Total: 1,251
- Time zone: UTC+3:30 (IRST)

Firuzabad (Persian: فيروزاباد) (Note: Also romanized as Fīrūzābād; also known as Fīrūzābād-e Yek) is a village in Tazeh Kand Rural District of Tazeh Kand District in Parsabad County, Ardabil province, Iran.

== Demographics ==
=== Population ===
At the time of the 2006 National Census, the village's population was 1,316 in 273 households. The following census in 2011 counted 1,399 people in 365 households. The 2016 census measured the population of the village as 1,251 people in 365 households.
