= Esmail Kandi, Ardabil =

Village in Ardabil province, Iran

Esmail Kandi Persian: اسماعيل كندي
- Village
- Location within Iran
- Coordinates: 39°31′52″N 47°54′06″E
- Country: Iran
- Province: Ardabil
- County: Parsabad
- District: Tazeh Kand
- Rural District: Mahmudabad

Population (2016)
  - Total: 465
- Time zone: UTC+3:30 (IRST)

Esmail Kandi (Persian: اسماعيل كندي) (Note: Also romanized as Esmā‘īl Kandī; also known as Esmā‘īl Khān-e Jelodār and Qeshlāq-e Esmā‘īl Khān) is a village in Mahmudabad Rural District (Note: Formerly Iranabad Rural District) of Tazeh Kand District in Parsabad County, Ardabil province, Iran.

== Demographics ==
=== Population ===
At the time of the 2006 National Census, the village's population was 926 in 197 households. The following census in 2011 counted 1,017 people in 282 households. The 2016 census measured the population of the village as 465 people in 142 households.
