= Hallajabad =

Village in Ardabil province, Iran

Hallajabad Persian: حلاج اباد
- Village
- Location within Iran
- Coordinates: 39°33′37″N 47°56′38″E
- Country: Iran
- Province: Ardabil
- County: Parsabad
- District: Tazeh Kand
- Rural District: Mahmudabad

Population (2016)
  - Total: 653
- Time zone: UTC+3:30 (IRST)

Hallajabad (Persian: حلاج اباد) (Note: Also romanized as Ḩallājābād) is a village in Mahmudabad Rural District (Note: Formerly Iranabad Rural District) of Tazeh Kand District in Parsabad County, Ardabil province, Iran.

== Demographics ==
=== Population ===
At the time of the 2006 National Census, the village's population was 696 in 125 households. The following census in 2011 counted 671 people in 151 households. The 2016 census measured the population of the village as 653 people in 173 households.
