= Mahmudabad-e Taleqani =

Village in Ardabil province, Iran

Mahmudabad-e Taleqani Persian: محمود اباد طالقاني
- Village
- Location within Iran
- Coordinates: 39°33′14″N 47°58′16″E
- Country: Iran
- Province: Ardabil
- County: Parsabad
- District: Tazeh Kand
- Rural District: Mahmudabad

Population (2016)
  - Total: 2,060
- Time zone: UTC+3:30 (IRST)

Mahmudabad-e Taleqani (Persian: محمود اباد طالقاني) (Note: Also romanized as Maḩmūdābād-e Ţāleqānī) is a village in, and the capital of, Mahmudabad Rural District (Note: Formerly Iranabad Rural District) in Tazeh Kand District of Parsabad County, Ardabil province, Iran. The previous capital of the rural district was the village of Iranabad.

== Demographics ==
=== Population ===
At the time of the 2006 National Census, the village's population was 1,970 in 413 households. The following census in 2011 counted 2,073 people in 513 households. The 2016 census measured the population of the village as 2,060 people in 589 households. It was the most populous village in its rural district.
