= Kushlu =

Kushlu (Persian: كوشلو) may refer to:

- Kushlu, Ardabil
- Kushlu, Zanjan
