= Qeshlaq-e Hajji Avaz =

Village in Ardabil province, Iran

Qeshlaq-e Hajji Avaz Persian: قشلاق حاجي عوض
- Village
- Location within Iran
- Coordinates: 39°34′30″N 48°06′21″E
- Country: Iran
- Province: Ardabil
- County: Parsabad
- District: Tazeh Kand
- Rural District: Tazeh Kand

Population (2016)
  - Total: 947
- Time zone: UTC+3:30 (IRST)

Qeshlaq-e Hajji Avaz (Persian: قشلاق حاجي عوض) (Note: Also romanized as Qeshlāq-e Ḩājjī ‘Avaẕ) is a village in Tazeh Kand Rural District of Tazeh Kand District in Parsabad County, Ardabil province, Iran.

== Demographics ==
=== Population ===
At the time of the 2006 National Census, the village's population was 1,072 in 208 households. The following census in 2011 counted 1,028 people in 251 households. The 2016 census measured the population of the village as 947 people in 267 households.
