= Qeshlaq-e Sarudlu Kandi =

Village in Ardabil province, Iran

Qeshlaq-e Sarudlu Kandi Persian: قشلاق سرودلو كندي
- Village
- Location within Iran
- Coordinates: 39°30′52″N 47°52′49″E
- Country: Iran
- Province: Ardabil
- County: Parsabad
- District: Tazeh Kand
- Rural District: Mahmudabad

Population (2016)
  - Total: 285
- Time zone: UTC+3:30 (IRST)

Qeshlaq-e Sarudlu Kandi (Persian: قشلاق سرودلو كندي) (Note: Also romanized as Qeshlāq-e Sarūdlū Kandī) is a village in Mahmudabad Rural District (Note: Formerly Iranabad Rural District) of Tazeh Kand District in Parsabad County, Ardabil province, Iran.

== Demographics ==
=== Population ===
At the time of the 2006 National Census, the village's population was 395 in 93 households. The following census in 2011 counted 350 people in 83 households. The 2016 census measured the population of the village as 285 people in 82 households.
