= Quja Beyglu =

Village in Ardabil province, Iran

Quja Beyglu Persian: قوجابيگلو
- Village
- Location within Iran
- Coordinates: 39°37′31″N 47°56′54″E
- Country: Iran
- Province: Ardabil
- County: Parsabad
- District: Central
- Rural District: Savalan

Population (2016)
  - Total: 322
- Time zone: UTC+3:30 (IRST)

Quja Beyglu (Persian: قوجابيگلو) (Note: Also romanized as Qūjā Beyglū) is a village in Savalan Rural District of the Central District in Parsabad County, Ardabil province, Iran.

== Demographics ==
=== Population ===
According to the 2006 National Census, the village had a population of 340 across 61 households. The 2011 census counted 318 people across 89 households. The 2016 census recorded a population of 322 people across 91 households.
