= Majidabad, Parsabad =

Village in Ardabil province, Iran

Majidabad Persian: مجيداباد
- Village
- Location within Iran
- Coordinates: 39°38′10″N 47°57′15″E
- Country: Iran
- Province: Ardabil
- County: Parsabad
- District: Central
- Rural District: Savalan

Population (2016)
  - Total: 577
- Time zone: UTC+3:30 (IRST)

Majidabad (Persian: مجيداباد) (Note: Also romanized as Majīdābād) is a village in Savalan Rural District of the Central District in Parsabad County, Ardabil province, Iran.

== Demographics ==
=== Population ===
At the time of the 2006 National Census, the village's population was 631 in 140 households. The following census in 2011 counted 646 people in 161 households. The 2016 census measured the population of the village as 577 people in 164 households.
