= Iranabad =

Village in Ardabil province, Iran

Iranabad Persian: ايران اباد
- Village
- Location within Iran
- Coordinates: 39°35′01″N 47°57′30″E
- Country: Iran
- Province: Ardabil
- County: Parsabad
- District: Central
- Rural District: Savalan

Population (2016)
  - Total: 2,051
- Time zone: UTC+3:30 (IRST)

Iranabad (Persian: ايران اباد) (Note: Also romanized as Īrānābād) is a village in Savalan Rural District of the Central District in Parsabad County, Ardabil province, Iran. It was the capital of Mahmudabad Rural District (Note: Formerly Iranabad Rural District) until its capital was transferred to the village of Mahmudabad-e Taleqani.

== Demographics ==
=== Population ===
At the time of the 2006 National Census, the village's population was 2,227 in 478 households. The following census in 2011 counted 2,256 people in 582 households. The 2016 census measured the population of the village as 2,051 people in 594 households.
