= Qeshlaq Amir Khanlu-ye Moharramabad =

Village in Ardabil province, Iran

Qeshlaq Amir Khanlu-ye Moharramabad Persian: قشلاق اميرخانلومحرم اباد
- Village
- Location within Iran
- Coordinates: 39°31′01″N 47°55′55″E
- Country: Iran
- Province: Ardabil
- County: Parsabad
- District: Tazeh Kand
- Rural District: Mahmudabad

Population (2016)
  - Total: 51
- Time zone: UTC+3:30 (IRST)

Qeshlaq Amir Khanlu-ye Moharramabad (Persian: قشلاق اميرخانلومحرم اباد) (Note: Also romanized as Qeshlāq Amīr Khānlū-ye Moḩarramābād; also known as Qeshlāq-e Amīr Khānī) is a village in Mahmudabad Rural District (Note: Formerly Iranabad Rural District) of Tazeh Kand District in Parsabad County, Ardabil province, Iran.

== Demographics ==
=== Population ===
At the time of the 2006 National Census, the village's population was 46 in nine households. The following census in 2011 counted 43 people in 10 households. The 2016 census measured the population of the village as 51 people in 13 households.
