= Moghansar =

City in Ardabil province, Iran

Moghansar Persian: مغانسر
- City
- Location within Iran
- Coordinates: 39°34′32″N 48°00′57″E
- Country: Iran
- Province: Ardabil
- County: Parsabad
- District: Tazeh Kand
- Established as a city: 2008

Population (2016)
  - Total: 2,575
- Time zone: UTC+3:30 (IRST)

Moghansar (Persian: مغانسر) (Note: Formerly Tazeh Kand-e Qadim (تازه كندقديم), also romanized as Tāzeh Kand-e Qadīm; also known as Tāzeh Kand) is a city in, and the capital of, Tazeh Kand District in Parsabad County, Ardabil province, Iran. It also serves as the administrative center for Tazeh Kand Rural District.

== Demographics ==
=== Population ===
At the time of the 2006 National Census, the population was 2,802 in 574 households, when it was the village of Tazeh Kand-e Qadim in Tazeh Kand Rural District. The following census in 2011 counted 2,798 people in 716 households, by which time the village had merged with Tazeh Kand-e Jadid and was elevated to the status of a city. The 2016 census measured the population of the city as 2,575 people in 708 households.

The name of the city of Tazeh Kand-e Qadim was changed to Moghansar in 2019.
