= Qeshlaq Amir Khanlu-ye Hajji Tapduq =

Village in Ardabil province, Iran

Qeshlaq Amir Khanlu-ye Hajji Tapduq Persian: قشلاق اميرخانلوحاجي تاپدوق
- Village
- Location within Iran
- Country: Iran
- Province: Ardabil
- County: Parsabad
- District: Tazeh Kand
- Rural District: Mahmudabad

Population (2016)
  - Total: 518
- Time zone: UTC+3:30 (IRST)

Qeshlaq Amir Khanlu-ye Hajji Tapduq (Persian: قشلاق اميرخانلوحاجي تاپدوق) (Note: Also romanized as Qeshlāq Amīr Khānlū-ye Ḩājjī Tāpdūq; also known as Qeshlāq Amīr Khānlū-ye Ḩājj Tāpdūq) is a village in Mahmudabad Rural District (Note: Formerly Iranabad Rural District) of Tazeh Kand District in Parsabad County, Ardabil province, Iran.

== Demographics ==
=== Population ===
At the time of the 2006 National Census, the village's population was 798 in 168 households. The following census in 2011 counted 719 people in 156 households. The 2016 census measured the population of the village as 518 people in 140 households.
