= Urtlu =

Village in Ardabil province, Iran

Urtlu Persian: اورتلو
- Village
- Location within Iran
- Coordinates: 39°40′58″N 48°01′54″E
- Country: Iran
- Province: Ardabil
- County: Parsabad
- District: Central
- Rural District: Savalan

Population (2016)
  - Total: 187
- Time zone: UTC+3:30 (IRST)

Urtlu (Persian: اورتلو) (Note: Also romanized as Ūrtlū; also known as Qāsem ‘Alī, Qāsemābād, and Salmānābād) is a village in Savalan Rural District of the Central District in Parsabad County, Ardabil province, Iran.

== Demographics ==
=== Population ===
At the time of the 2006 National Census, the village's population was 233 in 36 households. The following census in 2011 counted 229 people in 53 households. The 2016 census measured the population of the village as 187 people in 45 households.
