= Arablu Kandi =

Village in Ardabil province, Iran

Arablu Kandi Persian: عربلوكندي
- Village
- Location within Iran
- Coordinates: 39°39′54″N 47°57′02″E
- Country: Iran
- Province: Ardabil
- County: Parsabad
- District: Central
- Rural District: Savalan

Population (2016)
  - Total: 1,152
- Time zone: UTC+3:30 (IRST)

Arablu Kandi (Persian: عربلوكندي) (Note: Also romanized as ‘Arablū Kandī) is a village in Savalan Rural District of the Central District in Parsabad County, Ardabil province, Iran.

== Demographics ==
=== Population ===
At the time of the 2006 National Census, the village's population was 242 in 46 households. The following census in 2011 counted 1,273 people in 334 households. The 2016 census measured the population of the village as 1,152 people in 337 households.
