= Hajji Jafar Kandi, Parsabad =

Village in Ardabil province, Iran

Hajji Jafar Kandi Persian: حاجي جعفركندي
- Village
- Location within Iran
- Coordinates: 39°38′50″N 48°02′22″E
- Country: Iran
- Province: Ardabil
- County: Parsabad
- District: Central
- Rural District: Savalan

Population (2016)
  - Total: 112
- Time zone: UTC+3:30 (IRST)

Hajji Jafar Kandi (Persian: حاجي جعفركندي) (Note: Also romanized as Ḩājjī Ja‘far Kandī) is a village in Savalan Rural District of the Central District in Parsabad County, Ardabil province, Iran.

== Demographics ==
=== Population ===
At the time of the 2006 National Census, the village's population was 144 in 31 households. The following census in 2011 counted 144 people in 38 households. The 2016 census measured the population of the village as 112 people in 30 households.
