= Takleh-ye Bakhsh-e Yek =

Village in Ardabil province, Iran

Takleh-ye Bakhsh-e Yek Persian: تكله بخش 1
- Village
- Location within Iran
- Coordinates: 39°33′12″N 48°04′10″E
- Country: Iran
- Province: Ardabil
- County: Parsabad
- District: Tazeh Kand
- Rural District: Tazeh Kand

Population (2016)
  - Total: 738
- Time zone: UTC+3:30 (IRST)

Takleh-ye Bakhsh-e Yek (Persian: تكله بخش 1) is a village in Tazeh Kand Rural District of Tazeh Kand District in Parsabad County, Ardabil province, Iran.

== Demographics ==
=== Population ===
At the time of the 2006 National Census, the village's population was 703 in 139 households. The following census in 2011 counted 706 people in 173 households. The 2016 census measured the population of the village as 738 people in 219 households.
