= Takleh-ye Bakhsh-e Do =

Village in Ardabil province, Iran

Takleh-ye Bakhsh-e Do Persian: تكله بخش 2
- Village
- Location within Iran
- Country: Iran
- Province: Ardabil
- County: Parsabad
- District: Tazeh Kand
- Rural District: Tazeh Kand

Population (2016)
  - Total: 1,515
- Time zone: UTC+3:30 (IRST)

Takleh-ye Bakhsh-e Do (Persian: تكله بخش 2) is a village in Tazeh Kand Rural District of Tazeh Kand District in Parsabad County, Ardabil province, Iran.

== Demographics ==
=== Population ===
At the time of the 2006 National Census, the village's population was 1,491 in 295 households. The following census in 2011 counted 1,448 people in 361 households. The 2016 census measured the population of the village as 1,515 people in 450 households. It was the most populous village in its rural district.
