= Mahmudabad Rural District (Parsabad County) =

Rural district in Ardabil province, Iran

Mahmudabad Rural District Persian: دهستان محمودآباد
- Rural District
- Location within Iran
- Coordinates: 39°32′N 47°57′E
- Country: Iran
- Province: Ardabil
- County: Parsabad
- District: Tazeh Kand
- Established: 2001
- Capital: Mahmudabad-e Taleqani

Population (2016)
  - Total: 4,615
- Time zone: UTC+3:30 (IRST)

Mahmudabad Rural District (Persian: دهستان محمودآباد) (Note: Formerly Iranabad Rural District (دهستان ايران اباد)) is in Tazeh Kand District of Parsabad County, Ardabil province, Iran. Its capital is the village of Mahmudabad-e Taleqani. The previous capital of the rural district was the village of Iranabad.

== Demographics ==
=== Population ===
At the time of the 2006 National Census, the rural district's population was 5,579 in 1,169 households. There were 5,525 inhabitants in 1,361 households at the following census of 2011. The 2016 census measured the population of the rural district as 4,615 in 1,303 households. The most populous of its 10 villages was Mahmudabad-e Taleqani, with 2,060 people.

=== Other villages in the rural district ===
- Esmail Kandi
- Hajji Morteza Kandi
- Hallajabad
- Qeshlaq Amir Khanlu-ye Hajji Shakar
- Qeshlaq Amir Khanlu-ye Hajji Tapduq
- Qeshlaq Amir Khanlu-ye Moharramabad
- Qeshlaq Amir Khanlu-ye Pol-e Rahman
- Qeshlaq Amir Khanlu-ye Qarah Saqqal
- Qeshlaq-e Sarudlu Kandi
