= Qeshlaq Amir Khanlu-ye Pol-e Rahman =

Village in Ardabil province, Iran

Qeshlaq Amir Khanlu-ye Pol-e Rahman Persian: قشلاق اميرخانلوپل رحمان
- Village
- Location within Iran
- Coordinates: 39°29′58″N 47°59′40″E
- Country: Iran
- Province: Ardabil
- County: Parsabad
- District: Tazeh Kand
- Rural District: Mahmudabad

Population (2016)
  - Total: 114
- Time zone: UTC+3:30 (IRST)

Qeshlaq Amir Khanlu-ye Pol-e Rahman (Persian: قشلاق اميرخانلوپل رحمان) (Note: Also romanized as Qeshlāq Amīr Khānlū-ye Pol-e Raḩmān) is a village in Mahmudabad Rural District (Note: Formerly Iranabad Rural District) of Tazeh Kand District in Parsabad County, Ardabil province, Iran.

== Demographics ==
=== Population ===
At the time of the 2006 National Census, the village's population was 123 in 31 households. The following census in 2011 counted 104 people in 26 households. The 2016 census measured the population of the village as 114 people in 32 households.
