= Qeshlaq Amir Khanlu-ye Qarah Saqqal =

Village in Ardabil province, Iran

Qeshlaq Amir Khanlu-ye Qarah Saqqal Persian: قشلاق اميرخانلوقره سقل
- Village
- Location within Iran
- Country: Iran
- Province: Ardabil
- County: Parsabad
- District: Tazeh Kand
- Rural District: Mahmudabad

Population (2016)
  - Total: 93
- Time zone: UTC+3:30 (IRST)

Qeshlaq Amir Khanlu-ye Qarah Saqqal (Persian: قشلاق اميرخانلوقره سقل) (Note: Also romanized as Qeshlāq Amīr Khānlū-ye Qarah Saqqāl) is a village in Mahmudabad Rural District (Note: Formerly Iranabad Rural District) of Tazeh Kand District in Parsabad County, Ardabil province, Iran.

== Demographics ==
=== Population ===
At the time of the 2006 National Census, the village's population was 121 in 25 households. The following census in 2011 counted 97 people in 22 households. The 2016 census measured the population of the village as 93 people in 24 households.
