= Tazehabad, Parsabad =

Village in Ardabil province, Iran

Tazehabad Persian: تازه اباد
- Village
- Location within Iran
- Coordinates: 39°41′30″N 47°59′13″E
- Country: Iran
- Province: Ardabil
- County: Parsabad
- District: Central
- Rural District: Savalan

Population (2016)
  - Total: 17
- Time zone: UTC+3:30 (IRST)

Tazehabad (Persian: تازه اباد) (Note: Also romanized as Tāzehābād) is a village in Savalan Rural District of the Central District in Parsabad County, Ardabil province, Iran.

== Demographics ==
=== Population ===
At the time of the 2006 National Census, the village's population was 47 in 12 households. The following census in 2011 counted 25 people in six households. The 2016 census measured the population of the village as 17 people in four households.
