= Savalan Rural District =

Rural district in Ardabil province, Iran

Savalan Rural District Persian: دهستان ساوالان
- Rural District
- Location within Iran
- Coordinates: 39°37′N 47°58′E
- Country: Iran
- Province: Ardabil
- County: Parsabad
- District: Central
- Established: 1990
- Capital: Gushlu

Population (2016)
  - Total: 15,496
- Time zone: UTC+3:30 (IRST)

Savalan Rural District (Persian: دهستان ساوالان) is in the Central District of Parsabad County, Ardabil province, Iran. Its capital is the village of Gushlu.

== Demographics ==
=== Population ===
At the time of the 2006 National Census, the rural district's population was 17,320 in 3,554 households. There were 18,175 inhabitants in 4,633 households at the following census of 2011. The 2016 census measured the population of the rural district as 15,496 in 4,415 households. The most populous of its 20 villages was Ajirlu, with 4,259 people.

=== Other villages in the rural district ===
- Abdol Rezaabad
- Arablu Kandi
- Bahramabad
- Dust Kandi
- Hajji Jafar Kandi
- Hamdollahabad
- Iranabad
- Khan Qeshlaqi-ye Yek
- Majidabad
- Molla Kandi
- Para Qeshlaq
- Petli Kand
- Qatarabad
- Quja Beyglu
- Takah Chi
- Tazeh Kand-e Kian
- Tazehabad
- Urtlu
