= Hamdollahabad =

Village in Ardabil province, Iran

Hamdollahabad Persian: حمداله اباد
- Village
- Location within Iran
- Coordinates: 39°37′52″N 48°03′37″E
- Country: Iran
- Province: Ardabil
- County: Parsabad
- District: Central
- Rural District: Savalan

Population (2016)
  - Total: 366
- Time zone: UTC+3:30 (IRST)

Hamdollahabad (Persian: حمداله اباد) (Note: Also romanized as Ḩamdollāhābād) is a village in Savalan Rural District of the Central District in Parsabad County, Ardabil province, Iran.

== Demographics ==
=== Population ===
At the time of the 2006 National Census, the village's population was 379 in 75 households. The following census in 2011 counted 372 people in 86 households. The 2016 census measured the population of the village as 366 people in 92 households.
