= Bahramabad, Parsabad =

Village in Ardabil province, Iran

Bahramabad Persian: بهرام اباد
- Village
- Location within Iran
- Coordinates: 39°38′07″N 48°03′22″E
- Country: Iran
- Province: Ardabil
- County: Parsabad
- District: Central
- Rural District: Savalan

Population (2016)
  - Total: 464
- Time zone: UTC+3:30 (IRST)

Bahramabad (Persian: بهرام اباد) (Note: Also romanized as Bahrāmābād) is a village in Savalan Rural District of the Central District in Parsabad County, Ardabil province, Iran.

== Demographics ==
=== Population ===
At the time of the 2006 National Census, the village's population was 583 in 134 households. The following census in 2011 counted 478 people in 123 households. The 2016 census measured the population of the village as 464 people in 125 households.
