= Qeshlaq Amir Khanlu-ye Hajji Shakar =

Village in Ardabil province, Iran

Qeshlaq Amir Khanlu-ye Hajji Shakar Persian: قشلاق اميرخانلوحاجي شكر
- Village
- Location within Iran
- Coordinates: 39°30′17″N 47°58′53″E
- Country: Iran
- Province: Ardabil
- County: Parsabad
- District: Tazeh Kand
- Rural District: Mahmudabad

Population (2016)
  - Total: 103
- Time zone: UTC+3:30 (IRST)

Qeshlaq Amir Khanlu-ye Hajji Shakar (Persian: قشلاق اميرخانلوحاجي شكر) (Note: Also romanized as Qeshlāq Amīr Khānlū-ye Ḩājjī Shakar; also known as Qeshlāq Amīr Khānlū-ye Ḩājj Shakar) is a village in Mahmudabad Rural District (Note: Formerly Iranabad Rural District) of Tazeh Kand District in Parsabad County, Ardabil province, Iran.

== Demographics ==
=== Population ===
At the time of the 2006 National Census, the village's population was 182 in 41 households. The following census in 2011 counted 127 people in 28 households. The 2016 census measured the population of the village as 103 people in 29 households.
