= Abdol Rezaabad =

Village in Ardabil province, Iran

Abdol Rezaabad Persian: عبدالرضااباد
- Village
- Location within Iran
- Coordinates: 39°38′12″N 48°01′12″E
- Country: Iran
- Province: Ardabil
- County: Parsabad
- District: Central
- Rural District: Savalan

Population (2016)
  - Total: 847
- Time zone: UTC+3:30 (IRST)

Abdol Rezaabad (Persian: عبدالرضااباد) (Note: Also romanized as ‘Abd or Reẕāābād and ‘Abdol Reẕāābād; also known as Qarah Qābākh and Qarah Qābākh-e Ḩasan Khānlū) is a village in Savalan Rural District of the Central District in Parsabad County, Ardabil province, Iran.

== Demographics ==
=== Population ===
At the time of the 2006 National Census, the village's population was 840 in 173 households. The following census in 2011 counted 670 people in 218 households. The 2016 census measured the population of the village as 847 people in 229 households.
