= Owzun Qui-ye Do =

Village in Ardabil province, Iran

Owzun Qui-ye Do Persian: اوزون قوئي دو
- Village
- Location within Iran
- Coordinates: 39°35′33″N 48°03′32″E
- Country: Iran
- Province: Ardabil
- County: Parsabad
- District: Tazeh Kand
- Rural District: Tazeh Kand

Population (2016)
  - Total: 433
- Time zone: UTC+3:30 (IRST)

Owzun Qui-ye Do (Persian: اوزون قوئي دو) (Note: Also romanized as Owzūn Qū’ī-ye Do and Ūzūn Qū’ī-ye Do) is a village in Tazeh Kand Rural District of Tazeh Kand District in Parsabad County, Ardabil province, Iran.

== Demographics ==
=== Population ===
At the time of the 2006 National Census, the village's population was 401 in 81 households. The following census in 2011 counted 398 people in 98 households. The 2016 census measured the population of the village as 433 people in 117 households.
