= Anbarlu, Ardabil =

Village in Ardabil province, Iran

Anbarlu Persian: عنبرلو
- Village
- Location within Iran
- Coordinates: 39°33′33″N 48°00′32″E
- Country: Iran
- Province: Ardabil
- County: Parsabad
- District: Tazeh Kand
- Rural District: Tazeh Kand

Population (2016)
  - Total: 21
- Time zone: UTC+3:30 (IRST)

Anbarlu (Persian: عنبرلو) (Note: Also romanized as ‘Anbarlū) is a village in Tazeh Kand Rural District of Tazeh Kand District in Parsabad County, Ardabil province, Iran.

== Demographics ==
=== Population ===
At the time of the 2006 National Census, the village's population was 21 in four households. The following census in 2011 counted 23 people in five households. The 2016 census measured the population of the village as 21 people in five households.
