= Molla Kandi, Ardabil =

Village in Ardabil province, Iran

Molla Kandi Persian: ملاكندي
- Village
- Location within Iran
- Coordinates: 39°36′28″N 47°58′27″E
- Country: Iran
- Province: Ardabil
- County: Parsabad
- District: Central
- Rural District: Savalan

Population (2016)
  - Total: 850
- Time zone: UTC+3:30 (IRST)

Molla Kandi (Persian: ملاكندي) (Note: Also romanized as Mollā Kandī) is a village in Savalan Rural District of the Central District in Parsabad County, Ardabil province, Iran.

== Demographics ==
=== Population ===
At the time of the 2006 National Census, the village's population was 969 in 183 households. The following census in 2011 counted 949 people in 248 households. The 2016 census measured the population of the village as 850 people in 238 households.
