= Ajirlu =

Village in Ardabil province, Iran

Ajirlu Persian: اجيرلو
- Village
- Location within Iran
- Coordinates: 39°37′14″N 47°55′04″E
- Country: Iran
- Province: Ardabil
- County: Parsabad
- District: Central
- Rural District: Savalan

Population (2016)
  - Total: 4,259
- Time zone: UTC+3:30 (IRST)

Ajirlu (Persian: اجيرلو) (Note: Also romanized as Ajīrloo and Ajirloo; also known as Ebrāhīmābād-e Ajīrloo and Ebrāhīmābād-e Qadīm (ابراهيم ابادقديم)) is a village in Savalan Rural District of the Central District in Parsabad County, Ardabil province, Iran.

== Demographics ==
=== Population ===
At the time of the 2006 National Census, the village's population was 5,461 in 1,107 households. The following census in 2011 counted 5,493 people in 1,363 households. The 2016 census measured the population of the village as 4,259 people in 1,206 households. It was the most populous village in its rural district.
