= Petli Kand =

Village in Ardabil province, Iran

Petli Kand Persian: پتلي كند
- Village
- Location within Iran
- Coordinates: 39°40′54″N 47°58′45″E
- Country: Iran
- Province: Ardabil
- County: Parsabad
- District: Central
- Rural District: Savalan

Population (2016)
  - Total: 12
- Time zone: UTC+3:30 (IRST)

Petli Kand (Persian: پتلي كند) (Note: Also romanized as Petlī Kand; also known as Petlī Kandī and Petlū Kandī) is a village in Savalan Rural District of the Central District in Parsabad County, Ardabil province, Iran.

== Demographics ==
=== Population ===
At the time of the 2006 National Census, the village's population was 22 in six households. The following census in 2011 counted eight people in four households. The 2016 census measured the population of the village as 12 people in four households.
