= Owzun Qui-ye Yek =

Village in Ardabil province, Iran

Owzun Qui-ye Yek Persian: اوزن قوئي يك
- Village
- Location within Iran
- Coordinates: 39°36′05″N 48°03′28″E
- Country: Iran
- Province: Ardabil
- County: Parsabad
- District: Tazeh Kand
- Rural District: Tazeh Kand

Population (2016)
  - Total: 513
- Time zone: UTC+3:30 (IRST)

Owzun Qui-ye Yek (Persian: اوزن قوئي يك) (Note: Also romanized as Owzūn Qū’ī-ye Yek; also known as Owzūn Qū’ī) is a village in Tazeh Kand Rural District of Tazeh Kand District in Parsabad County, Ardabil province, Iran.

== Demographics ==
=== Population ===
At the time of the 2006 National Census, the village's population was 466 in 107 households. The following census in 2011 counted 509 people in 127 households. The 2016 census measured the population of the village as 513 people in 140 households.
