= Dust Kandi =

Village in Ardabil province, Iran

Dust Kandi Persian: دوست كندي
- Village
- Location within Iran
- Coordinates: 39°40′35″N 47°57′45″E
- Country: Iran
- Province: Ardabil
- County: Parsabad
- District: Central
- Rural District: Savalan

Population (2016)
  - Total: 377
- Time zone: UTC+3:30 (IRST)

Dust Kandi (Persian: دوست كندي) (Note: Also romanized as Dūst Kandī) is a village in Savalan Rural District of the Central District in Parsabad County, Ardabil province, Iran.

== Demographics ==
=== Population ===
At the time of the 2006 National Census, the village's population was 512 in 107 households. The following census in 2011 counted 497 people in 127 households. The 2016 census measured the population of the village as 377 people in 122 households.
