= Qatarabad =

Village in Ardabil province, Iran

Qatarabad Persian: قطاراباد
- Village
- Location within Iran
- Coordinates: 39°38′00″N 48°03′40″E
- Country: Iran
- Province: Ardabil
- County: Parsabad
- District: Central
- Rural District: Savalan

Population (2016)
  - Total: 782
- Time zone: UTC+3:30 (IRST)

Qatarabad (Persian: قطاراباد) (Note: Also romanized as Qaţārābād) is a village in Savalan Rural District of the Central District in Parsabad County, Ardabil province, Iran.

== Demographics ==
=== Population ===
At the time of the 2006 National Census, the village's population was 829 in 172 households. The following census in 2011 counted 954 people in 245 households. The 2016 census measured the population of the village as 782 people in 207 households.
