= Tazeh Kand-e Kian =

Village in Ardabil province, Iran

Tazeh Kand-e Kian Persian: تازه كندكيان
- Village
- Location within Iran
- Coordinates: 39°41′53″N 47°59′18″E
- Country: Iran
- Province: Ardabil
- County: Parsabad
- District: Central
- Rural District: Savalan

Population (2016)
  - Total: 135
- Time zone: UTC+3:30 (IRST)

Tazeh Kand-e Kian (Persian: تازه كندكيان) (Note: Also romanized as Tāzeh Kand-e Kīān) is a village in Savalan Rural District of the Central District in Parsabad County, Ardabil province, Iran.

== Demographics ==
=== Population ===
At the time of the 2006 National Census, the village's population was 137 in 30 households. The following census in 2011 counted 144 people in 33 households. The 2016 census measured the population of the village as 135 people in 47 households.
