= Khan Qeshlaqi-ye Yek =

Village in Ardabil province, Iran

Khan Qeshlaqi-ye Yek Persian: خان قشلاقي 1
- Village
- Location within Iran
- Coordinates: 39°40′09″N 48°00′33″E
- Country: Iran
- Province: Ardabil
- County: Parsabad
- District: Central
- Rural District: Savalan

Population (2016)
  - Total: 466
- Time zone: UTC+3:30 (IRST)

Khan Qeshlaqi-ye Yek (Persian: خان قشلاقي 1) (Note: Also romanized as Khān Qeshlāqī-ye Yek; also known as Khān Qeshlāq and Khān Qeshlāqī) is a village in Savalan Rural District of the Central District in Parsabad County, Ardabil province, Iran.

== Demographics ==
=== Population ===
At the time of the 2006 National Census, the village's population was 571 in 116 households. The following census in 2011 counted 564 people in 163 households. The 2016 census measured the population of the village as 466 people in 125 households.
