= Tazeh Kand Rural District (Parsabad County) =

Rural district in Ardabil province, Iran

Tazeh Kand Rural District Persian: دهستان تازه كند
- Rural District
- Location within Iran
- Coordinates: 39°33′N 48°04′E
- Country: Iran
- Province: Ardabil
- County: Parsabad
- District: Tazeh Kand
- Established: 1987
- Capital: Moghansar

Population (2016)
  - Total: 5,816
- Time zone: UTC+3:30 (IRST)

Tazeh Kand Rural District (Persian: دهستان تازه كند) is in Tazeh Kand District of Parsabad County, Ardabil province, Iran. It is administered from the city of Moghansar. (Note: Formerly Tazeh Kand-e Qadim)

== Demographics ==
=== Population ===
At the time of the 2006 National Census, the rural district's population was 8,656 in 1,760 households. There were 5,881 inhabitants in 1,468 households at the following census of 2011. The 2016 census measured the population of the rural district as 5,816 in 1,673 households. The most populous of its 15 villages was Takleh-ye Bakhsh-e Do, with 1,515 people.

=== Other villages in the rural district ===
- Anbarlu
- Firuzabad
- Owzun Qui-ye Do
- Owzun Qui-ye Yek
- Qeshlaq-e Bahman Shir
- Qeshlaq-e Hajji Avaz
- Qeshlaq-e Salman va Alman
- Takleh-ye Abbasabad-e Olya
- Takleh-ye Bakhsh-e Yek
