= Para Qeshlaq =

Village in Ardabil province, Iran

Para Qeshlaq Persian: پاراقشلاق
- Village
- Location within Iran
- Coordinates: 39°38′59″N 47°59′56″E
- Country: Iran
- Province: Ardabil
- County: Parsabad
- District: Central
- Rural District: Savalan

Population (2016)
  - Total: 445
- Time zone: UTC+3:30 (IRST)

Para Qeshlaq (Persian: پاراقشلاق) (Note: Also romanized as Pārā Qeshlāq) is a village in Savalan Rural District of the Central District in Parsabad County, Ardabil province, Iran.

== Demographics ==
=== Population ===
At the time of the 2006 National Census, the village's population was 511 in 106 households. The following census in 2011 counted 441 people in 118 households. The 2016 census measured the population of the village as 445 people in 133 households.
