= Gushlu =

Village in Ardabil province, Iran

Gushlu Persian: گوشلو
- Village
- Location within Iran
- Coordinates: 39°37′24″N 47°59′16″E
- Country: Iran
- Province: Ardabil
- County: Parsabad
- District: Central
- Rural District: Savalan

Population (2016)
  - Total: 1,439
- Time zone: UTC+3:30 (IRST)

Gushlu (Persian: گوشلو) (Note: Also romanized as Gūshlū; also known as Kūshlū) is a village in, and the capital of, Savalan Rural District in the Central District of Parsabad County, Ardabil province, Iran.

== Demographics ==
=== Population ===
At the time of the 2006 National Census, the village's population was 1,680 in 355 households. The following census in 2011 counted 1,684 people in 443 households. The 2016 census measured the population of the village as 1,439 people in 446 households.
