= Takah Chi, Parsabad =

Village in Ardabil province, Iran

Takah Chi Persian: تكه چي
- Village
- Location within Iran
- Coordinates: 39°36′51″N 48°01′31″E
- Country: Iran
- Province: Ardabil
- County: Parsabad
- District: Central
- Rural District: Savalan

Population (2016)
  - Total: 636
- Time zone: UTC+3:30 (IRST)

Takah Chi (Persian: تكه چي) (Note: Also romanized as Takah Chī; also known as Takchī) is a village in Savalan Rural District of the Central District in Parsabad County, Ardabil province, Iran.

== Demographics ==
=== Population ===
At the time of the 2006 National Census, the village's population was 962 in 186 households. The following census in 2011 counted 830 people in 199 households. The 2016 census measured the population of the village as 636 people in 176 households.
