= Tazeh Kand District =

District in Ardabil province, Iran

Tazeh Kand District Persian: بخش تازه كند
- District
- Location within Iran
- Coordinates: 39°33′N 48°02′E
- Country: Iran
- Province: Ardabil
- County: Parsabad
- Established: 2001
- Capital: Moghansar

Population (2016)
  - Total: 13,006
- Time zone: UTC+3:30 (IRST)

Tazeh Kand District (Persian: بخش تازه كند) is in Parsabad County, Ardabil province, Iran. Its capital is the city of Moghansar. (Note: Formerly Tazeh Kand-e Qadim)

== History ==
In 2008, the village of Tazeh Kand-e Qadim was converted to a city and later renamed Moghansar.

== Demographics ==
=== Population ===
At the time of the 2006 National Census, the district's population was 14,235 in 2,929 households. The following census in 2011 counted 14,204 people in 3,545 households. The 2016 census measured the population of the district as 13,006 inhabitants living in 3,684 households.

=== Administrative divisions ===
Tazeh Kand District Population
Administrative Divisions	2006	2011	2016
Mahmudabad RD (Note: Formerly Iranabad Rural District)	5,579	5,525	4,615
Tazeh Kand RD	8,656	5,881	5,816
Moghansar (city)		2,798	2,575
Total	14,235	14,204	13,006
RD = Rural District
