= Jowzan =

Jowzan or Jauzan or Juzan or Jozan (Persian: جوزان) may refer to the following places in Iran:

- Juzan, Fars, a village in Nasrovan Rural District, Fars Province
- Jowzan, Hamadan, a village in Jowzan Rural District, Hamadan Province
- Juzan, Hamadana village in Muzaran Rural District, Hamadan Province
- Jowzan, Hormozgan, village in Howmeh Rural District, Hormozgan Province
- Jowzan, Rudan, a village in Rudkhaneh Bar Rural District, Hormozgan Province
- Jowzan, Razavi Khorasan, a village in Dowlatkhaneh Rural District, Razavi Khorasan Province
- Jowzan Rural District, Malayer County, Hamadan Province

== See also ==
- Juzan
- Jozan (disambiguation)
