= Alamdar =

Alamdar (Persian: علمدار) meaning Standard-bearer, used often in reference to Shi'ite standards, and may refer to:

- Alamdar, Ardabil
- Alamdar, East Azerbaijan
- Alamdar, Fars
- Alamdar, Hamadan
- Alamdar-e Olya, Hamadan Province
- Alamdar-e Sofla, Hamadan Province
- Alamdar, Khuzestan
- Alamdar, Mazandaran
- Alamdar, Razavi Khorasan

== See also ==
- Alemdar
