= Uch Tappeh, Malayer =

Village in Hamadan province, Iran

Uch Tappeh Persian: اوچ تپه
- Village
- Location within Iran
- Coordinates: 34°35′59″N 48°59′16″E
- Country: Iran
- Province: Hamadan
- County: Malayer
- District: Central
- Rural District: Tork-e Sharqi

Population (2016)
  - Total: 1,096
- Time zone: UTC+3:30 (IRST)

Uch Tappeh (Persian: اوچ تپه) (Note: Also romanized as Ūch Tappeh) is a village in Tork-e Sharqi Rural District in the Central District of Malayer County, Hamadan province, Iran.

== Demographics ==
=== Population ===
At the time of the 2006 National Census, the village's population was 1,380 in 281 households, when it was in Jowkar District. The following census in 2011 counted 1,164 people in 300 households. The 2016 census measured the population of the village as 1,096 people in 317 households, by which time the rural district had been transferred to the Central District.
