= Qeshlaq-e Qobad =

Village in Hamadan province, Iran

Qeshlaq-e Qobad Persian: قشلاق قباد
- Village
- Location within Iran
- Country: Iran
- Province: Hamadan
- County: Malayer
- District: Central
- Rural District: Tork-e Sharqi

Population (2016)
  - Total: 16
- Time zone: UTC+3:30 (IRST)

Qeshlaq-e Qobad (Persian: قشلاق قباد) (Note: Also romanized as Qeshlāq-e Qobād) is a village in Tork-e Sharqi Rural District in the Central District of Malayer County, Hamadan province, Iran.

== Demographics ==
=== Population ===
At the time of the 2006 National Census, the village's population was 48 in 11 households, when it was in Jowkar District. The following census in 2011 counted 38 people in 10 households. The 2016 census measured the population of the village as 16 people in five households, by which time the rural district had been transferred to the Central District.
