= Kheradmand =

Village in Hamadan province, Iran

Kheradmand Persian: خردمند
- Village
- Location within Iran
- Coordinates: 34°37′33″N 48°55′53″E
- Country: Iran
- Province: Hamadan
- County: Malayer
- District: Central
- Rural District: Tork-e Sharqi

Population (2016)
  - Total: 945
- Time zone: UTC+3:30 (IRST)

Kheradmand (Persian: خردمند) (Note: Also known as Kharand and Khorand) is a village in Tork-e Sharqi Rural District in the Central District of Malayer County, Hamadan province, Iran.

== Demographics ==
=== Population ===
At the time of the 2006 National Census, the village's population was 1,188 in 252 households, when it was in Jowkar District. The following census in 2011 counted 1,229 people in 308 households. The 2016 census measured the population of the village as 945 people in 263 households, by which time the rural district had been transferred to the Central District.
