= Dashtabad, Hamadan =

Village in Hamadan province, Iran

Dashtabad Persian: دشت اباد
- Village
- Location within Iran
- Coordinates: 34°28′48″N 48°52′52″E
- Country: Iran
- Province: Hamadan
- County: Malayer
- District: Central
- Rural District: Tork-e Sharqi

Population (2016)
  - Total: 580
- Time zone: UTC+3:30 (IRST)

Dashtabad (Persian: دشت اباد) (Note: Also romanized as Dashtābād) is a village in Tork-e Sharqi Rural District in the Central District of Malayer County, Hamadan province, Iran.

== Demographics ==
=== Population ===
At the time of the 2006 National Census, the village's population was 621 in 137 households, when it was in Jowkar District. The following census in 2011 counted 702 people in 188 households. The 2016 census measured the population of the village as 580 people in 170 households, by which time the rural district had been transferred to the Central District.
