= Tutal =

Village in Hamadan province, Iran

Tutal Persian: توتل
- Village
- Location within Iran
- Coordinates: 34°30′55″N 49°01′16″E
- Country: Iran
- Province: Hamadan
- County: Malayer
- District: Central
- Rural District: Tork-e Sharqi

Population (2016)
  - Total: 385
- Time zone: UTC+3:30 (IRST)

Tutal (Persian: توتل) (Note: Also romanized as Tūtal; also known as Dūtāl) is a village in Tork-e Sharqi Rural District in the Central District of Malayer County, Hamadan province, Iran.

== Demographics ==
=== Population ===
At the time of the 2006 National Census, the village's population was 423 in 103 households, when it was in Jowkar District. The following census in 2011 counted 433 people in 115 households. The 2016 census measured the population of the village as 385 people in 110 households, by which time the rural district had been transferred to the Central District.
