= Musa Bolaghi =

Village in Hamadan province, Iran

Musa Bolaghi Persian: موسي بلاغي
- Village
- Location within Iran
- Coordinates: 34°35′56″N 48°56′28″E
- Country: Iran
- Province: Hamadan
- County: Malayer
- District: Central
- Rural District: Tork-e Sharqi

Population (2016)
  - Total: 361
- Time zone: UTC+3:30 (IRST)

Musa Bolaghi (Persian: موسي بلاغي) (Note: Also romanized as Mūsá Bolāghī; formerly known as Mūsa Khān Balaghi (موسی خان بلاغی) and Mūsá Khān Bolāghī; also known as Mūsá Khān Bolāqī (موسي خان بلاقي) and Mūsá Khān-e Bolāgh (موسی خان بلاغ)) is a village in Tork-e Sharqi Rural District in the Central District of Malayer County, Hamadan province, Iran.

== Demographics ==
=== Population ===
At the time of the 2006 National Census, the village's population was 454 in 98 households, when it was in Jowkar District. The following census in 2011 counted 348 people in 106 households. The 2016 census measured the population of the village as 361 people in 117 households, by which time the rural district had been transferred to the Central District.
