= Tajar-e Alavi =

Village in Hamadan province, Iran

Tajar-e Alavi Persian: طجرعلوي
- Village
- Location within Iran
- Coordinates: 34°30′18″N 48°52′51″E
- Country: Iran
- Province: Hamadan
- County: Malayer
- District: Central
- Rural District: Tork-e Sharqi

Population (2016)
  - Total: 486
- Time zone: UTC+3:30 (IRST)

Tajar-e Alavi (Persian: طجرعلوي) (Note: Also romanized as Ţajar-e ‘Alavī; also known as Tajar and Ţajjar) is a village in Tork-e Sharqi Rural District in the Central District of Malayer County, Hamadan province, Iran.

== Demographics ==
=== Population ===
At the time of the 2006 National Census, the village's population was 663 in 164 households, when it was in Jowkar District. The following census in 2011 counted 588 people in 176 households. The 2016 census measured the population of the village as 486 people in 163 households, by which time the rural district had been transferred to the Central District.
