= Alavi, Hamadan =

Village in Hamadan province, Iran

Alavi Persian: علوي
- Village
- Location within Iran
- Coordinates: 34°32′33″N 48°56′11″E
- Country: Iran
- Province: Hamadan
- County: Malayer
- District: Central
- Rural District: Tork-e Sharqi

Population (2016)
  - Total: 2,660
- Time zone: UTC+3:30 (IRST)

Alavi (Persian: علوي) (Note: Also romanized as ‘Alavī; also known as Alitutal) is a village in, and the capital of, Tork-e Sharqi Rural District in the Central District of Malayer County, Hamadan province, Iran. The previous capital of the rural district was the village of Eslamabad, now the city of Eslamshahr-e Aqgol.

== Demographics ==
=== Population ===
At the time of the 2006 National Census, the village's population was 2,509 in 576 households, when it was in Jowkar District. The following census in 2011 counted 2,532 people in 746 households. The 2016 census measured the population of the village as 2,660 people in 798 households, by which time the rural district had been transferred to the Central District.
