= Mehrabad, Hamadan =

Village in Hamadan province, Iran

Mehrabad Persian: مهراباد
- Village
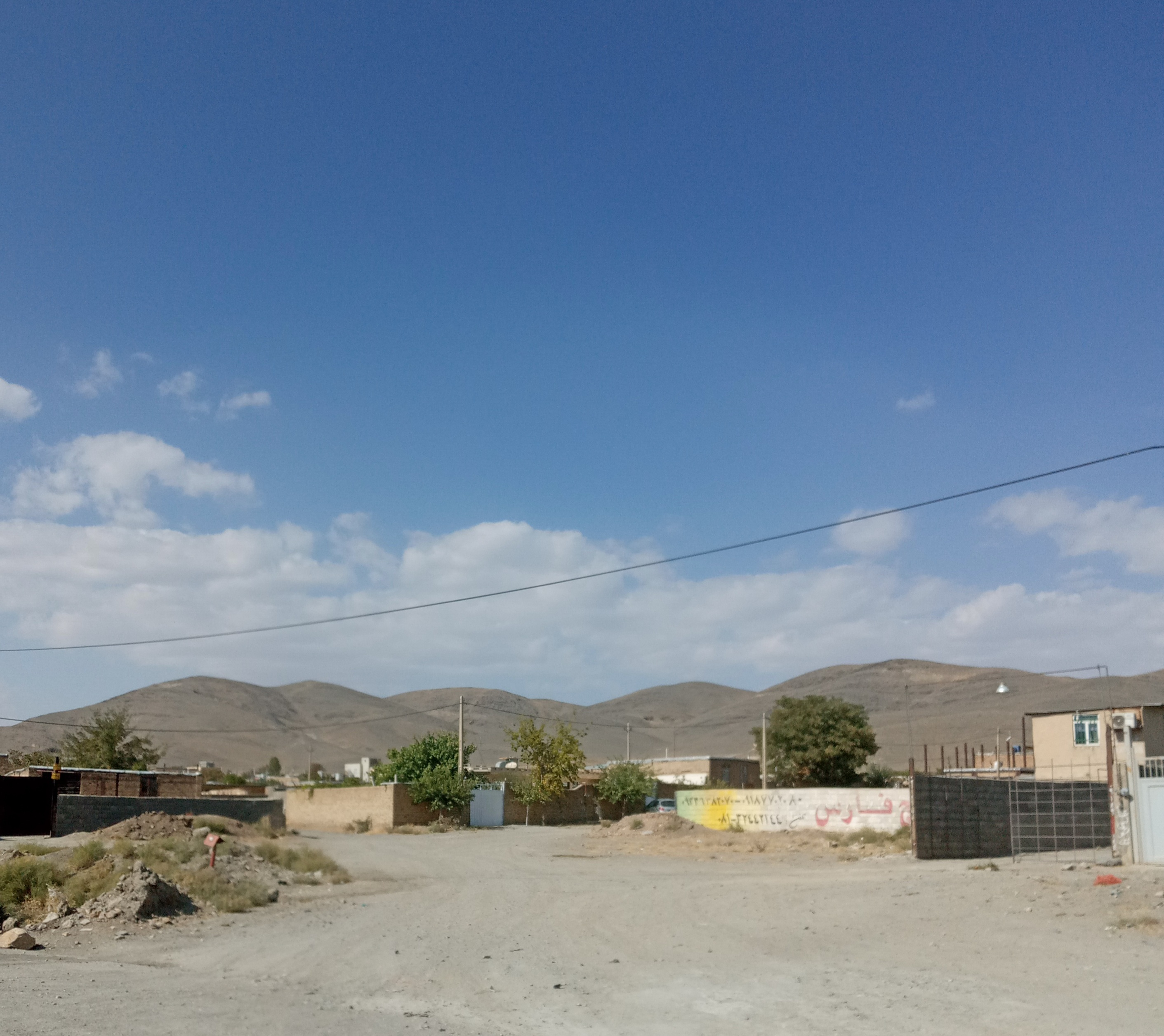
- The village of Mehrabad

- Location within Iran
- Coordinates: 34°19′50″N 48°44′32″E
- Country: Iran
- Province: Hamadan
- County: Malayer
- District: Central
- Rural District: Haram Rud-e Olya

Population (2016)
  - Total: 550
- Time zone: UTC+3:30 (IRST)

Mehrabad (Persian: مهراباد) (Note: Also romanized as Mahrābād and Mehrābād; also known as Mīhrābād) is a village in, and the capital of, Haram Rud-e Olya Rural District in the Central District of Malayer County, Hamadan province, Iran.

== Demographics ==
=== Population ===
At the time of the 2006 National Census, the village's population was 696 in 176 households. The following census in 2011 counted 704 people in 205 households. The 2016 census measured the population of the village as 550 people in 173 households.
