= Zamanabad, Malayer =

Village in Hamadan province, Iran

Zamanabad Persian: زمان اباد
- Village
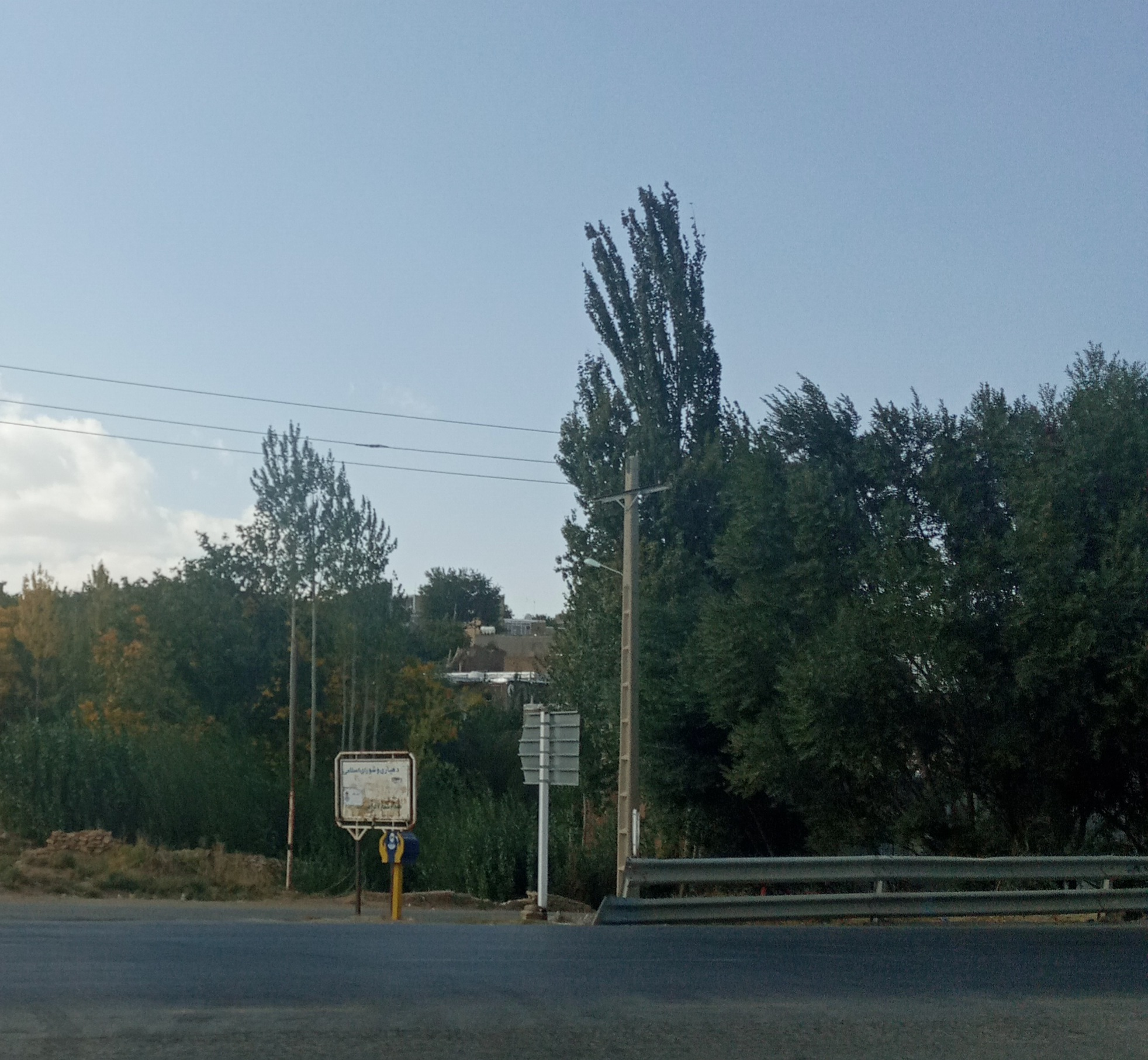
- The village of Zamanabad

- Location within Iran
- Coordinates: 34°35′48″N 48°44′05″E
- Country: Iran
- Province: Hamadan
- County: Malayer
- District: Jowkar
- Rural District: Tork-e Gharbi

Population (2016)
  - Total: 1,238
- Time zone: UTC+3:30 (IRST)

Zamanabad (Persian: زمان اباد) (Note: Also romanized as Zamānābād; also known as Zamānābād-e Emām Qolīkhān) is a village in Tork-e Gharbi Rural District of Jowkar District in Malayer County, Hamadan province, Iran.

== Demographics ==
=== Population ===
At the time of the 2006 National Census, the village's population was 1,307 in 270 households. The following census in 2011 counted 1,415 people in 328 households. The 2016 census measured the population of the village as 1,238 people in 361 households.
