= Tucheghaz =

Village in Hamadan province, Iran

Tucheghaz Persian: توچغاز
- Village
- Location within Iran
- Coordinates: 34°17′59″N 48°42′54″E
- Country: Iran
- Province: Hamadan
- County: Malayer
- District: Central
- Rural District: Haram Rud-e Olya

Population (2016)
  - Total: 1,554
- Time zone: UTC+3:30 (IRST)

Tucheghaz (Persian: توچغاز) (Note: Also romanized as Tuchaghaz, Tūchaghāz and Tūcheghāz; formerly known as Tuchaqaz (توچقاز), also romanized as Tūchaqāz and Tūcheqāz; also known as Tūcheh Ghāz) is a village in Haram Rud-e Olya Rural District of the Central District in Malayer County, Hamadan province, Iran.

== Demographics ==
=== Population ===
At the time of the 2006 National Census, the village's population, as Tuchaqaz, was 2,090 in 573 households. The following census in 2011 counted 1,925 people in 590 households. The 2016 census measured the population of the village as 1,554 people in 520 households, by which time it was listed as Tucheghaz.
