= Qajar Ab-e Sofla =

Qajar Ab-e Sofla قجراب سفلي
- Village
- Location within Iran
- Coordinates: 34°26′07″N 48°58′31″E
- Country: Iran
- Province: Hamadan
- County: Malayer
- Bakhsh: Central
- Rural District: Kuh Sardeh

Population (2006)
  - Total: 50
- Time zone: UTC+3:30 (IRST)
  - Summer (DST): UTC+4:30 (IRDT)

Qajar Ab-e Sofla (Persian: قجراب سفلي, also Romanized as Qajar Āb-e Soflá; also known as Qajarāb and Qajar Āb) is a village in Kuh Sardeh Rural District, in the Central District of Malayer County, Hamadan Province, Iran. At the 2006 census, its population was 50, in 13 families.
