= Hoseynabad-e Shamlu =

Village in Hamadan province, Iran

Hoseynabad-e Shamlu Persian: حسين اباد شاملو
- Village
- Location within Iran
- Coordinates: 34°26′46″N 48°37′14″E
- Country: Iran
- Province: Hamadan
- County: Malayer
- District: Jowkar
- Rural District: Almahdi

Population (2016)
  - Total: 1,799
- Time zone: UTC+3:30 (IRST)

Hoseynabad-e Shamlu (Persian: حسين اباد شاملو) (Note: Also romanized as Ḩoseynābād-e Shāmlū; also known as Ḩasanābād-e Shāmlū, Ḩoseynābād, and Hūsaīnābād) is a village in, and the capital of, Almahdi Rural District in Jowkar District of Malayer County, Hamadan province, Iran.

== Demographics ==
=== Population ===
At the time of the 2006 National Census, the village's population was 2,215 in 613 households. The following census in 2011 counted 2,363 people in 684 households. The 2016 census measured the population of the village as 1,799 people in 592 households.
