= Marvil =

Village in Hamadan province, Iran

Marvil Persian: مرويل
- Village
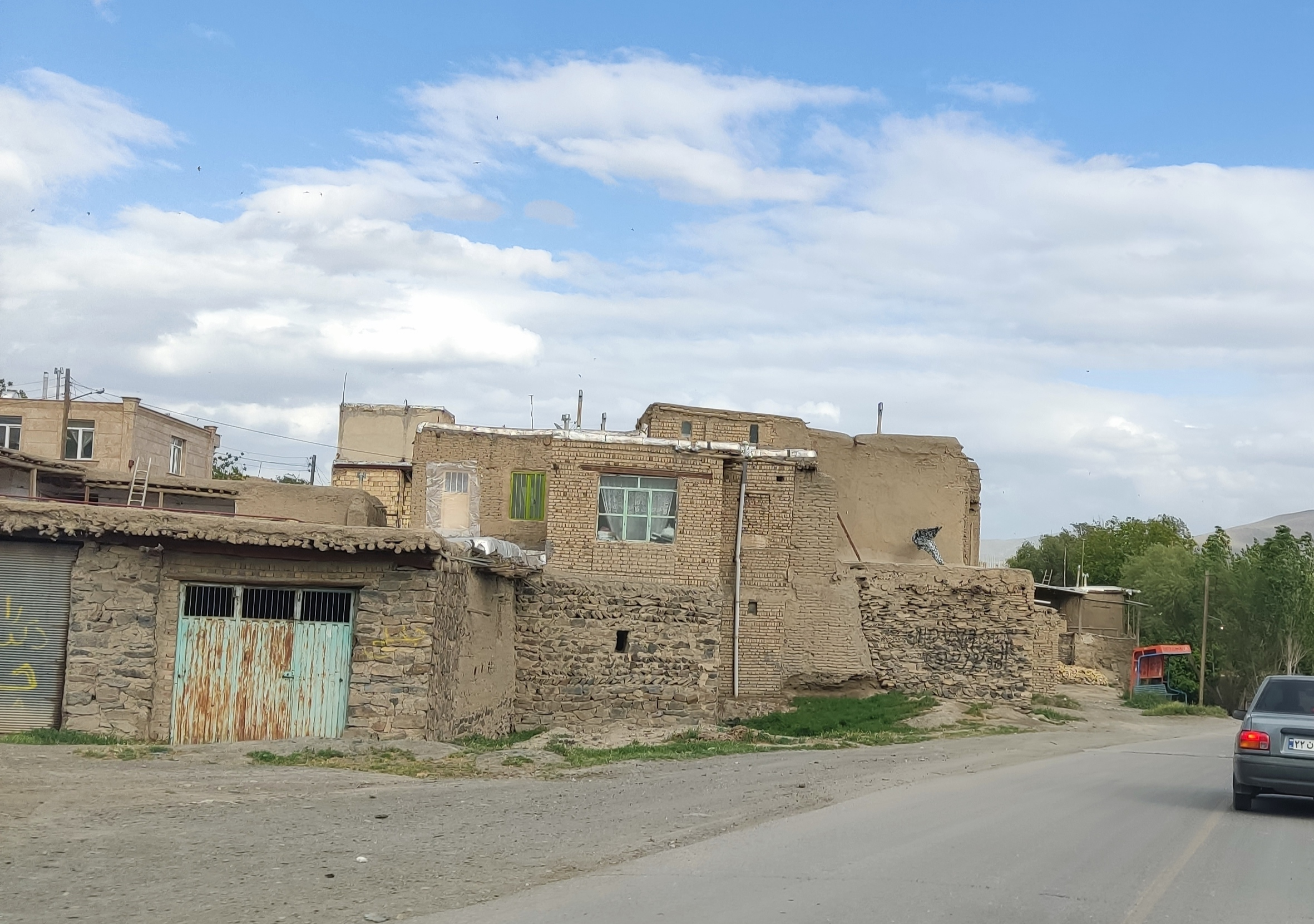
- The village of Marvil

- Location within Iran
- Coordinates: 34°10′07″N 48°53′14″E
- Country: Iran
- Province: Hamadan
- County: Malayer
- District: Central
- Rural District: Muzaran

Population (2016)
  - Total: 339
- Time zone: UTC+3:30 (IRST)

Marvil (Persian: مرويل) (Note: Also romanized as Marvīl) is a village in Muzaran Rural District of the Central District in Malayer County, Hamadan province, Iran.

== Demographics ==
=== Population ===
At the time of the 2006 National Census, the village's population was 392 in 101 households. The following census in 2011 counted 427 people in 122 households. The 2016 census measured the population of the village as 339 people in 107 households.
