= Kusaj Khalil =

Village in Hamadan province, Iran

Kusaj Khalil Persian: كوسج خليل
- Village
- Location within Iran
- Coordinates: 34°24′15″N 48°35′17″E
- Country: Iran
- Province: Hamadan
- County: Malayer
- District: Jowkar
- Rural District: Almahdi

Population (2016)
  - Total: 192
- Time zone: UTC+3:30 (IRST)

Kusaj Khalil (Persian: كوسج خليل) (Note: Also romanized as Koosej Khalil, Kūsaj Khalīl, and Kūsaj-e Khalīl; also known as Kūseh Khalīl, Kūseh-ye Khalīl, and Kūsh Khalīl) is a village in Almahdi Rural District of Jowkar District in Malayer County, Hamadan province, Iran.

== Demographics ==
=== Population ===
At the time of the 2006 National Census, the village's population was 332 in 75 households. The following census in 2011 counted 248 people in 66 households. The 2016 census measured the population of the village as 192 people in 63 households.
