= Hasanabad-e Qush Bolagh =

Village in Hamadan province, Iran

Hasanabad-e Qush Bolagh Persian: حسن ابادقوش بلاغ
- Village
- Location within Iran
- Coordinates: 34°25′24″N 48°39′16″E
- Country: Iran
- Province: Hamadan
- County: Malayer
- District: Jowkar
- Rural District: Almahdi

Population (2016)
  - Total: 169
- Time zone: UTC+3:30 (IRST)

Hasanabad-e Qush Bolagh (Persian: حسن ابادقوش بلاغ) (Note: Also romanized as Ḩasanābād-e Qūsh Bolāgh and Hasanābād-e Qūsh Bolāgh; also known as Ḩasanābād-e Qeshlaq, Ḩoseynābād-e Qosh Bolāgh, and Ḩasanābād-e Qoshbolāgh) is a village in Almahdi Rural District of Jowkar District in Malayer County, Hamadan province, Iran.

== Demographics ==
=== Population ===
At the time of the 2006 National Census, the village's population was 233 in 58 households. The following census in 2011 counted 176 people in 55 households. The 2016 census measured the population of the village as 169 people in 57 households.
