= Rezvankadeh =

Village in Hamadan province, Iran

Rezvankadeh Persian: رضوانكده
- Village
- Location within Iran
- Coordinates: 34°14′25″N 48°49′39″E
- Country: Iran
- Province: Hamadan
- County: Malayer
- District: Central
- Rural District: Muzaran

Population (2016)
  - Total: 1,618
- Time zone: UTC+3:30 (IRST)

Rezvankadeh (Persian: رضوانكده) (Note: Also romanized as Reẕvānkadeh formerly known as Meyabad (می‌آباد)) is a village in Muzaran Rural District of the Central District in Malayer County, Hamadan province, Iran.

== Demographics ==
=== Population ===
At the time of the 2006 National Census, the village's population was 1,885 in 495 households. The following census in 2011 counted 1,727 people in 538 households. The 2016 census measured the population of the village as 1,618 people in 534 households.
