= Sang-e Sefid-e Nanaj =

Village in Hamadan province, Iran

Sang-e Sefid-e Nanaj Persian: سنگ سفيدننج
- Village
- Location within Iran
- Coordinates: 34°26′15″N 48°45′15″E
- Country: Iran
- Province: Hamadan
- County: Malayer
- District: Jowkar
- Rural District: Jowkar

Population (2016)
  - Total: 152
- Time zone: UTC+3:30 (IRST)

Sang-e Sefid-e Nanaj (Persian: سنگ سفيدننج) (Note: Also romanized as Sang-e Sefīd-e Nanaj; also known as Sangsefīd) is a village in Jowkar Rural District of Jowkar District in Malayer County, Hamadan province, Iran.

== Demographics ==
=== Population ===
At the time of the 2006 National Census, the village's population was 254 in 49 households. The following census in 2011 counted 193 people in 52 households. The 2016 census measured the population of the village as 152 people in 49 households.
