= Zamanabad-e Mohammadabad =

Village in Hamadan province, Iran

Zamanabad-e Mohammadabad Persian: زمان ابادمحمداباد
- Village
- Location within Iran
- Coordinates: 34°24′45″N 48°38′32″E
- Country: Iran
- Province: Hamadan
- County: Malayer
- District: Jowkar
- Rural District: Almahdi

Population (2016)
  - Total: 44
- Time zone: UTC+3:30 (IRST)

Zamanabad-e Mohammadabad (Persian: زمان ابادمحمداباد) (Note: Also romanized as Zamānābād-e Moḩammadābād) is a village in Almahdi Rural District of Jowkar District in Malayer County, Hamadan province, Iran.

== Demographics ==
=== Population ===
At the time of the 2006 National Census, the village's population was 118 in 37 households. The following census in 2011 counted 92 people in 29 households. The 2016 census measured the population of the village as 44 people in 14 households.
