= Mangavi =

Village in Hamadan province, Iran

Mangavi Persian: منگاوي
- Village
- Location within Iran
- Coordinates: 34°39′27″N 48°42′29″E
- Country: Iran
- Province: Hamadan
- County: Malayer
- District: Jowkar
- Rural District: Tork-e Gharbi

Population (2016)
  - Total: 2,063
- Time zone: UTC+3:30 (IRST)

Mangavi (Persian: منگاوي) (Note: Also romanized as Mangāvī; also known as Mankāvī) is a village in Tork-e Gharbi Rural District of Jowkar District in Malayer County, Hamadan province, Iran.

== Demographics ==
=== Population ===
At the time of the 2006 National Census, the village's population was 1,934 in 459 households. The following census in 2011 counted 1,764 people in 511 households. The 2016 census measured the population of the village as 2,063 people in 619 households.
