= Qajar Ab =

Qajar Ab and Qajarab (Persian: قجراب) may refer to:

- Qajar Ab-e Olya
- Qajar Ab-e Sofla
