= Karkan, Hamadan =

Village in Hamadan province, Iran

Karkan Persian: كركان
- Village
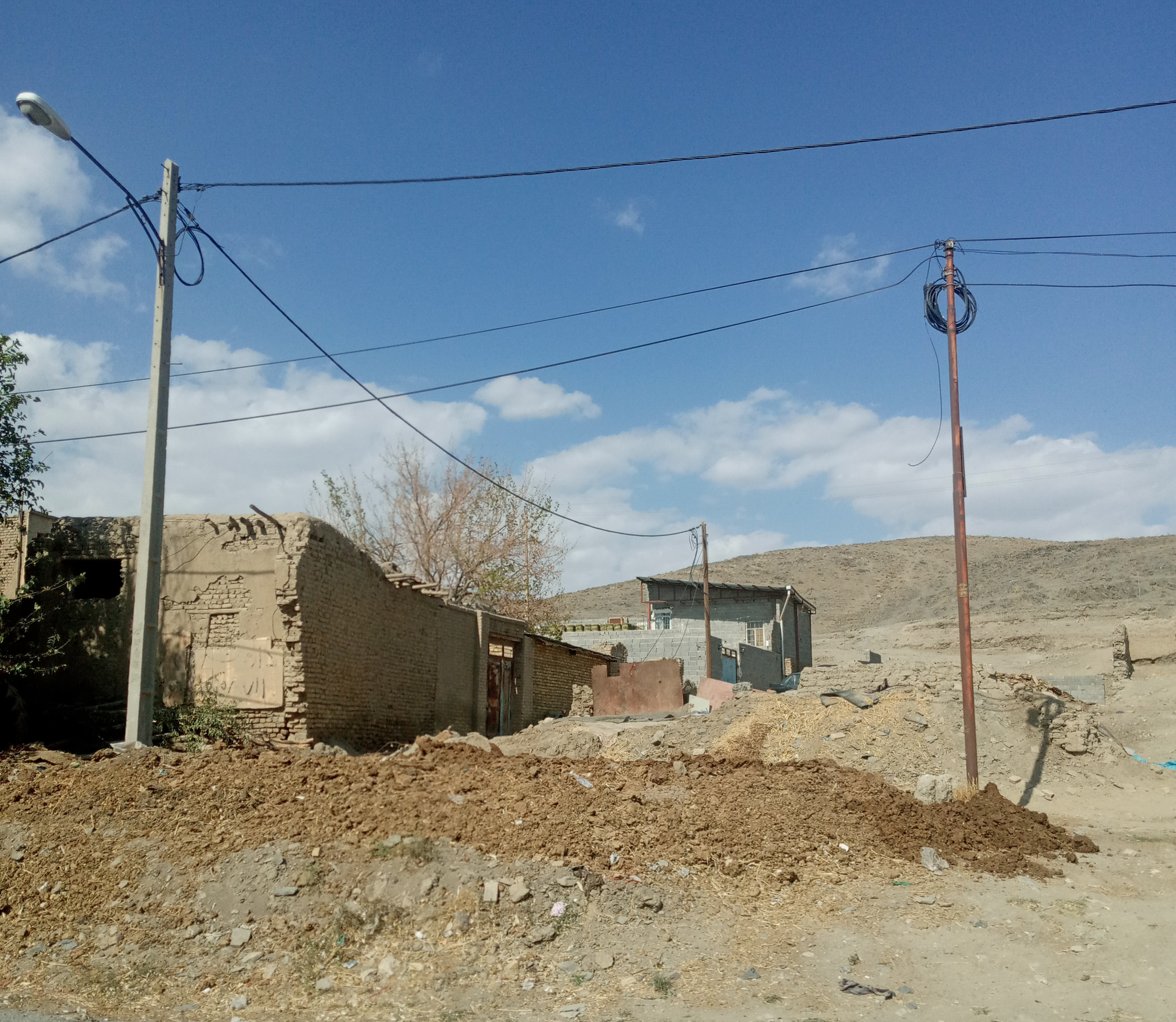
- The village of Karkan

- Location within Iran
- Coordinates: 34°20′55″N 48°42′05″E
- Country: Iran
- Province: Hamadan
- County: Malayer
- District: Central
- Rural District: Haram Rud-e Olya

Population (2016)
  - Total: 283
- Time zone: UTC+3:30 (IRST)

Karkan (Persian: كركان) (Note: Also romanized as Karakan and Karkān; also known as Gargan and Garkan) is a village in Haram Rud-e Olya Rural District of the Central District in Malayer County, Hamadan province, Iran.

== Demographics ==
=== Population ===
At the time of the 2006 National Census, the village's population was 350 in 98 households. The following census in 2011 counted 340 people in 104 households. The 2016 census measured the population of the village as 283 people in 94 households.
