= Tusk (disambiguation) =

A tusk is an elongated tooth possessed by certain mammals.

Tusk may also refer to:

== People ==
- Donald Tusk (born 1957), Polish politician, Prime Minister of Poland and former President of the European Council
- Eberhard Koebel (1907–1955), also known as tusk, German writer and publisher
- Józef Tusk (1907–1987), grandfather of Donald
- Máel Brigte of Moray (fl. 9th century), known as Máel Brigte Tusk, Pictish nobleman
- Michael Tusk (born 1964), American chef, restaurateur
- Tusks (musician), English singer
- Tusk, Japanese musician and vocalist of the rock band Zi:Kill

== Arts and entertainment ==
=== Music ===
- Tusk (album), a 1979 album by Fleetwood Mac
  - "Tusk" (song), a 1979 song by Fleetwood Mac
  - Tusk Tour, a 1979–1980 tour by Fleetwood Mac
- Tusk (Camper Van Beethoven album), a 2002 rerecording of the Fleetwood Mac album
- Tusk (The Dead C album), 1997

=== Film and television ===
- Tusk (1980 film), a film by Alejandro Jodorowsky
- Tusk (2014 film), a film by Kevin Smith
- "Tusk", the fifth episode of Perfect Hair Forever

=== Fictional characters ===
- Raymond Tusk, a billionaire industrialist and éminence grise in the American TV series House of Cards
- Tusk, a character from Doubutsu Sentai Zyuohger
- Tusk rapper, a character from the Black Mirror episode "Hated in the Nation"
- Tusk (Marvel Comics), a character in Marvel Comics
- Tusk (DC Comics), a character in DC Comics
- Tusk (Killer Instinct), a character in the 1996 arcade game Killer Instinct 2
- "Tusk", a character from Cross Ange
- "Tusk", Johnny Joestar's Stand in Steel Ball Run, named after the 1979 song by Fleetwood Mac

== Biology ==
- Cusk (fish), or tusk fish (Brosme brosme), a fish of the ling family
- Tusk shell (Scaphopoda), a class of marine mollusks

== Geography ==
- Tusk-e Olya, a village in Hamadan Province, Iran
- Tusk-e Sofla, a village in Hamadan Province, Iran
- The Tusk (Alaska), a summit in the Coast Mountains, Alaska
- The Tusk, a marble peak in the Ross Dependency, Antarctica
- The Black Tusk, a peak in the Garibaldi Provincial Park, British Columbia, Canada

== Other ==
- Tusk (mascot), the live mascot for the University of Arkansas, United States
- Tusk Trust, a British non-profit organisation
- USS Tusk (SS-426), an American submarine
- Tank Urban Survival Kit, an upgrade package to improve the effectiveness of the M1A2 Abrams tank in urban warfare
- TUSK (Tell Utilities Solar won’t be Killed), a group chaired by Barry Goldwater, Jr.
- TUSK, acronym for Tethered Undersea Kites, a type of underwater renewable energy system that uses tethered kites to harvest energy from ocean currents

== See also ==
- Tusker
