= Nanaj =

Village in Hamadan province, Iran

Nanaj Persian: ننج
- Village
- Location within Iran
- Coordinates: 34°25′12″N 48°45′14″E
- Country: Iran
- Province: Hamadan
- County: Malayer
- District: Jowkar
- Rural District: Jowkar

Population (2016)
  - Total: 669
- Time zone: UTC+3:30 (IRST)

Nanaj (Persian: ننج) (Note: Also romanized as Nannaj and Nanoj; also known as Nahenjeh) is a village in Jowkar Rural District of Jowkar District in Malayer County, Hamadan province, Iran.

== Demographics ==
=== Language ===
The local language of the village is a Persian variety influenced by Kurdish and Luri.

=== Population ===
At the time of the 2006 National Census, the village's population was 778 in 198 households. The following census in 2011 counted 793 people in 194 households. The 2016 census measured the population of the village as 669 people in 184 households.
