= Farvaz =

Village in Hamadan province, Iran

Farvaz Persian: فروز
- Village
- Location within Iran
- Coordinates: 34°13′34″N 48°54′01″E
- Country: Iran
- Province: Hamadan
- County: Malayer
- District: Central
- Rural District: Muzaran

Population (2016)
  - Total: 456
- Time zone: UTC+3:30 (IRST)

Farvaz (Persian: فروز) (Note: Also known as Farvar) is a village in Muzaran Rural District of the Central District in Malayer County, Hamadan province, Iran.

== Demographics ==
=== Population ===
At the time of the 2006 National Census, the village's population was 456 in 131 households. The following census in 2011 counted 451 people in 143 households. The 2016 census measured the population of the village as 456 people in 154 households.
