= Namileh =

Village in Hamadan province, Iran

Namileh Persian: ناميله
- Village
- Location within Iran
- Coordinates: 34°16′21″N 48°49′13″E
- Country: Iran
- Province: Hamadan
- County: Malayer
- District: Central
- Rural District: Muzaran

Population (2016)
  - Total: 2,998
- Time zone: UTC+3:30 (IRST)

Namileh (Persian: ناميله) (Note: Also romanized as Nāmīleh; also known as Nāmleh) is a village in Muzaran Rural District of the Central District in Malayer County, Hamadan province, Iran.

== Demographics ==
=== Population ===
At the time of the 2006 National Census, the village's population was 1,539 in 400 households. The following census in 2011 counted 3,010 people in 908 households. The 2016 census measured the population of the village as 2,998 people in 908 households, the most populous in its rural district.
