= Abbasiyeh, Hamadan =

Village in Hamadan province, Iran

Abbasiyeh Persian: عباسيه
- Village
- Location within Iran
- Coordinates: 34°11′48″N 48°52′12″E
- Country: Iran
- Province: Hamadan
- County: Malayer
- District: Central
- Rural District: Muzaran

Population (2016)
  - Total: 445
- Time zone: UTC+3:30 (IRST)

Abbasiyeh (Persian: عباسيه) (Note: Also romanized as Abbāsīyeh; formerly known as Bijanabad (بیجن‌آباد); also known as ‘Abbāsābād) is a village in Muzaran Rural District of the Central District in Malayer County, Hamadan province, Iran.

== Demographics ==
=== Population ===
At the time of the 2006 National Census, the village's population was 488 in 132 households. The following census in 2011 counted 494 people in 147 households. The 2016 census measured the population of the village as 445 people in 132 households.
