= Varchaq =

Village in Hamadan province, Iran

Varchaq Persian: ورچق
- Village
- Location within Iran
- Coordinates: 34°22′19″N 48°53′52″E
- Country: Iran
- Province: Hamadan
- County: Malayer
- District: Central
- Rural District: Kuh Sardeh

Population (2016)
  - Total: 532
- Time zone: UTC+3:30 (IRST)

Varchaq (Persian: ورچق) (Note: Also known as Varcha and Warcha) is a village in Kuh Sardeh Rural District of the Central District in Malayer County, Hamadan province, Iran.

== Demographics ==
=== Population ===
At the time of the 2006 National Census, the village's population was 565 in 133 households. The following census in 2011 counted 695 people in 194 households. The 2016 census measured the population of the village as 532 people in 152 households.
