= Kand Halan =

Village in Hamadan province, Iran

Kand Halan Persian: كندهلان
- Village
- Location within Iran
- Coordinates: 34°30′04″N 48°46′55″E
- Country: Iran
- Province: Hamadan
- County: Malayer
- District: Jowkar
- Rural District: Jowkar

Population (2016)
  - Total: 258
- Time zone: UTC+3:30 (IRST)

Kand Halan (Persian: كندهلان) (Note: Also romanized as Kand Halān, Kand Helān and Kandehlān; also known as Kandelān, Kandelan, Kandlān, and Khiāndelan) is a village in Jowkar Rural District of Jowkar District in Malayer County, Hamadan province, Iran.

== Demographics ==
=== Population ===
At the time of the 2006 National Census, the village's population was 563 in 123 households. The following census in 2011 counted 401 people in 112 households. The 2016 census measured the population of the village as 258 people in 85 households.
