= Qajar Ab-e Olya =

Qajar Ab-e Olya قجراب عليا
- Village
- Location within Iran
- Coordinates: 34°25′40″N 48°58′13″E
- Country: Iran
- Province: Hamadan
- County: Malayer
- Bakhsh: Central
- Rural District: Kuh Sardeh

Population (2006)
  - Total: 188
- Time zone: UTC+3:30 (IRST)
  - Summer (DST): UTC+4:30 (IRDT)

Qajar Ab-e Olya (Persian: قجراب عليا, also Romanized as Qajar Āb-e ‘Olyā; also known as Qajar Āb) is a village in Kuh Sardeh Rural District, in the Central District of Malayer County, Hamadan Province, Iran. At the 2006 census, its population was 188, in 45 families.
