= Dehnow-e Aliabad =

Village in Hamadan province, Iran

Dehnow-e Aliabad Persian: ده نوعلي اباد
- Village
- Location within Iran
- Coordinates: 34°28′55″N 48°37′58″E
- Country: Iran
- Province: Hamadan
- County: Malayer
- District: Jowkar
- Rural District: Almahdi

Population (2016)
  - Total: 1,210
- Time zone: UTC+3:30 (IRST)

Dehnow-e Aliabad (Persian: ده نوعلي اباد) (Note: Also romanized as Deh Now ‘Alīābād and Dehnow-e ‘Alīābād; also known as Deh Now) is a village in Almahdi Rural District of Jowkar District in Malayer County, Hamadan province, Iran.

== Demographics ==
=== Population ===
At the time of the 2006 National Census, the village's population was 1,417 in 334 households. The following census in 2011 counted 1,378 people in 368 households. The 2016 census measured the population of the village as 1,210 people in 384 households.
