= Sib Dar =

Village in Hamadan province, Iran

Sib Dar Persian: سيبدر
- Village
- Location within Iran
- Coordinates: 34°13′01″N 48°47′05″E
- Country: Iran
- Province: Hamadan
- County: Malayer
- District: Central
- Rural District: Muzaran

Population (2016)
  - Total: 12
- Time zone: UTC+3:30 (IRST)

Sib Dar (Persian: سيبدر) (Note: Also romanized as Sīb Dar) is a village in Muzaran Rural District of the Central District in Malayer County, Hamadan province, Iran.

== Demographics ==
=== Population ===
At the time of the 2006 National Census, the village's population was 15 in six households. The 2016 census measured the population of the village as 12 people in five households.
