= Alfavet =

Village in Hamadan province, Iran

Alfavet Persian: الفاوت
- Village
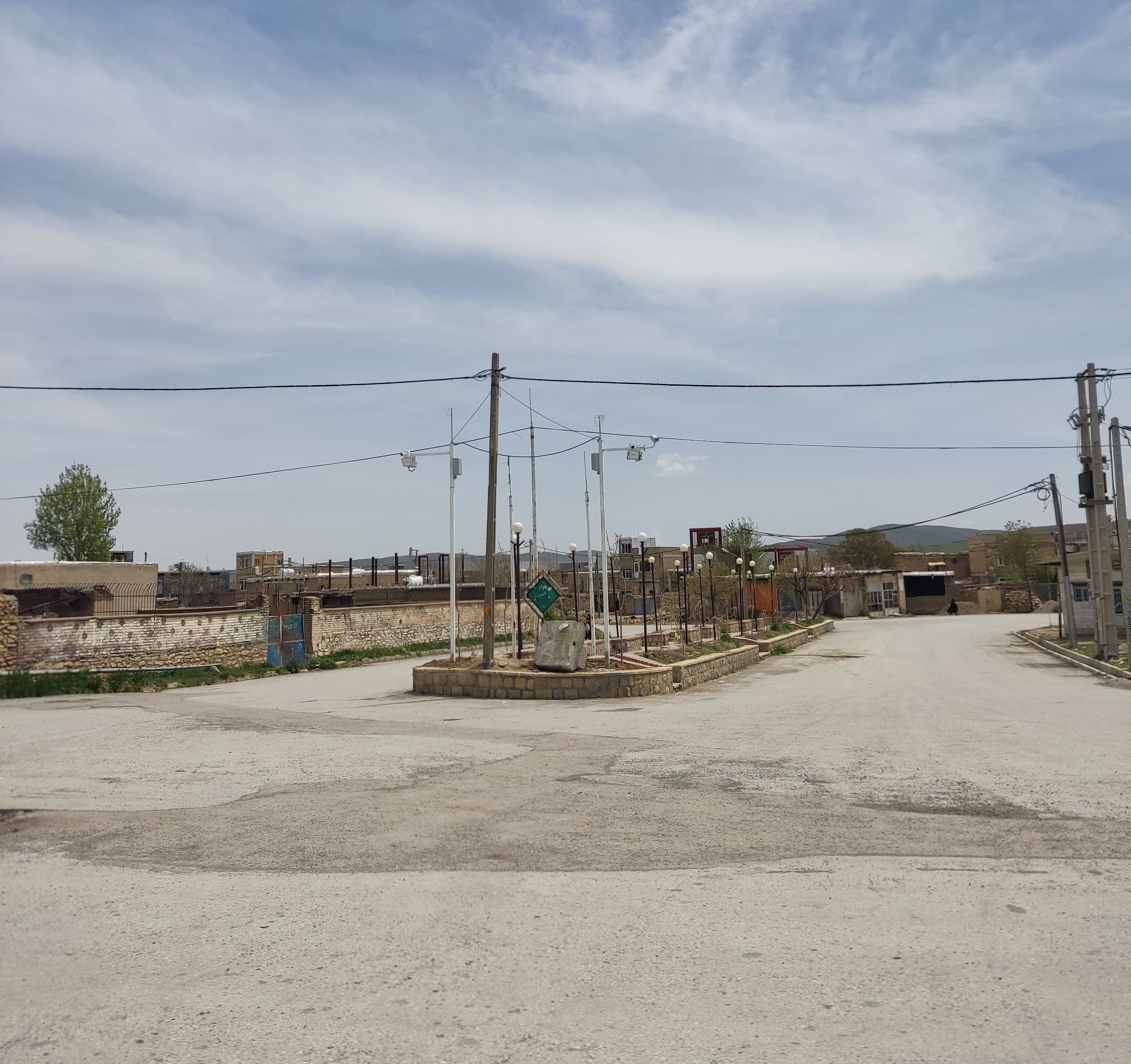
- The village of Alfavet

- Location within Iran
- Coordinates: 34°38′21″N 48°44′59″E
- Country: Iran
- Province: Hamadan
- County: Malayer
- District: Jowkar
- Rural District: Tork-e Gharbi

Population (2016)
  - Total: 1,258
- Time zone: UTC+3:30 (IRST)

Alfavet (Persian: الفاوت) (Note: Also romanized as Alfāvet and Alfāvot; also known as Alfāāvot, Alfāūt, Alfāūūt, Alfavut, and Alfāvūt) is a village in Tork-e Gharbi Rural District of Jowkar District in Malayer County, Hamadan province, Iran.

== Demographics ==
=== Population ===
At the time of the 2006 National Census, the village's population was 1,334 in 335 households. The following census in 2011 counted 1,306 people in 340 households. The 2016 census measured the population of the village as 1,258 people in 386 households.
