= Hajjiabad, Malayer =

Village in Hamadan province, Iran

Hajjiabad Persian: حاجي اباد
- Village
- Location within Iran
- Coordinates: 34°19′26″N 48°46′31″E
- Country: Iran
- Province: Hamadan
- County: Malayer
- District: Central
- Rural District: Haram Rud-e Olya

Population (2016)
  - Total: 1,877
- Time zone: UTC+3:30 (IRST)

Hajjiabad (Persian: حاجي اباد) (Note: Also romanized as Ḩājīābād and Hājjīābād) is a village in Haram Rud-e Olya Rural District of the Central District in Malayer County, Hamadan province, Iran.

== Demographics ==
=== Population ===
At the time of the 2006 National Census, the village's population was 1,354 in 353 households. The following census in 2011 counted 1,630 people in 479 households. The 2016 census measured the population of the village as 1,877 people in 536 households, the most populous in its rural district.
