= Emamzadeh Abdollah, Hamadan =

Village in Hamadan province, Iran

Emamzadeh Abdollah Persian: امامزاده عبداله
- Village
- Location within Iran
- Coordinates: 34°27′43″N 48°56′41″E
- Country: Iran
- Province: Hamadan
- County: Malayer
- District: Central
- Rural District: Kuh Sardeh

Population (2016)
  - Total: 314
- Time zone: UTC+3:30 (IRST)

Emamzadeh Abdollah (Persian: امامزاده عبداله) (Note: Also romanized as Emāmzādeh ʿAbdollah; formerly known as Khānābād (خان اباد)) is a village in Kuh Sardeh Rural District of the Central District in Malayer County, Hamadan province, Iran.

== Demographics ==
=== Population ===
At the time of the 2006 National Census, the village's population was 353 in 78 households. The following census in 2011 counted 331 people in 86 households. The 2016 census measured the population of the village as 314 people in 94 households.
