= Gol Gol, Hamadan =

Village in Hamadan province, Iran

Gol Gol Persian: گل گل
- Village
- Location within Iran
- Coordinates: 34°14′35″N 49°06′12″E
- Country: Iran
- Province: Hamadan
- County: Malayer
- District: Central
- Rural District: Jowzan

Population (2016)
  - Total: 7
- Time zone: UTC+3:30 (IRST)

Gol Gol (Persian: گل گل) (Note: Also known as Kulkul) is a village in Jowzan Rural District of the Central District in Malayer County, Hamadan province, Iran.

== Demographics ==
=== Population ===
At the time of the 2006 National Census, the village's population was 16 in six households. The following census in 2011 counted a population below the reporting threshold. The 2016 census measured the population of the village as seven people in four households.
