= Qarah Tegini =

Village in Hamadan province, Iran

Qarah Tegini Persian: قره تگيني
- Village
- Location within Iran
- Coordinates: 34°26′24″N 48°56′06″E
- Country: Iran
- Province: Hamadan
- County: Malayer
- District: Central
- Rural District: Kuh Sardeh

Population (2016)
  - Total: 232
- Time zone: UTC+3:30 (IRST)

Qarah Tegini (Persian: قره تگيني) (Note: Also romanized as Qarah Tegīnī and Qareh Tegīnī; also known as Qarā Tegīneh, Qarā Tīgenī, Qarātgīni, and Qaratīni) is a village in Kuh Sardeh Rural District of the Central District in Malayer County, Hamadan province, Iran.

== Demographics ==
=== Population ===
At the time of the 2006 National Census, the village's population was 263 in 75 households. The following census in 2011 counted 207 people in 63 households. The 2016 census measured the population of the village as 232 people in 80 households.
