= Yengi Kand, Hamadan =

Village in Hamadan province, Iran

Yengi Kand Persian: ينگي كند
- Village
- Location within Iran
- Coordinates: 34°37′07″N 48°42′57″E
- Country: Iran
- Province: Hamadan
- County: Malayer
- District: Jowkar
- Rural District: Tork-e Gharbi

Population (2016)
  - Total: 2,638
- Time zone: UTC+3:30 (IRST)

Yengi Kand (Persian: ينگي كند) (Note: Also romanized as Yengī Kand; formerly known as Deh Now-e Asadollāh Khān (ده نواسداله خان), Deh Now-e Asdollāh Khān, and Deh Now-ye Asdollāh Khān) is a village in, and the capital of, Tork-e Gharbi Rural District in Jowkar District of Malayer County, Hamadan province, Iran.

== Demographics ==
=== Population ===
At the time of the 2006 National Census, the village's population was 2,057 in 507 households. The following census in 2011 counted 2,236 people in 609 households. The 2016 census measured the population of the village as 2,638 people in 782 households, the most populous in its rural district.
