= Qaleh-ye Baba Khan =

Village in Hamadan province, Iran

Qaleh-ye Baba Khan Persian: قلعه باباخان
- Village
- Location within Iran
- Coordinates: 34°14′51″N 49°02′27″E
- Country: Iran
- Province: Hamadan
- County: Malayer
- District: Central
- Rural District: Jowzan

Population (2016)
  - Total: 263
- Time zone: UTC+3:30 (IRST)

Qaleh-ye Baba Khan (Persian: قلعه باباخان) (Note: Also romanized as Qal‘eh Bābā Khān, Qal‘eh Bābākhān, and Qāl‘eh-ye Bābā Khān; formerly known as Ḩeşār-e Bābākhān) is a village in Jowzan Rural District of the Central District of Malayer County, Hamadan province, Iran.

== Demographics ==
=== Population ===
At the time of the 2006 National Census, the village's population was 403 in 131 households. The following census in 2011 counted 306 people in 114 households. The 2016 census measured the population of the village as 263 people in 102 households.
