= Zirabiyeh =

Village in Hamadan province, Iran

Zirabiyeh Persian: زيرابيه
- Village
- Location within Iran
- Coordinates: 34°24′48″N 48°37′01″E
- Country: Iran
- Province: Hamadan
- County: Malayer
- District: Jowkar
- Rural District: Almahdi

Population (2016)
  - Total: 113
- Time zone: UTC+3:30 (IRST)

Zirabiyeh (Persian: زيرابيه) (Note: Also romanized as Zīr Ābīyeh, Zīrābīyeh, and Zīrābyeh; also known as Zīrīneh) is a village in Almahdi Rural District of Jowkar District in Malayer County, Hamadan province, Iran.

== Demographics ==
=== Population ===
At the time of the 2006 National Census, the village's population was 168 in 38 households. The following census in 2011 counted 143 people in 37 households. The 2016 census measured the population of the village as 113 people in 36 households.
