= Qaleh-ye Jowzan =

Village in Hamadan province, Iran

Qaleh-ye Jowzan Persian: قلعه جوزان
- Village
- Location within Iran
- Coordinates: 34°14′48″N 48°57′43″E
- Country: Iran
- Province: Hamadan
- County: Malayer
- District: Central
- Rural District: Jowzan

Population (2016)
  - Total: 519
- Time zone: UTC+3:30 (IRST)

Qaleh-ye Jowzan (Persian: قلعه جوزان) (Note: Also romanized as Qal‘eh-ye Jowzān; also known as Qalehjowzān) is a village in Jowzan Rural District of the Central District in Malayer County, Hamadan province, Iran.

== Demographics ==
=== Population ===
At the time of the 2006 National Census, the village's population was 582 in 145 households. The following census in 2011 counted 547 people in 152 households. The 2016 census measured the population of the village as 519 people in 153 households.
