= Haramabad =

Village in Hamadan province, Iran

Haramabad Persian: حرم اباد
- Village
- Location within Iran
- Coordinates: 34°16′52″N 48°46′55″E
- Country: Iran
- Province: Hamadan
- County: Malayer
- District: Central
- Rural District: Haram Rud-e Olya

Population (2016)
  - Total: 947
- Time zone: UTC+3:30 (IRST)

Haramabad (Persian: حرم اباد) (Note: Also romanized as Ḩaramābād; also known as Khorramābād) is a village in Haram Rud-e Olya Rural District of the Central District in Malayer County, Hamadan province, Iran.

== Demographics ==
=== Population ===
At the time of the 2006 National Census, the village's population was 1,180 in 293 households. The following census in 2011 counted 1,114 people in 343 households. The 2016 census measured the population of the village as 947 people in 304 households.
