= Davijan =

Village in Hamadan province, Iran

Davijan Persian: داويجان
- Village
- Location within Iran
- Coordinates: 34°13′13″N 48°51′30″E
- Country: Iran
- Province: Hamadan
- County: Malayer
- District: Central
- Rural District: Muzaran

Population (2016)
  - Total: 1,200
- Time zone: UTC+3:30 (IRST)

Davijan (Persian: داويجان) (Note: Also romanized as Dāvījān; also known as Dāvān) is a village in Muzaran Rural District of the Central District in Malayer County, Hamadan province, Iran.

== Demographics ==
=== Population ===
At the time of the 2006 National Census, the village's population was 1,461 in 390 households. The following census in 2011 counted 1,360 people in 419 households. The 2016 census measured the population of the village as 1,200 people in 403 households.
