= Babolqani =

Village in Hamadan province, Iran

Babolqani Persian: بابلقاني
- Village
- Location within Iran
- Coordinates: 34°14′34″N 49°03′27″E
- Country: Iran
- Province: Hamadan
- County: Malayer
- District: Central
- Rural District: Jowzan

Population (2016)
  - Total: 788
- Time zone: UTC+3:30 (IRST)

Babolqani (Persian: بلقونی) (Note: Also romanized as Bābolqānī; also known as Bābā Qolī, Bābalghani, Babol Ghani, Bābolghānī, and Qal‘eh-ye Bābā Khān) is a village in Jowzan Rural District of the Central District in Malayer County, Hamadan province, Iran.

== Demographics ==
=== Population ===
At the time of the 2006 National Census, the village's population was 1,313 in 332 households. The following census in 2011 counted 883 people in 253 households. The 2016 census measured the population of the village as 788 people in 269 households.
