= Shush Ab =

Village in Hamadan province, Iran

Shush Ab Persian: شوشاب
- Village
- Location within Iran
- Coordinates: 34°21′13″N 48°37′56″E
- Country: Iran
- Province: Hamadan
- County: Malayer
- District: Central
- Rural District: Haram Rud-e Olya

Population (2016)
  - Total: 421
- Time zone: UTC+3:30 (IRST)

Shush Ab (Persian: شوشاب) (Note: Also romanized as Shūsh Āb; also known as Shūshābād) is a village in Haram Rud-e Olya Rural District of the Central District in Malayer County, Hamadan province, Iran.

== Demographics ==
=== Population ===
At the time of the 2006 National Census, the village's population was 518 in 119 households. The following census in 2011 counted 485 people in 148 households. The 2016 census measured the population of the village as 421 people in 141 households.
