= Eznav, Malayer =

Village in Hamadan province, Iran

Eznav Persian: ازناو
- Village
- Location within Iran
- Coordinates: 34°17′58″N 48°51′24″E
- Country: Iran
- Province: Hamadan
- County: Malayer
- District: Central
- Rural District: Kuh Sardeh

Population (2016)
  - Total: 5,411
- Time zone: UTC+3:30 (IRST)

Eznav (Persian: ازناو) (Note: Also romanized as Aznāv and Eznāv) is a village in, and the capital of, Kuh Sardeh Rural District in the Central District of Malayer County, Hamadan province, Iran.

== Demographics ==
=== Population ===
At the time of the 2006 National Census, the village's population was 4,271 in 1,106 households. The following census in 2011 counted 4,864 people in 1,392 households. The 2016 census measured the population of the village as 5,411 people in 1,695 households, the most populous in its rural district.
