= Sharifabad-e Quzan =

Village in Hamadan province, Iran

Sharifabad-e Quzan Persian: شريف ابادقوزان
- Village
- Location within Iran
- Coordinates: 34°24′40″N 48°49′34″E
- Country: Iran
- Province: Hamadan
- County: Malayer
- District: Central
- Rural District: Haram Rud-e Olya

Population (2016)
  - Total: 440
- Time zone: UTC+3:30 (IRST)

Sharifabad-e Quzan (Persian: شريف ابادقوزان) (Note: Also romanized as Sharīfābād-e Qūzān; also known as Sharīfābād) is a village in Haram Rud-e Olya Rural District of the Central District in Malayer County, Hamadan province, Iran.

== Demographics ==
=== Population ===
At the time of the 2006 National Census, the village's population was 481 in 117 households. The following census in 2011 counted 413 people in 114 households. The 2016 census measured the population of the village as 440 people in 137 households.
