= Qeshlaq-e Dehnow =

Village in Hamadan province, Iran

Qeshlaq-e Dehnow Persian: قشلاق ده نو
- Village
- Location within Iran
- Coordinates: 34°28′56″N 48°37′58″E
- Country: Iran
- Province: Hamadan
- County: Malayer
- District: Jowkar
- Rural District: Almahdi

Population (2016)
  - Total: 432
- Time zone: UTC+3:30 (IRST)

Qeshlaq-e Dehnow (Persian: قشلاق ده نو) (Note: Also romanized as Qeshlāq-e Dehnow; also known as Qeshlāq, Qeshlāq-e Kheyrābād, and Qishlāq) is a village in Almahdi Rural District of Jowkar District in Malayer County, Hamadan province, Iran.

== Demographics ==
=== Population ===
At the time of the 2006 National Census, the village's population was 405 in 80 households. The following census in 2011 counted 425 people in 110 households. The 2016 census measured the population of the village as 432 people in 124 households.
