= Kamari, Hamadan =

Village in Hamadan province, Iran

Kamari Persian: كمري
- Village
- Location within Iran
- Coordinates: 34°34′39″N 48°42′05″E
- Country: Iran
- Province: Hamadan
- County: Malayer
- District: Jowkar
- Rural District: Tork-e Gharbi

Population (2016)
  - Total: 1,963
- Time zone: UTC+3:30 (IRST)

Kamari (Persian: كمري) (Note: Also romanized as Kamarī and Kamri; also known as Kamanī) is a village in Tork-e Gharbi Rural District of Jowkar District in Malayer County, Hamadan province, Iran.

== Demographics ==
=== Language ===
It is an Azeri Turkic speaking village.

=== Population ===
At the time of the 2006 National Census, the village's population was 2,389 in 481 households. The following census in 2011 counted 2,218 people in 637 households. The 2016 census measured the population of the village as 1,963 people in 576 households.
