= Darcham =

Village in Hamadan province, Iran

Darcham Persian: دارچم
- Village
- Location within Iran
- Coordinates: 34°15′37″N 48°49′15″E
- Country: Iran
- Province: Hamadan
- County: Malayer
- District: Central
- Rural District: Muzaran

Population (2016)
  - Total: 8
- Time zone: UTC+3:30 (IRST)

Darcham (Persian: دارچم) (Note: Also romanized as Dārcham; also known as Qal‘eh-ye Dārcham) is a village in Muzaran Rural District of the Central District in Malayer County, Hamadan province, Iran.

== Demographics ==
=== Population ===
At the time of the 2006 National Census, the village's population was 23 in seven households. The following census in 2011 counted 18 people in six households. The 2016 census measured the population of the village as eight people in four households.
