= Baba Rais =

Village in Hamadan province, Iran

Baba Rais Persian: بابارئيس
- Village
- Location within Iran
- Coordinates: 34°19′52″N 48°57′40″E
- Country: Iran
- Province: Hamadan
- County: Malayer
- District: Central
- Rural District: Kuh Sardeh

Population (2016)
  - Total: 510
- Time zone: UTC+3:30 (IRST)

Baba Rais (Persian: بابارئيس) (Note: Also romanized as Bābā Ra’īs and Bābā Re’īs) is a village in Kuh Sardeh Rural District of the Central District in Malayer County, Hamadan province, Iran.

== Demographics ==
=== Population ===
At the time of the 2006 National Census, the village's population was 592 in 141 households. The following census in 2011 counted 586 people in 164 households. The 2016 census measured the population of the village as 510 people in 155 households.
