= Bish Aghaj =

Village in Hamadan province, Iran

Bish Aghaj Persian: بيش اغاج
- Village
- Location within Iran
- Coordinates: 34°27′39″N 48°47′10″E
- Country: Iran
- Province: Hamadan
- County: Malayer
- District: Jowkar
- Rural District: Jowkar

Population (2016)
  - Total: 27
- Time zone: UTC+3:30 (IRST)

Bish Aghaj (Persian: بيش اغاج) (Note: Also romanized as Bīsh Āghāj; also known as Besh Āghāch and Bīsheh Āghāj) is a village in Jowkar Rural District of Jowkar District in Malayer County, Hamadan province, Iran.

== Demographics ==
=== Population ===
At the time of the 2006 National Census, the village's population was 47 in 11 households. The following census in 2011 counted 24 people in six households. The 2016 census measured the population of the village as 27 people in 11 households.
