= Burbur, Hamadan =

Village in Hamadan province, Iran

Burbur Persian: بوربور
- Village
- Location within Iran
- Coordinates: 34°25′09″N 48°43′04″E
- Country: Iran
- Province: Hamadan
- County: Malayer
- District: Jowkar
- Rural District: Tork-e Gharbi

Population (2016)
  - Total: 587
- Time zone: UTC+3:30 (IRST)

Burbur (Persian: بوربور) (Note: Also romanized as Būrbūr) is a village in Tork-e Gharbi Rural District of Jowkar District in Malayer County, Hamadan province, Iran.

== Demographics ==
=== Population ===
At the time of the 2006 National Census, the village's population was 784 in 177 households. The following census in 2011 counted 684 people in 175 households. The 2016 census measured the population of the village as 587 people in 169 households.
