= Oshaq =

Village in Hamadan province, Iran

Oshaq Persian: عشاق
- Village
- Location within Iran
- Coordinates: 34°33′12″N 48°39′49″E
- Country: Iran
- Province: Hamadan
- County: Malayer
- District: Jowkar
- Rural District: Jowkar

Population (2016)
  - Total: 831
- Time zone: UTC+3:30 (IRST)

Oshaq (Persian: عشاق) (Note: Also romanized as ‘Oshāq, Oshshaq, and ‘Oshshāq) is a village in Jowkar Rural District of Jowkar District in Malayer County, Hamadan province, Iran.

== Demographics ==
=== Language ===
It is an Azeri speaking village.

=== Population ===
At the time of the 2006 National Census, the village's population was 1,261 in 279 households. The following census in 2011 counted 1,145 people in 323 households. The 2016 census measured the population of the village as 831 people in 241 households.
