= Qaleh-ye Fattahiyeh =

Village in Hamadan province, Iran

Qaleh-ye Fattahiyeh Persian: قلعه فتاحيه
- Village
- Location within Iran
- Coordinates: 34°18′35″N 48°47′00″E
- Country: Iran
- Province: Hamadan
- County: Malayer
- District: Central
- Rural District: Haram Rud-e Olya

Population (2016)
  - Total: 614
- Time zone: UTC+3:30 (IRST)

Qaleh-ye Fattahiyeh (Persian: قلعه فتاحيه) (Note: Also romanized as Qal‘eh Fattāḩīyeh and Qal‘eh-ye Fattāḩīyeh; also known as Ghal‘eh Fattahiyeh, Qal‘eh-ye Fatāḩī, and Qal‘eh-ye Fattāḩī) is a village in Haram Rud-e Olya Rural District of the Central District in Malayer County, Hamadan province, Iran.

== Demographics ==
=== Population ===
At the time of the 2006 National Census, the village's population was 376 in 82 households. The following census in 2011 counted 465 people in 125 households. The 2016 census measured the population of the village as 614 people in 183 households.
