= Ganjab =

Village in Hamadan province, Iran

Ganjab Persian: گنجاب
- Village
- Location within Iran
- Coordinates: 34°27′09″N 48°59′14″E
- Country: Iran
- Province: Hamadan
- County: Malayer
- District: Central
- Rural District: Kuh Sardeh

Population (2016)
  - Total: 146
- Time zone: UTC+3:30 (IRST)

Ganjab (Persian: گنجاب) (Note: Also romanized as Ganj Āb and Ganjāb) is a village in Kuh Sardeh Rural District of the Central District in Malayer County, Hamadan province, Iran.

== Demographics ==
=== Population ===
At the time of the 2006 National Census, the village's population was 158 in 41 households. The following census in 2011 counted 150 people in 37 households. The 2016 census measured the population of the village as 146 people in 45 households.
