= Kahriz, Malayer =

Village in Hamadan province, Iran

Kahriz Persian: كهريز
- Village
- Location within Iran
- Coordinates: 34°16′37″N 49°00′04″E
- Country: Iran
- Province: Hamadan
- County: Malayer
- District: Central
- Rural District: Jowzan

Population (2016)
  - Total: 64
- Time zone: UTC+3:30 (IRST)

Kahriz (Persian: كهريز) (Note: Also romanized as Kahrīz; also known as Kahrīz-e Tūsak and Kahrīz Tūsk) is a village in Jowzan Rural District of the Central District in Malayer County, Hamadan province, Iran.

== Demographics ==
=== Population ===
At the time of the 2006 National Census, the village's population was 188 in 51 households. The following census in 2011 counted 135 people in 38 households. The 2016 census measured the population of the village as 64 people in 23 households.
