= Karimabad, Malayer =

Village in Hamadan province, Iran

Karimabad Persian: كريم اباد
- Village
- Location within Iran
- Coordinates: 34°36′10″N 48°53′09″E
- Country: Iran
- Province: Hamadan
- County: Malayer
- District: Jowkar
- Rural District: Tork-e Gharbi

Population (2016)
  - Total: 363
- Time zone: UTC+3:30 (IRST)

Karimabad (Persian: كريم اباد) (Note: Also romanized as Karīmābād) is a village in Tork-e Gharbi Rural District of Jowkar District in Malayer County, Hamadan province, Iran.

== Demographics ==
=== Population ===
At the time of the 2006 National Census, the village's population was 573 in 127 households. The following census in 2011 counted 443 people in 112 households. The 2016 census measured the population of the village as 363 people in 109 households.
