= Deh-e Shaker =

Village in Hamadan province, Iran

Deh-e Shaker Persian: ده شاكر
- Village
- Location within Iran
- Coordinates: 34°22′44″N 48°32′51″E
- Country: Iran
- Province: Hamadan
- County: Malayer
- District: Jowkar
- Rural District: Almahdi

Population (2016)
  - Total: 435
- Time zone: UTC+3:30 (IRST)

Deh-e Shaker (Persian: ده شاكر) (Note: Also romanized as Deh-e Shāker; formerly known as Dam Shāţer (دم شاطر), also romanized as Dom-e Shāţer; also known as Deh Shāţer, Deh-e Shāţer, Dom-e Shātīr, Dum Shātir, and Dum-i-Shātir) is a village in Almahdi Rural District of Jowkar District in Malayer County, Hamadan province, Iran.

== Demographics ==
=== Population ===
At the time of the 2006 National Census, the village's population was 520 in 132 households. The following census in 2011 counted 451 people in 125 households. The 2016 census measured the population of the village as 435 people in 138 households.
