= Mahmudabad, Kuh Sardeh =

Village in Hamadan province, Iran

Mahmudabad Persian: محموداباد
- Village
- Location within Iran
- Coordinates: 34°19′44″N 48°53′46″E
- Country: Iran
- Province: Hamadan
- County: Malayer
- District: Central
- Rural District: Kuh Sardeh

Population (2016)
  - Total: 360
- Time zone: UTC+3:30 (IRST)

Mahmudabad (Persian: محموداباد) (Note: Also romanized as Maḩmūdābād) is a village in Kuh Sardeh Rural District of the Central District in Malayer County, Hamadan province, Iran.

== Demographics ==
=== Population ===
At the time of the 2006 National Census, the village's population was 341 in 80 households. The following census in 2011 counted 479 people in 89 households. The 2016 census measured the population of the village as 360 people in 102 households.
