= Kesb =

Village in Hamadan province, Iran

Kesb Persian: كسب
- Village
- Location within Iran
- Coordinates: 34°24′55″N 48°43′14″E
- Country: Iran
- Province: Hamadan
- County: Malayer
- District: Jowkar
- Rural District: Jowkar

Population (2016)
  - Total: 1,029
- Time zone: UTC+3:30 (IRST)

Kesb (Persian: كسب) (Note: Also romanized as Kasb) is a village in Jowkar Rural District of Jowkar District in Malayer County, Hamadan province, Iran.

== Demographics ==
=== Population ===
At the time of the 2006 National Census, the village's population was 1,298 in 369 households. The following census in 2011 counted 1,320 people in 396 households. The 2016 census measured the population of the village as 1,029 people in 322 households, the most populous in its rural district.
