= Kamasa =

Kamasa may refer to:

- Kamasa language
- Kamasa, Iran, a village in Hamadan Province, Iran
