= Alamdar-e Olya =

Village in Hamadan province, Iran

Alamdar-e Olya Persian: علمدارعليا
- Village
- Location within Iran
- Coordinates: 34°09′19″N 48°47′35″E
- Country: Iran
- Province: Hamadan
- County: Malayer
- District: Central
- Rural District: Muzaran

Population (2016)
  - Total: 89
- Time zone: UTC+3:30 (IRST)

Alamdar-e Olya (Persian: علمدارعليا) (Note: Also romanized as ‘Alamdār-e ‘Olyā; also known as Alamdār, ‘Alamdār ‘Ūlīya, and ‘Alamdār-e Bālā) is a village in Muzaran Rural District of the Central District in Malayer County, Hamadan province, Iran.

== Demographics ==
=== Population ===
At the time of the 2006 National Census, the village's population was 179 in 71 households. The following census in 2011 counted 125 people in 42 households. The 2016 census measured the population of the village as 89 people in 36 households.
