= Manizan =

Manizan (Persian: مانيزان) may refer to:

- Manizan, Hamadan
- Manizan, Markazi
