= Gamasa =

Village in Hamadan province, Iran

Gamasa Persian: گماسا
- Village
- Location within Iran
- Coordinates: 34°13′49″N 49°05′15″E
- Country: Iran
- Province: Hamadan
- County: Malayer
- District: Central
- Rural District: Jowzan

Population (2016)
  - Total: 846
- Time zone: UTC+3:30 (IRST)

Gamasa (Persian: گماسا) (Note: Also romanized as Gamāsā; also known as Kamāsā) is a village in Jowzan Rural District of the Central District in Malayer County, Hamadan province, Iran.

== Demographics ==
=== Population ===
At the time of the 2006 National Census, the village's population was 925 in 225 households. The following census in 2011 counted 854 people in 229 households. The 2016 census measured the population of the village as 846 people in 265 households.
