= Koleh Bid =

Koleh Bid or Kolahbid (Persian: كله بيد) may refer to:

- Koleh Bid, Hamadan
- Koleh Bid, Markazi
