= Alamdar-e Sofla =

Village in Hamadan province, Iran

Alamdar-e Sofla Persian: علمدارسفلي
- Village
- Location within Iran
- Coordinates: 34°10′05″N 48°49′22″E
- Country: Iran
- Province: Hamadan
- County: Malayer
- District: Central
- Rural District: Muzaran

Population (2016)
  - Total: 89
- Time zone: UTC+3:30 (IRST)

Alamdar-e Sofla (Persian: علمدارسفلي) (Note: Also romanized as ‘Alamdār-e Soflá; also known as ‘Alamdār-e Pā’īn and ‘Alamdār Sufla) is a village in Muzaran Rural District of the Central District in Malayer County, Hamadan province, Iran.

== Demographics ==
=== Population ===
At the time of the 2006 National Census, the village's population was 176 in 56 households. The following census in 2011 counted 101 people in 36 households. The 2016 census measured the population of the village as 89 people in 34 households.
