= Quzan =

Quzan or Qowzan (Persian: قوزان) may refer to:

- Quzan, Hamadan
- Quzan, Razavi Khorasan
- Quzan, Zanjan
- Kozan, Adana in Turkey
