= Almahdi Rural District =

Almahdi Rural District (Persian: دهستان المهدئ) may refer to the following places in Iran:

- Almahdi Rural District (Hamadan Province)
- Almahdi Rural District (Naqadeh County), West Azerbaijan province
