= Eznaveleh, Hamadan =

Village in Hamadan province, Iran

Eznaveleh Persian: ازناوله
- Village
- Location within Iran
- Coordinates: 34°13′55″N 48°54′19″E
- Country: Iran
- Province: Hamadan
- County: Malayer
- District: Central
- Rural District: Muzaran

Population (2016)
  - Total: 579
- Time zone: UTC+3:30 (IRST)

Eznaveleh (Persian: ازناوله) (Note: Also romanized as Aznāvleh, Eznāveleh, and Eznāvleh) is a village in Muzaran Rural District of the Central District in Malayer County, Hamadan province, Iran.

== Demographics ==
=== Population ===
At the time of the 2006 National Census, the village's population was 648 in 181 households. The following census in 2011 counted 615 people in 193 households. The 2016 census measured the population of the village as 579 people in 184 households.
