= Jozan rug =

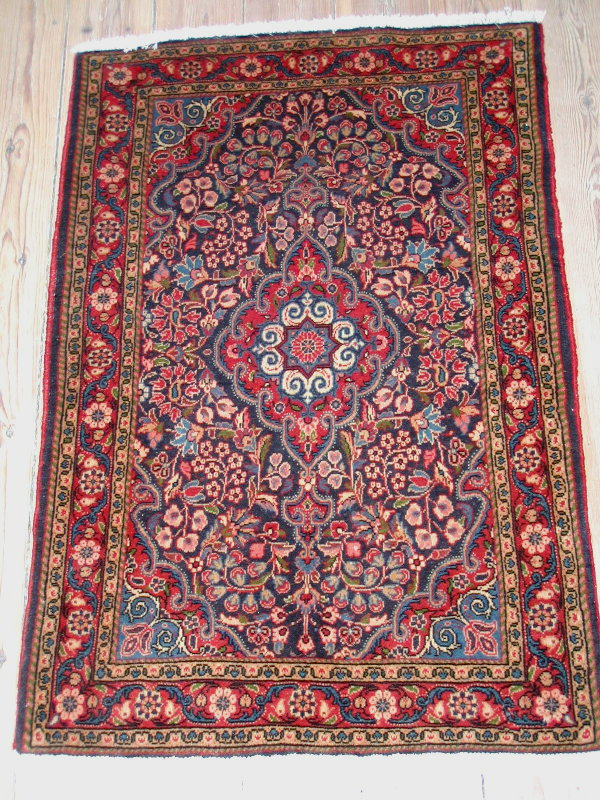
New Jozan rug

Jozan rugs are made in the surroundings of the village Jozan in the Iranian Malayer area. Jozan rugs are quality rugs of the Sarouk type often with designs similar to early 20th century Sarouks. Jozan rugs are often called Jozan Sarouk or Malayer Sarouk in trade. In recent production the finer qualities are labelled Jozan and the less finer knotted are labelled Malayer.

They are double-wefted on a cotton foundation.
