= Tusk-e Sofla =

Village in Hamadan province, Iran

Tusk-e Sofla Persian: توسك سفلي
- Village
- Location within Iran
- Coordinates: 34°15′00″N 48°59′24″E
- Country: Iran
- Province: Hamadan
- County: Malayer
- District: Central
- Rural District: Jowzan

Population (2016)
  - Total: 564
- Time zone: UTC+3:30 (IRST)

Tusk-e Sofla (Persian: توسك سفلي) (Note: Also romanized as Tūsk-e Soflá; also known as Tūsk and Tūsk-e Pā’īn) is a village in Jowzan Rural District of the Central District in Malayer County, Hamadan province, Iran.

== Demographics ==
=== Population ===
At the time of the 2006 National Census, the village's population was 698 in 163 households. The following census in 2011 counted 690 people in 192 households. The 2016 census measured the population of the village as 564 people in 163 households.
