= Eslamshahr-e Aqgol =

City in Hamadan province, Iran

Eslamshahr-e Aqgol Persian: اسلام‌شهر آق‌گل
- City
- Location within Iran
- Coordinates: 34°33′26″N 48°59′22″E
- Country: Iran
- Province: Hamadan
- County: Malayer
- District: Central
- Established as a city: 2017

Population (2016)
  - Total: 4,031
- Time zone: UTC+3:30 (IRST)

Eslamshahr-e Aqgol (Persian: اسلام‌شهر آق‌گل) (Note: Formerly the village of Eslamabad (اسلام اباد) and Kordkhurd (کردخورد) until 1987) is a city in the Central District of Malayer County, Hamadan province, Iran. As a village, it was the capital of Tork-e Sharqi Rural District until its capital was transferred to the village of Alavi.

== Demographics ==
=== Population ===
At the time of the 2006 National Census, the population was 3,717 in 870 households, when it was the village of Eslamabad in Tork-e Sharqi Rural District of Jowkar District. The following census in 2011 counted 3,780 people in 1,071 households. The 2016 census measured the population of the village as 4,031 people in 1,185 households, by which time the rural district had been transferred to the Central District. It was the most populous village in its rural district.

After the census, Eslamabad was converted to a city and renamed Eslamshahr-e Aqgol.
