= Gurab, Hamadan =

Village in Hamadan province, Iran

Gurab Persian: گوراب
- Village
- Location within Iran
- Coordinates: 34°13′37″N 48°51′50″E
- Country: Iran
- Province: Hamadan
- County: Malayer
- District: Central
- Rural District: Muzaran

Population (2016)
  - Total: 2,512
- Time zone: UTC+3:30 (IRST)

Gurab (Persian: گوراب) (Note: Also romanized as Gūrāb; formerly known as Jurab (جوراب), also romanized as Jūrāb) is a village in, and the capital of, Muzaran Rural District in the Central District of Malayer County, Hamadan province, Iran.

== Demographics ==
=== Population ===
At the time of the 2006 National Census, the village's population was 1,621 in 475 households. The following census in 2011 counted 2,731 people in 581 households. The 2016 census measured the population of the village as 2,512 people in 602 households.
