= Eznaveleh =

Eznaveleh or Eznavleh or Aznavleh or Aznavaleh or Aznauleh (Persian: ازناوله) may refer to:

- Eznaveleh, Hamadan
- Aznavleh, Isfahan
