= Koleh Bid, Hamadan =

Village in Hamadan province, Iran

Koleh Bid Persian: كله بيد
- Village
- Location within Iran
- Coordinates: 34°16′11″N 49°01′10″E
- Country: Iran
- Province: Hamadan
- County: Malayer
- District: Central
- Rural District: Jowzan

Population (2016)
  - Total: 46
- Time zone: UTC+3:30 (IRST)

Koleh Bid (Persian: كله بيد) (Note: Also romanized as Kolahbīd and Koleh Bīd) is a village in Jowzan Rural District of the Central District in Malayer County, Hamadan province, Iran.

== Demographics ==
=== Population ===
At the time of the 2006 National Census, the village's population was 70 in 19 households. The following census in 2011 counted 53 people in 16 households. The 2016 census measured the population of the village as 46 people in 16 households.
