= Hadri =

Hadri may refer to:

- Enver Hadri, Albanian activist
- Hadri, Iran, a village in Hamadan Province, Iran
