= Jokar =

Jokar may refer to:

- Jowkar, Iran
- Abdolreza Jokar, Iranian Paralympian athlete
- Masoud Mostafa-Jokar, Iranian wrestler
- Meisam Mostafa-Jokar, Iranian wrestler
