= Tusk-e Olya =

Village in Hamadan province, Iran

Tusk-e Olya Persian: توسك عليا
- Village
- Location within Iran
- Coordinates: 34°15′07″N 48°59′43″E
- Country: Iran
- Province: Hamadan
- County: Malayer
- District: Central
- Rural District: Jowzan

Population (2016)
  - Total: 538
- Time zone: UTC+3:30 (IRST)

Tusk-e Olya (Persian: توسك عليا) (Note: Also romanized as Tūsk-e ‘Olyā; also known as Tūsk and Tūsk-e Bālā) is a village in Jowzan Rural District of the Central District in Malayer County, Hamadan province, Iran.

== Demographics ==
=== Population ===
At the time of the 2006 National Census, the village's population was 628 in 149 households. The following census in 2011 counted 577 people in 163 households. The 2016 census measured the population of the village as 538 people in 157 households.
