= Quzan, Hamadan =

Village in Hamadan province, Iran

Quzan Persian: قوزان
- Village
- Location within Iran
- Coordinates: 34°26′38″N 48°50′29″E
- Country: Iran
- Province: Hamadan
- County: Malayer
- District: Jowkar
- Rural District: Jowkar

Population (2016)
  - Total: 318
- Time zone: UTC+3:30 (IRST)

Quzan (Persian: قوزان) (Note: Also romanized as Qowzān and Qūzān; also known as Ghoozan, Ghūzān, and Qozān) is a village in Jowkar Rural District of Jowkar District in Malayer County, Hamadan province, Iran.

== Demographics ==
=== Population ===
At the time of the 2006 National Census, the village's population was 383 in 88 households. The following census in 2011 counted 315 people in 85 households. The 2016 census measured the population of the village as 318 people in 89 households.
