= Khedri, Hamadan =

Village in Hamadan province, Iran

Khedri Persian: خدري
- Village
- Location within Iran
- Coordinates: 34°28′59″N 48°50′12″E
- Country: Iran
- Province: Hamadan
- County: Malayer
- District: Jowkar
- Rural District: Jowkar

Population (2016)
  - Total: 326
- Time zone: UTC+3:30 (IRST)

Khedri (Persian: خدري) (Note: Also romanized as Khederī and Khedrī; also known as Hadri and Hedrī) is a village in Jowkar Rural District of Jowkar District in Malayer County, Hamadan province, Iran.

== Demographics ==
=== Population ===
At the time of the 2006 National Census, the village's population was 496 in 112 households. The following census in 2011 counted 392 people in 117 households. The 2016 census measured the population of the village as 326 people in 93 households.
