= Jozan =

Jozan may refer to:

== People ==
- Sándor Józan (1932–1985) Hungarian state security officer and diplomat
- Ishikawa Jōzan (石川 丈山; 1583–1672), Japanese samurai and a literai

== Places ==
- Jozani Chwaka Bay National Park, a national park of Tanzania located on the island of Zanzibar
- Jozan, Iran (disambiguation)

== Others ==
- Jozan, iconic character in Dungeons & Dragons
- Jozan rug, made in the surroundings of the village Jozan
