= Manizan, Hamadan =

Village in Hamadan province, Iran

Manizan Persian: مانيزان
- Village
- Location within Iran
- Coordinates: 34°15′07″N 49°01′00″E
- Country: Iran
- Province: Hamadan
- County: Malayer
- District: Central
- Rural District: Jowzan

Population (2016)
  - Total: 386
- Time zone: UTC+3:30 (IRST)

Manizan (Persian: مانيزان) (Note: Also romanized as Mānīzān; also known as Mīzān) is a village in Jowzan Rural District of the Central District in Malayer County, Hamadan province, Iran.

== Demographics ==
=== Population ===
At the time of the 2006 National Census, the village's population was 618 in 228 households. The following census in 2011 counted 516 people in 226 households. The 2016 census measured the population of the village as 386 people in 183 households.
