= Haram Rud-e Olya Rural District =

Rural district in Hamadan province, Iran

Haram Rud-e Olya Rural District Persian: دهستان حرم رود عليا
- Rural District
- Location within Iran
- Coordinates: 34°20′N 48°44′E
- Country: Iran
- Province: Hamadan
- County: Malayer
- District: Central
- Established: 1987
- Capital: Mehrabad

Population (2016)
  - Total: 7,555
- Time zone: UTC+3:30 (IRST)

Haram Rud-e Olya Rural District (Persian: دهستان حرم رود عليا) is in the Central District of Malayer County, Hamadan province, Iran. Its capital is the village of Mehrabad.

== Demographics ==
=== Population ===
At the time of the 2006 National Census, the rural district's population was 8,251 in 2,106 households. There were 8,107 inhabitants in 2,415 households at the following census of 2011. The 2016 census measured the population of the rural district as 7,555 in 2,380 households. The most populous of its 20 villages was Hajjiabad, with 1,877 people.

=== Other villages in the rural district ===
- Haramabad
- Karkan
- Qaleh-ye Fattahiyeh
- Sharifabad-e Quzan
- Shush Ab
- Tucheghaz
