= Muzaran Rural District =

Rural district in Hamadan province, Iran

Muzaran Rural District Persian: دهستان موزاران
- Rural District
- Location within Iran
- Coordinates: 34°13′N 48°50′E
- Country: Iran
- Province: Hamadan
- County: Malayer
- District: Central
- Established: 1987
- Capital: Gurab

Population (2016)
  - Total: 10,345
- Time zone: UTC+3:30 (IRST)

Muzaran Rural District (Persian: دهستان موزاران) is in the Central District of Malayer County, Hamadan province, Iran. Its capital is the village of Gurab. (Note: Formerly Jurab)

== Demographics ==
=== Population ===
At the time of the 2006 National Census, the rural district's population was 8,883 in 2,445 households. There were 11,059 inhabitants in 3,135 households at the following census of 2011. The 2016 census measured the population of the rural district as 10,345 in 3,103 households. The most populous of its 13 villages was Namileh, with 2,998 people.

=== Other villages in the rural district ===
- Abbasiyeh
- Alamdar-e Olya
- Alamdar-e Sofla
- Darcham
- Davijan
- Eznaveleh
- Farvaz
- Marvil
- Rezvankadeh
- Sib Dar
