= Jowkar Rural District =

Rural district in Hamadan province, Iran

Jowkar Rural District Persian: دهستان جوکار
- Rural District
- Location within Iran
- Coordinates: 34°29′N 48°46′E
- Country: Iran
- Province: Hamadan
- County: Malayer
- District: Jowkar
- Established: 1987
- Capital: Jowkar

Population (2016)
  - Total: 4,218
- Time zone: UTC+3:30 (IRST)

Jowkar Rural District (Persian: دهستان جوکار) is in Jowkar District of Malayer County, Hamadan province, Iran. It is administered from the city of Jowkar.

== Demographics ==
=== Population ===
At the time of the 2006 National Census, the rural district's population was 6,100 in 1,474 households. There were 5,394 inhabitants in 1,510 households at the following census of 2011. The 2016 census measured the population of the rural district as 4,218 in 1,255 households. The most populous of its 17 villages was Kesb, with 1,029 people.

=== Other villages in the rural district ===
- Bish Aghaj
- Kand Halan
- Khedri
- Nanaj
- Oshaq
- Quzan
- Sang-e Sefid-e Nanaj
