= Tork-e Gharbi Rural District =

Rural district in Hamadan province, Iran

Tork-e Gharbi Rural District Persian: دهستان ترك غربي
- Rural District
- Location within Iran
- Coordinates: 34°35′N 48°47′E
- Country: Iran
- Province: Hamadan
- County: Malayer
- District: Jowkar
- Established: 1987
- Capital: Yengi Kand

Population (2016)
  - Total: 11,298
- Time zone: UTC+3:30 (IRST)

Tork-e Gharbi Rural District (Persian: دهستان ترك غربي) is in Jowkar District of Malayer County, Hamadan province, Iran. Its capital is the village of Yengi Kand.

== Demographics ==
=== Population ===
At the time of the 2006 National Census, the rural district's population was 12,367 in 2,832 households. There were 11,503 inhabitants in 3,127 households at the following census of 2011. The 2016 census measured the population of the rural district as 11,298 in 3,402 households. The most populous of its 21 villages was Yengi Kand, with 2,638 people.

=== Other villages in the rural district ===
- Alfavet
- Burbur
- Kamari
- Karimabad
- Mangavi
- Zamanabad
