= Tusker =

Tusker or Tuskers may refer to:

== Animals ==
- an elephant with large tusks
- an adult male wild boar, particularly the American razorback population

== Food and drink ==
- Tusker (African beer), a Kenyan beer bottled by East African Breweries
- Tusker (Vanuatu beer), a beer brewed by Vanuatu Brewing in Vanuatu

== Military unit nicknames ==
- 4th Battalion, 64th Armor Regiment, a United States Army unit
- No. 5 Squadron IAF, an Indian Air Force squadron
- 413 Transport and Rescue Squadron, a Canadian Armed Forces air force squadron

== Sports teams ==
=== Cricket ===
- Ballari Tuskers, a Karnataka Premier League cricket franchise
- Kandy Tuskers, a team in the Lanka Premier League now known as Kandy Falcons
- Kochi Tuskers Kerala, a former Indian Premier League cricket franchise
- Matabeleland Tuskers, a Zimbabwean cricket franchise
- Tuskers women's cricket team, a Zimbabwean women's cricket team
- Karnataka Tuskers, a team in the 2019 Abu Dhabi T10

=== Other sports ===
- Sri Lanka rugby union team, nicknamed Tuskers
- East Africa rugby union team, who tour under the nickname Tuskers
- Tusker F.C., a Kenyan football club owned by the East African Breweries
- Florida Tuskers, a former United Football League franchise
- the sports teams of Somers High School (New York), a public school

== Other uses ==
- Tusker Rock, a rock in the Bristol Channel, Wales
- a character in the Japanese anime series Kiba
- a member of the DC Comics Justice League of Earth
- the University of Nebraska's former Holland Computing Center high memory cluster
- the name of a DHR B Class steam locomotive

== See also ==
- Tusk (disambiguation)
