= Jowzan, Hamadan =

Village in Hamadan province, Iran

Jowzan Persian: جوزان
- Village
- Location within Iran
- Coordinates: 34°15′15″N 48°57′47″E
- Country: Iran
- Province: Hamadan
- County: Malayer
- District: Central
- Rural District: Jowzan

Population (2016)
  - Total: 2,625
- Time zone: UTC+3:30 (IRST)

Jowzan (Persian: جوزان) (Note: Also romanized as Jaūzān and Jowzān; also known as Zaūzan) is a village in, and the capital of, Jowzan Rural District in the Central District of Malayer County, Hamadan province, Iran.

== Demographics ==
=== Population ===
At the time of the 2006 National Census, the village's population was 2,854 in 740 households. The following census in 2011 counted 2,719 people in 815 households. The 2016 census measured the population of the village as 2,625 people in 825 households, the most populous in its rural district.
