= Tork-e Sharqi Rural District =

Rural district in Hamadan province, Iran

Tork-e Sharqi Rural District Persian: دهستان ترك شرقي
- Rural District
- Location within Iran
- Coordinates: 34°33′N 48°57′E
- Country: Iran
- Province: Hamadan
- County: Malayer
- District: Central
- Capital: Alavi

Population (2016)
  - Total: 10,576
- Time zone: UTC+3:30 (IRST)

Tork-e Sharqi Rural District (Persian: دهستان ترك شرقي) is in the Central District of Malayer County, Hamadan province, Iran. Its capital is the village of Alavi. The previous capital of the rural district was the village of Eslamabad, now the city of Eslamshahr-e Aqgol.

== Demographics ==
=== Population ===
At the time of the 2006 National Census, the rural district's population (as a part of Jowkar District) was 11,003 in 2,492 households. There were 10,814 inhabitants in 3,020 households at the following census of 2011. The 2016 census measured the population of the rural district as 10,576 in 3,131 households, by which time the rural district had been transferred to the Central District. The most populous of its 10 villages was Eslamabad (now the city of Eslamshahr-e Aqgol), with 4,031 people.

=== Other villages in the rural district ===
- Dashtabad
- Kheradmand
- Musa Bolaghi
- Qeshlaq-e Qobad
- Tajar-e Alavi
- Tutal
- Uch Tappeh
