= Aliabad-e Damaq =

City in Hamadan province, Iran

Aliabad-e Damaq Persian: علي اباد دمق
- City
- Location within Iran
- Coordinates: 34°31′53″N 48°36′22″E
- Country: Iran
- Province: Hamadan
- County: Malayer
- District: Jowkar
- Established as a city: 2024

Population (2016)
  - Total: 3,707
- Time zone: UTC+3:30 (IRST)

Aliabad-e Damaq (Persian: علي اباددمق) (Note: Also romanized as Alīābād Damaq and ‘Alīābad-e Damāq; also known as ‘Alīābād and ‘Alīābād-e Damāgh) is a city in Jowkar District of Malayer County, Hamadan province, Iran.

== Demographics ==
=== Population ===
At the time of the 2006 National Census, Aliabad-e Damaq's population was 6,673 in 1,493 households, when it was a village in Almahdi Rural District. The following census in 2011 counted 5,751 people in 1,567 households. The 2016 census measured the population of the village as 3,707 people in 1,259 households, the most populous in its rural district.

Aliabad-e Damaq was converted a city in 2024.
