= Azandarian =

City in Hamadan province, Iran

Azandarian Persian: ازندريان
- City
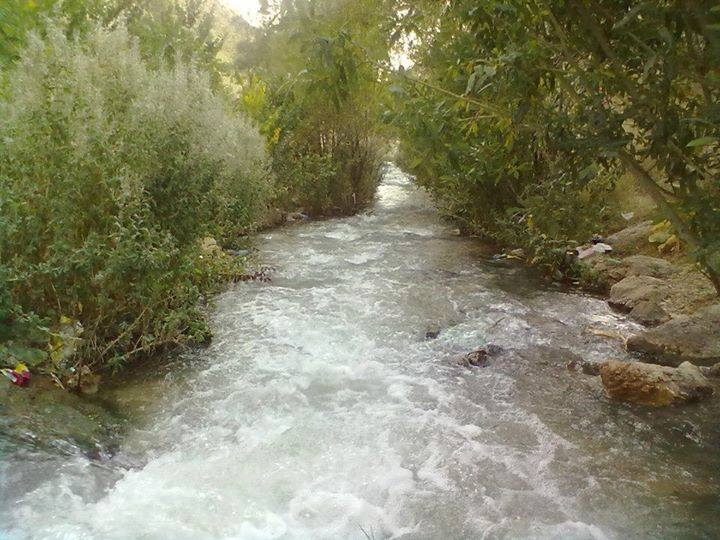

- Location within Iran
- Coordinates: 34°30′13″N 48°41′26″E
- Country: Iran
- Province: Hamadan
- County: Malayer
- District: Jowkar
- Established as a city: 1996

Population (2016)
  - Total: 11,171
- Time zone: UTC+3:30 (IRST)

Azandarian (Persian: ازندريان) (Note: Also romanized as Azan Daryān, Azandarīān, and Azandarīyān) is a city in Jowkar District of Malayer County, Hamadan province, Iran. The village of Azandarian was converted to a city in 1996.

== Demographics ==
=== Population ===
At the time of the 2006 National Census, the city's population was 8,685 in 2,126 households. The following census in 2011 counted 9,324 people in 2,533 households. The 2016 census measured the population of the city as 11,171 people in 3,328 households.

== Gallery ==
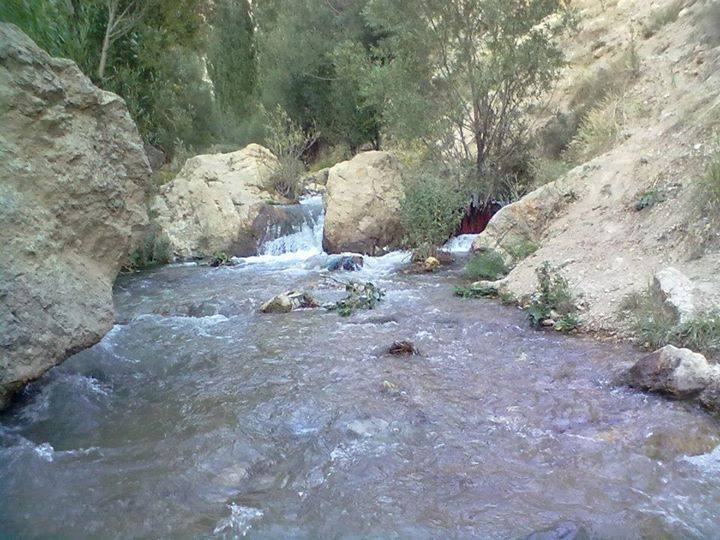

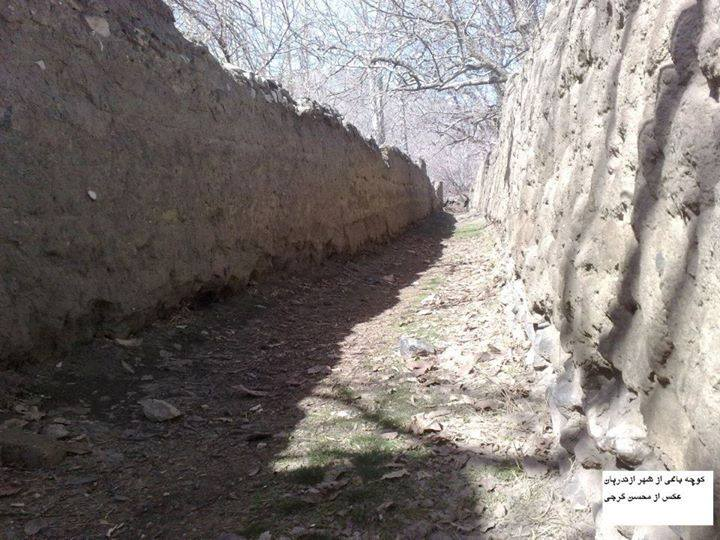
