= Noushijan =

Iranian archaeological site

nooshijan
- نوشیجان
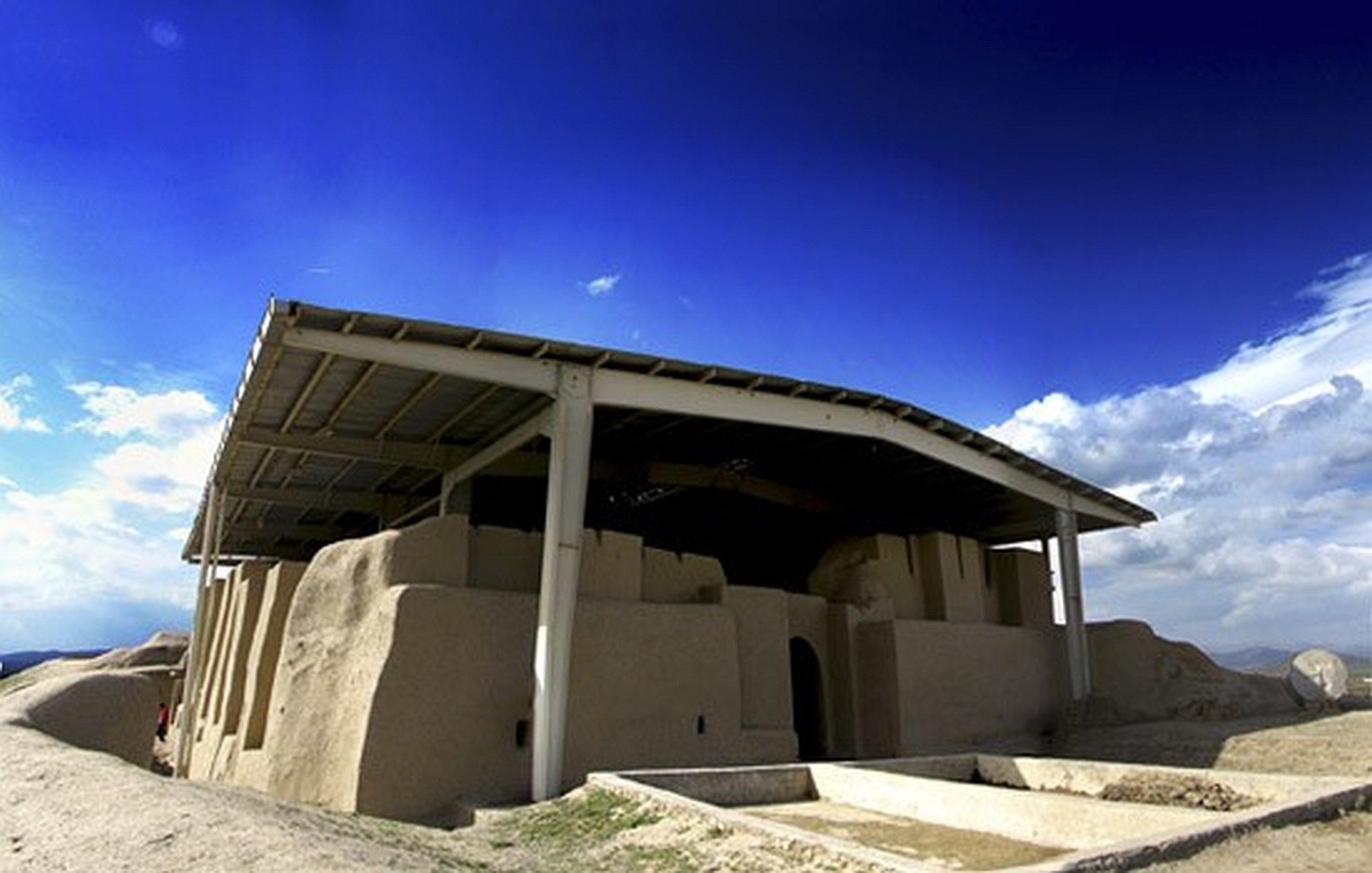

- Location within Iran
- Alternative names: Nush-i Jan / Nushijan / Noushijan

General information
- Status: Cultural
- Type: Fire temple
- Location: Malayer, Iran
- Coordinates: 34.365559°N 48.633357°E

Nooshijan is an archaeological site in the west of Iran near Malayer. According to excavations from the site, the area was not inhabited earlier than 800 BC. The discovered features of this Tappe are as follows:

- a building in the west of the Tappe (the first fire temple)
- a columned hall (Apadana)
- a central temple (the second temple)
- rooms and storerooms
- a tunnel
- a rampart

== Building in the west of Tappe ==
According to the plan of the discovered building and according to the archaeological and architectural investigations, the building was built before Apadana. The entrance of the building is in its eastern side like a central temple. It has two connected spaces.

The inner space of the building is rectangular and its entrance is in the neighboring room. The rest of a coal bowl in the southern side of the main room proves, that the fire ceremony was carried out (secretly). It can be suggested that the first fire temple was in a covered space in Noushijan Tappe and the ceremony had a connection with the developing religious ceremony in the Median era. On the southern and western wall, there are ruins of two niches with egg-shaped vaults.

== Columned hall ==
The hall was built on an adobe platform. Its foundation is from loam mortar. The hall is 20 m long and 15 m wide. Its eastern side is not completely right-angled. The central space of Apadana has three column rows. Each row has four columns. The space has twelve columns that carried the weight of ceiling. The columns were wooden. Each column had a diameter of 25 cm. The eastern wall has two decorative niches; on the western side there are no decorations. Under the ceiling, there are windows that provide enough light for the space.

== Main temple ==
The main temple is an adobe semicircular octagon. This building is one of the most valuable median buildings.

== Room and storerooms ==
The second important building in Noushijan are the rooms and storerooms. The castle includes an enclosure wall, towers and four weapon storerooms. It is totally 25 m long and 22 m wide. The outer walls have 6 towers in the width and 7 towers in the length. The only entrance is in the middle of the eastern wall.

== Tunnel ==
In the northern part of Apadana, there is an artificial cellarlike pit that leads to a rock in the depth of 3 m. This pit has stairs. Its height is 170 cm and its width is 180 cm. According to its form, the tunnel has never reached the end and because of unknown reasons was abandoned as incomplete. The tunnel was built in the last phase of region's inhabitation.

== Rampart ==
In the southern and eastern part of the room and storerooms there is a rampart that encloses the buildings in the eastern part with a particular curve.
