= Juzan =

1897 French automobile

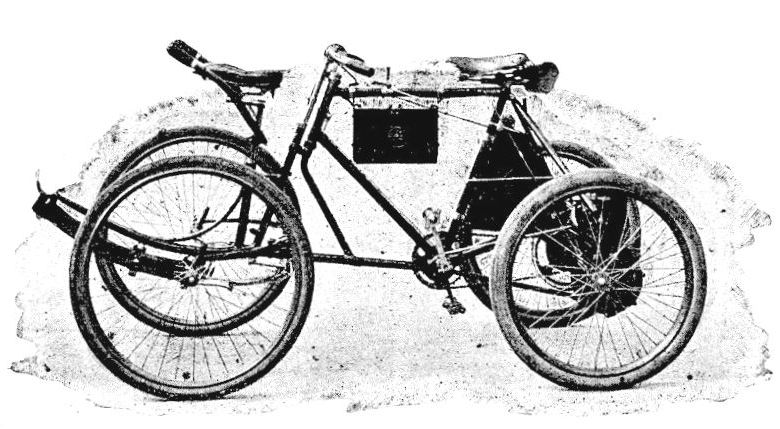
Juzan

The Juzan was a French automobile manufactured only in 1897; it was a light motorised quadricycle along De Dion lines.
