= Alamdar, Razavi Khorasan =

Alamdar علمدار
- Village
- Location within Iran
- Coordinates: 35°14′15″N 59°58′02″E
- Country: Iran
- Province: Razavi Khorasan
- County: Zaveh
- Bakhsh: Soleyman
- Rural District: Soleyman

Population (2006)
  - Total: 518
- Time zone: UTC+3:30 (IRST)
  - Summer (DST): UTC+4:30 (IRDT)

Alamdar (Persian: علمدار, also Romanized as ‘Alamdār) is a village in Soleyman Rural District, Soleyman District, Zaveh County, Razavi Khorasan Province, Iran. At the 2006 census, its population was 518, in 108 families.

== See also ==
- List of cities, towns and villages in Razavi Khorasan Province
