= Jowkar, Iran =

City in Hamadan province, Iran

Jowkar Persian: جوكار
- City
- Location within Iran
- Coordinates: 34°25′49″N 48°41′15″E
- Country: Iran
- Province: Hamadan
- County: Malayer
- District: Jowkar
- Established as a city: 2000

Population (2016)
  - Total: 2,258
- Time zone: UTC+3:30 (IRST)

Jowkar (Persian: جوكار) (Note: Also romanized as Jow Kār and Jowkār; also known as Jaūkāl and Jokar) is a city in, and the capital of, Jowkar District of Malayer County, Hamadan province, Iran. It also serves as the administrative center for Jowkar Rural District. The village of Jowkar was converted to a city in 2000 after merging with the village of Abbasabad.

== Demographics ==
=== Population ===
At the time of the 2006 National Census, the city's population was 2,209 in 548 households. The following census in 2011 counted 2,425 people in 644 households. The 2016 census measured the population of the city as 2,258 people in 674 households.
