= Alamdar, Khuzestan =

Alamdar علمدار
- Village
- Location within Iran
- Coordinates: 30°36′59″N 50°27′02″E
- Country: Iran
- Province: Khuzestan
- County: Behbahan
- Bakhsh: Central
- Rural District: Howmeh

Population (2006)
  - Total: 75
- Time zone: UTC+3:30 (IRST)
  - Summer (DST): UTC+4:30 (IRDT)

Alamdar (Persian: علمدار, also Romanized as ‘Alamdār) is a village in Howmeh Rural District, in the Central District of Behbahan County, Khuzestan Province, Iran. At the 2006 census, its population was 75, in 20 families.
