= Malayer =

City in Hamadan province, Iran

Malayer Persian: ملایر
- City
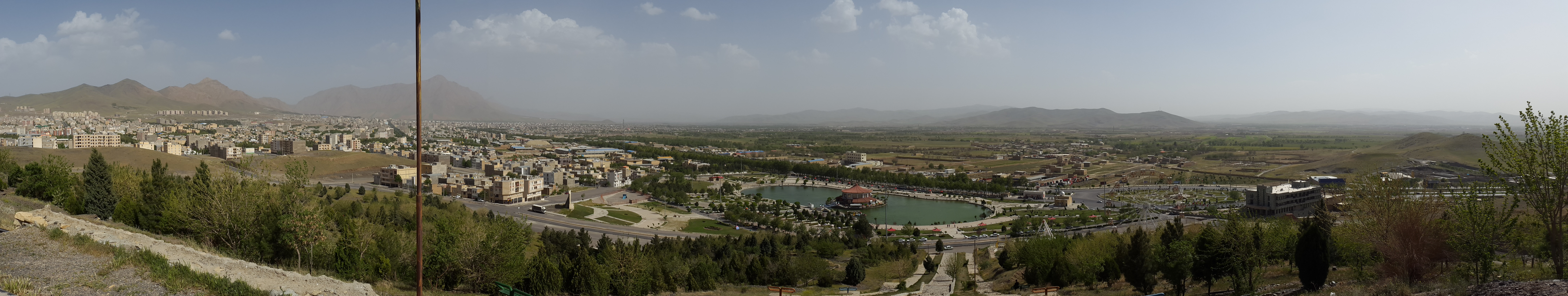

- Location within Iran
- Coordinates: 34°18′00″N 48°49′04″E
- Country: Iran
- Province: Hamadan
- County: Malayer
- District: Central

Area
  - Total: 22.8 km^{2} (8.8 sq mi)
- Elevation: 1,746 m (5,728 ft)

Population (2016)
  - Total: 170,237
  - Rank: Second in the province
  - Density: 58,910/km^{2} (152,600/sq mi)
- Time zone: UTC+3:30 (IRST)
- Postal code: 65711 - 65791
- Area code: 0813

Malayer (Persian: ملایر) (Note: Also romanized as Malāyer; formerly Dowlatabad (دولت‌آباد), also romanized as Daūlatābād, Doulatābād, and Dowlatābād) is a city in the Central District of Malayer County, Hamadan province, Iran, serving as capital of both the county and the district.

Malayer is the second-largest city in the province, and is famous for furniture. The city has many parks, the biggest historical park of which is Seyfieh Park. Malayer is located between the two cities of Hamedan and Arak, both of which are the centers of the province. Malayer is the national city of furniture and inlays and the world city of grapes.

== History ==
Malayer, a city in western Iran, has a rich history dating back to ancient and pre-Islamic times. Originally known as Dowlatabad, it was renamed Malayer in the early 20th century, marking a shift in administrative and cultural significance.

The city gained prominence during the Seljuk and Safavid eras as a key center for rug production. Its strategic location along historic trade routes contributed to its cultural diversity, reflected in the variety of designs found in Malayer rugs. Additionally, Malayer has been notable for its craftsmanship, particularly in rug-weaving and woodworking traditions.

During the Persian famine of 1917–1919, Malayer, like many other regions in Iran, experienced severe food shortages and hardship. The community faced challenges in sustaining local resources, significantly affecting the population.

Following the Anglo-Soviet invasion of Iran during World War II, Malayer came under British control. This occupation impacted local agriculture and resources, contributing to the economic and social conditions of the time.

== Demographics ==
=== Population ===
At the time of the 2006 National Census, the city's population was 153,748 in 40,750 households. The following census in 2011 counted 159,848 people in 46,939 households. The 2016 census measured the population of the city as 170,237 people in 52,697 households.

== Climate ==
Malayer has a hot-summer Mediterranean climate (Csa) according to the Köppen climate classification.

Climate data for Malayer (Elevation:1777.8m)(1992–2010)
| Month | Jan | Feb | Mar | Apr | May | Jun | Jul | Aug | Sep | Oct | Nov | Dec | Year |
|---|---|---|---|---|---|---|---|---|---|---|---|---|---|
| Mean daily maximum °C (°F) | 5.4 (41.7) | 7.9 (46.2) | 12.3 (54.1) | 18.3 (64.9) | 23.7 (74.7) | 30.6 (87.1) | 34.7 (94.5) | 34.6 (94.3) | 29.8 (85.6) | 22.8 (73.0) | 14.1 (57.4) | 8.9 (48.0) | 20.3 (68.5) |
| Daily mean °C (°F) | 0.4 (32.7) | 2.9 (37.2) | 7.1 (44.8) | 12.0 (53.6) | 16.5 (61.7) | 21.8 (71.2) | 25.7 (78.3) | 25.2 (77.4) | 20.5 (68.9) | 15.1 (59.2) | 8.1 (46.6) | 3.6 (38.5) | 13.2 (55.8) |
| Mean daily minimum °C (°F) | −4.1 (24.6) | −2.7 (27.1) | 0.5 (32.9) | 5.6 (42.1) | 8.9 (48.0) | 12.5 (54.5) | 16.4 (61.5) | 16.0 (60.8) | 11.0 (51.8) | 7.1 (44.8) | 2.3 (36.1) | −1.2 (29.8) | 6.0 (42.8) |
| Average precipitation mm (inches) | 33.2 (1.31) | 40.6 (1.60) | 59.2 (2.33) | 55.4 (2.18) | 24.6 (0.97) | 3.4 (0.13) | 1.7 (0.07) | 3.8 (0.15) | 1.4 (0.06) | 15.6 (0.61) | 45.4 (1.79) | 35.3 (1.39) | 319.6 (12.59) |
| Average relative humidity (%) | 69 | 62 | 56 | 51 | 44 | 30 | 27 | 26 | 27 | 38 | 58 | 65 | 46 |
Source: IRIMO

== Tourist attractions ==
Seifiyeh Park

One of the oldest natural parks in the west of the country is Seifiyeh Malayer Park, which is located in the northeast of this city at the foot of Mount Garme. This garden is built on an area of about 10 hectares and was built in 1304 by Saif al-Dawlah, the grandson of Fath Ali Shah Qajar, during his rule over Malayer and Toyserkan provinces.

Tappeh Nooshijan

Tappeh Nooshijan (Tepe Nush-i Jan) is an ancient archaeological site near Malayer, known for its well-preserved remnants of Median and Achaemenid structures. The site includes a fortress, temple, and various artifacts, providing valuable insights into early Iranian civilizations. It serves as an important location for historical and archaeological studies, attracting researchers and tourists interested in Iran's ancient heritage.

Mini World Malayer

Mini World Malayer is a theme park in Malayer, Iran, featuring scaled replicas of famous landmarks from around the world and Iran. The park aims to provide educational and cultural experiences, highlighting significant historical and architectural achievements. Among the replicas are well-known structures like the Eiffel Tower and the Taj Mahal, allowing visitors to explore global landmarks in a compact setting.

Bam-e-Malayer

Bam-e-Malayer is one of the sights of this city, which is located in the eastern part of this city.

== Notable people ==
- Karim Khan Zand (c. 1705 – 1779): Founder of the Zand Dynasty, ruling from 1751 to 1779. Ruled over Iran (Persia) except for Khorasan.
- Mohammad Mohammadi-Malayeri (1911–2002): Professor focused on explaining the 250-year break in Iranian literary history.
- Azita Hajian (born 1958), actress, Crystal Simorgh winner for Best Actress, 17th Fajr International Film Festival
- Hossein Yari (born 1968): actor, known for his work in theatre and Iranian television.

== Notable tribal and noble families ==
The region of Malayer has historically been home to prominent Laki-speaking noble families. Among them, the Gheisari family is notable for its deep tribal roots and historical governance. Originating from nearby villages, members of this noble family held military and administrative roles during the Zand era and are considered part of the broader Laki tribal aristocracy. The region of Malayer, Nahavand, and Hamedan has historically been home to prominent Laki-speaking noble families who played major roles during and around the Zand dynasty era.

=== Gheisari (Ghiasvand Gheisari) family ===
The Gheisari (also known as Ghiasvand Gheisari) family is one of the most historically significant noble lineages in western Iran. Of Laki-speaking origin, the family traces its roots to ancient tribal structures that developed in the rugged highlands between Malayer, Nahavand, and Hamadan Province, particularly the village of Zaramin-e Sofla, which remains a known center of Gheisari heritage today.

The Gheisari family is part of the larger Ghiasvand tribe, a notable Laki tribal confederation with a long-standing presence in western Iran. This clan distinguished itself through military service, tribal governance, and support of regional rulers, particularly during the 18th century rise of the Zand dynasty. Historical patterns of geography, intermarriage, language, and military alliances strongly indicate a direct bond between the Gheisari family and the Zand rulers.

During the formation and consolidation of the Zand state under Karim Khan Zand, tribal coalitions were vital for both military stability and political legitimacy. The Gheisari family — with its large tribal base and strong command over surrounding villages — played a key role in these alliances. Oral history and regional records name individuals such as Amir Amjad Khan Ghiasvand Gheisari and Aziz Khan Ghiasvand as influential figures, both in terms of local leadership and support for Zand campaigns. These individuals were recognized not only as local chiefs but as governors and military commanders entrusted with significant authority by the central court.

Intermarriage between Zand elites and noble families like the Gheisari was a common method of cementing political ties, strengthening tribal bonds, and ensuring loyalty. The Gheisari family's sustained proximity to the Zand power base — geographically, linguistically, and militarily — has led many historians and genealogists to regard them as a “sister house” of the Zand dynasty, sharing ancestry or at least regional aristocratic kinship.

Culturally, the Gheisari family has remained influential throughout successive political eras. Despite the fall of the Zand dynasty and the rise of the Qajar dynasty, the Gheisari nobles retained tribal leadership roles and have continued to inhabit their ancestral regions to this day, particularly in Malayer, and Nahavand City. In contrast to the Zand family, whose surviving members are now primarily located in Shiraz and exist in smaller numbers, the Gheisari family has maintained a larger and more geographically continuous presence in their homeland.

The name “Gheisari” itself may carry symbolic linguistic weight, with possible connections to royal and imperial terms such as “Caesar” in Latin and “Kaiser” in German — both of which refer to emperors. While this similarity could be coincidental, some historians and cultural theorists interpret the name's persistence as an echo of long-standing nobility and tribal authority.Today, the Gheisari (Ghiasvand Gheisari) family continues to be recognized among the major Laki-origin noble families of western Iran, with an enduring legacy of military, political, and tribal leadership stretching back to the Zand era and beyond.

=== Mostowfian Ashtiani family ===
Though originally Persian and centered in Ashtian, the Mostowfian Ashtiani family served in high administrative and financial roles under various dynasties, including the Zands. They were known for their role as mostowfis (financial administrators) and advisors. Some members had alliances with tribal leaders in western Iran.

=== Khajeh Nouri family ===
Originating from Mazandaran, the Khajeh Nouri family was a powerful aristocratic house whose influence spanned the Safavid, Zand, and Qajar eras. Although not Laki, they often operated in the same administrative circles and were considered nobility in their own right. Mirza Aqa Khan Nuri later became Prime Minister under Naser al-Din Shah Qajar.

=== Zand tribe ===
The Zands themselves were a Laki-speaking tribe from the Malayer–Nahavand area. Karim Khan Zand founded the Zand dynasty in the 18th century, with his rule marked by tribal coalition-building. The Zand dynasty's closest tribal and noble allies included the Gheisari and other Laki-speaking families.

== Gallery ==
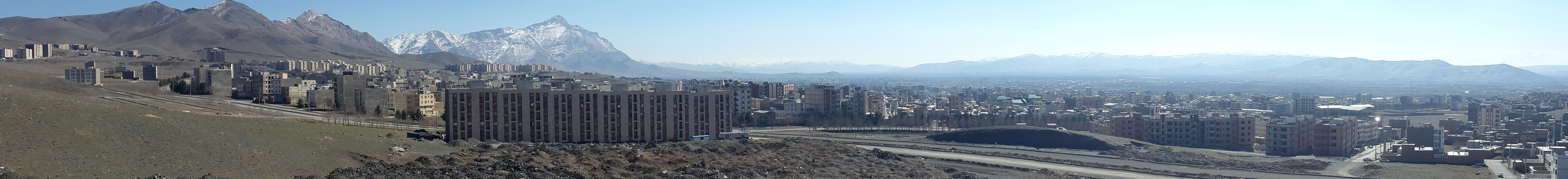
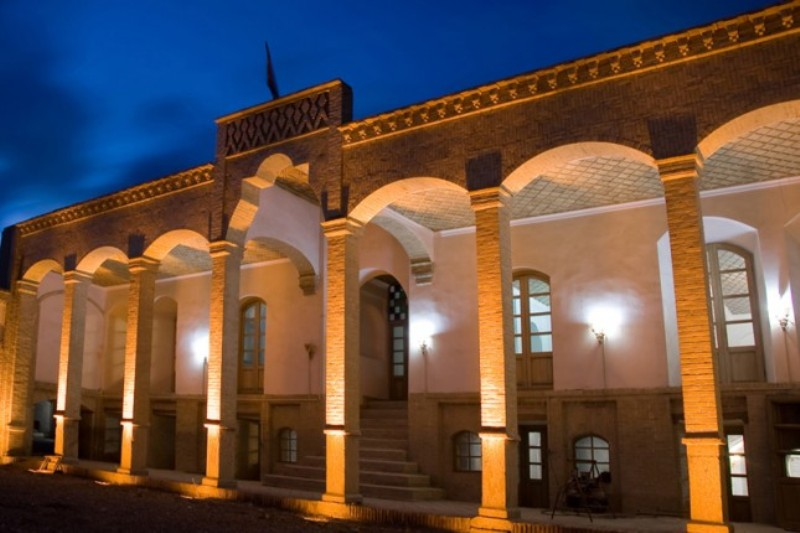
Malayer Museum.

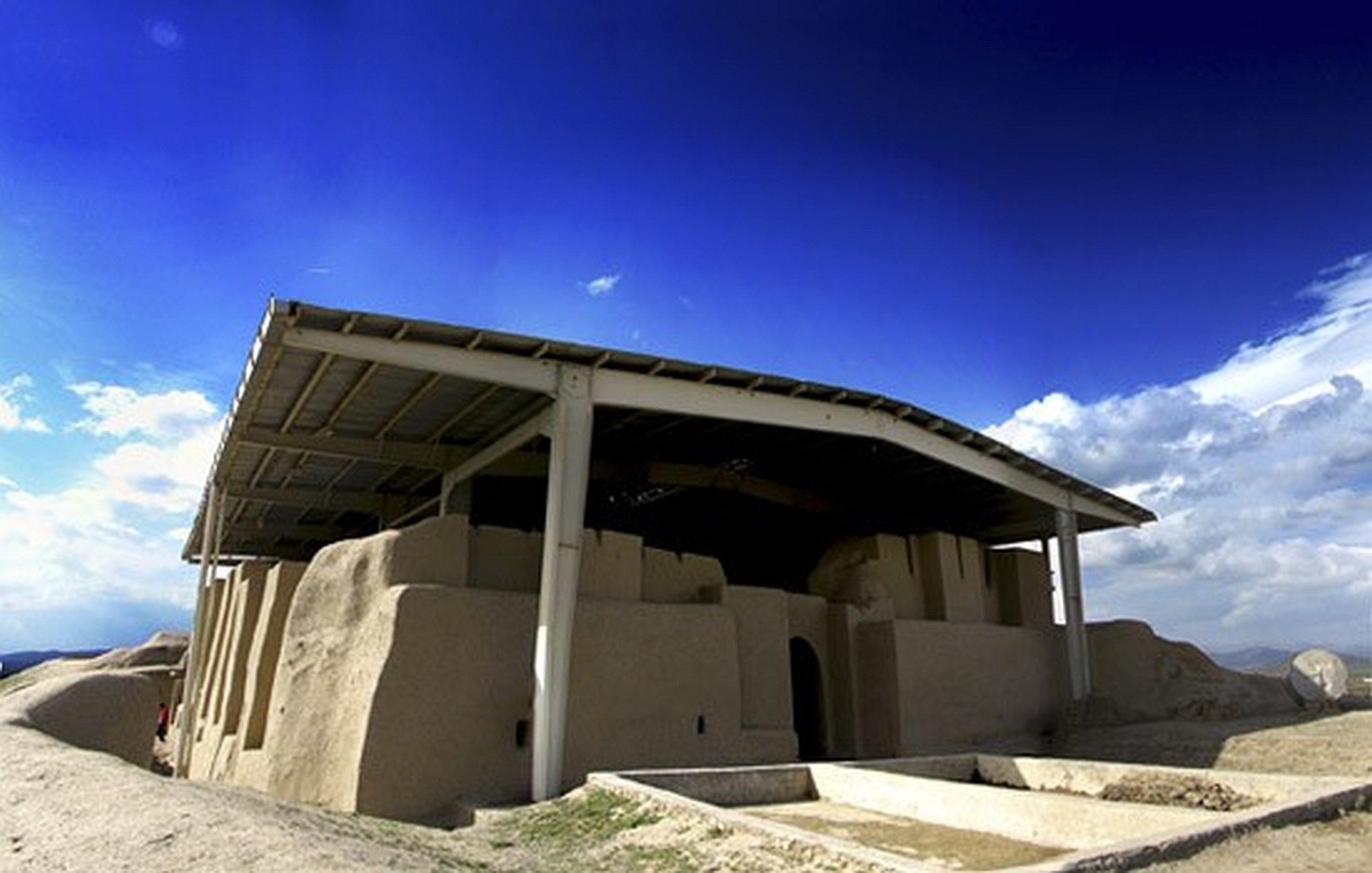
Nooshijan

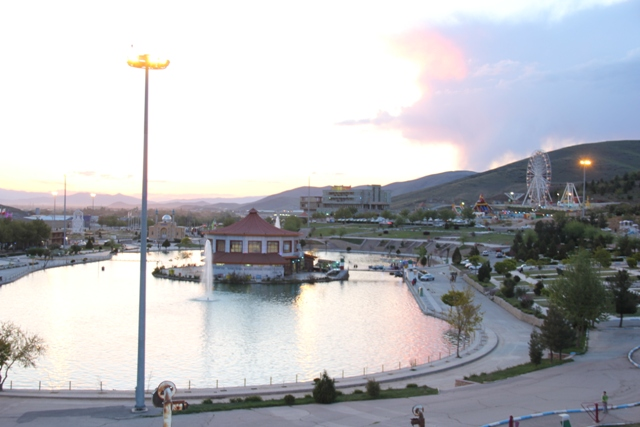
Kosar park of Malayer

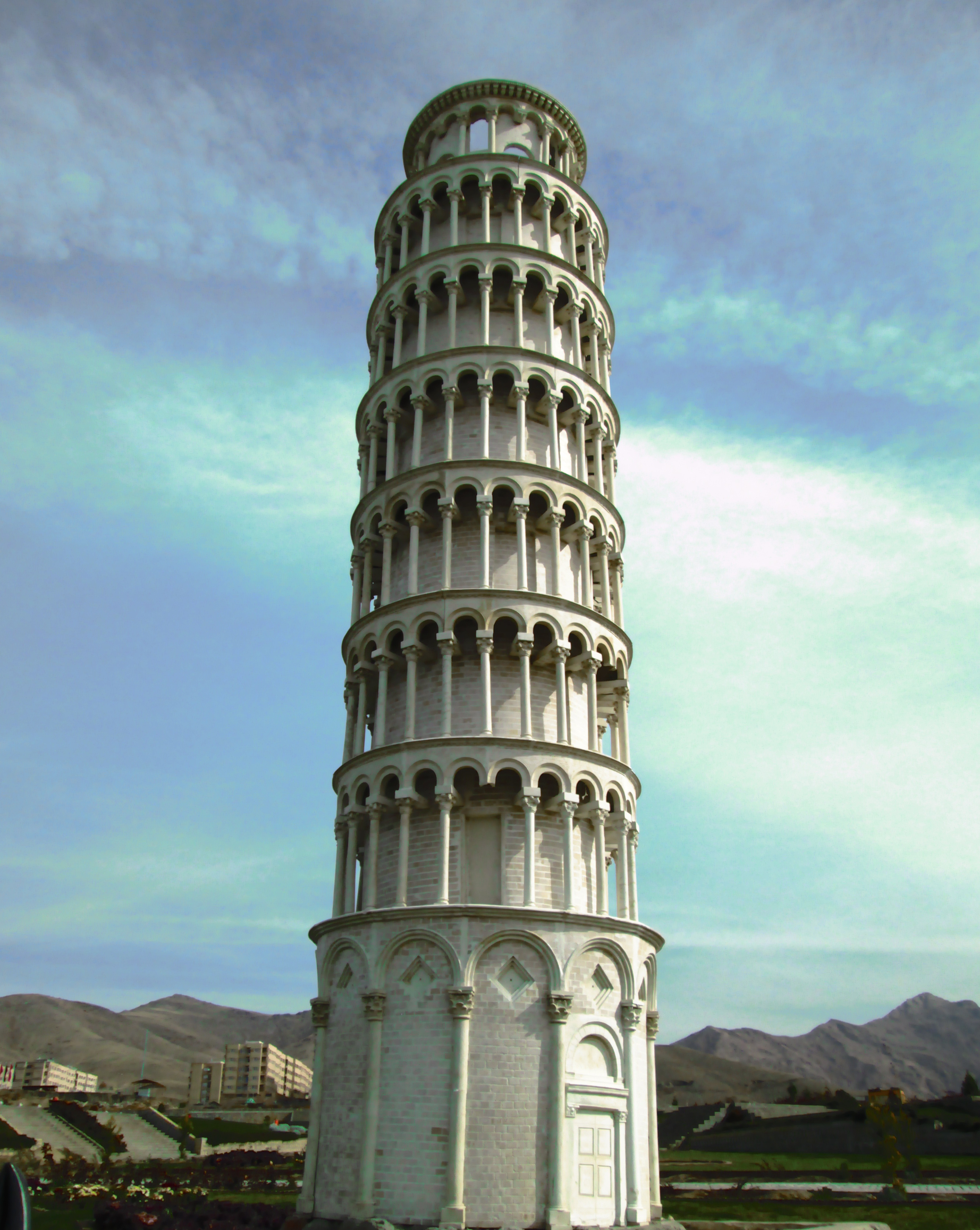
Replica of the Pisa tower in Malayer

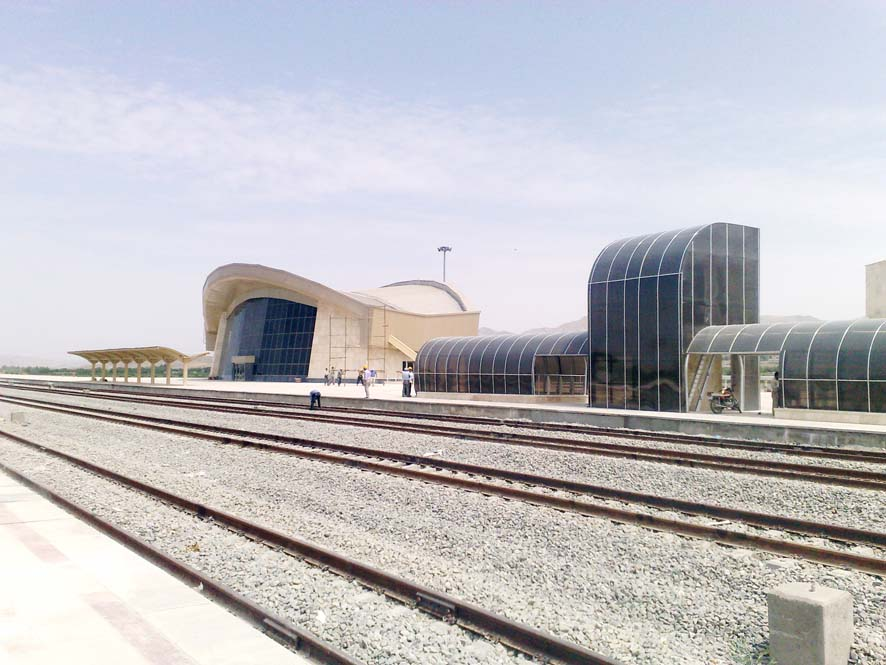
Railroad station

== See also ==
Media related to Malayer at Wikimedia Commons
