= Almahdi Rural District (Malayer County) =

Rural district in Hamadan province, Iran

Almahdi Rural District Persian: دهستان المهدئ
- Rural District
- Location within Iran
- Coordinates: 34°29′N 48°37′E
- Country: Iran
- Province: Hamadan
- County: Malayer
- District: Jowkar
- Established: 1987
- Capital: Hoseynabad-e Shamlu

Population (2016)
  - Total: 8,101
- Time zone: UTC+3:30 (IRST)

Almahdi Rural District (Persian: دهستان المهدئ) is in Jowkar District of Malayer County, Hamadan province, Iran. Its capital is the village of Hoseynabad-e Shamlu.

== Demographics ==
=== Population ===
At the time of the 2006 National Census, the rural district's population was 12,081 in 2,860 households. There were 11,027 inhabitants in 3,041 households at the following census of 2011. The 2016 census measured the population of the rural district as 8,101 in 2,667 households. The most populous of its nine villages was Aliabad-e Damaq (now a city), with 3,707 people.

=== Other villages in the rural district ===
- Deh-e Shaker
- Dehnow-e Aliabad
- Hasanabad-e Qush Bolagh
- Kusaj Khalil
- Qeshlaq-e Dehnow
- Zamanabad-e Mohammadabad
- Zirabiyeh
