= Jowzan Rural District =

Rural district in Hamadan province, Iran

Jowzan Rural District Persian: دهستان جوزان
- Rural District
- Location within Iran
- Coordinates: 34°17′N 49°00′E
- Country: Iran
- Province: Hamadan
- County: Malayer
- District: Central
- Established: 1990
- Capital: Jowzan

Population (2016)
  - Total: 6,659
- Time zone: UTC+3:30 (IRST)

Jowzan Rural District (Persian: دهستان جوزان) is in the Central District of Malayer County, Hamadan province, Iran. Its capital is the village of Jowzan.

== Demographics ==
=== Population ===
At the time of the 2006 National Census, the rural district's population was 8,324 in 2,198 households. There were 7,306 inhabitants in 2,207 households at the following census of 2011. The 2016 census measured the population of the rural district as 6,659 in 2,164 households. The most populous of its 12 villages was Jowzan, with 2,625 people.

== Economy ==
The economy is based on livestock, handicrafts and agriculture. Jowzan rugs has been declared in the global markets. One of the major products of the rural district is grape and raisin grapes to be exported to domestic and foreign market. Raisin production in the rural district and surrounding areas of Malayer, makes the region's reputation in producing and exporting these products.

=== Other villages in the rural district ===
- Babolqani
- Gamasa
- Gol Gol
- Kahriz
- Kheyrabad
- Koleh Bid
- Manizan
- Qaleh-ye Baba Khan
- Qaleh-ye Jowzan
- Tusk-e Olya
- Tusk-e Sofla
