= Juzjan, Iran =

Juzjan جوزجان
- Village
- Location within Iran
- Coordinates: 28°40′45″N 54°26′19″E
- Country: Iran
- Province: Fars
- County: Darab
- Bakhsh: Central
- Rural District: Nasrovan

Population (2006)
  - Total: 925
- Time zone: UTC+3:30 (IRST)
  - Summer (DST): UTC+4:30 (IRDT)

Juzjan (Persian: جوزجان, romanized: Jūzjān) is a village in Nasrovan Rural District, in the Central District of Darab County, Fars province, Iran. At the 2006 census, its population was 925, in 208 families.
