= Alamdar, Hamadan =

Alamdar علمدار
- Village
- Location within Iran
- Coordinates: 34°15′32″N 48°15′59″E
- Country: Iran
- Province: Hamadan
- County: Nahavand
- Bakhsh: Central
- Rural District: Tariq ol Eslam

Population (2006)
  - Total: 225
- Time zone: UTC+3:30 (IRST)
  - Summer (DST): UTC+4:30 (IRDT)

Alamdar (Persian: علمدار, also Romanized as ‘Alamdār) is a village in Tariq ol Eslam Rural District, in the Central District of Nahavand County, Hamadan Province, Iran. At the 2006 census, its population was 225, in 62 families.
