= Kuh Sardeh Rural District =

Rural district in Hamadan province, Iran

Kuh Sardeh Rural District Persian: دهستان كوه سرده
- Rural District
- Location within Iran
- Coordinates: 34°23′N 48°55′E
- Country: Iran
- Province: Hamadan
- County: Malayer
- District: Central
- Established: 1993
- Capital: Eznav

Population (2016)
  - Total: 8,084
- Time zone: UTC+3:30 (IRST)

Kuh Sardeh Rural District (Persian: دهستان كوه سرده) is in the Central District of Malayer County, Hamadan province, Iran. Its capital is the village of Eznav.

== Demographics ==
=== Population ===
At the time of the 2006 National Census, the rural district's population was 7,291 in 1,819 households. There were 7,935 inhabitants in 2,177 households at the following census of 2011. The 2016 census measured the population of the rural district as 8,084 in 2,491 households. The most populous of its 18 villages was Eznav, with 5,411 people.

=== Other villages in the rural district ===
- Baba Rais
- Emamzadeh Abdollah
- Ganjab
- Mahmudabad
- Qarah Tegini
- Varchaq
