= Jowkar District =

District in Hamadan province, Iran

Jowkar District Persian: بخش جوکار
- District
- Location within Iran
- Coordinates: 34°31′N 48°42′E
- Country: Iran
- Province: Hamadan
- County: Malayer
- Established: 1989
- Capital: Jowkar

Population (2016)
  - Total: 37,046
- Time zone: UTC+3:30 (IRST)

Jowkar District (Persian: بخش جوکار) is in Malayer County, Hamadan province, Iran. Its capital is the city of Jowkar.

== History ==
In 2011, Tork-e Sharqi Rural District was transferred to the Central District. The village of Aliabad-e Damaq was converted to a city in 2024.

== Demographics ==
=== Population ===
At the time of the 2006 National Census, the district's population was 52,445 in 12,332 households. The following census in 2011 counted 50,487 people in 13,875 households. The 2016 census measured the population of the district as 37,046 inhabitants in 11,326 households.

=== Administrative divisions ===
Jowkar District Population
Administrative Divisions	2006	2011	2016
Almahdi RD	12,081	11,027	8,101
Jowkar RD	6,100	5,394	4,218
Tork-e Gharbi RD	12,367	11,503	11,298
Tork-e Sharqi RD (Note: Transferred to the Central District)	11,003	10,814	
Aliabad-e Damaq (city) (Note: Became a city after the 2016 census)			
Azandarian (city)	8,685	9,324	11,171
Jowkar (city)	2,209	2,425	2,258
Total	52,445	50,487	37,046
RD = Rural District
