= Central District (Malayer County) =

District in Hamadan province, Iran

Central District (Malayer County) Persian: بخش مرکزی شهرستان ملایر
- District
- Location within Iran
- Coordinates: 34°21′N 48°52′E
- Country: Iran
- Province: Hamadan
- County: Malayer
- Capital: Malayer

Population (2016)
  - Total: 213,456
- Time zone: UTC+3:30 (IRST)

The Central District of Malayer County (Persian: بخش مرکزی شهرستان ملایر) is in Hamadan province, Iran. Its capital is the city of Malayer.

== History ==
In 2011, Tork-e Sharqi Rural District was transferred from Jowkar District to the Central District. The village of Eslamabad was converted to a city and renamed Eslamshahr-e Aqgol in 2017.

== Demographics ==
=== Population ===
At the time of the 2006 census, the district's population was 186,497 in 49,318 households. The following census in 2011 counted 194,255 people in 56,873 households. The 2016 census measured the population of the district as 213,456 inhabitants in 65,966 households.

=== Administrative divisions ===
Central District (Malayer County) Population
Administrative Divisions	2006	2011	2016
Haram Rud-e Olya RD	8,251	8,107	7,555
Jowzan RD	8,324	7,306	6,659
Kuh Sardeh RD	7,291	7,935	8,084
Muzaran RD	8,883	11,059	10,345
Tork-e Sharqi RD (Note: Transferred from Jowkar District)			10,576
Eslamshahr-e Aqgol (city) (Note: Formerly the village of Eslamabad; became a city after the 2016 census)			
Malayer (city)	153,748	159,848	170,237
Total	186,497	194,255	213,456
RD = Rural District
