= Malayer County =

County in Hamadan province, Iran

Malayer County Persian: شهرستان ملایر
- County
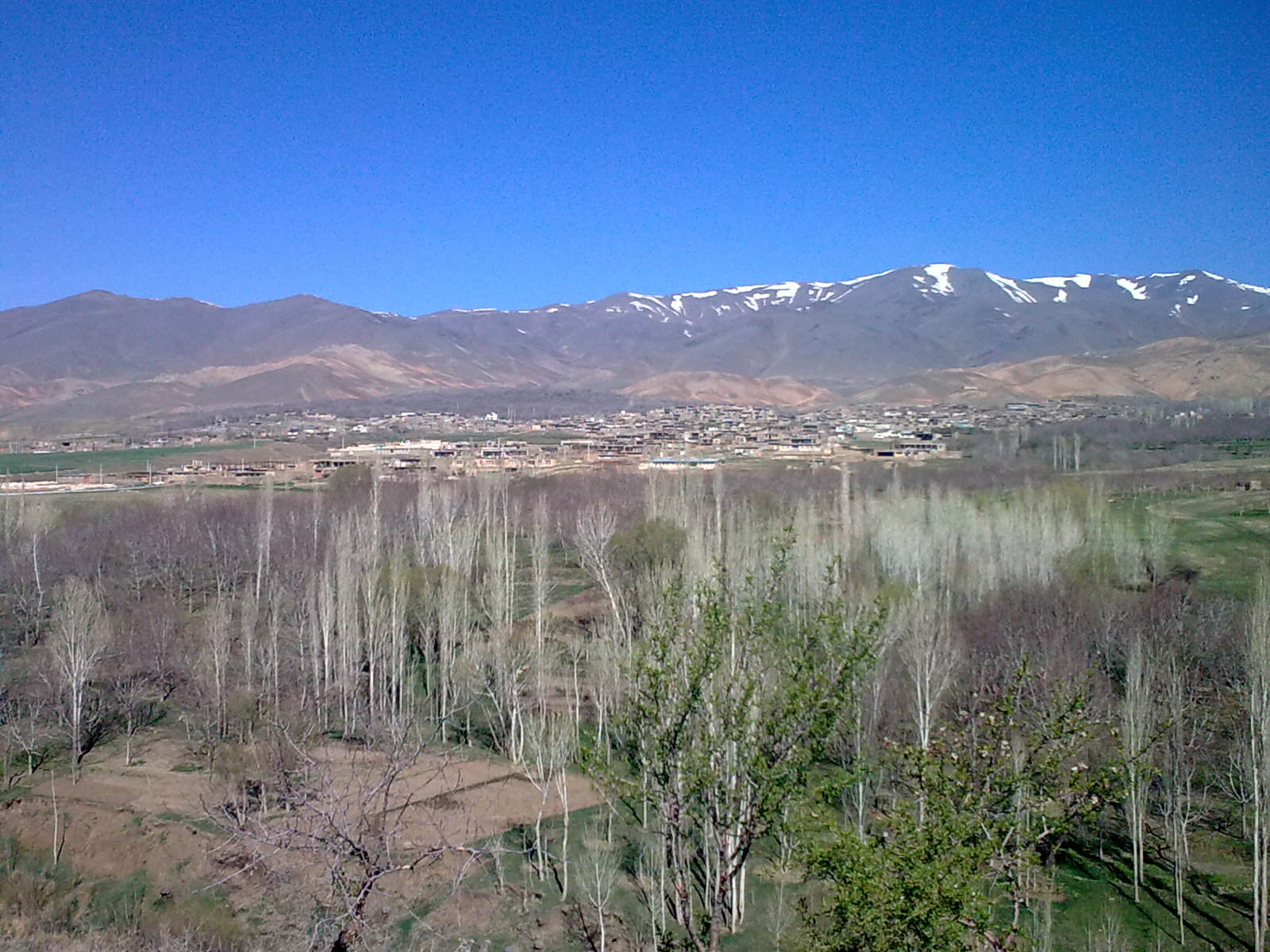
- Landscape near the city of Aliabad-e Damaq

- Location of Malayer County in Hamadan province (bottom, pink)

- Location of Hamadan province in Iran
- Coordinates: 34°20′N 48°46′E
- Country: Iran
- Province: Hamadan
- Capital: Malayer
- Districts: Central, Jowkar, Samen, Zand

Population (2016)
  - Total: 288,685
- Time zone: UTC+3:30 (IRST)

Malayer County (Persian: شهرستان ملایر) is in Hamadan province, Iran. Its capital is the city of Malayer.

== History ==
In 2011, Tork-e Sharqi Rural District was transferred from Jowkar District to the Central District.

The village of Eslamabad was converted to a city and renamed Eslamshahr-e Aqgol in 2017. The village of Aliabad-e Damaq became a city in 2024.

== Demographics ==
=== Population ===
At the time of the 2006 National Census, the county's population was 285,272 in 73,755 households. The following census in 2011 counted 287,982 people in 83,746 households. The 2016 census measured the population of the county as 288,685 in 89,762 households.

=== Administrative divisions ===
Malayer County's population history and administrative structure over three consecutive censuses are shown in the following table.

Malayer County Population
Administrative Divisions	2006	2011	2016
Central District	186,497	194,255	213,456
Haram Rud-e Olya RD	8,251	8,107	7,555
Jowzan RD	8,324	7,306	6,659
Kuh Sardeh RD	7,291	7,935	8,084
Muzaran RD	8,883	11,059	10,345
Tork-e Sharqi RD			10,576
Eslamshahr-e Aqgol (city) (Note: Formerly the village of Eslamabad; became a city after the 2016 census)			
Malayer (city)	153,748	159,848	170,237
Jowkar District	52,445	50,487	37,046
Almahdi RD	12,081	11,027	8,101
Jowkar RD	6,100	5,394	4,218
Tork-e Gharbi RD	12,367	11,503	11,298
Tork-e Sharqi RD	11,003	10,814	
Aliabad-e Damaq (city) (Note: Became a city after the 2016 census)			
Azandarian (city)	8,685	9,324	11,171
Jowkar (city)	2,209	2,425	2,258
Samen District	31,904	31,060	28,085
Avarzaman RD	6,337	6,199	5,667
Haram Rud-e Sofla RD	9,194	8,798	8,460
Samen RD	7,114	6,687	5,396
Sefidkuh RD	5,234	4,950	4,689
Samen (city)	4,025	4,426	3,873
Zand District	14,426	12,180	10,019
Kamazan-e Olya RD	4,434	3,564	2,964
Kamazan-e Sofla RD	4,985	4,405	3,776
Kamazan-e Vosta RD	4,163	3,486	2,658
Zangeneh (city) (Note: Formerly the village of Zanganeh-ye Olya)	844	725	621
Total	285,272	287,982	288,685
RD = Rural District

== See also ==
Media related to Malayer County at Wikimedia Commons
