= Hasanabad =

Hasanabad (also Hassanabad or Həsənabad) (Persian: حسن‌آباد) is a common name from villages in Iran and is also used in other countries. It may refer to:

== Iran ==
=== Alborz Province ===
- Hasanabad, Eshtehard, a village in Eshtehard County
- Hasanabad-e Majd ol Dolleh, a village in Nazarabad County
- Hasanabad, Savojbolagh, a village in Savojbolagh County

=== Ardabil Province ===
- Hasanabad, Ardabil, a village in Meshgin Shahr County

=== Bushehr Province ===
- Hasanabad, Bushehr, a village in Dashtestan County
- Hasanabad-e Abu ol Fath, a village in Deylam County

=== East Azerbaijan Province ===
- Hasanabad, Malekan, a village in Malekan County
- Hasanabad, Meyaneh, a village in Meyaneh County
- Hasanabad, Kaghazkonan, a village in Meyaneh County
- Hasanabad, Osku, a village in Osku County

=== Fars Province ===
==== Arsanjan County ====
- Hasanabad, Arsanjan, a village in Arsanjan County
- Hasanabad, Shurab, a village in Arsanjan County

==== Darab County ====
- Hasanabad, Bakhtajerd, a village in Darab County
- Hasanabad, Nasrovan, a village in Darab County
- Hasanabad, Paskhan, a village in Darab County
- Hasanabad-e Padam, a village in Darab County

==== Eqlid County ====
- Hasanabad, Eqlid, a village in Eqlid County
- Hasanabad District, in Eqlid County
- Hasanabad Rural District (Fars Province), in Eqlid County

==== Fasa County ====
- Hasanabad, Fasa, a village in Fasa County

==== Kazerun County ====
- Hasanabad, Kazerun, a village in Kazerun County
- Hasanabad, Balyan, a village in Kazerun County
- Hasanabad, Khesht, a village in Kazerun County
- Hasanabad-e Abu ol Hasani, a village in Kazerun County
- Hasanabad-e Olya, Fars, a village in Kazerun County
- Hasanabad-e Sofla, Fars, a village in Kazerun County
- Hasanabad, alternate name of Hoseynabad, Kazerun, a village in Kazerun County

==== Kharameh County ====
- Hasanabad, Kharameh, a village in Kharameh County

==== Lamerd County ====
- Hasanabad-e Tarman, a village in Lamerd County

==== Larestan County ====
- Hasanabad, Larestan, a village in Larestan County
- Hasanabad-e Margemari, a village in Larestan County

==== Marvdasht County ====
- Hasanabad, Majdabad, a village in Marvdasht County
- Hasanabad, Naqsh-e Rostam, a village in Marvdasht County
- Hasanabad, Rudbal, a village in Marvdasht County
- Hasanabad, Seyyedan, a village in Marvdasht County
- Hasanabad-e Tall Kamin, a village in Marvdasht County

==== Neyriz County ====
- Hasanabad, Abadeh Tashk, a village in Neyriz County
- Hasanabad, Neyriz, a village in Neyriz County
- Hasanabad, Qatruyeh, a village in Neyriz County

==== Pasargad County ====
- Hasanabad, Pasargad, a village in Pasargad County

==== Shiraz County ====
- Hasanabad, Shiraz, a village in Shiraz County

=== Gilan Province ===
- Hasanabad, Langarud, a village in Langarud County
- Hasanabad, Rasht, a village in Rasht County

=== Golestan Province ===
- Hasanabad, Golestan, a village in Gonbad-e Qabus County

=== Hamadan Province ===
- Hasanabad-e Emam, a village in Asadabad County
- Hasanabad, Famenin, a village in Famenin County
- Hasanabad-e Sheverin, a village in Hamadan County
- Hasanabad, Kabudarahang, a village in Kabudarahang County
- Hasanabad, Shirin Su, a village in Kabudarahang County
- Hasanabad-e Qush Bolagh, a village in Malayer County
- Hasanabad-e Shamlu, a village in Malayer County
- Hasanabad, alternate name of Gerdian, Hamadan, a village in Nahavand County
- Hasanabad, alternate name of Hoseynabad-e Serkan, a village in Nahavand County
- Hasanabad, Razan, a village in Razan County

=== Hormozgan Province ===
- Hasanabad, Bandar Lengeh, a village in Bandar Lengeh County
- Hasanabad, Hajjiabad, a village in Hajjiabad County
- Hasanabad, Ahmadi, a village in Hajjiabad County
- Hasanabad-e Ziarat, a village in Minab County

=== Isfahan Province ===
- Hasanabad, Aran va Bidgol, a village in Aran va Bidgol County
- Hasanabad, Garmsir, a village in Ardestan County
- Hasanabad, Olya, a village in Ardestan County
- Hasanabad, Falavarjan, a village in Falavarjan County
- Hasanabad, Isfahan, a city in Isfahan County
- Hasanabad, Qahab-e Jonubi, a village in Isfahan County
- Hasanabad, Khvansar, a village in Khvansar County
- Hasanabad, Mobarakeh, a village in Mobarakeh County
- Hasanabad-e Tavakkoli, a village in Nain County
- Hasanabad, Natanz, a village in Natanz County
- Hasanabad-e Abrizeh, a village in Tiran and Kaarvan County
- Hasanabad-e Kohneh, Isfahan, a village in Tiran and Karvan County
- Hasanabad-e Olya, Isfahan, a village in Tiran and Karvan County
- Hasanabad-e Vosta, a village in Tiran and Karvan County

=== Kerman Province ===
==== Anbarabad County ====
- Hasanabad, Esmaili, a village in Anbarabad County
- Hasanabad-e Nazarian, a village in Anbarabad County
- Hasanabad-e Yek, Anbarabad, a village in Anbarabad County
- Hasanabad, Jebalbarez-e Jonubi, a village in Anbarabad County

==== Arzuiyeh County ====
- Hasanabad, Arzuiyeh, a village in Arzuiyeh County
- Hasanabad, Soghan, a village in Arzuiyeh County

==== Baft County ====
- Hasanabad-e Olya, Kerman, a village in Baft County
- Hasanabad-e Sofla, Kerman, a village in Baft County

==== Bardsir County ====
- Hasanabad, Negar, a village in Bardsir County

==== Fahraj County ====
- Hasanabad, Fahraj, a village in Fahraj County
- Hasanabad-e Chah Degan, a village in Fahraj County
- Hasanabad-e Deh Gavi, a village in Fahraj County

==== Faryab County ====
- Hasanabad, Faryab, a village in Faryab County

==== Kerman County ====
- Hasanabad, Golbaf, a village in Kerman County

==== Kuhbanan County ====
- Hasanabad-e Qotbi, a village in Kuhbanan County

==== Narmashir County ====
- Hasanabad-e Dabirnezam, a village in Narmashir County
- Hasanabad-e Deh Koreh, a village in Narmashir County

==== Rafsanjan County ====
- Hasanabad, Ferdows, a village in Rafsanjan County
- Hasanabad-e Navvab, a village in Rafsanjan County
- Hasanabad-e Nushabad, a village in Rafsanjan County
- Hasanabad-e Zandi, a village in Rafsanjan County

==== Rigan County ====
- Hasanabad, Gonbaki, a village in Rigan County
- Hassanabad-e Ab Shur, a village in Rigan County
- Hasanabad-e Jahanabad, a village in Rigan County

==== Rudbar-e Jonubi County ====
- Hasanabad, Rudbar-e Jonubi, a village in Rudbar-e Jonubi County

==== Shahr-e Babak County ====
- Hasanabad, Shahr-e Babak, a village in Shahr-e Babak County

==== Sirjan County ====
- Hasanabad, Mahmudabad-e Seyyed, a village in Sirjan County
- Hasanabad-e Mehrab Jan, a village in Sirjan County
- Hasanabad-e Yek, Sirjan, a village in Sirjan County
- Hasanabad-e Yek, Saadatabad, a village in Sirjan County

=== Kermanshah Province ===
- Hasanabad, Eslamabad-e Gharb, a village in Eslamabad-e Gharb County
- Hasanabad Rural District (Eslamabad-e Gharb County)
- Hasanabad, Kangavar, a village in Kangavar County
- Hasanabad, Kermanshah, a village in Kermanshah County
- Hasanabad, Ravansar, a village in Ravansar County
- Hasanabad-e Karah, a village in Ravansar County
- Hasanabad Integrated Farm Town, a village in Ravansar County
- Hasanabad Rural District (Ravansar County)
- Hasanabad-e Olya, Kermanshah, a village in Sahneh County
- Hasanabad-e Sofla, Kermanshah, a village in Sahneh County
- Hasanabad, Sonqor, a village in Sonqor County
- Hasanabad, Kolyai, a village in Sonqor County

=== Khuzestan Province ===
- Hasanabad, Andika, a village in Andika County
- Hasanabad, Masjed Soleyman, a village in Masjed Soleyman County
- Hasanabad, Shushtar, a village in Shushtar County

=== Kohgiluyeh and Boyer-Ahmad Province ===
- Hasanabad-e Tabarqu, a village in Boyer-Ahmad County
- Hasanabad-e Tang Sorkh, a village in Boyer-Ahmad County
- Hasanabad-e Kareyak, a village in Dana County

=== Kurdistan Province ===
- Hasanabad, Baneh, a village in Baneh County
- Hasanabad, Bijar, a village in Bijar County
- Hasanabad-e Charuq, a village in Bijar County
- Hasanabad-e Yasukand, a city in Bijar County
- Hasanabad, Dehgolan, a village in Dehgolan County
- Hasanabad, Qorveh, a village in Qorveh County
- Hasanabad, Sanandaj, a village in Sanandaj County
- Hasanabad, Saqqez, a village in Saqqez County
- Hasanabad, Ziviyeh, a village in Saqqez County

=== Lorestan Province ===
- Hasanabad, Aligudarz, a village in Aligudarz County
- Hasanabad-e Bala, Lorestan, a village in Delfan County
- Hasanabad Bey Baba, a village in Delfan County
- Hasanabad-e Sanjabi, a village in Delfan County
- Hasanabad, Azna, a village in Khorramabad County
- Hasanabad, Dehpir, a village in Khorramabad County
- Hasanabad, Koregah-e Gharbi, a village in Khorramabad County
- Hasanabad-e Gilavand, a village in Khorramabad County
- Hasanabad, Honam, a village in Selseleh County
- Hasanabad, Qaleh-ye Mozaffari, a village in Selseleh County
- Hasanabad, alternate name of Shirvan, Lorestan

=== Markazi Province ===
- Hasanabad, Arak, a village in Arak County
- Hasanabad-e Band, a village in Saveh County
- Hasanabad, Sarband, a village in Shazand County
- Hasanabad-e Qarah Darband, a village in Zarandieh County

=== Mazandaran Province ===
- Hasanabad, Amol, a village in Amol County
- Hasanabad, Mahmudabad, a village in Mahmudabad County
- Hasanabad, Nowshahr, a village in Nowshahr County
- Hasanabad, Kojur, a village in Nowshahr County
- Hasanabad, Sari, a village in Sari County

=== North Khorasan Province ===
- Hasanabad, Garmkhan, a village in Bojnord County
- Hasanabad, Raz and Jargalan, a village in Bojnord County
- Hasanabad, Azari, a village in Esfarayen County
- Hasanabad, Esfarayen, a village in Esfarayen County
- Hasanabad-e Chenar Sukhteh, a village in Esfarayen County
- Hasanabad, Maneh and Samalqan, a village in Maneh and Samalqan County
- Hasanabad, alternate name of Hasan Mast, a village in Maneh and Samalqan County

=== Qazvin Province ===
- Hasanabad-e Kalej, a village in Basharyat District, Abyek County
- Hasanabad, Avaj, a village in Avaj District, Buin Zahra County
- Hasanabad, Dashtabi, a village in Dashtabi District, Buin Zahra County
- Hasanabad, Qazvin, a village in the Central District of Qazvin County
- Hasanabad, Alamut-e Gharbi, a village in Alamut-e Gharbi District, Qazvin County
- Hasanabad, Rudbar-e Alamut, a village in Rudbar-e Alamut District, Qazvin County
- Hasanabad, Tarom Sofla, a village in Tarom Sofla District, Qazvin County
- Hasanabad-e Sadat, a village in Takestan County

=== Qom Province ===
- Hasanabad, Khalajestan, a village in Khalajastan District, Qom County
- Hasanabad, Salafchegan, a village in Salafchegan District, Qom County
- Hasanabad, alternate name of Hoseynabad-e Mish Mast

=== Razavi Khorasan Province ===
==== Bardaskan County ====
- Hasanabad, Bardaskan, a village in Bardaskan County

==== Chenaran County ====
- Hasanabad-e Amelzadeh, a village in Chenaran County
- Hasanabad-e Manqashali, a village in Chenaran County

==== Dargaz County ====
- Hasanabad, Dargaz, a village in Dargaz County

==== Fariman County ====
- Hasanabad, Fariman, a village in Fariman County
- Hasanabad, Qalandarabad, a village in Fariman County
- Hasanabad-e Sufi, a village in Fariman County

==== Firuzeh County ====
- Hasanabad-e Salar, a village in Firuzeh County

==== Kalat County ====
- Hasanabad-e Layen-e Now, a village in Kalat County

==== Khoshab County ====
- Hasanabad, Khoshab, a village in Khoshab County

==== Khvaf County ====
- Hasanabad, Jolgeh Zozan, a village in Khvaf County
- Hasanabad, Salami, a village in Khvaf County

==== Mahvelat County ====
- Hasanabad, Mahvelat, a village in Mahvelat County

==== Mashhad County ====
- Hasanabad, Abravan, a village in Mashhad County
- Hasanabad, Ahmadabad, a village in Mashhad County
- Hasanabad, Mashhad, a village in Mashhad County
- Hasanabad, Meyami, a village in Mashhad County
- Hasanabad-e Gorji, a village in Mashhad County

==== Nishapur County ====
- Hasanabad, Nishapur, a village in Nishapur County
- Hasanabad, Miyan Jolgeh, a village in Nishapur County
- Hasanabad-e Belher, a village in Nishapur County
- Hasanabad-e Emam Jomeh, a village in Nishapur County
- Hasanabad-e Sabrow, a village in Nishapur County
- Hasanabad-e Sar Tappeh, a village in Nishapur County

==== Quchan County ====
- Hasanabad, Quchan, a village in Quchan County

==== Sabzevar County ====
- Hasanabad, Beyhaq, a village in Sabzevar County
- Hasanabad, Rob-e Shamat, a village in Sabzevar County

==== Torbat-e Jam County ====
- Hasanabad, Torbat-e Jam, a village in Torbat-e Jam County
- Hasanabad, Nasrabad, a village in Torbat-e Jam County
- Hasanabad, Salehabad, a village in Torbat-e Jam County
- Hasanabad-e Aqa Beyk, a village in Torbat-e Jam County
- Hasanabad-e Kohneh, a village in Torbat-e Jam County

==== Torqabeh and Shandiz County ====
- Hasanabad, Torqabeh and Shandiz, a village in Torqabeh and Shandiz County

=== Semnan Province ===
- Hasanabad, Amirabad, a village in Damghan County
- Hasanabad, Garmsar, a village in Garmsar County
- Hasanabad, Semnan, a village in Semnan County

=== Sistan and Baluchestan Province ===
- Hasanabad, Dalgan, a village in Dalgan County
- Hasanabad-e Dastgerd, a village in Khash County
- Hasanabad-e Shandak, a village in Khash County

=== South Khorasan Province ===
- Hasanabad-e Mian, a village in Birjand County
- Hasanabad-e Pain, a village in Birjand County
- Hasanabad, Darmian, a village in Darmian County
- Hasanabad, Ferdows, South Khorasan, a village in Ferdows County
- Hasanabad-e Sar Kal, a village in Nehbandan County
- Hasanabad, Arabkhaneh, a village in Nehbandan County
- Hasanabad-e Korq-e Sang, a village in Nehbandan County
- Hasanabad, Qaen, a village in Qaen County
- Hasanabad, Dastgerdan, a village in Tabas County
- Hasanabad (1), Deyhuk, a village in Tabas County
- Hasanabad Qavam, a village in Tabas County
- Hasanabad, Zirkuh, a village in Zirkuh County
- Hasanabad, Zohan, a village in Zirkuh County

=== Tehran Province ===
- Hasanabad, Iran, a city in Rey County
- Hasanabad, Tehran, a neighborhood of Tehran, Iran
- Hasanabad-e Baqeraf, a village in Tehran County
- Hasanabad-e Khaleseh, a village in Eslamshahr County
- Hasanabad-e Kuh Gach, a village in Varamin County
- Hasanabad-e Mir Hashemi, a village in Malard County
- Hasanabad Rural District (Ray County)

=== West Azerbaijan Province ===
- Hasanabad, Bukan, a village in Bukan County
- Hasanabad, Miandoab, a village in Miandoab County
- Hasanabad, Oshnavieh, a village in Oshnavieh County
- Hasanabad, Sardasht, a village in Sardasht County
- Hasanabad, Takab, a village in Takab County
- Hasanabad, Urmia, a village in Urmia County
- Hasanabad, Silvaneh, a village in Urmia County
- Hasanabad, Sumay-ye Beradust, a village in Urmia County

=== Yazd Province ===
==== Ardakan County ====
- Hasanabad, Aqda, a village in Ardakan County
- Hasanabad, Kharanaq, a village in Ardakan County
- Hasanabad-e Anaraki, a village in Ardakan County

==== Khatam County ====
- Hasanabad, Khatam, a village in Khatam County
- Hasanabad, alternate name of Hoseynabad, Khatam, a village in Khatam County

==== Meybod County ====
- Hasanabad, Meybod, a village in Meybod County

==== Saduq County ====
- Hasanabad, Saduq, a village in Saduq County

==== Taft County ====
- Hasanabad, Taft, a village in Taft County
- Hasanabad-e Darreh Zereshk, a village in Taft County
- Hasanabad-e Marshad, a village in Taft County

=== Zanjan Province ===
- Hasanabad, Khodabandeh, a village in Khodabandeh County
- Hasanabad, Mahneshan, a village in Mahneshan County
- Hasanabad-e Jadid, a village in Mahneshan County
- Hasanabad-e Qadim, a village in Mahneshan County
- Hasanabad, Zanjan, a village in Zanjan County

== Other countries ==
=== Azerbaijan ===
- Həsənabad

=== India ===
- Hasanabad, Mumbai, a district in Mazagaon, South Mumbai
- Kalaburagi, a city in the eponymous Kalaburagi district, known in mediaeval times as Hasanabad

=== Pakistan ===
- Hassanabad, Chorbat, Baltistan
- Hassanabad, Hunza

== See also ==
- Hasanabad-e Kohneh (disambiguation)
- Hasanabad Rural District (disambiguation)
- Hasnabad (community development block), an administrative division in Basirhat subdivision of North 24 Parganas district in the Indian state of West Bengal
- Hosenabad (disambiguation)
- Hoseynabad (disambiguation)
- Hussainabad (disambiguation)
