= Hasanabad-e Olya =

Hasanabad-e Olya or Hasan Abad Olya (Persian: حسن ابادعليا) may refer to:

- Hasanabad-e Olya, Fars
- Hasanabad-e Olya, Isfahan
- Hasanabad-e Olya, Kerman, in Baft County
- Hasan Abad Olya, Kerman, in Rafsanjan County
- Hasanabad-e Olya, Kermanshah
- Hasanabad-e Olya, South Khorasan
- Hasanabad-e Olya, West Azerbaijan
