= Hasanabad-e Sofla =

Hasanabad-e Sofla (Persian: حسن ابادسفلي) may refer to:

- Hasanabad-e Sofla, Fars
- Hasanabad-e Sofla, Semirom, Isfahan Province
- Hasanabad-e Sofla, Kerman
- Hasanabad-e Sofla, Kermanshah

== See also ==
- Hasanabad-e Pain
