= Nasimabad =

Nasimabad (Persian: نسيم اباد) may refer to:

- Nasimabad, Isfahan
- Nasimabad-e Bala, Isfahan Province
- Nasimabad, Qazvin
- Nasimabad, Razavi Khorasan
