= Hasanabad-e Pain (disambiguation) =

Hasanabad-e Pain is a village in South Khorasan Province, Iran.

Hasanabad-e Pain (Persian: حسن ابادپايين) may also refer to:

- Hasanabad-e Pain, Fars
- Hasanabad-e Pain, Semirom, Isfahan Province
- Hasanabad-e Pain, Tiran and Karvan, Isfahan Province
