= Hasanabad-e Bala =

Hasanabad-e Bala (Persian: حسن ابادبالا) may refer to:

- Hasanabad-e Bala, Fars
- Hasanabad-e Bala, Isfahan
- Hasanabad-e Bala, Kerman
- Hasanabad-e Bala, Lorestan
