= Shandak =

Shandak (Persian: شندك), also rendered as Shandaq, also known as Shandak Ghaleh Bid or Shandak Morad Abad, may refer to:

- Hasanabad-e Shandak
- Jadidabad-e Shandak
