= Mirabad, Tiran and Karvan =

Village in Isfahan province, Iran

Mirabad Persian: ميراباد
- Village
- Location within Iran
- Coordinates: 32°51′43″N 51°02′43″E
- Country: Iran
- Province: Isfahan
- County: Tiran and Karvan
- District: Karvan
- Rural District: Karvan-e Sofla

Population (2016)
  - Total: 2,758
- Time zone: UTC+3:30 (IRST)

Mirabad (Persian: ميراباد) (Note: Also romanized as Mīrābād) is a village in Karvan-e Sofla Rural District (Note: Formerly Karvan-e Vosta Rural District) of Karvan District in Tiran and Karvan County, Isfahan province, Iran.

== Demographics ==
=== Population ===
At the time of the 2006 National Census, the village's population was 2,223 in 666 households. The following census in 2011 counted 2,536 people in 747 households. The 2016 census measured the population of the village as 2,758 people in 838 households, the most populous in its rural district.
