= Gonahran =

Village in Isfahan province, Iran

Gonahran Persian: گنهران
- Village
- Location within Iran
- Coordinates: 32°58′56″N 50°42′43″E
- Country: Iran
- Province: Isfahan
- County: Tiran and Karvan
- District: Karvan
- Rural District: Karvan-e Olya

Population (2016)
  - Total: 752
- Time zone: UTC+3:30 (IRST)

Gonahran (Persian: گنهران) (Note: Also romanized as Gonahrān and Gonharān; also known as Golharān, Gūlhārūn, and Qolharān) is a village in Karvan-e Olya Rural District of Karvan District in Tiran and Karvan County, Isfahan province, Iran.

== Demographics ==
=== Population ===
At the time of the 2006 National Census, the village's population was 1,021 in 286 households. The following census in 2011 counted 881 people in 284 households. The 2016 census measured the population of the village as 752 people in 246 households.
