= Golab, Isfahan =

Village in Isfahan province, Iran

Golab Persian: گلاب
- Village
- Location within Iran
- Coordinates: 32°48′21″N 50°52′44″E
- Country: Iran
- Province: Isfahan
- County: Tiran and Karvan
- District: Karvan
- Rural District: Karvan-e Sofla

Population (2016)
  - Total: 335
- Time zone: UTC+3:30 (IRST)

Golab (Persian: گلاب) (Note: Also romanized as Golāb) is a village in Karvan-e Sofla Rural District (Note: Formerly Karvan-e Vosta Rural District) of Karvan District in Tiran and Karvan County, Isfahan province, Iran.

== Demographics ==
=== Population ===
At the time of the 2006 National Census, the village's population was 341 in 83 households. The following census in 2011 counted 342 people in 96 households. The 2016 census measured the population of the village as 335 people in 101 households.
