= Dowlatabad, Tiran and Karvan =

Village in Isfahan province, Iran

Dowlatabad Persian: دولت اباد
- Village
- Location within Iran
- Coordinates: 32°54′44″N 50°45′27″E
- Country: Iran
- Province: Isfahan
- County: Tiran and Karvan
- District: Karvan
- Rural District: Karvan-e Olya

Population (2016)
  - Total: 1,772
- Time zone: UTC+3:30 (IRST)

Dowlatabad (Persian: دولت اباد) (Note: Also romanized as Dowlatābād and Dulatābād; also known as Daulatābād) is a village in Karvan-e Olya Rural District of Karvan District in Tiran and Karvan County, Isfahan province, Iran.

== Demographics ==
=== Population ===
At the time of the 2006 National Census, the village's population was 1,931 in 500 households. The following census in 2011 counted 1,964 people in 556 households. The 2016 census measured the population of the village as 1,772 people in 540 households. It was the most populous village in its rural district.
