= Mohammadiyeh, Tiran and Karvan =

Village in Isfahan province, Iran

Mohammadiyeh Persian: محمديه
- Village
- Location within Iran
- Coordinates: 32°49′03″N 51°00′15″E
- Country: Iran
- Province: Isfahan
- County: Tiran and Karvan
- District: Karvan
- Rural District: Karvan-e Sofla

Population (2016)
  - Total: 1,351
- Time zone: UTC+3:30 (IRST)

Mohammadiyeh (Persian: محمديه) (Note: Also romanized as Moḩammadīyeh; also known as Moḩammadī and Muhammadīyeh) is a village in Karvan-e Sofla Rural District (Note: Formerly Karvan-e Vosta Rural District) of Karvan District in Tiran and Karvan County, Isfahan province, Iran.

== Demographics ==
=== Population ===
At the time of the 2006 National Census, the village's population was 1,154 in 321 households. The following census in 2011 counted 1,305 people in 363 households. The 2016 census measured the population of the village as 1,351 people in 420 households.
