= Suran, Isfahan =

Village in Isfahan province, Iran

Suran Persian: سوران
- Village
- Location within Iran
- Coordinates: 32°48′09″N 50°56′08″E
- Country: Iran
- Province: Isfahan
- County: Tiran and Karvan
- District: Karvan
- Rural District: Karvan-e Sofla

Population (2016)
  - Total: 844
- Time zone: UTC+3:30 (IRST)

Suran (Persian: سوران) (Note: Also romanized as Sūrān) is a village in Karvan-e Sofla Rural District (Note: Formerly Karvan-e Vosta Rural District) of Karvan District in Tiran and Karvan County, Isfahan province, Iran.

== Demographics ==
=== Population ===
At the time of the 2006 National Census, the village's population was 799 in 206 households. The following census in 2011 counted 941 people in 243 households. The 2016 census measured the population of the village as 844 people in 252 households.
