= Cheshmeh-ye Ahmad Reza =

Village in Isfahan province, Iran

Cheshmeh-ye Ahmad Reza Persian: چشمه احمدرضا
- Village
- Location within Iran
- Coordinates: 32°50′01″N 50°51′08″E
- Country: Iran
- Province: Isfahan
- County: Tiran and Karvan
- District: Karvan
- Rural District: Karvan-e Olya

Population (2016)
  - Total: 379
- Time zone: UTC+3:30 (IRST)

Cheshmeh-ye Ahmad Reza (Persian: چشمه احمدرضا) (Note: Also romanized as Cheshmeh Aḩmad Reẕā and Cheshmeh-ye Aḩmad Reẕā; also known as Cheshmeh) is a village in Karvan-e Olya Rural District of Karvan District in Tiran and Karvan County, Isfahan province, Iran.

== Demographics ==
=== Population ===
At the time of the 2006 National Census, the village's population was 448 in 132 households. The following census in 2011 counted 415 people in 141 households. The 2016 census measured the population of the village as 379 people in 136 households.
