= Alvar, Isfahan =

Village in Isfahan province, Iran

Alvar Persian: الور
- Village
- Location within Iran
- Coordinates: 32°51′33″N 50°52′21″E
- Country: Iran
- Province: Isfahan
- County: Tiran and Karvan
- District: Karvan
- Rural District: Karvan-e Olya

Population (2016)
  - Total: 591
- Time zone: UTC+3:30 (IRST)

Alvar (Persian: الور) (Note: Also romanized as Alwar) is a village in Karvan-e Olya Rural District of Karvan District in Tiran and Karvan County, Isfahan province, Iran.

== Demographics ==
=== Population ===
At the time of the 2006 National Census, the village's population was 670 in 172 households. The following census in 2011 counted 660 people in 197 households. The 2016 census measured the population of the village as 591 people in 182 households.
