= Mobarakeh, Tiran and Karvan =

Village in Isfahan province, Iran

Mobarakeh Persian: مباركه
- Village
- Location within Iran
- Coordinates: 32°49′21″N 50°58′43″E
- Country: Iran
- Province: Isfahan
- County: Tiran and Karvan
- District: Karvan
- Rural District: Karvan-e Sofla

Population (2016)
  - Total: 1,794
- Time zone: UTC+3:30 (IRST)

Mobarakeh (Persian: مباركه) (Note: Also romanized as Mobārakeh; also known as Mobārak and Mubārak) is a village in Karvan-e Sofla Rural District (Note: Formerly Karvan-e Vosta Rural District) of Karvan District in Tiran and Karvan County, Isfahan province, Iran.

== Demographics ==
=== Population ===
At the time of the 2006 National Census, the village's population was 1,504 in 386 households. The following census in 2011 counted 1,747 people in 500 households. The 2016 census measured the population of the village as 1,794 people in 530 households.
