= Taqiabad, Karvan =

Village in Isfahan province, Iran

Taqiabad Persian: تقی‌آباد
- Village
- Location within Iran
- Coordinates: 32°56′03″N 50°42′12″E
- Country: Iran
- Province: Isfahan
- County: Tiran and Karvan
- District: Karvan
- Rural District: Karvan-e Olya

Population (2016)
  - Total: 146
- Time zone: UTC+3:30 (IRST)

Taqiabad (Persian: تقی‌آباد) (Note: Also romanized as Taqīābād) is a village in Karvan-e Olya Rural District of Karvan District in Tiran and Karvan County, Isfahan province, Iran.

== Demographics ==
=== Population ===
At the time of the 2006 National Census, the village's population was 224 in 66 households. The following census in 2011 counted 209 people in 69 households. The 2016 census measured the population of the village as 146 people in 53 households.
