= Kard (disambiguation) =

A kard is a kind of Mughal sword.

Kard may also refer to:

- Kard, Armenia
- Kard-e Bala
- Kard-e Pain
- Kard (group), South Korean pop group
- KARD (TV), a television station
- The KRISS KARD, a prototype pistol
