= Hasanabad-e Kohneh =

Hasanabad-e Kohneh (Persian: حسن آباد كهنه) may refer to:

- Hasanabad-e Kohneh, Isfahan
- Hasanabad-e Kohneh, Kurdistan
- Hasanabad-e Kohneh, Razavi Khorasan
