= Dowtu, Isfahan =

Village in Isfahan province, Iran

Dowtu Persian: دوتو
- Village
- Location within Iran
- Coordinates: 32°50′36″N 50°48′07″E
- Country: Iran
- Province: Isfahan
- County: Tiran and Karvan
- District: Karvan
- Rural District: Karvan-e Olya

Population (2016)
  - Total: 670
- Time zone: UTC+3:30 (IRST)

Dowtu (Persian: دوتو) (Note: Also romanized as Dowtū; formerly known as Dowtūy-e Aḩmad Khalaj; also known as Dowtūn) is a village in Karvan-e Olya Rural District of Karvan District in Tiran and Karvan County, Isfahan province, Iran.

== Demographics ==
=== Population ===
At the time of the 2006 National Census, the village's population was 694 in 201 households. The following census in 2011 counted 670 people in 212 households. The 2016 census again measured the population of the village as 670 people in 212 households.
