= Qahrizjan =

Village in Isfahan province, Iran

Qahrizjan Persian: قهريزجان
- Village
- Location within Iran
- Coordinates: 32°48′59″N 50°54′05″E
- Country: Iran
- Province: Isfahan
- County: Tiran and Karvan
- District: Karvan
- Rural District: Karvan-e Sofla

Population (2016)
  - Total: 1,976
- Time zone: UTC+3:30 (IRST)

Qahrizjan (Persian: قهريزجان) (Note: Also romanized as Qahrīzjān; also known as Kārīzgun and Mahrīz Jān) is a village in Karvan-e Sofla Rural District (Note: Formerly Karvan-e Vosta Rural District) of Karvan District in Tiran and Karvan County, Isfahan province, Iran.

== Demographics ==
=== Population ===
At the time of the 2006 National Census, the village's population was 1,779 in 448 households. The following census in 2011 counted 1,889 people in 549 households. The 2016 census measured the population of the village as 1,976 people in 632 households.
