= Hoseynabad, Tiran and Karvan =

Village in Isfahan province, Iran

Hoseynabad Persian: حسين اباد
- Village
- Location within Iran
- Coordinates: 32°47′57″N 50°54′48″E
- Country: Iran
- Province: Isfahan
- County: Tiran and Karvan
- District: Karvan
- Rural District: Karvan-e Sofla

Population (2016)
  - Total: 1,384
- Time zone: UTC+3:30 (IRST)

Hoseynabad (Persian: حسين اباد) (Note: Also romanized as Ḩoseynābād; also known as Ḩoseynābād-e Karvan and Husainābād) is a village in Karvan-e Sofla Rural District (Note: Formerly Karvan-e Vosta Rural District) of Karvan District in Tiran and Karvan County, Isfahan province, Iran.

== Demographics ==
=== Population ===
At the time of the 2006 National Census, the village's population was 1,166 in 319 households. The following census in 2011 counted 1,308 people in 398 households. The 2016 census measured the population of the village as 1,384 people in 425 households.
