= Afjan =

Village in Isfahan province, Iran

Afjan Persian: افجان
- Village
- Location within Iran
- Coordinates: 32°48′34″N 50°58′17″E
- Country: Iran
- Province: Isfahan
- County: Tiran and Karvan
- District: Karvan
- Rural District: Karvan-e Sofla

Population (2016)
  - Total: 1,491
- Time zone: UTC+3:30 (IRST)

Afjan (Persian: افجان) (Note: Also romanized as Āfjān and Afjān; also known as Āfchūn, Afshūn, and Apihūn) is a village in, and the capital of, Karvan-e Sofla Rural District (Note: Formerly Karvan-e Vosta Rural District) in Karvan District of Tiran and Karvan County, Isfahan province, Iran.

== Demographics ==
=== Population ===
At the time of the 2006 National Census, the village's population was 1,572 in 407 households. The following census in 2011 counted 1,530 people in 488 households. The 2016 census measured the population of the village as 1,491 people in 483 households.
