= Aliabad-e Karvan =

Village in Isfahan province, Iran

Aliabad-e Karvan Persian: علي ابادكرون
- Village
- Location within Iran
- Coordinates: 32°49′34″N 50°55′04″E
- Country: Iran
- Province: Isfahan
- County: Tiran and Karvan
- District: Karvan
- Rural District: Karvan-e Sofla

Population (2016)
  - Total: 584
- Time zone: UTC+3:30 (IRST)

Aliabad-e Karvan (Persian: علي ابادكرون) (Note: Also romanized as ‘Alīābād-e Karvan and ‘Alīābād Karown; also known as ‘Alīābād and Ali Abad Karon) is a village in Karvan-e Sofla Rural District (Note: Formerly Karvan-e Vosta Rural District) of Karvan District in Tiran and Karvan County, Isfahan province, Iran.

== Demographics ==
=== Population ===
At the time of the 2006 National Census, the village's population was 635 in 210 households. The following census in 2011 counted 614 people in 214 households. The 2016 census measured the population of the village as 584 people in 208 households.
