= Darreh Bid, Tiran and Karvan =

Village in Isfahan province, Iran

Darreh Bid Persian: دره بيد
- Village
- Location within Iran
- Coordinates: 32°57′53″N 50°44′39″E
- Country: Iran
- Province: Isfahan
- County: Tiran and Karvan
- District: Karvan
- Rural District: Karvan-e Olya

Population (2016)
  - Total: 1,312
- Time zone: UTC+3:30 (IRST)

Darreh Bid (Persian: دره بيد) (Note: Also romanized as Darreh Bīd and Darreh-ye Bīd; also known as Damābīd, Darābīd, Darre Bīd, and Darreh Abīd) is a village in Karvan-e Olya Rural District of Karvan District in Tiran and Karvan County, Isfahan province, Iran.

== Demographics ==
=== Population ===
At the time of the 2006 National Census, the village's population was 1,266 in 323 households. The following census in 2011 counted 1,257 people in 351 households. The 2016 census measured the population of the village as 1,312 people in 378 households.
