= Qaleh-ye Nazer =

Village in Isfahan province, Iran

Qaleh-ye Nazer Persian: قلعه ناظر
- Village
- Location within Iran
- Coordinates: 32°53′03″N 50°49′04″E
- Country: Iran
- Province: Isfahan
- County: Tiran and Karvan
- District: Karvan
- Rural District: Karvan-e Olya

Population (2016)
  - Total: 1,289
- Time zone: UTC+3:30 (IRST)

Qaleh-ye Nazer (Persian: قلعه ناظر) (Note: Also romanized as Qal‘eh Nazar, Qal‘eh Nāz̧er, and Qal‘eh-ye Nāz̧er) is a village in Karvan-e Olya Rural District of Karvan District in Tiran and Karvan County, Isfahan province, Iran.

== Demographics ==
=== Population ===
At the time of the 2006 National Census, the village's population was 1,241 in 315 households. The following census in 2011 counted 1,337 people in 383 households. The 2016 census measured the population of the village as 1,289 people in 403 households.
