= Abgarm, Tiran and Karvan =

Village in Isfahan province, Iran

Abgarm Persian: ابگرم
- Village
- Location within Iran
- Coordinates: 32°47′58″N 50°51′05″E
- Country: Iran
- Province: Isfahan
- County: Tiran and Karvan
- District: Karvan
- Rural District: Karvan-e Sofla

Population (2016)
  - Total: 587
- Time zone: UTC+3:30 (IRST)

Abgarm (Persian: ابگرم) (Note: Also romanized as Ābgarm; also known as Ābgarm-e Karvan) is a village in Karvan-e Sofla Rural District (Note: Formerly Karvan-e Vosta Rural District) of Karvan District in Tiran and Karvan County, Isfahan province, Iran.

== Demographics ==
=== Population ===
At the time of the 2006 National Census, the village's population was 705 in 198 households. The following census in 2011 counted 657 people in 218 households. The 2016 census measured the population of the village as 587 people in 196 households.
