= Qasemabad, Tiran and Karvan =

Village in Isfahan province, Iran

Qasemabad Persian: قاسم اباد
- Village
- Location within Iran
- Coordinates: 32°46′36″N 50°57′09″E
- Country: Iran
- Province: Isfahan
- County: Tiran and Karvan
- District: Karvan
- Rural District: Karvan-e Sofla

Population (2016)
  - Total: 1,010
- Time zone: UTC+3:30 (IRST)

Qasemabad (Persian: قاسم اباد) (Note: Also romanized as Qāsemābād; also known as Nasīmābād-e Bālā and Qāsimābād) is a village in Karvan-e Sofla Rural District (Note: Formerly Karvan-e Vosta Rural District) of Karvan District in Tiran and Karvan County, Isfahan province, Iran.

== Demographics ==
=== Population ===
At the time of the 2006 National Census, the village's population was 943 in 240 households. The following census in 2011 counted 977 people in 296 households. The 2016 census measured the population of the village as 1,010 people in 295 households.
