= Hasanabad-e Yek =

Hasanabad-e Yek (Persian: حسن آباديك) may refer to:

- Hasanabad-e Yek, Anbarabad
- Hasanabad-e Yek, Sirjan
- Hasanabad-e Yek, Saadatabad, Sirjan County
