= Nasimabad, Isfahan =

Village in Isfahan province, Iran

Nasimabad Persian: نسيم اباد
- Village
- Location within Iran
- Coordinates: 32°48′30″N 50°56′46″E
- Country: Iran
- Province: Isfahan
- County: Tiran and Karvan
- District: Karvan
- Rural District: Karvan-e Sofla

Population (2016)
  - Total: 878
- Time zone: UTC+3:30 (IRST)

Nasimabad (Persian: نسيم اباد) (Note: Also romanized as Nasīmābād) is a village in Karvan-e Sofla Rural District (Note: Formerly Karvan-e Vosta Rural District) of Karvan District in Tiran and Karvan County, Isfahan province, Iran.

== Demographics ==
=== Population ===
At the time of the 2006 National Census, the village's population was 819 in 215 households. The following census in 2011 counted 876 people in 255 households. The 2016 census measured the population of the village as 878 people in 257 households.
