= Kord-e Olya =

Village in Isfahan province, Iran

Kord-e Olya Persian: كردعليا
- Village
- Location within Iran
- Country: Iran
- Province: Isfahan
- County: Tiran and Karvan
- District: Karvan
- Rural District: Karvan-e Olya

Population (2016)
  - Total: 514
- Time zone: UTC+3:30 (IRST)

Kord-e Olya (Persian: كردعليا) (Note: Also romanized as Kord ‘Olyā and Kord-e ‘Olya; also known as Kard-e Bālā and Kurd) is a village in Karvan-e Olya Rural District of Karvan District in Tiran and Karvan County, Isfahan province, Iran.

== Demographics ==
=== Population ===
At the time of the 2006 National Census, the village's population was 739 in 215 households. The following census in 2011 counted 652 people in 226 households. The 2016 census measured the population of the village as 514 people in 178 households.
