= Budan, Iran =

Village in Isfahan province, Iran

Budan Persian: بودان
- Village
- Location within Iran
- Coordinates: 32°47′02″N 50°56′33″E
- Country: Iran
- Province: Isfahan
- County: Tiran and Karvan
- District: Karvan
- Rural District: Karvan-e Sofla

Population (2016)
  - Total: 1,488
- Time zone: UTC+3:30 (IRST)

Budan (Persian: بودان) (Note: Also romanized as Būdān; also known as Budun) is a village in Karvan-e Sofla Rural District (Note: Formerly Karvan-e Vosta Rural District) of Karvan District in Tiran and Karvan County, Isfahan province, Iran.

== Demographics ==
=== Population ===
At the time of the 2006 National Census, the village's population was 1,351 in 384 households. The following census in 2011 counted 1,472 people in 458 households. The 2016 census measured the population of the village as 1,488 people in 466 households.
