= Budan =

Budan may refer to:

- Budan, Iran
- Baba Budan, 17th century Sufi reputed to have introduced coffee to India
- François Budan de Boislaurent, French mathematician
- Igor Budan, Croatian footballer
- The Pinyin transliteration of the country Bhutan
