= Kord-e Sofla =

Village in Isfahan province, Iran

Kord-e Sofla Persian: كردسفلي
- Village
- Location within Iran
- Coordinates: 32°53′46″N 50°47′13″E
- Country: Iran
- Province: Isfahan
- County: Tiran and Karvan
- District: Karvan
- Rural District: Karvan-e Olya

Population (2016)
  - Total: 685
- Time zone: UTC+3:30 (IRST)

Kord-e Sofla (Persian: كردسفلي) (Note: Also romanized as Kord-e Soflá; also known as Kard-e Pā’īn, Kord-e Pā’īn, and Kurd) is a village in Karvan-e Olya Rural District of Karvan District in Tiran and Karvan County, Isfahan province, Iran.

== Demographics ==
=== Population ===
At the time of the 2006 National Census, the village's population was 784 in 199 households. The following census in 2011 counted 764 people in 228 households. The 2016 census measured the population of the village as 685 people in 229 households.
