= Qameshlu Castle =

Castle in Isfahan Province, Iran

- قلعه قمیشلو
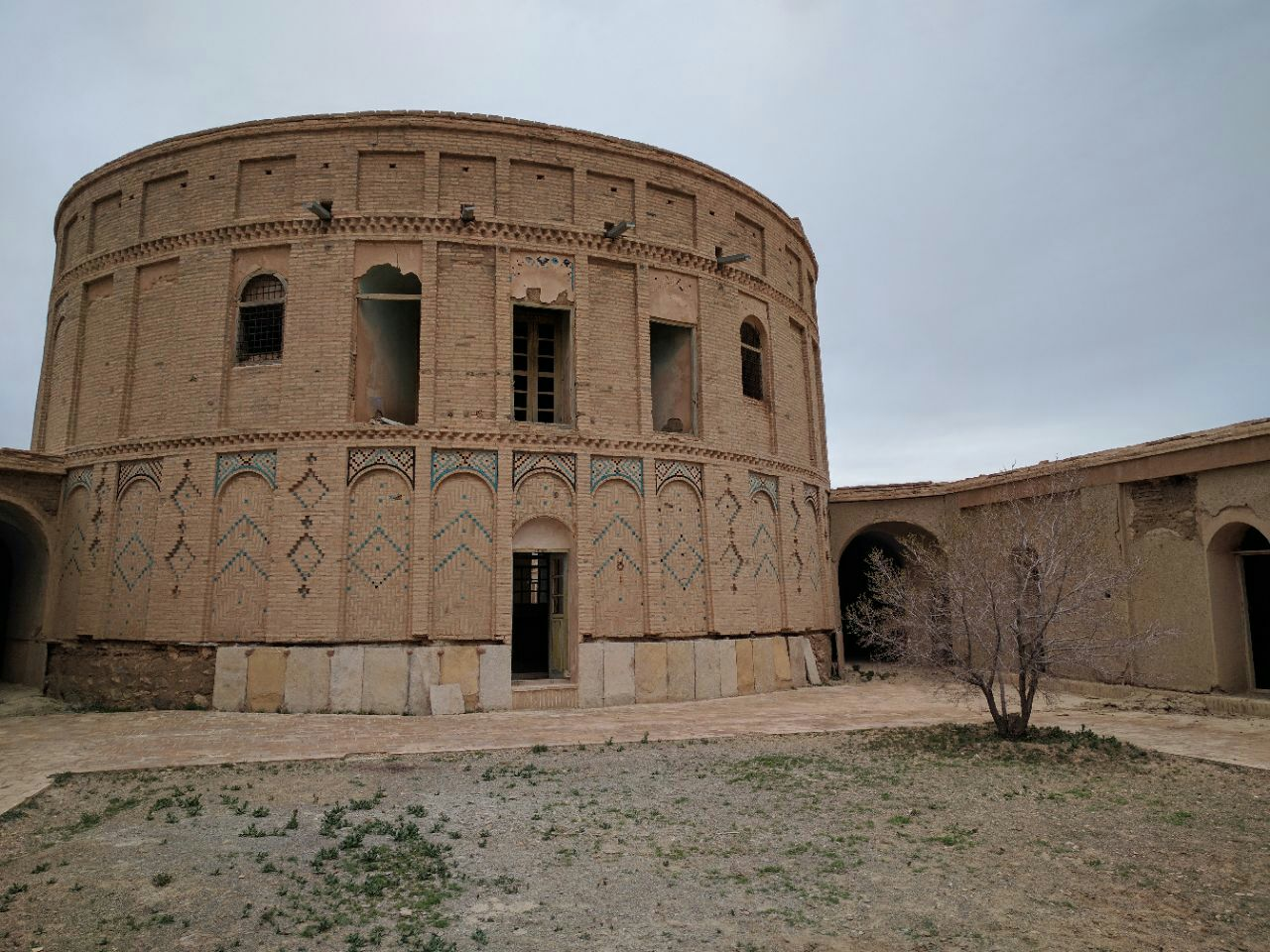

General information
- Type: Castle
- Location: Tiran and Karvan County, Iran

Qameshlu Castle (Persian: قلعه قمشلو) is a historical castle located in Tiran and Karvan County in Isfahan Province, The longevity of this fortress dates back to the Qajar dynasty.
