= Asgaran, Iran =

City in Isfahan province, Iran

Asgaran Persian: عسگران
- City
- Location within Iran
- Coordinates: 32°52′00″N 50°51′15″E
- Country: Iran
- Province: Isfahan
- County: Tiran and Karvan
- District: Karvan

Population (2016)
  - Total: 4,858
- Time zone: UTC+3:30 (IRST)

Asgaran (Persian: عسگران) (Note: Also romanized as ‘Asgarān; also known as ‘Asgarān Karvan and ‘Askarān) is a city in, and the capital of, Karvan District in Tiran and Karvan County, Isfahan province, Iran. It also serves as the administrative center for Karvan-e Olya Rural District.

== Demographics ==
=== Population ===
At the time of the 2006 National Census, the city's population was 4,037 in 1,109 households. The following census in 2011 counted 4,521 people in 1,353 households. The 2016 census measured the population of the city as 4,858 people in 1,462 households.
