= Karvan-e Sofla Rural District =

Rural district in Isfahan province, Iran

Karvan-e Sofla Rural District Persian: دهستان كرون سفلي
- Rural District
- Location within Iran
- Coordinates: 32°50′N 50°58′E
- Country: Iran
- Province: Isfahan
- County: Tiran and Karvan
- District: Karvan
- Established: 1987
- Capital: Afjan

Population (2016)
  - Total: 19,716
- Time zone: UTC+3:30 (IRST)

Karvan-e Sofla Rural District (Persian: دهستان كرون سفلي) (Note: Formerly Karvan-e Vosta Rural District (دهستان کرون وسطی)) is in Karvan District of Tiran and Karvan County, Isfahan province, Iran. Its capital is the village of Afjan.

== Demographics ==
=== Population ===
At the time of the 2006 National Census, the rural district's population was 18,066 in 4,876 households. There were 19,318 inhabitants in 5,761 households at the following census of 2011. The 2016 census measured the population of the rural district as 19,716 in 6,128 households. The most populous of its 25 villages was Mirabad, with 2,758 people.

=== Other villages in the rural district ===
- Abgarm
- Aliabad-e Karvan
- Budan
- Golab
- Hasanabad-e Olya
- Hasanabad-e Vosta
- Hoseynabad
- Mehdiabad
- Mobarakeh
- Mohammadiyeh
- Nasimabd
- Qahrizjan
- Qasemabad
- Suran
