= Karvan-e Olya Rural District =

Rural district in Isfahan province, Iran

Karvan-e Olya Rural District Persian: دهستان كرون عليا
- Rural District
- Location within Iran
- Coordinates: 32°56′N 50°46′E
- Country: Iran
- Province: Isfahan
- County: Tiran and Karvan
- District: Karvan
- Established: 1987
- Capital: Asgaran

Population (2016)
  - Total: 8,110
- Time zone: UTC+3:30 (IRST)

Karvan-e Olya Rural District (Persian: دهستان كرون عليا) is in Karvan District of Tiran and Karvan County, Isfahan province, Iran. It is administered from the city of Asgaran.

== Demographics ==
=== Population ===
At the time of the 2006 National Census, the rural district's population was 9,023 in 2,410 households. There were 8,809 inhabitants in 2,647 households at the following census of 2011. The 2016 census measured the population of the rural district as 8,110 in 2,557 households. The most populous of its 18 villages was Dowlatabad, with 1,772 people.

=== Other villages in the rural district ===
- Alvar
- Cheshmeh-ye Ahmad Reza
- Darreh Bid
- Dowtu
- Gonahran
- Kord-e Olya
- Kord-e Sofla
- Qaleh-ye Nazer
- Taqiabad
