= Hasanabad-e Vosta =

Village in Isfahan province, Iran

Hasanabad-e Vosta Persian: حسن ابادوسطي
- Village
- Location within Iran
- Coordinates: 32°47′23″N 50°57′16″E
- Country: Iran
- Province: Isfahan
- County: Tiran and Karvan
- District: Karvan
- Rural District: Karvan-e Sofla

Population (2016)
  - Total: 1,518
- Time zone: UTC+3:30 (IRST)

Hasanabad-e Vosta (Persian: حسن ابادوسطي) (Note: Also romanized as Ḩasanābād-e Vosţá; also known as Ḩasanābād-e Pā’īn) is a village in Karvan-e Sofla Rural District (Note: Formerly Karvan-e Vosta Rural District) of Karvan District in Tiran and Karvan County, Isfahan province, Iran.

== Demographics ==
=== Population ===
At the time of the 2006 National Census, the village's population was 1,421 in 326 households. The following census in 2011 counted 1,369 people in 397 households. The 2016 census measured the population of the village as 1,518 people in 462 households.
