= Hasanabad, Nasrovan =

Hasanabad حسن اباد
- Village
- Location within Iran
- Coordinates: 28°38′52″N 54°26′20″E
- Country: Iran
- Province: Fars
- County: Darab
- Bakhsh: Central
- Rural District: Nasrovan

Population (2006)
  - Total: 160
- Time zone: UTC+3:30 (IRST)
  - Summer (DST): UTC+4:30 (IRDT)

Hasanabad (Persian: حسن اباد, also Romanized as Ḩasanābād) is a village in Nasrovan Rural District, in the Central District of Darab County, Fars province, Iran. At the 2006 census, its population was 160, in 33 families.
