= Hasanabad, Avaj =

Hasanabad حسن اباد
- Village
- Location within Iran
- Coordinates: 35°51′54″N 48°57′25″E
- Country: Iran
- Province: Qazvin
- County: Avaj
- Bakhsh: Central
- Rural District: Hesar-e Valiyeasr

Population (2006)
  - Total: 80
- Time zone: UTC+3:30 (IRST)

Hasanabad (Persian: حسن اباد, also Romanized as Ḩasanābād) is a village in Hesar-e Valiyeasr Rural District, Central District, Avaj County, Qazvin Province, Iran. At the 2006 census, its population was 80, in 22 families.
