= Hasanabad-e Darreh Zereshk =

Hasanabad-e Darreh Zereshk حسن اباددره زرشك
- Village
- Location within Iran
- Coordinates: 31°32′42″N 53°50′05″E
- Country: Iran
- Province: Yazd
- County: Taft
- Bakhsh: Central
- Rural District: Dehshir

Population (2006)
  - Total: 48
- Time zone: UTC+3:30 (IRST)
  - Summer (DST): UTC+4:30 (IRDT)

Hasanabad-e Darreh Zereshk (Persian: حسن اباددره زرشك, also Romanized as Ḩasanābād-e Darreh Zereshk; also known as Ḩasanābād) is a village in Dehshir Rural District, in the Central District of Taft County, Yazd Province, Iran. At the 2006 census, its population was 48, in 19 families.
