= Hasanabad, Fasa =

Hasanabad حسن اباد
- Village
- Location within Iran
- Coordinates: 29°11′24″N 53°28′48″E
- Country: Iran
- Province: Fars
- County: Fasa
- Bakhsh: Central
- Rural District: Jangal

Population (2006)
  - Total: 44
- Time zone: UTC+3:30 (IRST)
  - Summer (DST): UTC+4:30 (IRDT)

Hasanabad (Persian: حسن اباد, also Romanized as Ḩasanābād) is a village in Jangal Rural District, in the Central District of Fasa County, Fars province, Iran. At the 2006 census, its population was 44, in 11 families.
