= Hasanabad, Dehpir =

Hasanabad حسن اباد
- Village
- Location within Iran
- Coordinates: 33°27′10″N 48°27′57″E
- Country: Iran
- Province: Lorestan
- County: Khorramabad
- Bakhsh: Central
- Rural District: Dehpir

Population (2006)
  - Total: 419
- Time zone: UTC+3:30 (IRST)
  - Summer (DST): UTC+4:30 (IRDT)

Hasanabad (Persian: حسن اباد, also Romanized as Ḩasanābād and Ḩesanābād) is a village in Dehpir Rural District, in the Central District of Khorramabad County, Lorestan Province, Iran. At the 2006 census, its population was 419, in 91 families.
