= Hasanabad, Shahr-e Babak =

Hasanabad حسن اباد
- Village
- Location within Iran
- Coordinates: 30°30′58″N 54°43′24″E
- Country: Iran
- Province: Kerman
- County: Shahr-e Babak
- Bakhsh: Dehaj
- Rural District: Khabar

Population (2006)
  - Total: 32
- Time zone: UTC+3:30 (IRST)
  - Summer (DST): UTC+4:30 (IRDT)

Hasanabad (Persian: حسن اباد, also Romanized as Ḩasanābād) is a village in Khabar Rural District, Dehaj District, Shahr-e Babak County, Kerman Province, Iran. At the 2006 census, its population was 32, in 4 families.
