= Hasanabad-e Shahzadeh =

Hasanabad-e Shahzadeh حسن ابادشاهزاده
- Village
- Location within Iran
- Coordinates: 29°32′10″N 55°34′33″E
- Country: Iran
- Province: Kerman
- County: Sirjan
- Bakhsh: Central
- Rural District: Mahmudabad-e Seyyed

Population (2006)
  - Total: 108
- Time zone: UTC+3:30 (IRST)
  - Summer (DST): UTC+4:30 (IRDT)

Hasanabad-e Shahzadeh (Persian: حسن ابادشاهزاده, also Romanized as Ḩasanābād-e Shāhzādeh; also known as Ḩasanābād) is a village in Mahmudabad-e Seyyed Rural District, in the Central District of Sirjan County, Kerman Province, Iran. At the 2006 census, its population was 108, in 26 families.
