= Qavamiyeh =

Qavamiyeh قواميه
- Village
- Location within Iran
- Coordinates: 33°18′51″N 57°34′25″E
- Country: Iran
- Province: South Khorasan
- County: Tabas
- Bakhsh: Deyhuk
- Rural District: Deyhuk

Population (2006)
  - Total: 30
- Time zone: UTC+3:30 (IRST)
  - Summer (DST): UTC+4:30 (IRDT)

Qavamiyeh (Persian: قواميه, also Romanized as Qavāmīyeh; also known as Ḩasanābād Qavām, Ḩoseynābād, and Husainābād) is a village in Deyhuk Rural District, Deyhuk District, Tabas County, South Khorasan Province, Iran. At the 2006 census, its population was 30, in 7 families.
