= Hasanabad-e Dastgerd =

Hasanabad-e Dastgerd حسن اباددستگرد
- Village
- Location within Iran
- Coordinates: 28°21′27″N 61°27′29″E
- Country: Iran
- Province: Sistan and Baluchestan
- County: Khash
- Bakhsh: Central
- Rural District: Poshtkuh

Population (2006)
  - Total: 23
- Time zone: UTC+3:30 (IRST)
  - Summer (DST): UTC+4:30 (IRDT)

Hasanabad-e Dastgerd (Persian: حسن اباددستگرد, also Romanized as Ḩasanābād-e Dastgerd; also known as Ḩoseynābād) is a village in Poshtkuh Rural District, in the Central District of Khash County, Sistan and Baluchestan Province, Iran. At the 2006 census, its population was 23, in 4 families.
