= Hasanabad-e Olya, Isfahan =

Village in Isfahan province, Iran

Hasanabad-e Olya Persian: حسن ابادعليا
- Village
- Location within Iran
- Coordinates: 32°49′06″N 50°51′30″E
- Country: Iran
- Province: Isfahan
- County: Tiran and Karvan
- District: Karvan
- Rural District: Karvan-e Sofla

Population (2016)
  - Total: 621
- Time zone: UTC+3:30 (IRST)

Hasanabad-e Olya (Persian: حسن ابادعليا) (Note: Also romanized as Ḩasanābād-e ‘Olyā; also known as Ḩasanābād and Ḩasanābād-e Bālā) is a village in Karvan-e Sofla Rural District (Note: Formerly Karvan-e Vosta Rural District) of Karvan District in Tiran and Karvan County, Isfahan province, Iran.

== Demographics ==
=== Population ===
At the time of the 2006 National Census, the village's population was 626 in 182 households. The following census in 2011 counted 645 people in 211 households. The 2016 census measured the population of the village as 621 people in 201 households.
