= Hasanabad-e Dabirnezam =

Hasanabad-e Dabirnezam حسن اباددبيرنظام
- Village
- Location within Iran
- Coordinates: 28°57′10″N 58°39′10″E
- Country: Iran
- Province: Kerman
- County: Narmashir
- Bakhsh: Central
- Rural District: Posht Rud

Population (2006)
  - Total: 150
- Time zone: UTC+3:30 (IRST)
  - Summer (DST): UTC+4:30 (IRDT)

Hasanabad-e Dabirnezam (Persian: حسن اباددبيرنظام, also Romanized as Ḩasanābād-e Dabīrneẓām) is a village in Posht Rud Rural District, in the Central District of Narmashir County, Kerman Province, Iran. At the 2006 census, its population was 150, in 32 families.
