= Hasanabad-e Abu ol Hasani =

Hasanabad-e Abu ol Hasani حسن ابادابوالحسني
- Village
- Location within Iran
- Coordinates: 29°18′22″N 51°58′49″E
- Country: Iran
- Province: Fars
- County: Kazerun
- Bakhsh: Jereh and Baladeh
- Rural District: Jereh

Population (2006)
  - Total: 610
- Time zone: UTC+3:30 (IRST)
  - Summer (DST): UTC+4:30 (IRDT)

Hasanabad-e Abu ol Hasani (Persian: حسن ابادابوالحسني, also Romanized as Ḩasanābād-e Abū ol Ḩasanī and Ḩasanābād-e Abowlḩasanī; also known as Abowl Ḩasanī and Abū ol Ḩasanī) is a village in Jereh Rural District, Jereh and Baladeh District, Kazerun County, Fars province, Iran. At the 2006 census, its population was 610, in 133 families.
