= Hasanabad-e Gorji =

Hasanabad-e Gorji حسن ابادگرجي
- Village
- Location within Iran
- Coordinates: 36°29′48″N 59°25′50″E
- Country: Iran
- Province: Razavi Khorasan
- County: Mashhad
- Bakhsh: Central
- Rural District: Miyan Velayat

Population (2006)
  - Total: 181
- Time zone: UTC+3:30 (IRST)
  - Summer (DST): UTC+4:30 (IRDT)

Hasanabad-e Gorji (Persian: حسن ابادگرجي, also Romanized as Ḩasanābād-e Gorjī; also known as Ḩasanābād-e Shāhrāh) is a village in Miyan Velayat Rural District, in the Central District of Mashhad County, Razavi Khorasan Province, Iran. At the 2006 census, its population was 181, in 43 families.
