= Hasanabad, Qatruyeh =

Hasanabad حسن‌آباد
- Village
- Location within Iran
- Coordinates: 28°56′32″N 54°54′16″E
- Country: Iran
- Province: Fars
- County: Neyriz
- Bakhsh: Qatruyeh
- Rural District: Rizab

Population (2006)
  - Total: 15
- Time zone: UTC+3:30 (IRST)
  - Summer (DST): UTC+4:30 (IRDT)

Hasanabad (Persian: حسن اباد, also Romanized as Ḩasanābād-e Bam Fūrd; also known as Ḩasanābād) is a village in Rizab Rural District, Qatruyeh District, Neyriz County, Fars province, Iran. At the 2006 census, its population was 15, in 5 families.
