= Hasanabad, Qazvin =

Neighborhood in Qazvin province, Iran

Hasanabad Persian: حسن اباد
- Neighborhood
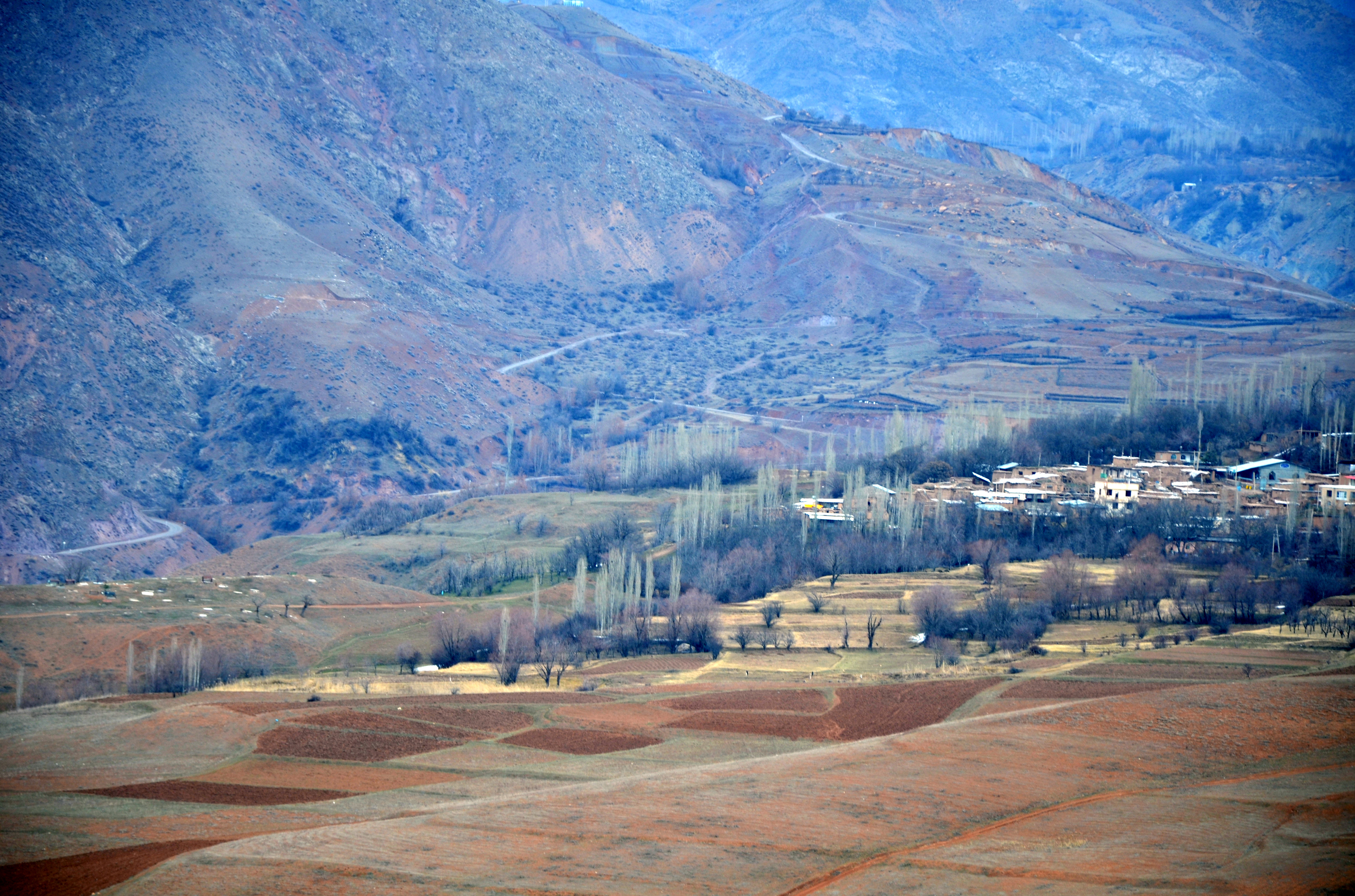
- The neighborhood of Hasanabad in the city of Qazvin

- Location within Iran
- Coordinates: 36°17′48″N 50°04′14″E
- Country: Iran
- Province: Qazvin
- County: Qazvin
- District: Central
- City: Qazvin

Population (2011)
  - Total: 888
- Time zone: UTC+3:30 (IRST)

Hasanabad (Persian: حسن اباد) (Note: Also romanized as Ḩasanābād) is a neighborhood in the city of Qazvin in the Central District of Qazvin County, Qazvin province, Iran.

== Demographics ==
=== Population ===
At the time of the 2006 National Census, Hasanabad's population was 654 in 164 households, when it was a village in Eqbal-e Sharqi Rural District. The following census in 2011 counted 888 people in 258 households. The village was annexed to the city of Qazvin in 2015.
