= Hasanabad-e Gilavand =

Hasanabad-e Gilavand حسن ابادگيلاوند
- Village
- Location within Iran
- Coordinates: 33°22′22″N 48°35′58″E
- Country: Iran
- Province: Lorestan
- County: Khorramabad
- Bakhsh: Central
- Rural District: Azna

Population (2006)
  - Total: 39
- Time zone: UTC+3:30 (IRST)
  - Summer (DST): UTC+4:30 (IRDT)

Hasanabad-e Gilavand (Persian: حسن ابادگيلاوند, also Romanized as Ḩasanābād-e Gīlāvand; also known as Ḩasanābād) is a village in Azna Rural District, in the Central District of Khorramabad County, Lorestan Province, Iran. At the 2006 census, its population was 39, in 8 families.
