= Hashemabad, Fahraj =

Hashemabad هاشم اباد
- Village
- Location within Iran
- Coordinates: 28°49′51″N 58°52′23″E
- Country: Iran
- Province: Kerman
- County: Fahraj
- Bakhsh: Central
- Rural District: Borj-e Akram

Population (2006)
  - Total: 296
- Time zone: UTC+3:30 (IRST)
  - Summer (DST): UTC+4:30 (IRDT)

Hashemabad (Persian: هاشم اباد, also Romanized as Hāshemābād; also known as Ḩasanābād) is a village in Borj-e Akram Rural District, in the Central District of Fahraj County, Kerman Province, Iran. At the 2006 census, its population was 296, in 79 families.
