= Hasanabad, Rudbal =

Hasanabad حسن اباد
- Village
- Location within Iran
- Coordinates: 29°54′00″N 52°47′00″E
- Country: Iran
- Province: Fars
- County: Marvdasht
- Bakhsh: Central
- Rural District: Rudbal

Population (2006)
  - Total: 81
- Time zone: UTC+3:30 (IRST)
  - Summer (DST): UTC+4:30 (IRDT)

Hasanabad (Persian: حسن اباد, also Romanized as Ḩasanābād) is a village in Rudbal Rural District, in the Central District of Marvdasht County, Fars province, Iran. At the 2006 census, its population was 81, in 22 families.
