= Ziarat-e Hasanabad =

Ziarat-e Hasanabad زيارت حسن اباد
- Village
- Location within Iran
- Coordinates: 26°39′01″N 57°04′50″E
- Country: Iran
- Province: Hormozgan
- County: Minab
- Bakhsh: Byaban
- Rural District: Sirik

Population (2006)
  - Total: 229
- Time zone: UTC+3:30 (IRST)
  - Summer (DST): UTC+4:30 (IRDT)

Ziarat-e Hasanabad (Persian: زيارت حسن اباد, also Romanized as Zīārat-e Ḩasanābād; also known as Ḩasanābād-e Zīārat, Zeyārat, Zeyāreh, Zīārat, Zīārat-e Kīlā, Zīārat Kalleh, Ziyārat Kalla, and Ziyārat Kalleh) is a village in Sirik Rural District, Byaban District, Minab County, Hormozgan Province, Iran. At the 2006 census, its population was 229, in 34 families.
