= Hoseynabad-e Serkan =

Hoseynabad-e Serkan حسين ابادسركان
- Village
- Location within Iran
- Coordinates: 34°17′50″N 48°05′36″E
- Country: Iran
- Province: Hamadan
- County: Nahavand
- Bakhsh: Khezel
- Rural District: Solgi

Population (2006)
  - Total: 108
- Time zone: UTC+3:30 (IRST)
  - Summer (DST): UTC+4:30 (IRDT)

Hoseynabad-e Serkan (Persian: حسين ابادسركان, also Romanized as Ḩoseynābād-e Serkān; also known as Hasanābād, Ḩoseynābād, and Ḩoseynābād Mehrkān) is a village in Solgi Rural District, Khezel District, Nahavand County, Hamadan Province, Iran. At the 2006 census, its population was 108, in 25 families.
