= Hoseynabad-e Qaleh Sorkh =

Village in Razavi Khorasan, Iran

Hoseynabad-e Qaleh Sorkh حسين ابادقلعه سرخ
- Village
- Location within Iran
- Coordinates: 35°50′40″N 59°48′15″E
- Country: Iran
- Province: Razavi Khorasan
- County: Fariman
- Bakhsh: Central
- Rural District: Fariman

Population (2006)
  - Total: 171
- Time zone: UTC+3:30 (IRST)
  - Summer (DST): UTC+4:30 (IRDT)

Hoseynabad-e Qaleh Sorkh (Persian: حسين ابادقلعه سرخ, also Romanized as Ḩoseynābād-e Qal‘eh Sorkh; also known as Ḩoseynābād and Hasanābād) is a village in Fariman Rural District, in the Central District of Fariman County, Razavi Khorasan Province, Iran. At the 2006 census, its population was 171, in 46 families.
