= Hasanabad-e Tang Sorkh =

Hasanabad-e Tang Sorkh حسن ابادتنگ سرخ
- Village
- Location within Iran
- Coordinates: 30°29′10″N 51°44′39″E
- Country: Iran
- Province: Kohgiluyeh and Boyer-Ahmad
- County: Boyer-Ahmad
- Bakhsh: Central
- Rural District: Sarrud-e Jonubi

Population (2006)
  - Total: 31
- Time zone: UTC+3:30 (IRST)
  - Summer (DST): UTC+4:30 (IRDT)

Hasanabad-e Tang Sorkh (Persian: حسن ابادتنگ سرخ, also Romanized as Ḩasanābād-e Tang Sorkh; also known as Ḩasanābād) is a village in Sarrud-e Jonubi Rural District, in the Central District of Boyer-Ahmad County, Kohgiluyeh and Boyer-Ahmad Province, Iran. At the 2006 census, its population was 31, in 8 families.
