= Hosenabad =

Hosenabad (Persian: حصن اباد) may refer to:

- Hosenabad-e Bala
- Hosenabad-e Pain
