= Hasanabad-e Jahanabad =

Hasanabad-e Jahanabad حسن ابادجهان اباد
- Village
- Interactive map of Hasanabad-e Jahanabad
- Country: Iran
- Province: Kerman
- County: Rigan
- Bakhsh: Central
- Rural District: Rigan

Population (2006)
  - Total: 53
- Time zone: UTC+3:30 (IRST)
  - Summer (DST): UTC+4:30 (IRDT)

Hasanabad-e Jahanabad (Persian: حسن ابادجهان اباد, also Romanized as Ḩasanābād-e Jahānābād) is a village in Rigan Rural District, in the Central District of Rigan County, Kerman Province, Iran. At the 2006 census, its population was 53, in 12 families.
