= Chah Talekh, North Khorasan =

Chah Talekh چاه تلخ
- Village
- Location within Iran
- Coordinates: 36°50′21″N 57°36′43″E
- Country: Iran
- Province: North Khorasan
- County: Esfarayen
- Bakhsh: Central
- Rural District: Azari

Population (2006)
  - Total: 36
- Time zone: UTC+3:30 (IRST)
  - Summer (DST): UTC+4:30 (IRDT)

Chah Talekh (Persian: چاه تلخ, also Romanized as Chāh Talekh; also known as Ḩasanābād and Chahtālkh) is a village in Azari Rural District, in the Central District of Esfarayen County, North Khorasan Province, Iran. At the 2006 census, its population was 36, in 9 families.
