= Hasanabad, Darmian =

Hasanabad حسن اباد
- Village
- Location within Iran
- Coordinates: 32°45′25″N 60°14′47″E
- Country: Iran
- Province: South Khorasan
- County: Darmian
- Bakhsh: Central
- Rural District: Darmian

Population (2006)
  - Total: 20
- Time zone: UTC+3:30 (IRST)
  - Summer (DST): UTC+4:30 (IRDT)

Hasanabad (Persian: حسن اباد, also Romanized as Ḩasanābād) is a village in Darmian Rural District, in the Central District of Darmian County, South Khorasan Province, Iran. At the 2006 census, its population was 20, in 5 families.
