= Hasanabad-e Padam =

Hasanabad-e Padam حسن ابادپدم
- Village
- Location within Iran
- Coordinates: 28°46′12″N 54°19′12″E
- Country: Iran
- Province: Fars
- County: Darab
- Bakhsh: Central
- Rural District: Nasrovan

Population (2006)
  - Total: 213
- Time zone: UTC+3:30 (IRST)
  - Summer (DST): UTC+4:30 (IRDT)

Hasanabad-e Padam (Persian: حسن ابادپدم, also Romanized as Ḩasanābād-e Padam; also known as Ḩasanābād) is a village in Nasrovan Rural District, in the Central District of Darab County, Fars province, Iran. At the 2006 census, its population was 213, in 46 families.
