= Hasan Bolbol =

Village in Razavi Khorasan, Iran

Hasan Bolbol حسن بلبل
- Village
- Location within Iran
- Coordinates: 35°31′37″N 60°00′07″E
- Country: Iran
- Province: Razavi Khorasan
- County: Fariman
- Bakhsh: Qalandarabad
- Rural District: Qalandarabad

Population (2006)
  - Total: 80
- Time zone: UTC+3:30 (IRST)
  - Summer (DST): UTC+4:30 (IRDT)

Hasan Bolbol (Persian: حسن بلبل, also Romanized as Ḩasan Bolbol; also known as Ḩasanābād) is a village in Qalandarabad Rural District, Qalandarabad District, Fariman County, Razavi Khorasan Province, Iran. At the 2006 census, its population was 80, in 20 families.
