= Hasanabad, Amirabad =

Village in Semnan province, Iran

Hasanabad Persian: حسن آباد
- Village
- Location within Iran
- Coordinates: 35°55′05″N 54°19′43″E
- Country: Iran
- Province: Semnan
- County: Damghan
- District: Amirabad
- Rural District: Qohab-e Rastaq

Population (2016)
  - Total: 1,067
- Time zone: UTC+3:30 (IRST)

Hasanabad (Persian: حسن آباد) (Note: Also romanized as Ḩasanābād) is a village in Qohab-e Rastaq Rural District of Amirabad District in Damghan County, Semnan province, Iran.

== Demographics ==
=== Population ===
At the time of the 2006 National Census, the village's population was 1,095 in 280 households. The following census in 2011 counted 1,002 people in 273 households. The 2016 census measured the population of the village as 1,067 people in 322 households, the most populous in its rural district.
