= Hasanabad-e Mehrab Jan =

Hasanabad-e Mehrab Jan حسن ابادمهرابجان
- Village
- Location within Iran
- Coordinates: 29°36′30″N 55°27′54″E
- Country: Iran
- Province: Kerman
- County: Sirjan
- Bakhsh: Central
- Rural District: Zeydabad

Population (2006)
  - Total: 44
- Time zone: UTC+3:30 (IRST)
  - Summer (DST): UTC+4:30 (IRDT)

Hasanabad-e Mehrab Jan (Persian: حسن ابادمهرابجان, also Romanized as Ḩasanābād-e Mehrāb Jān; also known as Ḩasanābād and Ḩasanābād-e Mehrāb Khān) is a village in Zeydabad Rural District, in the Central District of Sirjan County, Kerman Province, Iran. At the 2006 census, its population was 44, in 10 families.
