= Hasanabad-e Navvab =

Hasanabad-e Navvab حسن ابادنواب
- Village
- Location within Iran
- Coordinates: 30°32′51″N 55°40′57″E
- Country: Iran
- Province: Kerman
- County: Rafsanjan
- Bakhsh: Koshkuiyeh
- Rural District: Koshkuiyeh

Population (2006)
  - Total: 241
- Time zone: UTC+3:30 (IRST)
  - Summer (DST): UTC+4:30 (IRDT)

Hasanabad-e Navvab (Persian: حسن ابادنواب, also Romanized as Ḩasanābād-e Navvāb) is a village in Koshkuiyeh Rural District, Koshkuiyeh District, Rafsanjan County, Kerman Province, Iran. At the 2006 census, its population was 241, in 55 families.
