= Hasanabad, Qaen =

Hasanabad حسن اباد
- Village
- Location within Iran
- Coordinates: 33°16′23″N 59°18′43″E
- Country: Iran
- Province: South Khorasan
- County: Qaen
- Bakhsh: Sedeh
- Rural District: Sedeh

Population (2006)
  - Total: 110
- Time zone: UTC+3:30 (IRST)
  - Summer (DST): UTC+4:30 (IRDT)

Hasanabad (Persian: حسن اباد, also Romanized as Ḩasanābād) is a village in Sedeh Rural District, Sedeh District, Qaen County, South Khorasan Province, Iran. At the 2006 census, its population was 110, in 39 families.
