= Hasanabad-e Tavakkoli =

Hasanabad-e Tavakkoli حسن ابادتوكلي
- Village
- Location within Iran
- Coordinates: 32°51′40″N 52°59′36″E
- Country: Iran
- Province: Isfahan
- County: Nain
- Bakhsh: Central
- Rural District: Lay Siyah

Population (2006)
  - Total: 10
- Time zone: UTC+3:30 (IRST)
  - Summer (DST): UTC+4:30 (IRDT)

Hasanabad-e Tavakkoli (Persian: حسن ابادتوكلي, also Romanized as Ḩasanābād-e Tavakkolī; also known as Ḩasanābād and Ḩasanābād-e Tavakkol) is a village in Lay Siyah Rural District, in the Central District of Nain County, Isfahan Province, Iran. At the 2006 census, its population was 10, in 5 families.
