= Hasanabad-e Zandi =

Hasanabad-e Zandi حسن ابادزندي
- Village
- Location within Iran
- Coordinates: 30°34′32″N 55°39′08″E
- Country: Iran
- Province: Kerman
- County: Rafsanjan
- Bakhsh: Koshkuiyeh
- Rural District: Koshkuiyeh

Population (2006)
  - Total: 313
- Time zone: UTC+3:30 (IRST)
  - Summer (DST): UTC+4:30 (IRDT)

Hasanabad-e Zandi (Persian: حسن ابادزندي, also Romanized as Ḩasanābād-e Zandī; also known as Ḩasanābād) is a village in Koshkuiyeh Rural District, Koshkuiyeh District, Rafsanjan County, Kerman Province, Iran. At the 2006 census, its population was 313, in 69 families.
