= Hasanabad-e Govijeh =

Hasanabad-e Govijeh حسن ابادگويجه
- Village
- Location within Iran
- Coordinates: 35°00′35″N 47°25′57″E
- Country: Iran
- Province: Kermanshah
- County: Sonqor
- Bakhsh: Kolyai
- Rural District: Agahan

Population (2006)
  - Total: 56
- Time zone: UTC+3:30 (IRST)
  - Summer (DST): UTC+4:30 (IRDT)

Hasanabad-e Govijeh (Persian: حسن ابادگويجه, also Romanized as Ḩasanābād-e Govījeh; also known as Ḩasanābād and Ḩasanābād-e Amjadī) is a village in Agahan Rural District, Kolyai District, Sonqor County, Kermanshah Province, Iran. At the 2006 census, its population was 56, in 13 families.
