= Hasanabad, Masjed Soleyman =

Hasanabad حسن اباد
- Village
- Location within Iran
- Coordinates: 32°03′39″N 49°15′43″E
- Country: Iran
- Province: Khuzestan
- County: Masjed Soleyman
- Bakhsh: Central
- Rural District: Jahangiri

Population (2006)
  - Total: 57
- Time zone: UTC+3:30 (IRST)
  - Summer (DST): UTC+4:30 (IRDT)

Hasanabad (Persian: حسن اباد, Ḩasanābād) is a village in the Jahangiri Rural District in the Central District of Masjed Soleyman County, Khuzestan Province, Iran. As of the 2006 census, its population was 57, with 15 families.
