= Hoseynabad-e Ab Shur =

Hoseynabad-e Ab Shur حسين ابادابشور
- Village
- Location within Iran
- Coordinates: 28°41′10″N 58°57′40″E
- Country: Iran
- Province: Kerman
- County: Rigan
- Bakhsh: Gonbaki
- Rural District: Gonbaki

Population (2006)
  - Total: 528
- Time zone: UTC+3:30 (IRST)
  - Summer (DST): UTC+4:30 (IRDT)

Hoseynabad-e Ab Shur (Persian: حسين ابادابشور, also Romanized as Ḩoseynābād-e Āb Shūr and Hosein Abad Abshoor; also known as Ḩassanābād-e Āb Shūr) is a village in Gonbaki Rural District, Gonbaki District, Rigan County, Kerman Province, Iran. At the 2006 census, its population was 528, in 78 families.
