= Hasanabad-e Tabarqu =

Hasanabad-e Tabarqu حسن ابادتبرقو
- Village
- Location within Iran
- Coordinates: 30°36′24″N 51°29′17″E
- Country: Iran
- Province: Kohgiluyeh and Boyer-Ahmad
- County: Boyer-Ahmad
- Bakhsh: Central
- Rural District: Dasht-e Rum

Population (2006)
  - Total: 133
- Time zone: UTC+3:30 (IRST)
  - Summer (DST): UTC+4:30 (IRDT)

Hasanabad-e Tabarqu (Persian: حسن ابادتبرقو, also Romanized as Ḩasanābād-e Tabarqū; also known as Ḩasanābād) is a village in Dasht-e Rum Rural District, in the Central District of Boyer-Ahmad County, Kohgiluyeh and Boyer-Ahmad Province, Iran. At the 2006 census, its population was 133, in 28 families.
