= Hasanabad-e Abu ol Fath =

Hasanabad-e Abu ol Fath حسن‌آبادبوالفتح
- village
- Location within Iran
- Coordinates: 29°52′09″N 50°26′14″E
- Country: Iran
- Province: Bushehr
- County: Deylam
- Bakhsh: Imam Hassan
- Rural District: Liravi-ye Miyani

Population (2006)
  - Total: 77
- Time zone: UTC+3:30 (IRST)
  - Summer (DST): UTC+4:30 (IRDT)

Hasanabad-e Abu ol Fath (Persian: حسن‌آبادبوالفتح, also Romanized as Ḩasanābād-e Abū ol Fatḩ and Ḩasanābād Abū ol Fatḩ; also known as Bū ol Fatḩ-e Kūchek and Ḩasanābād) is a village in Liravi-ye Miyani Rural District, Imam Hassan District, Deylam County, Bushehr Province, Iran. At the 2006 census, its population was 77, in 20 families.
