= Hasanabad, Bakhtajerd =

Hasanabad حسن اباد
- Village
- Location within Iran
- Coordinates: 28°46′21″N 54°25′57″E
- Country: Iran
- Province: Fars
- County: Darab
- Bakhsh: Central
- Rural District: Bakhtajerd

Population (2006)
  - Total: 30
- Time zone: UTC+3:30 (IRST)
  - Summer (DST): UTC+4:30 (IRDT)

Hasanabad (Persian: حسن اباد, also Romanized as Ḩasanābād; also known as Ḩasanābād-e Chāhreh Sīyāh) is a village in Bakhtajerd Rural District, in the Central District of Darab County, Fars province, Iran. At the 2006 census, its population was 30, in 8 families.
