= Hasanabad-e Mir Hashemi =

Hasanabad-e Mir Hashemi حسن ابادميرهاشمي
- Village
- Location within Iran
- Coordinates: 35°34′17″N 50°42′33″E
- Country: Iran
- Province: Tehran
- County: Malard
- Bakhsh: Central
- Rural District: Akhtarabad

Population (2006)
  - Total: 18
- Time zone: UTC+3:30 (IRST)
  - Summer (DST): UTC+4:30 (IRDT)

Hasanabad-e Mir Hashemi (Persian: حسن ابادميرهاشمي, also Romanized as Ḩasanābād-e Mīr Hāshemī; also known as Ḩasanābād) is a village in Akhtarabad Rural District, in the Central District of Malard County, Tehran Province, Iran. At the 2006 census, its population was 18, in 4 families.
