= Hasanabad, Larestan =

Hasanabad حسن اباد
- Village
- Location within Iran
- Coordinates: 28°10′12″N 53°57′56″E
- Country: Iran
- Province: Fars
- County: Larestan
- Bakhsh: Banaruiyeh
- Rural District: Deh Fish

Population (2006)
  - Total: 107
- Time zone: UTC+3:30 (IRST)
  - Summer (DST): UTC+4:30 (IRDT)

Hasanabad (Persian: حسن اباد, also Romanized as Ḩasanābād; also known as Ḩasanābād-e Jūyom) is a village in Deh Fish Rural District, Banaruiyeh District, Larestan County, Fars province, Iran. At the 2006 census, its population was 107, in 18 families.
