= Hasanabad-e Nazarian =

Hasanabad-e Nazarian حسن ابادنظريان
- Village
- Location within Iran
- Coordinates: 28°21′19″N 57°43′04″E
- Country: Iran
- Province: Kerman
- County: Anbarabad
- Bakhsh: Esmaili
- Rural District: Hoseynabad

Population (2006)
  - Total: 154
- Time zone: UTC+3:30 (IRST)
  - Summer (DST): UTC+4:30 (IRDT)

Hasanabad-e Nazarian (Persian: حسن ابادنظريان, also Romanized as Ḩasanābād-e Naz̧arīān and Ḩasanābād-e Naz̧areyān; also known as Ḩasanābād) is a village in Hoseynabad Rural District, Esmaili District, Anbarabad County, Kerman Province, Iran. At the 2006 census, its population was 154, in 32 families.
