= Hasanabad-e Kohneh, Isfahan =

Hasanabad-e Kohneh حسن ابادكهنه
- Village
- Location within Iran
- Coordinates: 32°38′39″N 50°57′19″E
- Country: Iran
- Province: Isfahan
- County: Tiran and Karvan
- Bakhsh: Central
- Rural District: Rezvaniyeh

Population (2006)
  - Total: 26
- Time zone: UTC+3:30 (IRST)
  - Summer (DST): UTC+4:30 (IRDT)

Hasanabad-e Kohneh (Persian: حسن ابادكهنه, also Romanized as Ḩasanābād-e Kohneh; also known as Ḩasanābād) is a village in Rezvaniyeh Rural District, in the Central District of Tiran and Karvan County, Isfahan Province, Iran. At the 2006 census, its population was 26, in 12 families.
