= Hasanabad-e Qashoq =

Hasanabad-e Qashoq حسن آباد قاشق
- Village
- Location within Iran
- Coordinates: 36°23′12″N 46°32′50″E
- Country: Iran
- Province: Kurdistan
- County: Saqqez
- Bakhsh: Ziviyeh
- Rural District: Gol Tappeh

Population (2006)
  - Total: 71
- Time zone: UTC+3:30 (IRST)
  - Summer (DST): UTC+4:30 (IRDT)

Hasanabad-e Qashoq (Persian: حسن آباد قاشق, also Romanized as Ḩasanābād-e Qāshoq; also known as Ḩasanābād) is a village in Gol Tappeh Rural District, Ziviyeh District, Saqqez County, Kurdistan Province, Iran. At the 2006 census, its population was 71, in 14 families. The village is populated by Kurds.
