= Hasanabad-e Ab Konar =

Hasanabad-e Ab Konar حسن اباداب كنار
- Village
- Location within Iran
- Coordinates: 29°27′36″N 51°46′11″E
- Country: Iran
- Province: Fars
- County: Kazerun
- Bakhsh: Central
- Rural District: Balyan

Population (2006)
  - Total: 139
- Time zone: UTC+3:30 (IRST)
  - Summer (DST): UTC+4:30 (IRDT)

Hasanabad-e Ab Konar (Persian: حسن اباداب كنار, also Romanized as Ḩasanābād-e Āb Konār; also known as Ḩasanābād) is a village in Balyan Rural District, in the Central District of Kazerun County, Fars province, Iran. At the 2006 census, its population was 139, in 31 families.
