= Hasanabad-e Mian =

Hasanabad-e Mian حسن ابادميان
- Village
- Location within Iran
- Coordinates: 32°41′45″N 59°20′04″E
- Country: Iran
- Province: South Khorasan
- County: Birjand
- Bakhsh: Central
- Rural District: Baqeran

Population (2006)
  - Total: 164
- Time zone: UTC+3:30 (IRST)
  - Summer (DST): UTC+4:30 (IRDT)

Hasanabad-e Mian (Persian: حسن ابادميان, also Romanized as Ḩasanābād-e Mīān) is a village in Baqeran Rural District, in the Central District of Birjand County, South Khorasan Province, Iran. At the 2006 census, its population was 164, in 65 families.
