= Hasanabad-e Deh Koreh =

Hasanabad-e Deh Koreh حسن ابادده كره
- Village
- Location within Iran
- Coordinates: 28°56′35″N 58°42′36″E
- Country: Iran
- Province: Kerman
- County: Narmashir
- Bakhsh: Central
- Rural District: Azizabad

Population (2006)
  - Total: 1,044
- Time zone: UTC+3:30 (IRST)
  - Summer (DST): UTC+4:30 (IRDT)

Hasanabad-e Deh Koreh (Persian: حسن ابادده كره, also Romanized as Ḩasanābād-e Deh Koreh; also known as Hasanābād and Ḩasanābād-e Deh Kūreh) is a village in Azizabad Rural District, in the Central District of Narmashir County, Kerman Province, Iran. At the 2006 census, its population was 1,044, in 235 families.
