= Hasanabad-e Salar =

Hasanabad-e Salar حسن ابادسالار
- Village
- Location within Iran
- Coordinates: 36°07′37″N 58°30′45″E
- Country: Iran
- Province: Razavi Khorasan
- County: Firuzeh
- Bakhsh: Central
- Rural District: Takht-e Jolgeh

Population (2006)
  - Total: 406
- Time zone: UTC+3:30 (IRST)
  - Summer (DST): UTC+4:30 (IRDT)

Hasanabad-e Salar (Persian: حسن ابادسالار, also Romanized as Ḩasanābād-e Sālār; also known as Ḩasanābād) is a village in Takht-e Jolgeh Rural District, in the Central District of Firuzeh County, Razavi Khorasan Province, Iran. At the 2006 census, its population was 406, in 94 families.
