= Hasanabad, Abravan =

Hasanabad حسن اباد
- Village
- Location within Iran
- Coordinates: 36°05′00″N 60°01′00″E
- Country: Iran
- Province: Razavi Khorasan
- County: Mashhad
- Bakhsh: Razaviyeh
- Rural District: Abravan

Population (2006)
  - Total: 269
- Time zone: UTC+3:30 (IRST)
  - Summer (DST): UTC+4:30 (IRDT)

Hasanabad (Persian: حسن اباد, also Romanized as Ḩasanābād) is a village in Abravan Rural District, Razaviyeh District, Mashhad County, Razavi Khorasan Province, Iran. At the 2006 census, its population was 269, in 58 families.
