= Hasanabad-e Qadamgah =

Hasanabad-e Qadamgah حسن ابادقدمگاه
- Village
- Location within Iran
- Coordinates: 29°43′09″N 53°12′14″E
- Country: Iran
- Province: Fars
- County: Arsanjan
- Bakhsh: Central
- Rural District: Shurab

Population (2006)
  - Total: 131
- Time zone: UTC+3:30 (IRST)
  - Summer (DST): UTC+4:30 (IRDT)

Hasanabad-e Qadamgah (Persian: حسن ابادقدمگاه, also Romanized as Ḩasanābād-e Qadamgāh; also known as Ḩasanābād, Ḩassanābād, and Qadamgāh) is a village in Shurab Rural District, in the Central District of Arsanjan County, Fars province, Iran. At the 2006 census, its population was 131, in 26 families.
