= Hasanabad-e Karah =

Hasanabad-e Karah حسن ابادكره
- Village
- Location within Iran
- Coordinates: 34°39′42″N 46°30′55″E
- Country: Iran
- Province: Kermanshah
- County: Ravansar
- Bakhsh: Central
- Rural District: Dowlatabad

Population (2006)
  - Total: 213
- Time zone: UTC+3:30 (IRST)
  - Summer (DST): UTC+4:30 (IRDT)

Hasanabad-e Karah (Persian: حسن ابادكره, also Romanized as Ḩasanābād-e Karah; also known as Kūh Ḩasanābād) is a village in Dowlatabad Rural District, in the Central District of Ravansar County, Kermanshah Province, Iran. At the 2006 census, its population was 213, in 44 families.
