= Hoseynabad-e Tarman =

Hoseynabad-e Tarman حسين ابادترمان
- Village
- Location within Iran
- Coordinates: 27°22′04″N 53°05′14″E
- Country: Iran
- Province: Fars
- County: Lamerd
- Bakhsh: Central
- Rural District: Howmeh

Population (2006)
  - Total: 101
- Time zone: UTC+3:30 (IRST)
  - Summer (DST): UTC+4:30 (IRDT)

Hoseynabad-e Tarman (Persian: حسين ابادترمان, also Romanized as Ḩoseynābād-e Tarmān; also known as Ḩasanābād-e Tarmān) is a village in Howmeh Rural District, in the Central District of Lamerd County, Fars province, Iran. At the 2006 census, its population was 101, in 22 families.
