= Hasanabad-e Chenar Sukhteh =

Hasanabad-e Chenar Sukhteh حسن ابادچنارسوخته
- Village
- Location within Iran
- Coordinates: 37°05′40″N 57°31′29″E
- Country: Iran
- Province: North Khorasan
- County: Esfarayen
- Bakhsh: Central
- Rural District: Ruin

Population (2006)
  - Total: 193
- Time zone: UTC+3:30 (IRST)
  - Summer (DST): UTC+4:30 (IRDT)

Hasanabad-e Chenar Sukhteh (Persian: حسن ابادچنارسوخته, also Romanized as Ḩasanābād-e Chenār Sūkhteh; also known as Ḩasanābād) is a village in Ruin Rural District, in the Central District of Esfarayen County, North Khorasan Province, Iran. At the 2006 census, its population was 193, in 49 families.
