= Hasanabad-e Deh Gavi =

Hasanabad-e Deh Gavi حسن اباددهگاوي
- Village
- Location within Iran
- Coordinates: 28°45′54″N 59°07′14″E
- Country: Iran
- Province: Kerman
- County: Fahraj
- Bakhsh: Negin Kavir
- Rural District: Chahdegal

Population (2006)
  - Total: 24
- Time zone: UTC+3:30 (IRST)
  - Summer (DST): UTC+4:30 (IRDT)

Hasanabad-e Deh Gavi (Persian: حسن اباددهگاوي, also Romanized as Ḩasanābād-e Deh Gāvī; also known as Ḩasanābād) is a village in Chahdegal Rural District, Negin Kavir District, Fahraj County, Kerman Province, Iran. At the 2006 census, its population was 24, in 7 families.
