= Hasanabad, Esmaili =

Hasanabad حسن اباد
- Village
- Location within Iran
- Coordinates: 28°14′35″N 57°34′08″E
- Country: Iran
- Province: Kerman
- County: Anbarabad
- Bakhsh: Esmaili
- Rural District: Esmaili

Population (2006)
  - Total: 236
- Time zone: UTC+3:30 (IRST)
  - Summer (DST): UTC+4:30 (IRDT)

Hasanabad (Persian: حسن اباد, also Romanized as 'Ḩasanābād and Hassanābād; also known as Hasan Abad Daroo’iyeh and Hassahābād) is a village in Esmaili Rural District, Esmaili District, Anbarabad County, Kerman Province, Iran. At the 2006 census, its population was 236, in 54 families.
