= Jadidabad-e Shandak =

Jadidabad-e Shandak جديدابادشندك
- Village
- Location within Iran
- Coordinates: 28°28′39″N 60°27′17″E
- Country: Iran
- Province: Sistan and Baluchestan
- County: Khash
- Bakhsh: Nukabad
- Rural District: Gowhar Kuh

Population (2006)
  - Total: 189
- Time zone: UTC+3:30 (IRST)
  - Summer (DST): UTC+4:30 (IRDT)

Jadidabad-e Shandak (Persian: جديدابادشندك, also Romanized as Jadīdābād-e Shandak; also known as Shāndak, Shandak, Shandak Ghal‘eh Bīd, Shandak Morad Abad, and Shandaq) is a village in Gowhar Kuh Rural District, Nukabad District, Khash County, Sistan and Baluchestan Province, Iran. At the 2006 census, its population was 189, in 36 families.
