= Hasanabad, Majdabad =

Hasanabad حسن اباد
- Village
- Location within Iran
- Coordinates: 29°56′19″N 52°34′08″E
- Country: Iran
- Province: Fars
- County: Marvdasht
- Bakhsh: Central
- Rural District: Majdabad

Population (2006)
  - Total: 322
- Time zone: UTC+3:30 (IRST)
  - Summer (DST): UTC+4:30 (IRDT)

Hasanabad (Persian: حسن اباد, also Romanized as Ḩasanābād; also known as Ḩasanābād-e Rāmjerd and Hasan Abad Ramjerd) is a village in Majdabad Rural District, in the Central District of Marvdasht County, Fars province, Iran. At the 2006 census, its population was 322, in 74 families.
