= Hasanabad-e Sar Tappeh =

Hasanabad-e Sar Tappeh حسن ابادسرتپه
- Village
- Location within Iran
- Coordinates: 36°17′12″N 58°39′54″E
- Country: Iran
- Province: Razavi Khorasan
- County: Nishapur
- Bakhsh: Central
- Rural District: Mazul

Population (2006)
  - Total: 169
- Time zone: UTC+3:30 (IRST)
  - Summer (DST): UTC+4:30 (IRDT)

Hasanabad-e Sar Tappeh (Persian: حسن ابادسرتپه, also Romanized as Ḩasanābād-e Sar Tappeh; also known as Ḩasanābād) is a village in Mazul Rural District, in the Central District of Nishapur County, Razavi Khorasan Province, Iran. At the 2006 census, its population was 169, in 48 families.
