= Hasanabad-e Band =

Hasanabad-e Band حسن ابادبند
- Village
- Location within Iran
- Coordinates: 34°54′22″N 50°09′49″E
- Country: Iran
- Province: Markazi
- County: Saveh
- Bakhsh: Central
- Rural District: Nur Ali Beyk

Population (2006)
  - Total: 49
- Time zone: UTC+3:30 (IRST)
  - Summer (DST): UTC+4:30 (IRDT)

Hasanabad-e Band (Persian: حسن ابادبند, also Romanized as Ḩasanābād-e Band; also known as Ḩasanābād, Ḩoseynābād, and Husainābād) is a village in Nur Ali Beyk Rural District, in the Central District of Saveh County, Markazi Province, Iran.

== Census ==
At the 2006 census, its population was 49, in 12 families.
