= Hasanabad-e Sadat =

Hasanabad-e Sadat حسن ابادسادات
- Village
- Location within Iran
- Coordinates: 35°46′18″N 49°24′45″E
- Country: Iran
- Province: Qazvin
- County: Takestan
- Bakhsh: Ziaabad
- Rural District: Dodangeh-ye Sofla

Population (2006)
  - Total: 272
- Time zone: UTC+3:30 (IRST)
  - Summer (DST): UTC+4:30 (IRDT)

Hasanabad-e Sadat (Persian: حسن ابادسادات, also Romanized as Ḩasanābād-e Sādāt; also known as Ḩasanābād) is a village in Dodangeh-ye Sofla Rural District, Ziaabad District, Takestan County, Qazvin Province, Iran. At the 2006 census, its population was 272, in 76 families.
