= Hasanabad Rural District =

Hasanabad Rural District (Persian: دهستان حسن آباد, romanized: Dehestān-e Hasanābād) may refer to:

- Hasanabad Rural District (Eqlid County), Fars province
- Hasanabad Rural District (Eslamabad-e Gharb County), Kermanshah province
- Hasanabad Rural District (Ravansar County), Kermanshah province
- Hasanabad Rural District (Ray County), Tehran province
