= Hasanabad-e Kareyak =

Hasanabad-e Kareyak حسن ابادكريك
- Village
- Location within Iran
- Coordinates: 30°48′44″N 51°25′52″E
- Country: Iran
- Province: Kohgiluyeh and Boyer-Ahmad
- County: Dana
- Bakhsh: Central
- Rural District: Dana

Population (2006)
  - Total: 66
- Time zone: UTC+3:30 (IRST)
  - Summer (DST): UTC+4:30 (IRDT)

Hasanabad-e Kareyak (Persian: حسن ابادكريك, also Romanized as Ḩasanābād-e Kareyak; also known as Ḩasanābād) is a village in Dana Rural District, in the Central District of Dana County, Kohgiluyeh and Boyer-Ahmad Province, Iran. At the 2006 census, its population was 66, in 15 families.
