= Hasanabad, Tarom Sofla =

Hasanabad حسن اباد
- Village
- Location within Iran
- Coordinates: 36°35′24″N 49°12′00″E
- Country: Iran
- Province: Qazvin
- County: Qazvin
- Bakhsh: Tarom Sofla
- Rural District: Khandan

Population (2018)
  - Total: 172
- Time zone: UTC+3:30 (IRST)
  - Summer (DST): UTC+4:30 (IRDT)
- Website: t.me/hasanabad_sofla

Hasanabad (Persian: حسن اباد, also Romanized as Ḩasanābād) is a village in Khandan Rural District, Tarom Sofla District, Qazvin County, Qazvin Province, Iran. At the 2018 census, its population was 172, in 72 families.
