= Hasanabad, Bijar =

Hasanabad حسن آباد
- Village
- Location within Iran
- Coordinates: 35°51′17″N 47°39′25″E
- Country: Iran
- Province: Kurdistan
- County: Bijar
- Bakhsh: Central
- Rural District: Khvor Khvoreh

Population (2006)
  - Total: 45
- Time zone: UTC+3:30 (IRST)
  - Summer (DST): UTC+4:30 (IRDT)

Hasanabad (Persian: حسن آباد, also Romanized as Ḩasanābād; also known as Ḩasanābād-e Ḩowmeh) is a village in Khvor Khvoreh Rural District, in the Central District of Bijar County, Kurdistan Province, Iran. At the 2006 census, its population was 45, in 9 families. The village is populated by Kurds.
