= Hasanabad, Arzuiyeh =

Hasanabad حسن اباد
- Village
- Location within Iran
- Coordinates: 28°29′04″N 56°16′57″E
- Country: Iran
- Province: Kerman
- County: Arzuiyeh
- Bakhsh: Central
- Rural District: Arzuiyeh

Population (2006)
  - Total: 31
- Time zone: UTC+3:30 (IRST)
  - Summer (DST): UTC+4:30 (IRDT)

Hasanabad (Persian: حسن اباد, also Romanized as Ḩasanābād; also known as Ḩasanābād-e Sang Makī) is a village in Arzuiyeh Rural District, in the Central District of Arzuiyeh County, Kerman Province, Iran. At the 2006 census, its population was 31, in 5 families.
