= Hasanabad-e Marshad =

Hasanabad-e Marshad حسن ابادمرشد
- Village
- Location within Iran
- Coordinates: 31°18′35″N 54°05′42″E
- Country: Iran
- Province: Yazd
- County: Taft
- Bakhsh: Nir
- Rural District: Garizat

Population (2006)
  - Total: 103
- Time zone: UTC+3:30 (IRST)
  - Summer (DST): UTC+4:30 (IRDT)

Hasanabad-e Marshad (Persian: حسن ابادمرشد, also Romanized as Ḩasanābād-e Marshad; also known as ’asanābād and Ḩasanābād) is a village in Garizat Rural District, Nir District, Taft County, Yazd Province, Iran. At the 2006 census, its population was 103, in 28 families.
