= Hasanabad-e Olya, Kermanshah =

Hasanabad-e Olya حسن ابادعليا
- Village
- Location within Iran
- Coordinates: 34°36′52″N 47°22′25″E
- Country: Iran
- Province: Kermanshah
- County: Sahneh
- Bakhsh: Dinavar
- Rural District: Dinavar

Population (2006)
  - Total: 137
- Time zone: UTC+3:30 (IRST)
  - Summer (DST): UTC+4:30 (IRDT)

Hasanabad-e Olya (Persian: حسن ابادعليا, also Romanized as Ḩasanābād-e ‘Olyā) is a village in Dinavar Rural District, Dinavar District, Sahneh County, Kermanshah Province, Iran. At the 2006 census, its population was 137, in 36 families.
