= Hasanabad, Sumay-ye Beradust =

Hasanabad حسن اباد
- Village
- Location within Iran
- Coordinates: 38°00′59″N 44°49′25″E
- Country: Iran
- Province: West Azerbaijan
- County: Urmia
- Bakhsh: Sumay-ye Beradust
- Rural District: Sumay-ye Shomali

Population (2006)
  - Total: 372
- Time zone: UTC+3:30 (IRST)
  - Summer (DST): UTC+4:30 (IRDT)

Hasanabad (Persian: حسن اباد, also Romanized as Ḩasanābād; also known as Ḩasanābād-e ‘Olyā) is a village in Sumay-ye Shomali Rural District, Sumay-ye Beradust District, Urmia County, West Azerbaijan Province, Iran. At the 2006 census, its population was 372, in 61 families.
