= Hasanabad-e Olya, Kerman =

Hasanabad-e Olya حسن ابادعليا
- Village
- Location within Iran
- Coordinates: 28°57′31″N 56°35′57″E
- Country: Iran
- Province: Kerman
- County: Baft
- Bakhsh: Central
- Rural District: Dashtab

Population (2006)
  - Total: 55
- Time zone: UTC+3:30 (IRST)
  - Summer (DST): UTC+4:30 (IRDT)

Hasanabad-e Olya (Persian: حسن ابادعليا, also Romanized as Ḩasanābād-e ‘Olyā; also known as Ḩasanābād) is a village in Dashtab Rural District, in the Central District of Baft County, Kerman Province, Iran. At the 2006 census, its population was 55, in 10 families.
