= Hasanabad-e Yek, Anbarabad =

Hasanabad-e Yek حسن آباديك
- Village
- Location within Iran
- Coordinates: 28°19′40″N 57°42′55″E
- Country: Iran
- Province: Kerman
- County: Anbarabad
- Bakhsh: Esmaili
- Rural District: Ganjabad

Population (2006)
  - Total: 369
- Time zone: UTC+3:30 (IRST)
  - Summer (DST): UTC+4:30 (IRDT)

Hasanabad-e Yek (Persian: حسن آباديك, also Romanized as Ḩasanābād-e Yek; also known as Ḩasanābād and Hasan Abad Zargham) is a village in Ganjabad Rural District, Esmaili District, Anbarabad County, Kerman Province, Iran. At the 2006 census, its population was 369, in 76 families.
