= Hasanabad-e Mohammad Nazar =

Village in Kurdistan, Iran

Hasanabad-e Mohammad Nazar حسن آباد محمد نظر
- Village
- Location within Iran
- Coordinates: 34°59′54″N 48°01′13″E
- Country: Iran
- Province: Kurdistan
- County: Qorveh
- Bakhsh: Chaharduli
- Rural District: Chaharduli-ye Gharbi

Population (2006)
  - Total: 232
- Time zone: UTC+3:30 (IRST)
  - Summer (DST): UTC+4:30 (IRDT)

Hasanabad-e Mohammad Nazar (Persian: حسن آباد محمد نظر, also Romanized as Ḩasanābād-e Moḩammad Naz̧ar; also known as Ḩasanābād, Ḩasanābād-e Kohneh, and Ḩoseynābād) is a village in Chaharduli-ye Gharbi Rural District, Chaharduli District, Qorveh County, Kurdistan Province, Iran. At the 2006 census, its population was 232, in 55 families. The village is populated by Kurds.
