= Rahmatabad, Torbat-e Jam =

Village in Razavi Khorasan province, Iran

Rahmatabad Persian: رحمت اباد
- Village
- Location within Iran
- Coordinates: 35°12′54″N 60°43′36″E
- Country: Iran
- Province: Razavi Khorasan
- County: Torbat-e Jam
- District: Pain Jam
- Rural District: Gol Banu

Population (2016)
  - Total: 2,257
- Time zone: UTC+3:30 (IRST)

Rahmatabad (Persian: رحمت اباد) (Note: Also romanized as Raḩmatābād; also known as Ḩasanābād-e Kohneh) is a village in Gol Banu Rural District of Pain Jam District in Torbat-e Jam County, Razavi Khorasan province, Iran.

== Demographics ==
=== Population ===
At the time of the 2006 National Census, the village's population was 1,808 in 366 households. The following census in 2011 counted 2,040 people in 452 households. The 2016 census measured the population of the village as 2,257 people in 583 households.
