= Hasanabad, Ferdows =

Hasanabad حسن اباد
- Village
- Location within Iran
- Coordinates: 30°44′18″N 55°53′16″E
- Country: Iran
- Province: Kerman
- County: Rafsanjan
- Bakhsh: Ferdows
- Rural District: Rezvan

Population (1395)
  - Total: 1,650
- Time zone: UTC+3:30 (IRST)
  - Summer (DST): UTC+4:30 (IRDT)

Hasanabad (Persian: حسن اباد, also Romanized as Ḩasanābād; also known as Hasan Abad Olya) is a village in Rezvan Rural District, Ferdows District, Rafsanjan County, Kerman Province, Iran. At the 2006 census, its population was 706, in 165 families.
