= Hasanabad-e Sofla, Kerman =

Hasanabad-e Sofla حسن ابادسفلي
- Village
- Country: Iran
- Province: Kerman
- County: Baft
- Bakhsh: Central
- Rural District: Dashtab

Population (2006)
  - Total: 25
- Time zone: UTC+3:30 (IRST)
  - Summer (DST): UTC+4:30 (IRDT)

Hasanabad-e Sofla (Persian: حسن ابادسفلي, also Romanized as Ḩasanābād-e Soflá) is a village in Dashtab Rural District, in the Central District of Baft County, Kerman Province, Iran. At the 2006 census, its population was 25, in 4 families.
