= Hasanabad-e Olya, South Khorasan =

Hasanabad-e Olya حسن‌آبادعليا
- village
- Location within Iran
- Coordinates: 33°22′40″N 59°42′07″E
- Country: Iran
- Province: South Khorasan
- County: Zirkuh
- Bakhsh: Zohan
- Rural District: Zohan

Population (2006)
  - Total: 217
- Time zone: UTC+3:30 (IRST)
  - Summer (DST): UTC+4:30 (IRDT)

Hasanabad-e Olya (Persian: حسن‌آبادعليا, also Romanized as Ḩasanābād-e ‘Olyā; also known as Ḩasanābād) is a village in Zohan Rural District, Zohan District, Zirkuh County, South Khorasan Province, Iran. At the 2006 census, its population was 217, in 52 families.
