= Hasanabad-e Olya, Fars =

Hasanabad-e Olya حسن ابادعليا
- Village
- Location within Iran
- Coordinates: 29°15′51″N 51°59′31″E
- Country: Iran
- Province: Fars
- County: Kazerun
- Bakhsh: Jereh and Baladeh
- Rural District: Jereh

Population (2006)
  - Total: 107
- Time zone: UTC+3:30 (IRST)
  - Summer (DST): UTC+4:30 (IRDT)

Hasanabad-e Olya (Persian: حسن ابادعليا, also Romanized as Ḩasanābād-e 'Olyā; also known as Ḩasanābād-e Bālā) is a village in Jereh Rural District, Jereh and Baladeh District, Kazerun County, Fars province, Iran. At the 2006 census, its population was 107, in 23 families.
