= Hasanabad-e Sofla, Fars =

Hasanabad-e Sofla حسن ابادسفلي
- Village
- Location within Iran
- Coordinates: 29°15′20″N 51°58′30″E
- Country: Iran
- Province: Fars
- County: Kazerun
- Bakhsh: Jereh and Baladeh
- Rural District: Jereh

Population (2006)
  - Total: 317
- Time zone: UTC+3:30 (IRST)
  - Summer (DST): UTC+4:30 (IRDT)

Hasanabad-e Sofla (Persian: حسن ابادسفلي, also Romanized as Ḩasanābād-e Soflá; also known as Ḩasanābād-e Pā’īn) is a village in Jereh Rural District, Jereh and Baladeh District, Kazerun County, Fars province, Iran. At the 2006 census, its population was 317, in 75 families.
