= Karvan District (Tiran and Karvan County) =

District in Isfahan province, Iran

Karvan District Persian: بخش کرون
- District
- Location within Iran
- Coordinates: 32°54′N 50°50′E
- Country: Iran
- Province: Isfahan
- County: Tiran and Karvan
- Established: 1997
- Capital: Asgaran

Population (2016)
  - Total: 32,684
- Time zone: UTC+3:30 (IRST)

Karvan District (Persian: بخش کرون) is in Tiran and Karvan County, Isfahan province, Iran. Its capital is the city of Asgaran.

== Demographics ==
=== Population ===
At the time of the 2006 National Census, the district's population was 31,126 in 8,395 households. The following census in 2011 counted 32,648 people in 9,761 households. The 2016 census measured the population of the district as 32,684 inhabitants in 10,147 households.

=== Administrative divisions ===
Karvan District Population
Administrative Divisions	2006	2011	2016
Karvan-e Olya RD	9,023	8,809	8,110
Karvan-e Sofla RD (Note: Formerly Karvan-e Vosta Rural District)	18,066	19,318	19,716
Asgaran (city)	4,037	4,521	4,858
Total	31,126	32,648	32,684
RD = Rural District
