= Tiran and Karvan County =

County in Isfahan province, Iran

Tiran and Karvan County Persian: شهرستان تیران و کرون
- County
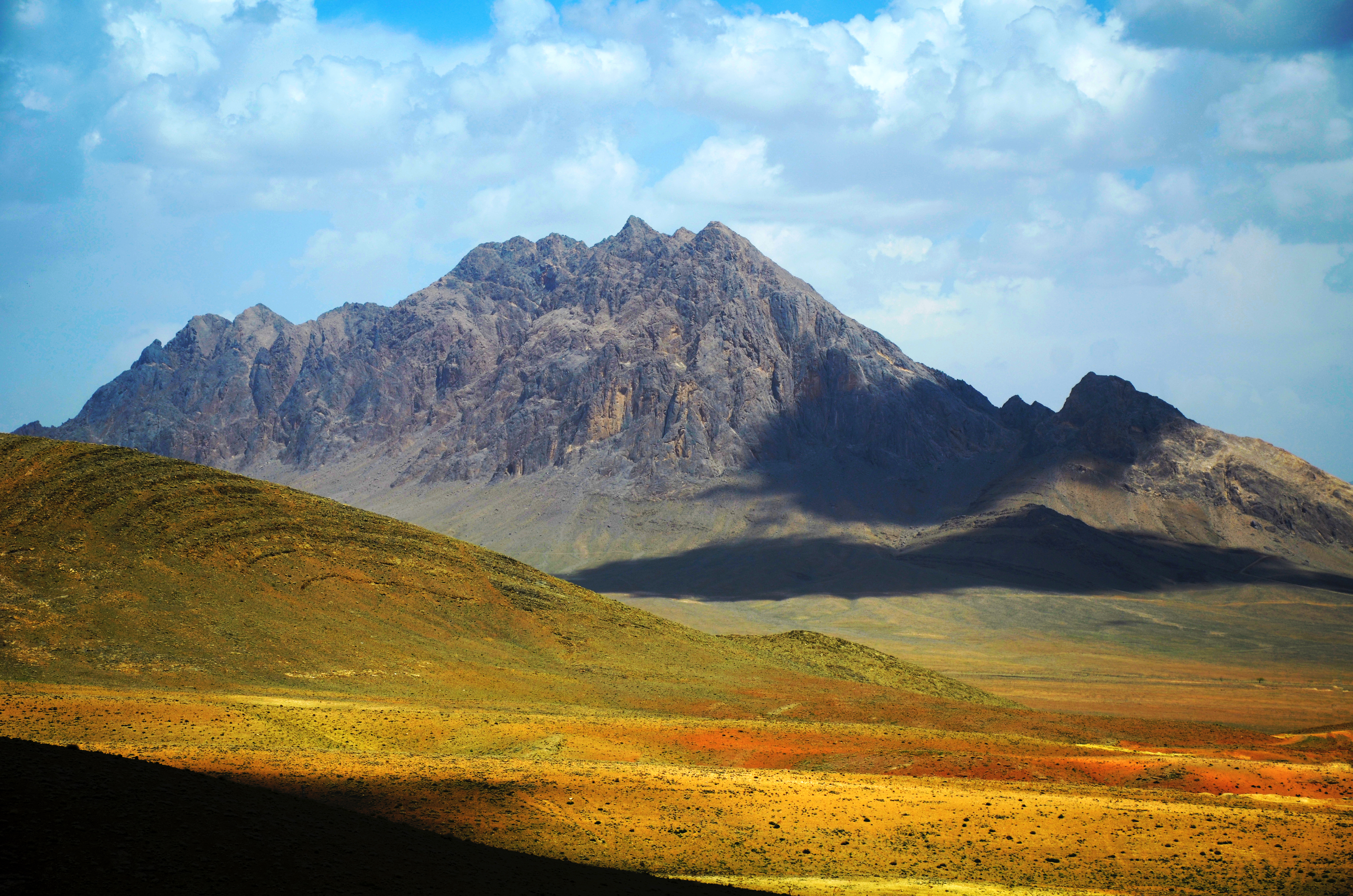
- Landscape off the Tiran–Chadegan Road

- Location of Tiran and Karvan County in Isfahan province (center left, yellow)

- Location of Isfahan province in Iran
- Coordinates: 32°47′N 50°53′E
- Country: Iran
- Province: Isfahan
- Established: 1997
- Capital: Tiran
- Districts: Central, Karvan

Population (2016)
  - Total: 71,575
- Time zone: UTC+3:30 (IRST)

Tiran and Karvan County (Persian: شهرستان تیران و کرون) is in Isfahan province, Iran. Its capital is the city of Tiran.

== Demographics ==
=== Population ===
At the time of the 2006 National Census, the county's population was 64,043 in 17,802 households. The following census in 2011 counted 69,047 people in 21,031 households. The 2016 census measured the population of the county as 71,575 in 22,704 households.

=== Administrative divisions ===
Tiran and Karvan County's population history and administrative structure over three consecutive censuses are shown in the following table.

Tiran and Karvan County Population
Administrative Divisions	2006	2011	2016
Central District	32,917	36,399	38,889
Rezvaniyeh RD	4,303	3,769	3,837
Varposht RD (Note: Formerly Karvan-e Sofla Rural District)	9,299	9,701	9,743
Rezvanshahr (city) (Note: Formerly the village of Shahrak-e Rezvan)	3,642	3,508	3,606
Tiran (city)	15,673	19,421	21,703
Karvan District	31,126	32,648	32,684
Karvan-e Olya RD	9,023	8,809	8,110
Karvan-e Sofla RD (Note: Formerly Karvan-e Vosta Rural District)	18,066	19,318	19,716
Asgaran (city)	4,037	4,521	4,858
Total	64,043	69,047	71,575
RD = Rural District

== See also ==
Media related to Tiran and Karvan County at Wikimedia Commons
