= Mobarakabad =

Mobarakabad (Persian: مبارک‌آباد), also rendered as Mubarakabad, may refer to:

- Mobarakabad, East Azerbaijan
- Mobarakabad, Estahban, Fars province
- Mobarakabad, Madar-e Soleyman, Pasargad County, Fars province
- Mobarakabad, Sarpaniran, Fars province
- Mobarakabad, Qir and Karzin, Fars province
- Mobarakabad, Rasht, Gilan province
- Mobarakabad, Kuchesfahan, Rasht County, Gilan province
- Mobarakabad, Shaft, Gilan province
- Mobarakabad, Golestan
- Mobarakabad, Kabudarahang, Hamadan province
- Mobarakabad, Malayer, Hamadan province
- Mobarakabad, Tuyserkan, Hamadan province
- Mobarakabad, Isfahan
- Mobarakabad, alternate name of Allahabad, Lenjan, Isfahan province
- Mobarakabad, Natanz, Isfahan province
- Mobarakabad, Kerman
- Mobarakabad, Kurdistan
- Mobarakabad, Dehgolan, Kurdistan province
- Mobarakabad-e Sepidar, Kurdistan province
- Mobarakabad, Lorestan
- Mobarakabad, Arak, Markazi province
- Mobarakabad, Tafresh, Markazi province
- Mobarakabad, Qom
- Mobarakabad, South Khorasan
- Mobarabakabad, alternate name of Karijgan, South Khorasan province
- Mobarakabad, West Azerbaijan
- Mobarakabad, Zanjan
- Mobarakabad Rural District, Fars province

== See also ==
- Mobarak (disambiguation)
- Mubarak (disambiguation)
- Mubarakpur (disambiguation)
