= Mobarakeh (disambiguation) =

Mobarakeh is a city in Isfahan Province, Iran.

Mobarakeh or Mobarkeh or Mobarekeh (Persian: مباركه) may refer to:

- Mobarakeh, Qir and Karzin, Fars province
- Mobarakeh, Sepidan, Fars province
- Mobarakeh, Isfahan
- Mobarakeh, Ardestan, Isfahan province
- Mobarakeh, Tiran and Karvan, Isfahan province
- Mobarakeh, Bardsir, Kerman province
- Mobarakeh, Sirjan, Kerman province
- Mobarakeh 2, Khuzestan province
- Mobarakeh 3, Khuzestan province
- Mobarakeh, Nishapur, Razavi Khorasan province
- Mobarakeh, Bafq, Yazd province
- Mobarakeh, Marvast, Khatam County, Yazd province
- Mobarakeh, Taft, Yazd province
- Mobarakeh County, in Isfahan province
- Mobarakeh Rural District (Bafq County), Yazd province
- Mobarakeh Rural District (Marvast County), Yazd province

== See also ==
- Mubarak (disambiguation)
