= Mubarakpur =

Mubarakpur, Mubarkpur, or Mubarak Pur may refer to:

== Places ==
=== India ===
- Mubarakpur, Azamghar, a town and a municipal board in Azamgarh district, Uttar Pradesh, India
- Mubarakpur, Bhulath, a village in Bholath, Punjab, India
- Mubarak Pur Dabas, a village in Delhi, India
- Mubarakpur, Harchandpur, a village in Rae Bareli district, Uttar Pradesh, India
- Mubarakpur, Jalandhar, a village in Jalandhar district, Punjab, India
- Mubarakpur, Lalganj, a village in Rae Bareli district, Uttar Pradesh, India
- Mubarkpur, a village in Punjab, India

=== Pakistan ===
- Mubarakpur, Jacobabad, a town in Sindh, Pakistan

== Other ==
- Mubarakpur Assembly constituency, a constituency of the Uttar Pradesh legislative assembly in Azamgarh district, India
- Mubarakpur railway station, a railway station in Punjab, Pakistan

== See also ==
- Mobarakabad (disambiguation)
