= Mubarak (disambiguation) =

Hosni Mubarak (1928–2020) was an Egyptian military and political leader who was President of Egypt from 1981 to 2011.

Mubarak may also refer to:

- Mubarak (name), an Arabic given name and surname
  - Mubarak (actor), Indian character actor
- Eid Mubarak, a traditional Muslim greeting
- Mubarak Al Kabeer Port, a controversial port scheduled to be built in Kuwait
- Mubarak, Iran (disambiguation)
- Mubarak Mosque (disambiguation)
- Mubarakan, 2017 Indian film by Anees Bazmee

== See also ==
- Barak (disambiguation)
- Barak (given name)
- Barakah
- Baraka (disambiguation)
- Barakat (disambiguation)
- Mebarak, surname
- Mobarak (disambiguation)
- Mobarakeh (disambiguation)
- Mobarakabad (disambiguation)
