= Mobarak =

Mobarak may refer to:

People:

- Mobarak Homoud Alkody (born 1995), entrepreneur & PhD in Computational Linguistics in Saudi Arabia
- Ahmed Al-Mobarak (born 1985), midfielder at Al-Ettifaq Club in Saudi Arabia
- Al-Bandari Mubarak (born 2001), Saudi Arabian footballer
- Fahed Al-Mobarak (born 1984), football player for Al-Hilal in the Saudi Premier League
- Khalid Mobarak Habeeb-Allah Alqurashi, citizen of Saudi Arabia
- Mobarak Hossain Khan (1938–2019), Bangladeshi music researcher, music expert and musician
- Mobarak Ali Pathan, Indian politician
- Anas Mobarak (born 1984), Ghana born naturalized Qatari footballer

Other:

- Mobarak, Iran (disambiguation)
- Mobarak International Puppet Theater Festival (est.1989) in Tehran, Iran, about every two years
- Mobarak Mosque, The Hague, the first purpose-built mosque in the Netherlands
- Mobarak port, project under construction in Bubiyan Island, Kuwait
- Molly & Mobarak, 2003 Australian documentary directed by Tom Zubrycki

== See also ==
- Mubarak (disambiguation)
- Mobarakeh (disambiguation)
- Mobaraki, Iran (disambiguation)
- Mobarakabad (disambiguation)
