= Al-Noor Mosque (Hanoi) =

Mosque in Hanoi, Vietnam

- Thánh đường Hồi giáo Al-Noor
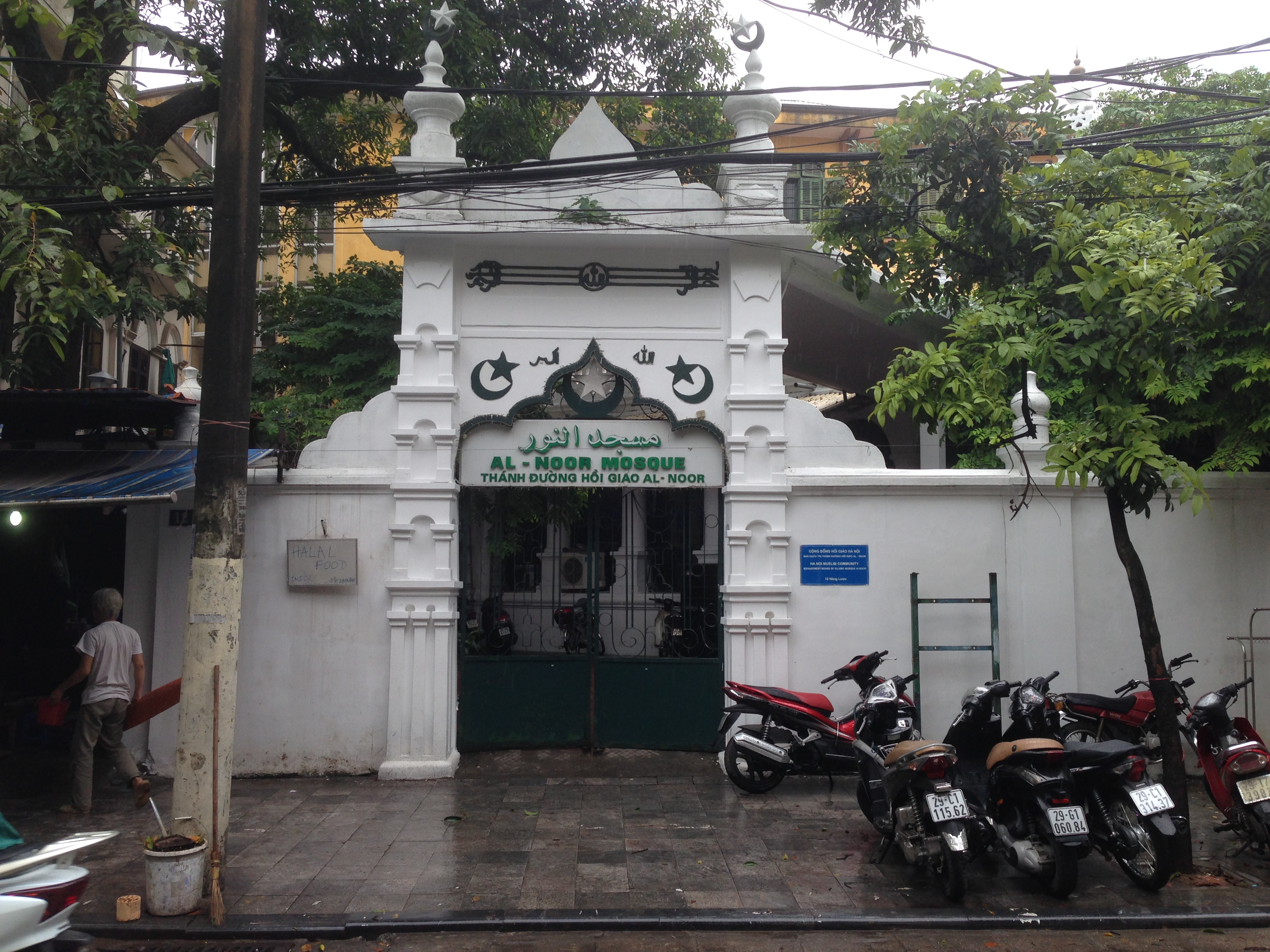
- Al-Noor Mosque in 2013

- Location within Vietnam

Religion
- Affiliation: Islam
- Branch/tradition: Sunnism
- Ownership: Hanoi Muslim Community

Location
- Location: 12 Hàng Lược street, Hoàn Kiếm, Hanoi, Vietnam
- Interactive map of Al-Noor Mosque
- Coordinates: 21°2′17″N 105°50′51″E

Architecture
- Type: Mosque
- Style: Islamic architecture Indian architecture

Specifications
- Capacity: 200 – 300
- Site area: 700 m^{2}

The Al-Noor Mosque (Vietnamese: Thánh đường Hồi giáo Al-Noor) is a mosque in Hoàn Kiếm ward, Hanoi, Vietnam. It is the only mosque in Hanoi and northern Vietnam.

== History ==
In the early 19th century, merchants from India and Middle Eastern countries came to northern Vietnam to trade fabrics and exchange currencies. In Hanoi, they lived in the Hang Dao area (present-day Hoàn Kiếm). To meet religious needs, in 1885, a group of Indians from Bombay (now Mumbai, India) raised money to build the Al-Noor Mosque. The mosque has an area of about 700m^{2}, officially operating in 1890. In the years 1964 – 1973, the mosque had to close due to the war. However, it was not destroyed by bombs, and reopened in 1990.

In the early 1990s, Hanoi had no openly active local Muslim community. The number of Muslims was insignificant, mainly diplomats and staff of the embassies of Indonesia, Pakistan, Iran, and Egypt. Khalid – a Malaysian working in Hanoi as a manager of Malaysia Airlines – is credited with helping to reopen the mosque.

As the then–Malaysian Ambassador was a non-Muslim, and Khalid was only a businessman, he could not convince the government to reopen the Mosque. Later, thanks to the Iranian Ambassador signing an agreement, the mosque was reopened.

== Architecture ==
Al-Noor Mosque is located in the west to face Mecca, with Indian architecture through details such as domes, arches, and minarets. The main prayer hall has high and wide arched windows and the entire building is painted white.

== See also ==
- Islam in Vietnam
- List of mosques in Vietnam
