= Al Rahim Mosque =

Mosque in Ho Chi Minh City, Vietnam

- Masjid Al Rahim
- Location within Vietnam

Religion
- Affiliation: Islam
- Branch/tradition: Sunni

Location
- Location: 45 Nam Kỳ Khởi Nghĩa, Phường Nguyễn Thái Bình, Quận 1, Ho Chi Minh City, Vietnam
- Interactive map of Al Rahim Mosque
- Coordinates: 10°46′12″N 106°42′5″E

Architecture
- Established: 1885

Al Rahim Mosque is one of the oldest Islamic places of worship in Vietnam. It stands amidst commercial landmarks li.ke Bến Thành Market and Ho Chi Minh City Hall.

== History ==
Al Rahim Mosque is recorded as the oldest mosque in Saigon (present-day Ho Chi Minh City), serving the spiritual needs of Malaysian and Indonesian Muslims since its original construction in 1885. The mosque underwent comprehensive rebuilding in 2009.

== Architecture and Facilities ==
The current structure features traditional Islamic architectural elements, including ornate decorations and symbolic motifs like crescents and stars. Its design blends Islamic aesthetic traditions with adaptations suited to the urban Vietnamese environment.

Al Rahim Mosque primarily serves Muslim worshippers from Southeast Asian countries, especially Malaysia and Indonesia, reflecting the demographics of its founding communities.

Wudu (ablution) facilities, restroom, a women's prayer hall, and limited parking are available. The prayer hall is wheelchair accessible.

The mosque also includes nearby halal food stalls and serves as a cultural and spiritual waypoint for travelers and residents alike.

== See also ==
- Islam in Vietnam
- List of mosques in Vietnam
