= Mubarak Mosque =

Mubarak Mosque (English: “Mosque of the blessed”) may refer to:

- Mubarak Mosque (An Giang), Vietnam
- Mubarak Mosque (Qadian), Punjab, India
- Mubarak Mosque (Tilford), England
- Moubarak Mosque, Val-d'Oise (Masjid Moubarak), France
- Mobarak Mosque (The Hague), Netherlands

== See also ==
- Mubarak (disambiguation)
