= Al Ehsan Mosque =

Mosque in An Phú, An Giang, Vietnam

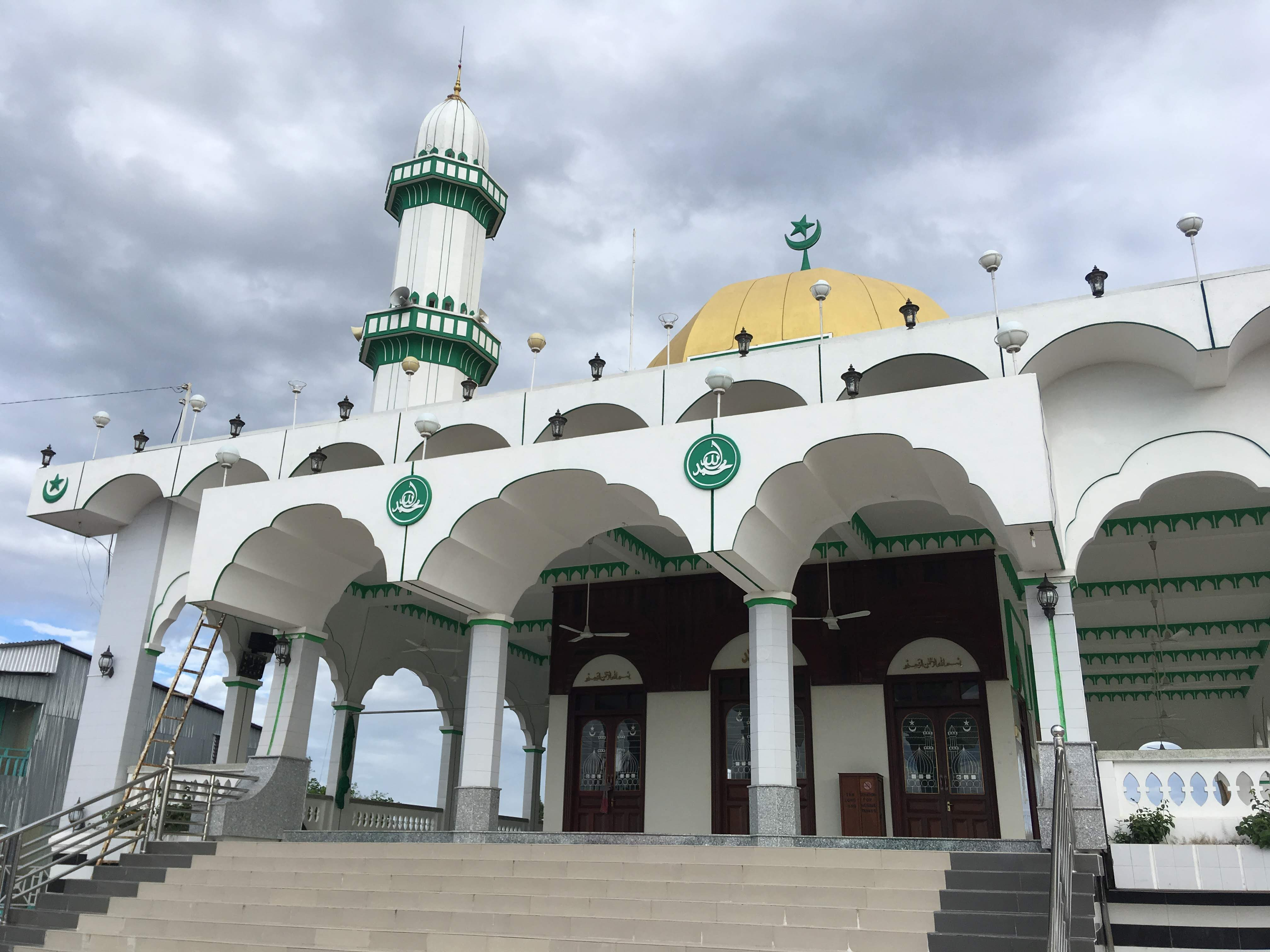

- Location within Vietnam

Religion
- Affiliation: Islam

Location
- Location: An Phú, An Giang, Vietnam
- Interactive map of Al Ehsan Mosque
- Coordinates: 10°43′29.2″N 105°7′27.3″E

Architecture
- Type: mosque
- Established: 1937

The Al Ehsan Mosque is a mosque in An Phú, An Giang Province, Vietnam.

== History ==
The mosque was constructed in 1937 in a village whose population are the Muslim Chams. It underwent renovation in 1992.

== Architecture ==
The mosque is a white building with green decorative borders. It consists of one ground floor and one mezzanine floor. Its interior is decorated with chandeliers and stone pillars. There is a Muslim cemetery just outside the mosque building complex.

== See also ==
- List of mosques in Vietnam
- Islam in Vietnam
