= Bank for Investment and Development of Vietnam =

Vietnamese state-owned bank in Vietnam

- Trade name: Bank for Investment and Development of Vietnam (BIDV)
- Native name: Ngân hàng TMCP Đầu tư và Phát triển Việt Nam
- Type: State-owned
- Industry: Banking, Finance, Security
- Founded: 26 April 1957
- Headquarters: Hoan Kiem, Hanoi, Vietnam
- Key people: Lê Ngọc Lâm, CEO; Phan Đức Tú Chairman
- Products: Transaction accounts Insurance stock brokerage Investment bank Asset-based lending Consumer finance Trade; International payments Foreign exchange
- Net income: $315 million USD
- Total assets: $72 billion USD
- Owner: Vietnamese government Ministry of Information and Communications
- Number of employees: 23,200 full time equivalent
- Website: bidv.com.vn

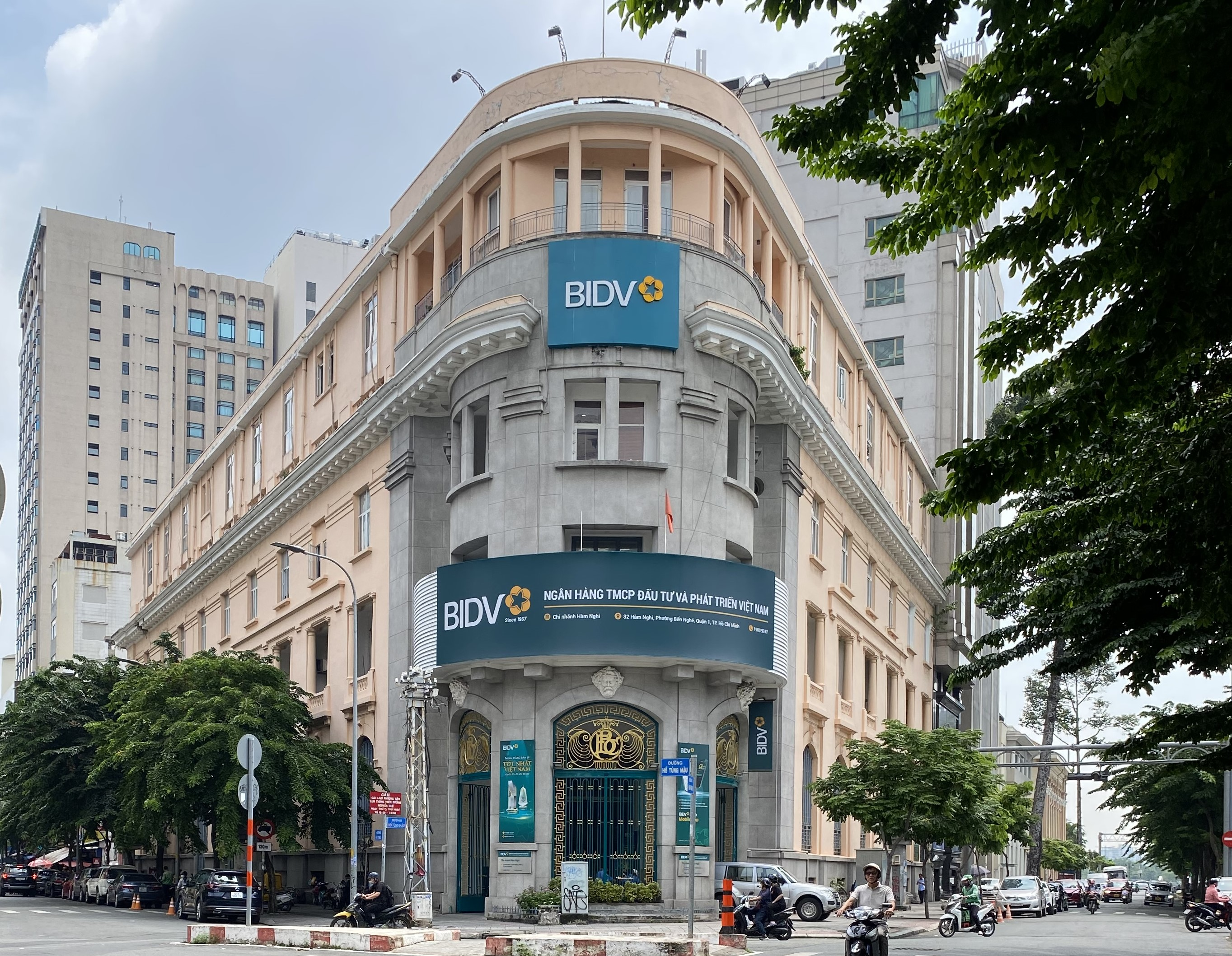
A BIDV branch in Ho Chi Minh City, in the former building of the Franco-Chinese Bank

BIDV (/ˌbiːdiːˈviː/) or formally the Joint Stock Commercial Bank for Investment and Development of Vietnam (Vietnamese: Ngân hàng Thương mại Cổ phần Đầu tư và Phát triển Việt Nam) is a Vietnamese state-owned bank in Vietnam. It is the country's biggest bank by assets ($72 billion USD) as of June 2021. According to the United Nations Development Programme report on the 100 largest enterprises in Vietnam, BIDV is in the 4th position after Agribank, VNPT, and EVN.

BIDV received Asia Risk Magazine's House of the Year Award for being at the forefront of the country's economic development by modernizing its risk management and developing new financial products like energy derivatives hedges.

== History ==
BIDV was established on 26 April 1957 as the Bank for Construction of Vietnam (Ngân hàng Kiến thiết Việt Nam), under which name it operated until 24 June 1981, at which point it changed its name to the Bank for Investment and Construction of Vietnam (Ngân hàng Đầu tư và Xây dựng Việt Nam). It adopted its present name on 14 November 1990.

In January 2007, the Vietnamese government announced that it would sell a minority stake in the BIDV and three other banks. In March of the same year, they sought the government's permission to invest in highway projects. In September 2007, they announced that they would form Vietnam's first aircraft finance group in Hanoi in a joint venture with Vietnam Airlines, PetroVietnam, and Vietnam Post and Telecommunication.

In November 2019 BIDV officially signed a strategic cooperation agreement with Hana Bank and announced the Korean bank as its foreign strategic shareholder who owns 15% of its charter capital. This is the biggest M&A deal with a strategic investor in Vietnam's banking industry.

== Outstanding issues ==
=== Ability to resolve bad debts ===
The ability to resolve bad debts is a pressing issue that requires BIDV's attention. The bank's bad debt level remains high, with provisions for bad debts rising to 87.1% by the end of September 2020, the highest increase in the past two years. At the same time, the foreclosure of bad debts has also faced many difficulties when many collateral assets are put up for sale but there are no partners to buy them back, even if the assets have been put up for sale and reduced in price more than 30 times; many assets with good liquidity value still do not reach the right buyers.

=== Service quality needs improvement ===
During the Lunar New Year holidays, when the demand for cash spending increases, the ATM systems of Vietnamese banks often experience temporary overload, making it difficult for many customers to withdraw money. BIDV has not yet been able to address this common problem. In 2022, BIDV received 4 prestigious awards for banking services for individuals.

== See also ==
- List of banks in Vietnam
- Bank for Investment and Development of Cambodia
