= Bank for Investment and Development of Cambodia =

Cambodian bank

Bank for Investment and Development of Cambodia Plc.
- Formerly: Prosperity Investment Bank
- Company type: State-owned
- Industry: Banking, Finance, Security
- Founded: 1 September 2009
- Headquarters: Hoan Kiem, Phnom Penh, Cambodia
- Area served: Cambodia, Vietnam
- Key people: Lê Đào Nguyên (Chairman); Nguyễn Quốc Hưng (CEO)
- Net income: 3.14 million USD
- Total assets: $716.4million USD
- Number of employees: 335
- Parent: Bank for Investment and Development of Vietnam
- Website: www.bidc.com.kh

The Bank for Investment and Development of Cambodia (Vietnamese: Ngân Hàng Đầu Tư và Phát Triển Campuchia, Khmer: ធនាគារវិនិយោគ និងអភិវឌ្ឍន៍កម្ពុជា ភីអិលស៊ី) is a bank in Cambodia. It is a subsidiary of the Bank for Investment and Development of Vietnam.

The bank has branches in all major cities of Cambodia, as well as in Hanoi and Ho Chi Minh City.

The predecessor of the bank was called the Prosperity Investment Bank, which was founded in 2007. After restructuring, it was given the current name Bank for Investment and Development of Cambodia, or in short BIDC. BIDC is majority owned by the Bank for Investment and Development of Vietnam through its daughter Cambodian Investment & Development Co Ltd. In 2011, the bank was one of top 5 banks in Cambodia by assets.

The mission of the bank of to provide capital for investment in Cambodia, in particular investments by Vietnamese entities, and investments through BIDC form a significant part of Vietnamese investments in Cambodia.

== See also ==
- List of banks in Cambodia
