= Saigon Central Mosque =

Mosque in Ho Chi Minh City, Vietnam

- Nhà thờ Hồi giáo Musulman
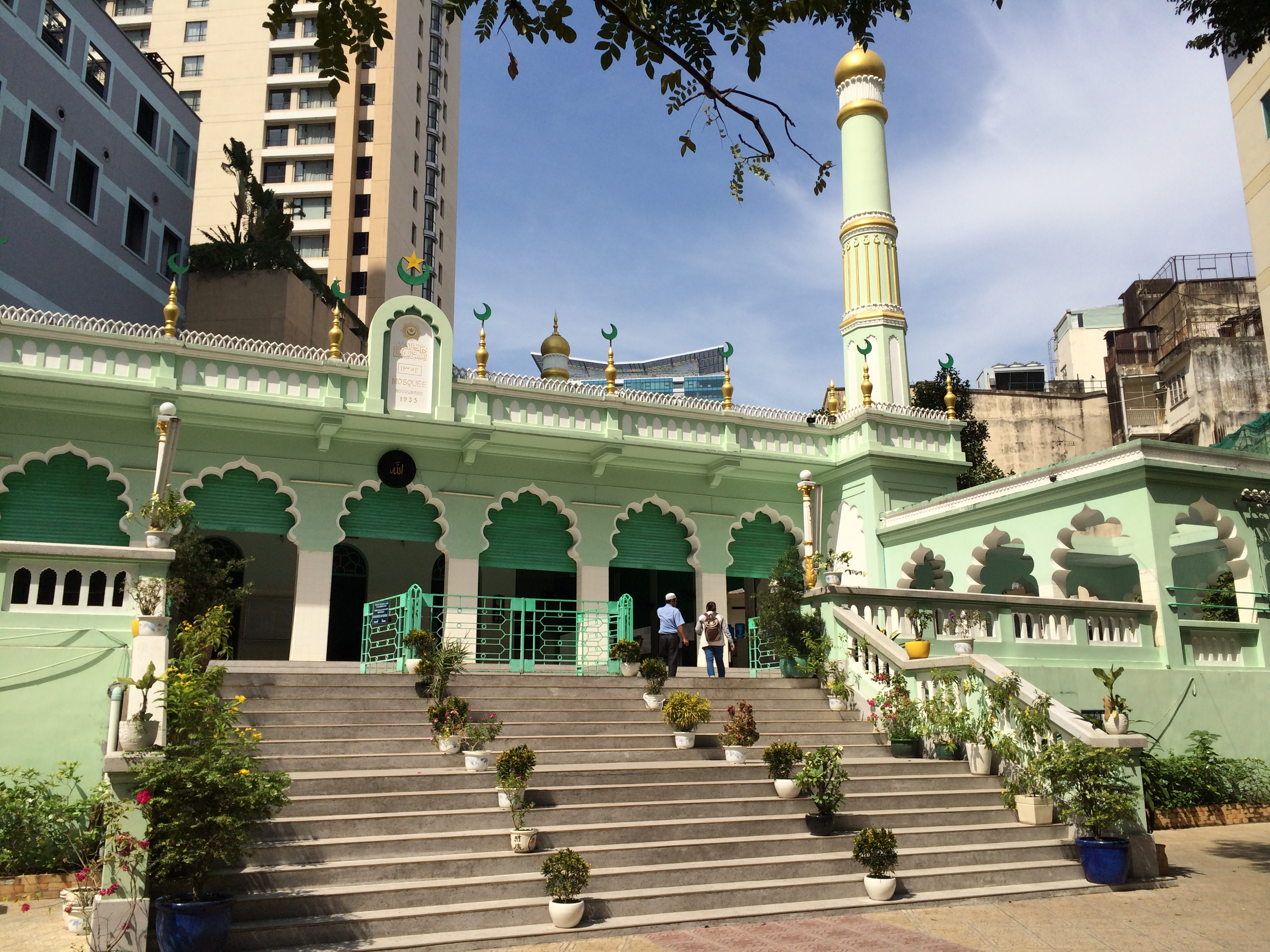

- Location within Vietnam

Religion
- Affiliation: Islam

Location
- Location: Ho Chi Minh City, Vietnam
- Coordinates: 10°46′34.4″N 106°42′15.4″E

Architecture
- Type: mosque
- Style: ancient Roman
- Established: 1935
- Minaret: 4

The Saigon Central Mosque (Vietnamese: Nhà thờ Hồi giáo Musulman) is a mosque in Ho Chi Minh City, Vietnam and it is one of the ancient and historic Mosque in the region. It was completed in the Year 1935 since the construction began in 1934 December 21 and was led by JM Mohamed Ismael, Chief of the Muslims Congregations, Head of British Indian Muslims Community.

== History ==
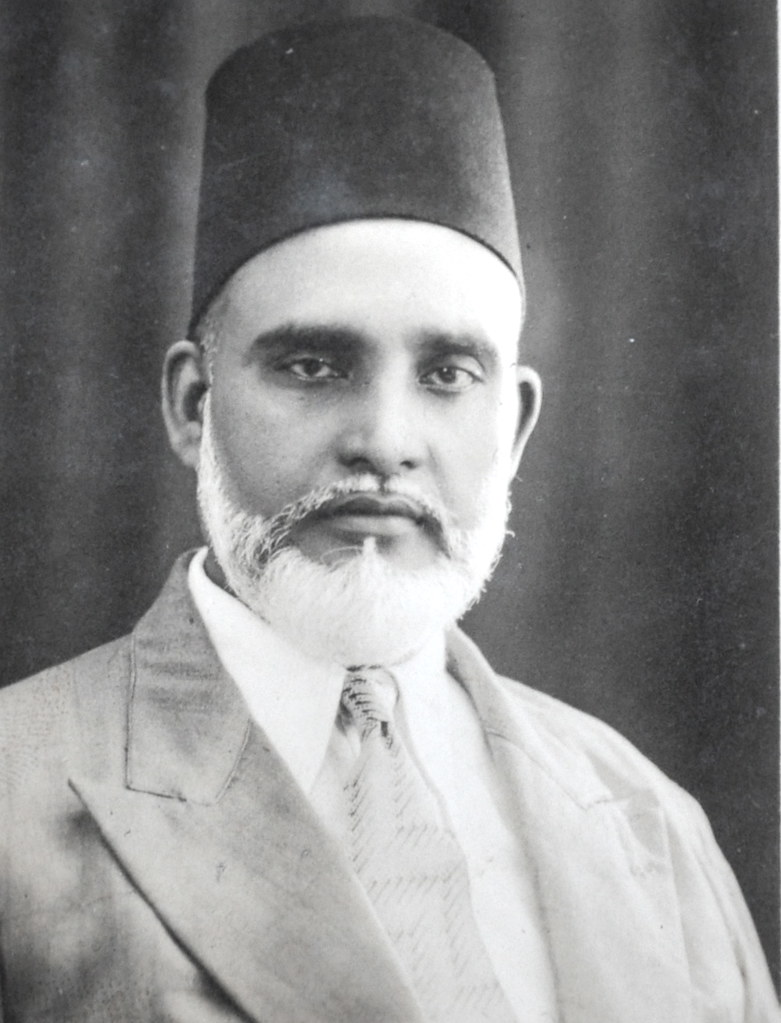
Official Portrait of Khan Saheb JM Mohamed Ismael

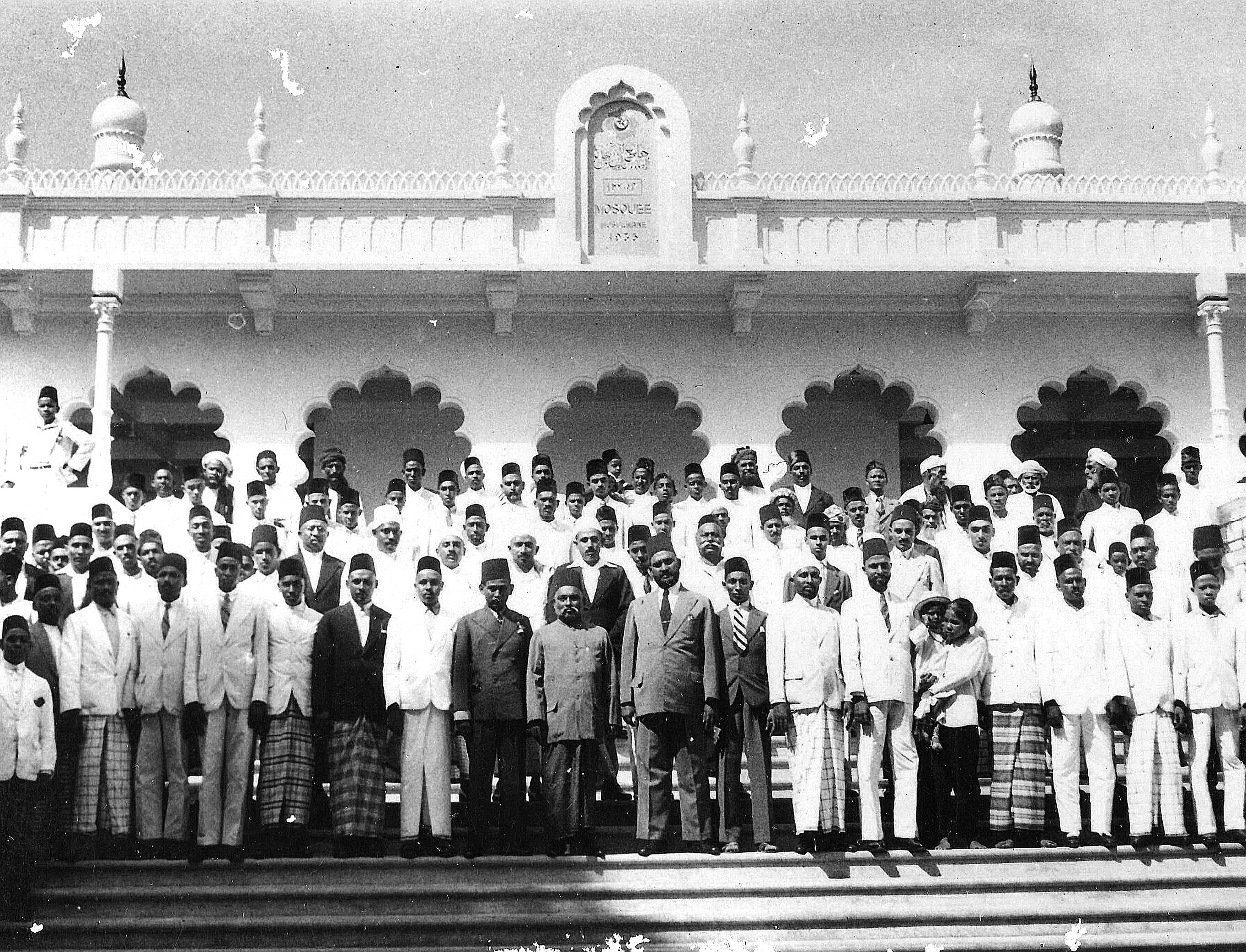
Opening Ceremony of Saigon Central Mosque in 1935

The mosque was established in 1935 as the India Jamia Muslim Mosque.

== JM Mohamed Ismael of Koothanallur ==
JM Mohamed Ismael (1888 - c. 1945) born in the Southern part of India, nowadays Koothanallur, Tamil Nadu, came to Saigon in 1903 among his brother to expand his business named "JM Mohamed Ismael Freres" on Rue Catinat, Saigon. He was born to JM Mohamed Abdul Kader, the textile retailer in his native, and Fathima Beevi KR. He was the first son among 10 children, names as order: JM Ayesha, JM Mohamed Ibrahim, JM Abdullah, JM Ahamedsha, JM Abdul Hameed, JM Abdul Rahim, JM Khateeja, JM Abdul Aziz (Chevalier de la legion D Honneur) and JM Abdul Mohamed.

JM Mohamed Ismael was honoured by the Indian Government as the title "Khan Saheb" was awarded in recognition of his public services on 13 January 1943.

The similar designed masjid (with only 3 entrances) constructed in his native village Koothanallur was named as Fathima Masjid of Marakkadai and handed over (wakf) to Manba Ul Ula Society, Koothanallur. The Fathima Masjid of Marakkadai was named in honour of his deceased wife Fathima Beevi. There are more unknown masjids and lastly there is a madrasa in Thirumalairayapattinam (Tamil Nadu).

JM Mohamed Ismael had 3 sons: JM Mohyadin BA (Aligarh), JM Kareem and JM Rahmatullah BA and 4 Daughters.

His first son JM Mohyadin BA (Alig) is known for being the first Tamil person to enter Hong Kong, as per the records of "Ettaam Arivu - Kadai kadantha Kadai".

JM Mohyadin was also known for being the First Graduate of Koothanallur, and served as the long-time director of Thiru Arooran Sugars Limited, former correspondent of Manba ul ula School, Koothanallur, Director General of JM Mohamed Ismael Fils Aziz & Company, Saigon, former President of Koothanallur Panchayat, former President of Koothanallur Muslim League.

== Nehru Visit to Saigon Central Mosque ==
Jawaharlal Nehru visited Vietnam on 17 October 1954, making him one of the key figures in establishing the foundation of modern Vietnam-India friendship alongside President Ho Chi Minh. This visit occurred shortly after Hanoi was liberated, and it was reciprocated by Ho Chi Minh's visit to India in February 1958. Nehru and Indira Gandhi visited Saigon Central Mosque and the Indian Community meeting held there which was led by JM Abdul Aziz.

== Architecture ==
The mosque was constructed with ancient Roman architectural style. It consists of four minarets.

== See also ==
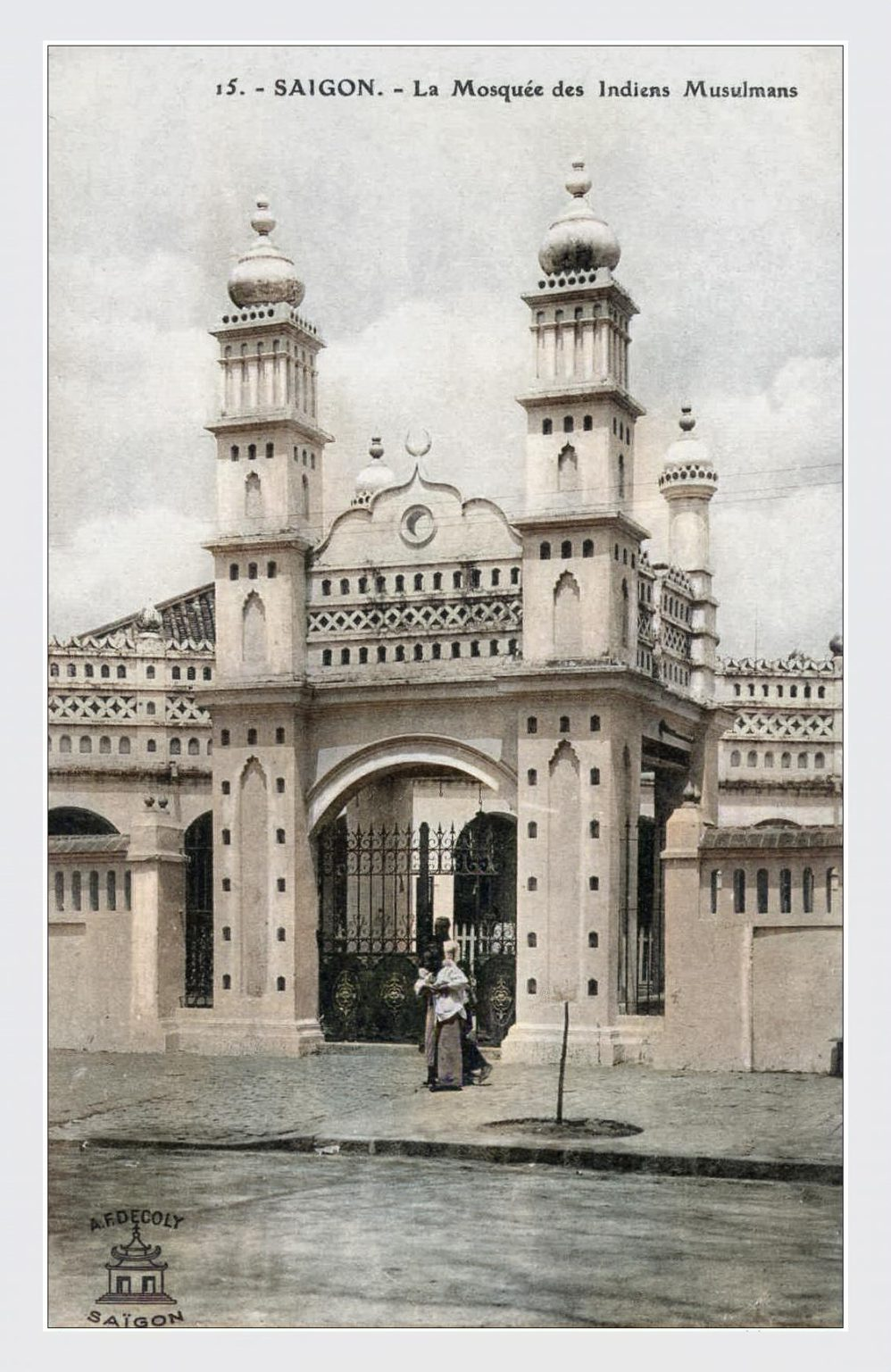
Indian Mosque in Saigon 1911

- Islam in Vietnam
- List of mosques in Vietnam
