= Jamiul Azhar Mosque =

Mosque in An Giang, Vietnam

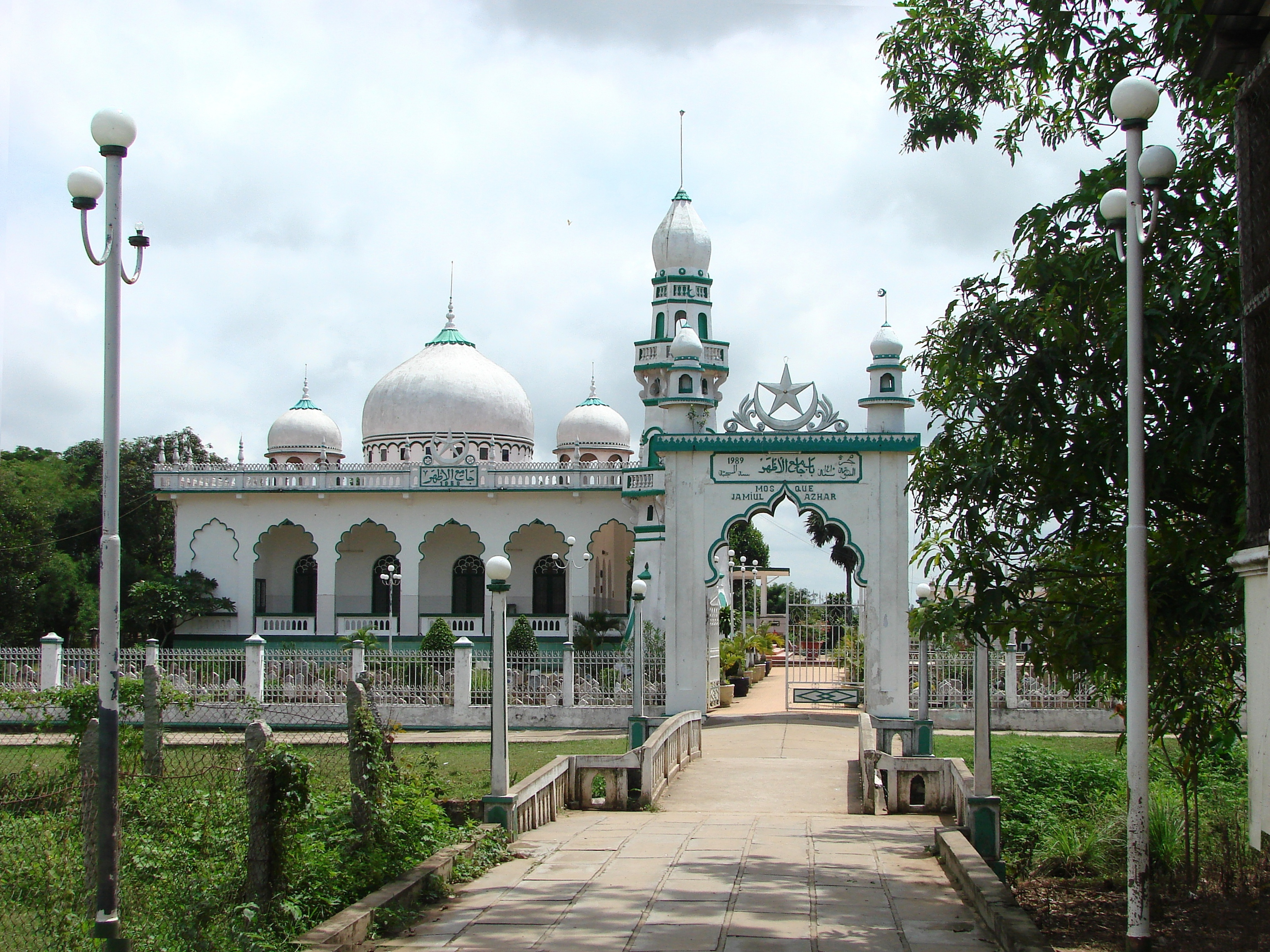

- Location within Vietnam

Religion
- Affiliation: Islam

Location
- Location: An Giang, Vietnam
- Interactive map of Jamiul Azhar Mosque
- Coordinates: 10°42′37.6″N 105°8′7.0″E

Architecture
- Type: mosque
- Established: 1959

The Jamiul Azhar Mosque is a mosque in An Giang Province, Vietnam.

== History ==
The mosque was established in 1959.

== Architecture ==
The mosque is decorated with various Islamic calligraphy. In front of the mosque also lies an Islamic cemetery.

== See also ==
- List of mosques in Vietnam
- Islam in Vietnam
