= Mubarkpur =

- Village
- Location in Punjab, India Mubarkpur (India)
- Coordinates: 31.1593299°N 76.1214293°E
- Country: India
- State: Punjab
- District: Shaheed Bhagat Singh Nagar

Government
  - Type: Panchayat raj
  - Body: Gram panchayat
- Elevation: 355 m (1,165 ft)

Population (2011)
  - Total: 1,797
- Sex ratio 894/853 ♂/♀

Languages
  - Official: Punjabi
- Time zone: UTC+5:30 (IST)
- PIN: 144514
- Telephone code: 01823
- ISO 3166 code: IN-PB
- Post office: Alachaur (B.O)
- Website: nawanshahr.nic.in

Mubarkpur is a village in Shaheed Bhagat Singh Nagar district of Punjab State, India. It is located 1.1 kilometres (0.68 mi) away from branch post office Alachaur, 6.4 kilometres (4.0 mi) from Nawanshahr, 14.7 kilometres (9.1 mi) from district headquarter Shaheed Bhagat Singh Nagar and 95.7 kilometres (59.5 mi) from state capital Chandigarh. The village is administrated by Sarpanch an elected representative of the village.

== Demography ==
As of 2011, Mubarkpur has a total number of 356 houses and a population of 1747, of which 894 are males while 853 are females, according to the report published by Census India in 2011. The literacy rate of Mubarkpur is 80.20% higher than the state average of 75.84%. The population of children under the age of 6 years is 186 which is 10.65% of total population of Mubarkpur, and child sex ratio is approximately 806 as compared to Punjab state average of 846.

Most of the people are from Schedule Caste which constitutes 60.79% of total population in Mubarkpur. The town does not have any Schedule Tribe population so far.

As per the report published by Census India in 2011, 504 people were engaged in work activities out of the total population of Mubarkpur which includes 482 males and 22 females. According to census survey report 2011, 97.82% workers describe their work as main work and 2.18% workers are involved in Marginal activity providing livelihood for less than 6 months.

== Education ==
KC Engineering College and Doaba Khalsa Trust Group Of Institutions are the nearest colleges. Industrial Training Institute for women (ITI Nawanshahr) is 6.9 kilometres (4.3 mi). The village is 77 kilometres (48 mi) away from Chandigarh University, 53 kilometres (33 mi) from Indian Institute of Technology and 47 kilometres (29 mi) away from Lovely Professional University.

List of schools nearby:

- Dashmesh Model School, Kahma
- Govt Primary School, Kahlon
- Govt High School, Garcha

== Transport ==
Nawanshahr train station is the nearest train station however, Garhshankar Junction railway station is 8.2 kilometres (5.1 mi) away from the village. Sahnewal Airport is the nearest domestic airport which located 61 kilometres (38 mi) away in Ludhiana and the nearest international airport is located in Chandigarh also Sri Guru Ram Dass Jee International Airport is the second nearest airport which is 154 kilometres (96 mi) away in Amritsar.

== See also ==
- List of villages in India
