= Mobarak, Iran =

Mobarak (Persian: مبارك), also rendered as Mubarak, in Iran may refer to:

- Mobarak, Isfahan
- Mobarak, Bafq, Yazd Province
- Mobarak, Taft, Yazd Province
