= List of mosques in Vietnam =

This is a list of mosques in Vietnam.

Name	Images	Location	Year/century	Remarks
Al Rahim Mosque		District 1, Ho Chi Minh City	1885	Mosque of the people of Malaysia and Indonesia
Al Noor Mosque		Hoàn Kiếm district, Hanoi	1885	
Al Ehsan Mosque		Châu Đốc, An Giang Province	1937	Mosque of Cham people
Hue Indian Mosque		Huế, Thừa Thiên Huế province	1921	Mosque of Hue people and Indian people
Jamiul Azhar Mosque		Tân Châu, An Giang Province	1959	
Jamiul Muslimin Mosque		Phú Nhuận, Hồ Chí Minh City	?	Indian Mosque
Mubarak Mosque		Phú Tân, An Giang Province	1750	
Saigon Central Mosque		District 1, Hồ Chí Minh City	1935	
Khoy Ri Yah Mosque		Nhơn Hội, An Giang Province	1992	

== See also ==
- Islam in Vietnam
- Lists of mosques
