= Mubarak Mosque (An Giang) =

Mosque in Phú Tân, An Giang, Vietnam

- Thánh đường Mubarak
- Location within Vietnam

Religion
- Affiliation: Islam

Location
- Location: Phú Tân, An Giang, Vietnam
- Interactive map of Mubarak Mosque
- Coordinates: 10°42′36.5″N 105°07′43.2″E

Architecture
- Type: mosque
- Completed: 1750

The Mubarak Mosque (Vietnamese: Thánh đường Mubarak) is a mosque in Phú Tân District of An Giang Province, Vietnam. It is said to be built in 1750 and renovated in 1808. It is one of the oldest mosques of the Muslim community of Cham people.

== See also ==
- List of mosques in Vietnam
- Islam in Vietnam
