= Mobarakabad, Kerman =

Mobarakabad مبارک‌آباد
- Village
- Location within Iran
- Coordinates: 28°49′33″N 58°52′40″E
- Country: Iran
- Province: Kerman
- County: Fahraj
- Bakhsh: Central
- Rural District: Borj-e Akram

Population (2006)
  - Total: 221
- Time zone: UTC+3:30 (IRST)
  - Summer (DST): UTC+4:30 (IRDT)

Mobarakabad (Persian: مبارک‌آباد, also Romanized as Mobārakābād) is a village in Borj-e Akram Rural District, in the Central District of Fahraj County, Kerman Province, Iran. At the 2006 census, its population was 221, in 63 families.
