= Mobarakeh, Bardsir =

Mobarakeh مباركه
- Village
- Location within Iran
- Coordinates: 29°55′21″N 56°37′58″E
- Country: Iran
- Province: Kerman
- County: Bardsir
- Bakhsh: Central
- Rural District: Mashiz

Population (2006)
  - Total: 173
- Time zone: UTC+3:30 (IRST)
  - Summer (DST): UTC+4:30 (IRDT)

Mobarakeh (Persian: مباركه, also Romanized as Mobārakeh) is a village in Mashiz Rural District, in the Central District of Bardsir County, Kerman Province, Iran. At the 2006 census, its population was 173, in 41 families.
