= Mobarakeh, Sirjan =

Mobarakeh مباركه
- Village
- Location within Iran
- Coordinates: 29°30′40″N 55°33′13″E
- Country: Iran
- Province: Kerman
- County: Sirjan
- Bakhsh: Central
- Rural District: Mahmudabad-e Seyyed

Population (2006)
  - Total: 210
- Time zone: UTC+3:30 (IRST)
  - Summer (DST): UTC+4:30 (IRDT)

Mobarakeh (Persian: مباركه, also Romanized as Mobārakeh) is a village in Mahmudabad-e Seyyed Rural District, in the Central District of Sirjan County, Kerman Province, Iran. At the 2006 census, its population was 210, in 48 families.
