= Mobarakabad, Malayer =

Mobarakabad مبارک‌آباد
- Village
- Location within Iran
- Coordinates: 34°24′16″N 48°39′51″E
- Country: Iran
- Province: Hamadan
- County: Malayer
- Bakhsh: Jowkar
- Rural District: Jowkar

Population (2006)
  - Total: 81
- Time zone: UTC+3:30 (IRST)
  - Summer (DST): UTC+4:30 (IRDT)

Mobarakabad (Persian: مبارک‌آباد, also Romanized as Mobārakābād) is a village in Jowkar Rural District, Jowkar District, Malayer County, Hamadan Province, Iran. At the 2006 census, its population was 81, in 23 families.
