= Mobarakabad, Kurdistan =

Mobarakabad مبارک‌آباد
- Village
- Location within Iran
- Coordinates: 35°44′32″N 47°13′56″E
- Country: Iran
- Province: Kurdistan
- County: Bijar
- Bakhsh: Central
- Rural District: Najafabad

Population (2006)
  - Total: 51
- Time zone: UTC+3:30 (IRST)
  - Summer (DST): UTC+4:30 (IRDT)

Mobarakabad (Persian: مبارک‌آباد, also Romanized as Mobārakābād) is a village in Najafabad Rural District, in the Central District of Bijar County, Kurdistan Province, Iran. At the 2006 census, its population was 51, in 14 families. The village is populated by Kurds.
