= Mobarakeh, Sepidan =

Mobarakeh مباركه
- Village
- Location within Iran
- Coordinates: 29°58′58″N 52°22′51″E
- Country: Iran
- Province: Fars
- County: Sepidan
- Bakhsh: Beyza
- Rural District: Beyza

Population (2006)
  - Total: 180
- Time zone: UTC+3:30 (IRST)
  - Summer (DST): UTC+4:30 (IRDT)

Mobarakeh (Persian: مباركه, also Romanized as Mobārakeh; also known as Mobārak Shāh and Mubārakshāh) is a village in Beyza Rural District, Beyza District, Sepidan County, Fars province, Iran. At the 2006 census, its population was 180, in 46 families.
