= Mebarak =

Mebarak is a surname. Notable people with the surname include:

- Shakira Mebarak (born 1977), Colombian singer-songwriter, generally known mononymously as Shakira
- Jade Mebarak, fictional character on the Telemundo television series El Clon

== See also ==
- Mubarak (name)
