= Alachaur =

- Village
- Location in Punjab, India Alachaur (India)
- Coordinates: 31.1602121°N 76.124902°E
- Country: India
- State: Punjab
- District: Shaheed Bhagat Singh Nagar

Government
  - Type: Panchayat raj
  - Body: Gram panchayat
- Elevation: 254 m (833 ft)

Population (2011)
  - Total: 1,218
- Sex ratio 596/622 ♂/♀

Languages
  - Official: Punjabi
- Time zone: UTC+5:30 (IST)
- PIN: 144514
- Telephone code: 01823
- ISO 3166 code: IN-PB
- Post office: Nawanshahar
- Website: nawanshahr.nic.in

Alachaur or Allachaur is a village in Shaheed Bhagat Singh Nagar district of Punjab State, India. It is located 4 kilometres (2.5 mi) away from postal head office and district headquarter Shaheed Bhagat Singh Nagar, 6 kilometres (3.7 mi) from Garhshankar, 38 kilometres (24 mi) from Phagwara and 93 kilometres (58 mi) from state capital Chandigarh. Most of the families of the village are well settled in abroad. The village is administrated by Sarpanch an elected representative of the village.

== Demography ==
As of 2011, Alachaur has a total number of 263 houses and a population of 1218 of which 596 include are males while 622 are females according to the report published by Census India in 2011. The literacy rate of Alachaur is 84.47%, higher than the state average of 75.84%. The population of children under the age of 6 years is 117 which is 9.61% of total population of Alachaur, and child sex ratio is approximately 857 as compared to Punjab state average of 846.

Most of the people are from Schedule Caste which constitutes 23.65% of total population in Alachaur. The town does not have any Schedule Tribe population so far.

As per the report published by Census India in 2011, 328 people were engaged in work activities out of the total population of Alachaur which includes 278 males and 50 females. According to census survey report 2011, 94.82% workers describe their work as main work and 5.18% workers are involved in Marginal activity providing livelihood for less than 6 months.

== Education ==
The village has a Punjabi medium, co-ed government high school. The schools provide mid-day meal as per Indian Midday Meal Scheme. The school provide free education to children between the ages of 6 and 14 as per Right of Children to Free and Compulsory Education Act. KC Engineering College and Doaba Khalsa Trust Group Of Institutions are the nearest colleges. Industrial Training Institute for women (ITI Nawanshahr) is 5 kilometres (3.1 mi) away from the village.

== Landmarks ==
Gurudawara Akal Bunga, Gurudwara Sahib and Khanga Peer are religious sites in the village. A religious fair held at the Gurdwara annually, which attended by people of all religions.

== Transport ==
Nawanshahr railway station is the nearest train station however, Garhshankar Junction railway station is 8.2 kilometres (5.1 mi) away from the village. Sahnewal Airport is the nearest domestic airport which located 60 kilometres (37 mi) away in Ludhiana and the nearest international airport is located in Chandigarh also Sri Guru Ram Dass Jee International Airport is the second nearest airport which is 156 kilometres (97 mi) away in Amritsar.

== See also ==
- List of villages in India
