= Mobarakabad, Shaft =

Mobarakabad مبارک‌آباد
- Village
- Location within Iran
- Coordinates: 37°04′06″N 49°24′40″E
- Country: Iran
- Province: Gilan
- County: Shaft
- Bakhsh: Ahmadsargurab
- Rural District: Chubar

Population (2006)
  - Total: 297
- Time zone: UTC+3:30 (IRST)
  - Summer (DST): UTC+4:30 (IRDT)

Mobarakabad (Persian: مبارک‌آباد, also Romanized as Mobārakābād) is a village in Chubar Rural District, Ahmadsargurab District, Shaft County, Gilan Province, Iran. At the 2006 census, its population was 297, in 94 families.
