= Mobarakabad-e Sepidar =

Mobarakabad-e Sepidar ممبارک‌آباد سپیدار
- Village
- Country: Iran
- Province: Kurdistan
- County: Sarvabad
- Bakhsh: Central
- Rural District: Kusalan

Population (2006)
  - Total: 283
- Time zone: UTC+3:30 (IRST)
  - Summer (DST): UTC+4:30 (IRDT)

Mobarakabad-e Sepidar (Persian: مبارک‌آباد سپیدار, also Romanized as Mobārakābād-e Sepīdār) is a village in Kusalan Rural District, in the Central District of Sarvabad County, Kurdistan Province, Iran. At the 2006 census, its population was 283, in 61 families. The village is populated by Kurds.
