= Mobarakeh, Taft =

Mobarakeh مباركه
- Village
- Location within Iran
- Coordinates: 31°46′21″N 54°14′48″E
- Country: Iran
- Province: Yazd
- County: Taft
- Bakhsh: Central
- Rural District: Pishkuh

Population (2006)
  - Total: 57
- Time zone: UTC+3:30 (IRST)
  - Summer (DST): UTC+4:30 (IRDT)

Mobarakeh (Persian: مباركه, also Romanized as Mobārakeh; also known as Mobārak and Mubārak) is a village in Pishkuh Rural District, in the Central District of Taft County, Yazd Province, Iran. At the 2006 census, its population was 57, in 20 families.
