= Mobarakeh, Bafq =

Village in Yazd province, Iran

Mobarakeh Persian: مباركه
- Village
- Location within Iran
- Coordinates: 31°37′26″N 55°26′18″E
- Country: Iran
- Province: Yazd
- County: Bafq
- District: Central
- Rural District: Mobarakeh

Population (2016)
  - Total: 3,301
- Time zone: UTC+3:30 (IRST)

Mobarakeh (Persian: مباركه) (Note: Also romanized as Mobārakeh; also known as Mobārak, Mobarakeh Bafgh, and Mubārak) is a village in, and the capital of, Mobarakeh Rural District of the Central District of Bafq County, Yazd province, Iran.

== Demographics ==
=== Population ===
At the time of the 2006 National Census, the village's population was 2,417 in 657 households. The following census in 2011 counted 2,762 people in 836 households. The 2016 census measured the population of the village as 3,301 people in 967 households. It was the most populous village in its rural district.
