= Hoàn Kiếm =

Capital and ward of Hanoi, Vietnam

Hoàn Kiếm Ward Phường Hoàn Kiếm
- Ward (Class-II)
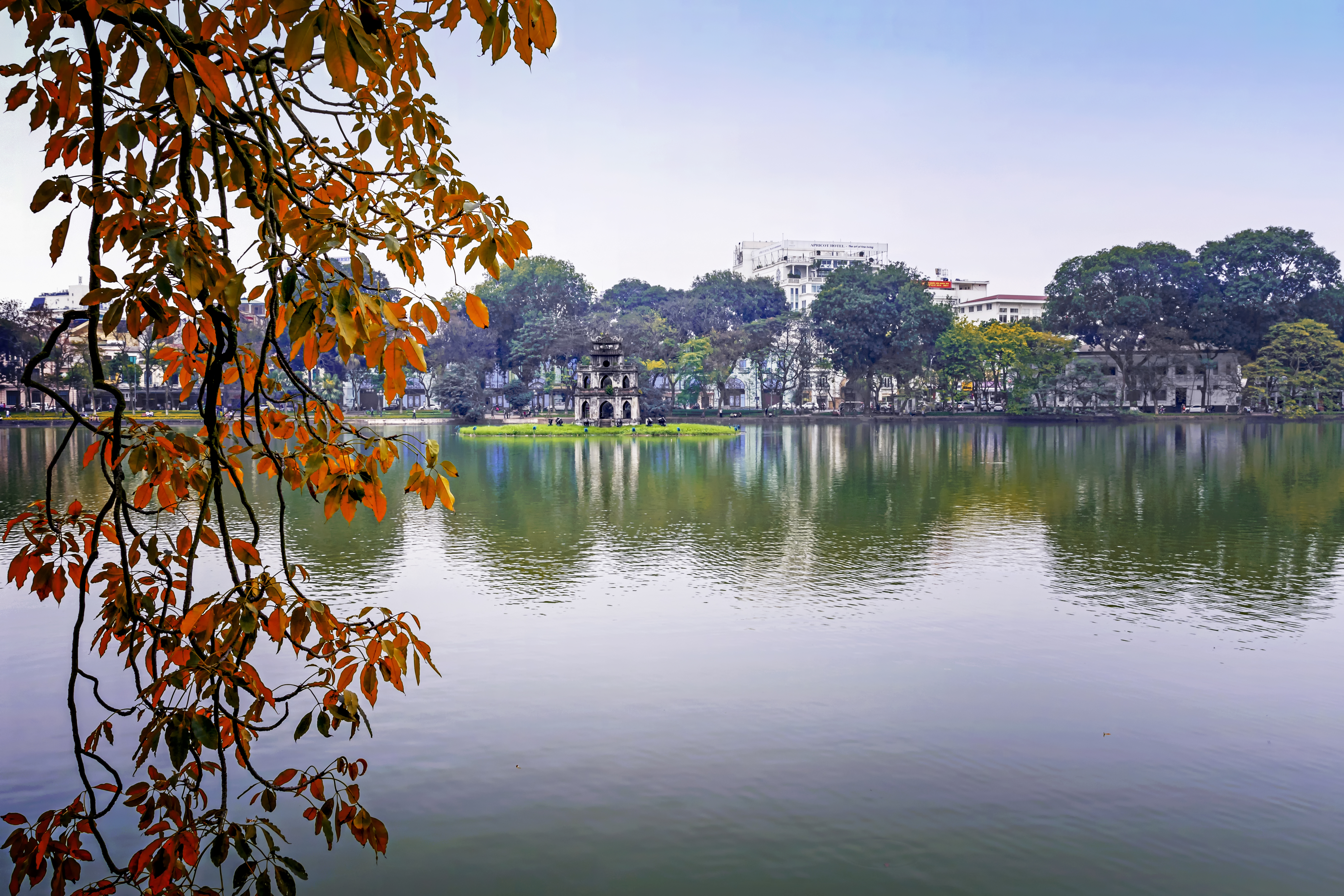
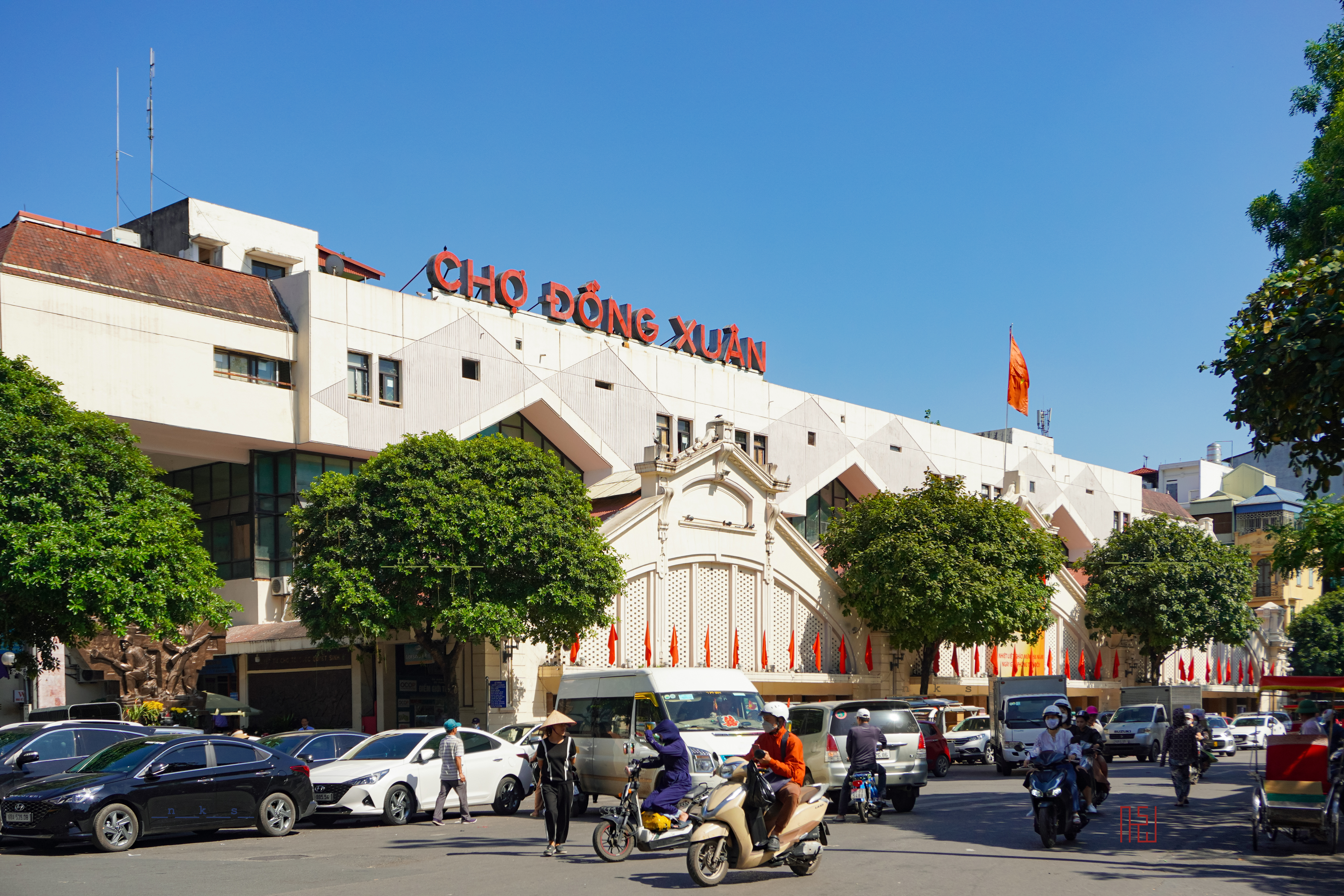
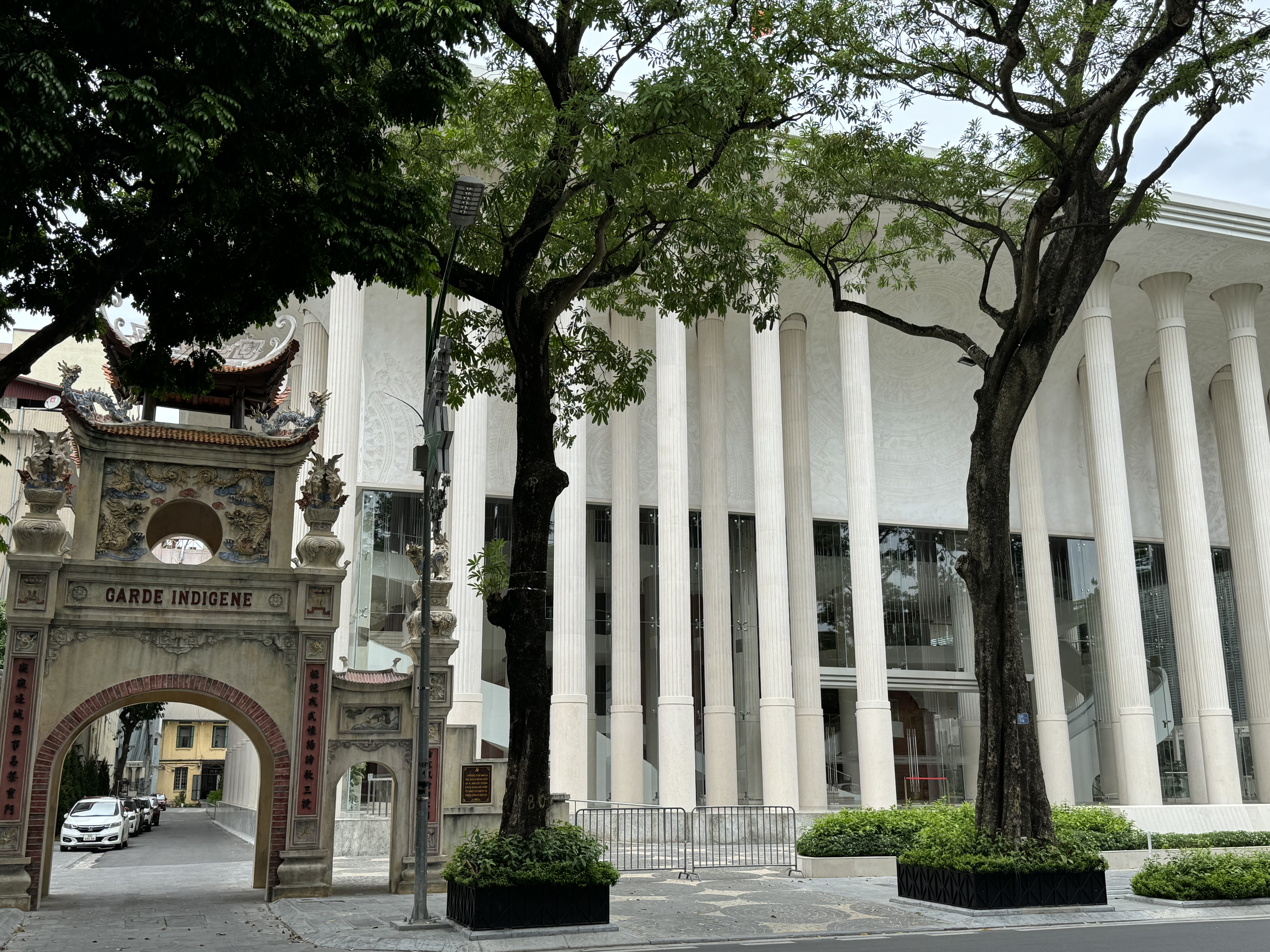
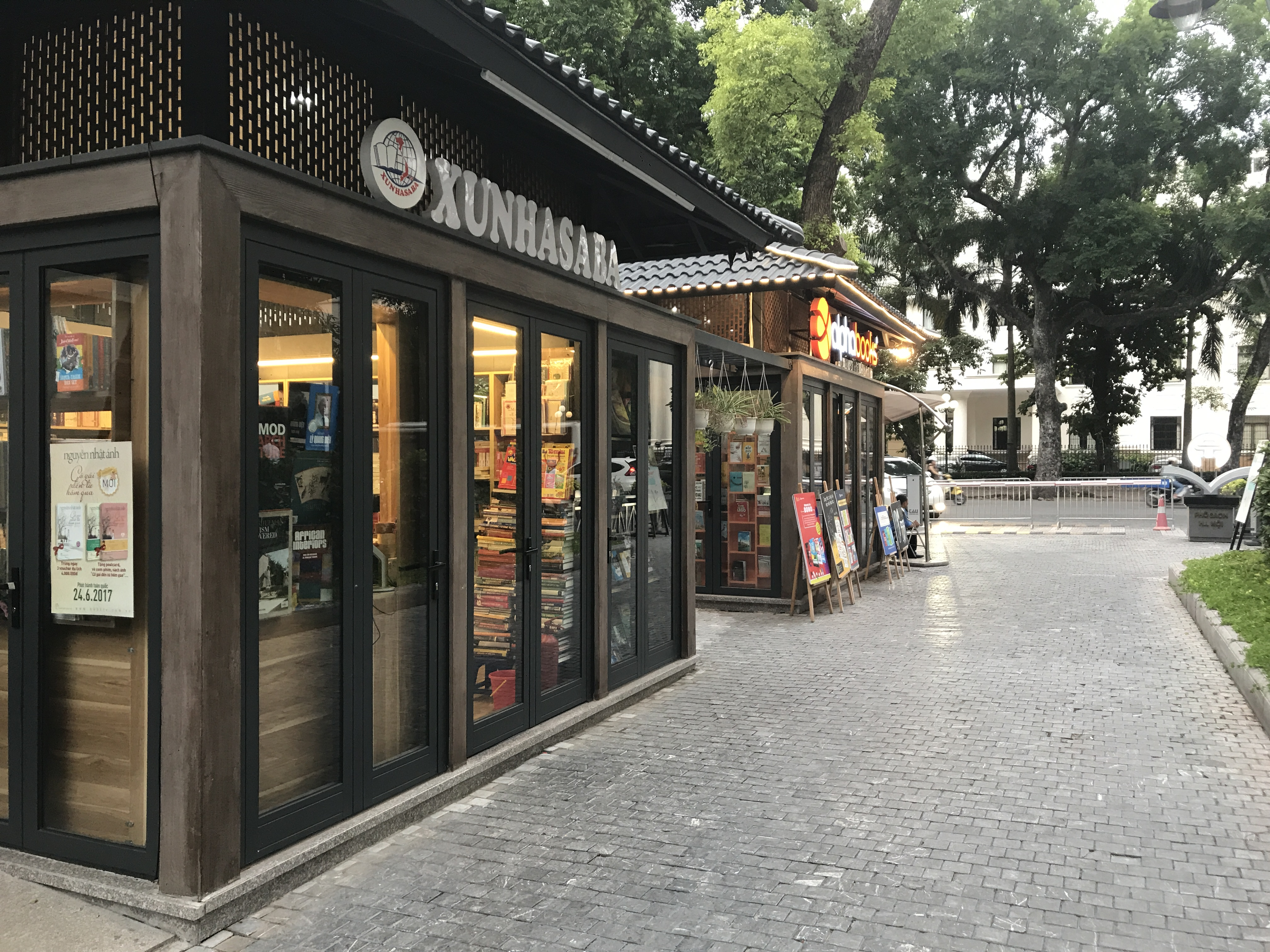
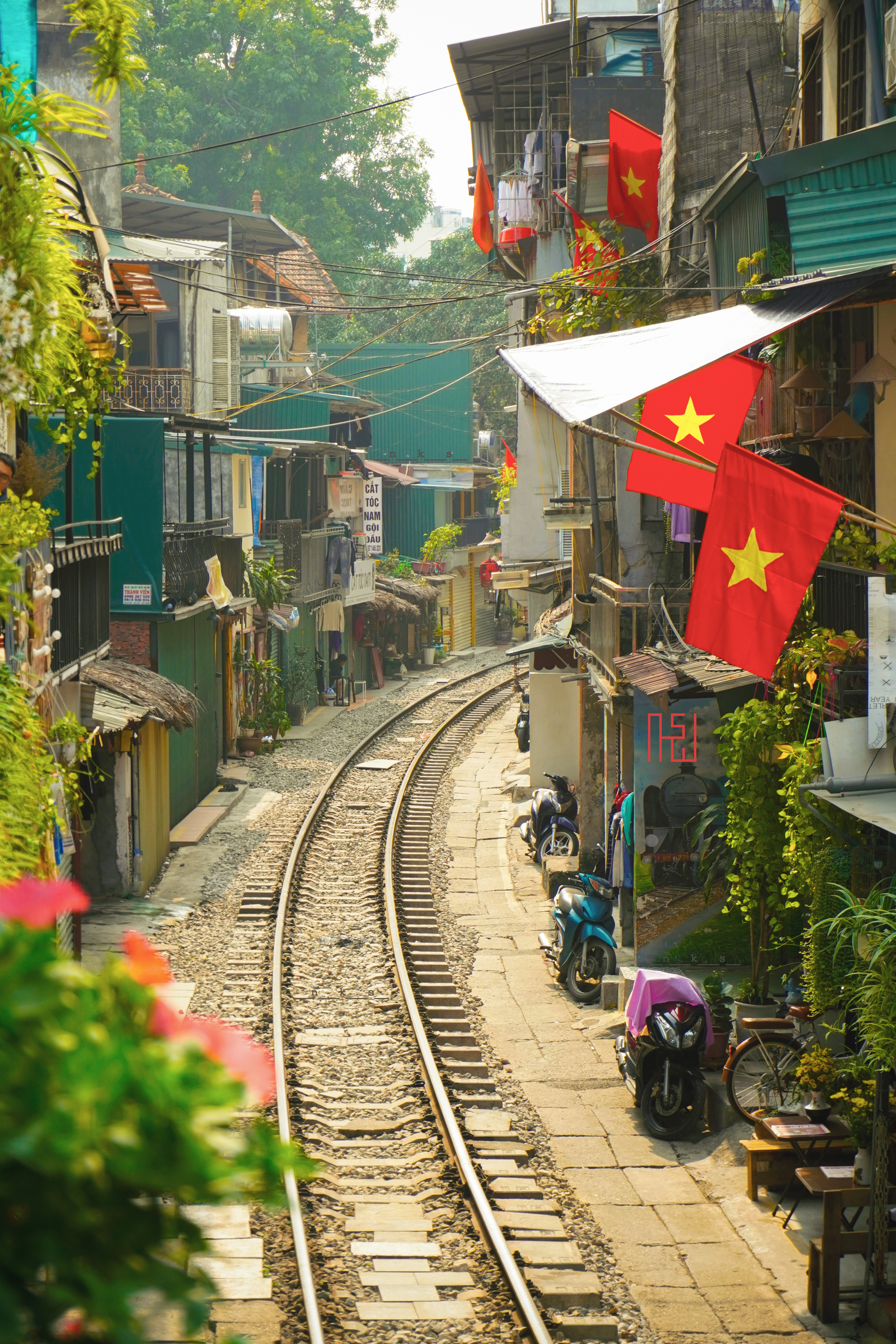
- From top, left to right : Hoàn Kiếm Lake, Đồng Xuân Market, Hồ Gươm Opera House, Đinh Lễ Book Street, and Train Track Coffee.
- Interactive map of Hoàn Kiếm Ward
- Location within Vietnam
- Country: Vietnam
- Region: Red River Delta
- Municipality: Hà Nội
- Establishment: April 29, 2025 (ward)
- Central hall: No.126, Hàng Trống Street, Hoàn Kiếm Ward

Government
  - Type: Ward-level authority
  - People Committee's Chairman: Trịnh Hoàng Tùng
  - People Council's chairman: Vũ Đăng Định
  - Front Committee's chairman: Nguyễn Thị Ngọc Anh
  - Party Committee's Secretary: Vũ Đăng Định

Area
  - Total: 1.91 km^{2} (0.74 sq mi)

Population (July 1, 2025)
  - Total: 105,301
  - Density: 55,100/km^{2} (143,000/sq mi)
  - Ethnicities: Kinh; Tanka; Others
- Time zone: UTC+7 (Indochina Time)
- ZIP code: 10000–11000 (Note: An official code from December 31, 2023, to present.)
- Climate: Cwa
- Website: Hoankiem.Hanoi.gov.vn; Hoankiem.Hanoi.dcs.vn

Hoàn Kiếm [hwa̤ːn˨˩:kiəm˧˥] is a administrative center of Hanoi, the capital of Vietnam.

== History ==
During the battle of Hanoi (1946), the entire eastern part of the Old Quarter has been named Inter-Zone 1 and acted like a military regiment. Two of the clashes were at Hàng Khay Street and the Hanoi Post Office, together in December.

To meet urgent needs of the plan to arrange and merge administrative units by the Government of Vietnam, the Hanoi City People's Council met on April 29, 2025, to approve Resolution 19/NQ-HĐND on approving the policy of re-arranging commune+ward-level administrative units of the whole Hanoi City. According to Article 1st of this dispatch, Hoàn Kiếm Urban District has been officially dissolved. From that facility, the entire area and population of that administrative unit has been converted into four ward-level ones, including as Ba Đình, Cửa Nam, Hoàn Kiếm, and Ngọc Hà.

Hoàn Kiếm Ward has been formed on the merger of some localities of former Hoàn Kiếm District, specifically as follows :

- All old wards Hàng Bạc, Hàng Bồ, Hàng Buồm, Hàng Gai, Hàng Mã, and Lý Thái Tổ from Hoàn Kiếm Dist.
- Most old wards Cửa Đông, Đồng Xuân, Hàng Bông, Hàng Trống, and Tràng Tiền from still Hoàn Kiếm.
- Part of Cửa Nam Ward from Hoàn Kiếm and former Điện Biên Ward from Ba Đình Dist.

Overall, its name has been decided by the Hanoi City People's Committee to preserve the administrative, commercial, cultural, and political advantages of the former district.
