= Islam in Vietnam =

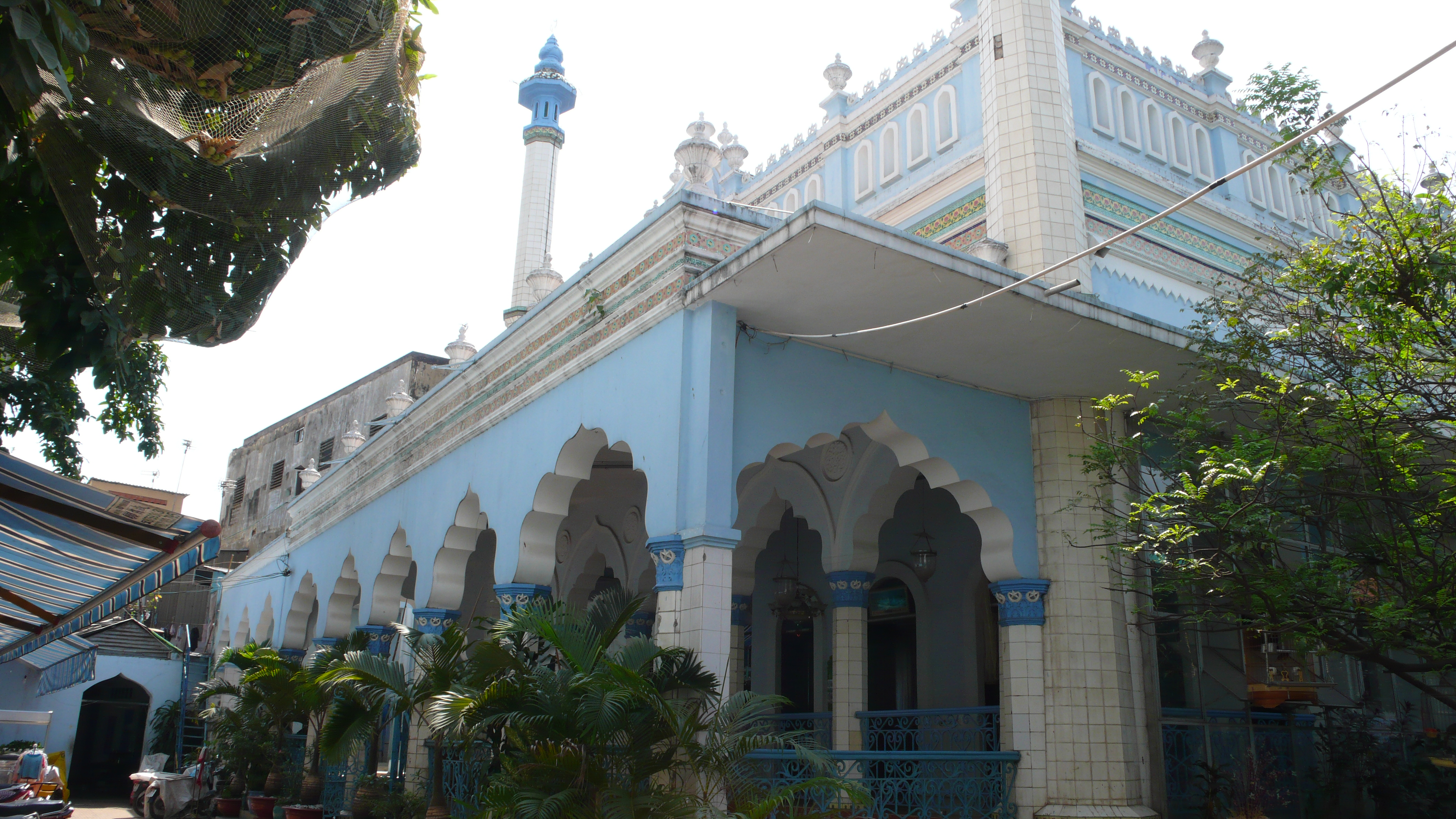
Jamia Mosque in Ho Chi Minh City

Islam in Vietnam is primarily associated with the Cham people, an Austronesian minority ethnic group, roughly one-third of Muslims in Vietnam are of other ethnic groups. There is also a community which describes itself as of mixed ethnic origins that also practices Islam and, on some occasions, describes themselves as the Cham, or Cham Muslims, in southern Vietnam, mostly around the region of Châu Đốc or Ho Chi Minh City.

== History ==
=== Spread of Islam (750–1400) ===
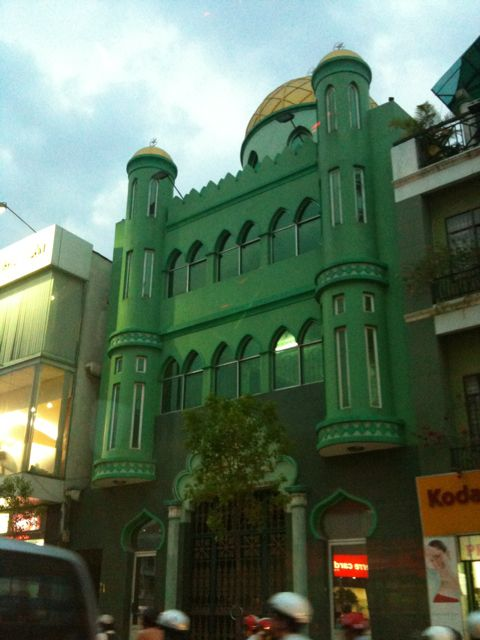
Jamiul Muslimin Mosque, Ho Chi Minh City

Uthman ibn Affan, the third caliph of Islam, sent the first official Muslim envoy to the Tang dynasty in China in the Yonghui period (650–655). Seafaring Muslim traders were known to make stops at ports in the Champa Kingdom en route to China very early in the history of Islam. During the 9th to 12th centuries, various medieval Arabic geographical works identified modern-day eastern Indochina as the lands of the Qimar (Khmer, Cambodians), the Sanf (Cham), and the Luqin (Vietnamese). Arab Muslim merchants reached Luqin (Hanoi) while Vietnam was under Tang China's rule. Luqin (Hanoi in northern Vietnam) was home to one of the largest Muslim communities in Vietnam when Vietnam was ruled by Tang China.

The earliest known material evidence of the continued spread of Islam is Song dynasty–era documents from China, which record that the Cham began converting to Islam in the late 10th and early 11th centuries. Following the usurpation of Lưu Kế Tông (r. 986–989), many Chams and Muslims sought refuge in China. The Song dynastic records state that in 986, hundreds of people from Champa, led by Pu Bo E (Abu Nurs), arrived in Hainan. In the next two years, nearly 500 refugees from Champa arrived at Canton, headed by Li Ning Bian and Hu Xuan (Hussain), who "demanded the protection of China".

Simultaneously, during the Mongol invasions of Vietnam, a notable presence of Muslim generals emerged among the Mongol ranks. Figures like Omar Nasr al-Din held sway, and a significant portion of the invading Mongol army in both Đại Việt and Champa consisted of Muslim Turks and Persians. During their short conquest, the Mongols managed to spread Islam, although it was never large enough to challenge the Vietnamese. During a visit to Champa in the 1340s, Ibn Battuta described a princess who met him, spoke in Turkish, was literate in Arabic, and wrote out the Basmala in the presence of the visitor. However, Ibn Battuta did not consider Champa an Islamic state. The number of followers of Islam began to increase as contacts with the Sultanate of Malacca broadened in the wake of the 1471 collapse of the Champa Kingdom, but Islam would not become widespread among the Cham until the mid-17th century.

=== Origin of Islam in Champa ===
==== Origin of Shiite Bani ====
Islam first appears in early Cham texts as Asulam, as the Cham people still refer to it today. Bani Awal (Bini ralaoh, people of Allah) religion, a syncretic, localized version of Shi'a Islam, gained dominance in 17th-century Panduranga. The unspecified origin of Bani, as well as the coming of Islam to Champa, are still contested by researchers who need to interpret several sources and Cham folktales, and try to reconstruct the history of Islam in Champa, for that matter. Scholars like Antoine Cabaton and Pierre-Yves Manguin proposed two preliminary theories for the apostle of Islam to Champa: The first theory states that Islam could have been introduced by Arab, Persian, Indian merchants, scholars, and religious leaders, from the 10th to 14th century. This periodization makes some efficient sense because Champa has been well known by Middle East literature since the early medieval era, and the presence of Muslim communities in Champa is also attested by archaeology, medieval Perso-Arabic and Chinese geography texts.

For example, Al-Dimashqi claimed a story that after being expelled, a small portion of Alīds took refuge in Champa; these Muslim immigrants thereby spread Shi'a among the Cham, which perhaps eventually led to the synthesis of the Bani Awal religion. Two Kufic gravestones found in Phan Rang dating from 1038 to 1039 of an Arab Muslim merchant named Abu Kamil, who originated from Egypt, indicate a certain sort of reiterated autonomy of a mercantile Muslim community in the city-state of Panduranga, which was granted by a Cham king who understood their importance in commerce and trade. The Cham Bani have been suggested to be religious adherents of the Isma'ili sect of Shi'a traders in medieval Champa. The legendary king of Panduranga Po Ovlvah, who reigned from 1000 to 1036 in the Cham annals, and whose name is believed to be a Cham rendition of Allah.

The popular accounts mainly outside of Champa, from the Cham diasporas, assure that the Cham had been converted by either ʿAlī and his son Muḥammad ibn al-Ḥanafīyya. A comparative oral tradition from the Cambodian Cham communities also states "Lord ʿAlī had sent Muḥammad ibn al-Ḥanafīyya to Champa to teach Islam." Several related Cham tales such as Po Rasulak, Po Ali, and Po (Fāṭima) Phwatima seemingly narrate the connection between early medieval Champa and the Islamic world. These are testified in Cham Bani wedding ceremonies, in which the bride and groom's ceremonial names are the Cham representations of ʿAlī and Fāṭima. For instance, a Cham man in Kampong Cham province born in 1885 said that his genealogy began with Sayyid Mustafa, who claimed to be a descendant of ʿAlī. Sayyid Mustafa went to Phan Rang and taught Islam while learning Akhar Thar Cham script, then walked to Cambodia and taught Islam to the Cambodian Cham.

However, according to most historians, plausibly, the Cham only began converting to Islam en masse after the fall of Vijaya in 1471.

==== Contradictory narrative and Malay origin of Cham Islam ====
The second theory argues that Islam arrived in Champa through a later, shorter, indirect way from the Malays, is considered more convincing and valid. After the fall of Vijaya in 1471 to the 17th century during the Age of Exploration, global trade in early modern Southeast Asia experienced a booming upward trajectory. Anthony Reid explains that at the same time, the Portuguese and Spanish Christians had arrived in the region and carried out ambitious colonial conquests and trade dominance, provoking political associations among the Southeast Asian Muslims. Among them were the Cham diaspora of merchants, warriors, and refugees who had adopted the Islamic faith from the Malays through peaceful correlation, were operating commercial activities throughout Southeast Asia, and built a strong relationship with them. Those Cham Muslims then returned to their homeland and started preaching Islam to their fellow people by the 1500s.

Contacts between Islamic sultanates on the Indonesian Archipelago with Champa (Panduranga) increased during 15th and 16th centuries. Cham texts relate the introduction of Islam into Champa began with a princess of Makkah and two Malay princes from Kelantan who came to Champa to promote the messages of the Qur'an. When the princess returns to her homeland, her Cham lover feels unable to abandon his ancestors' religion and adopt Islam, so the second tale tells that the Cham king Po Rome (r. 1627–1651) conceived hybridization according to Cham custom to ensure interreligious harmony in Cham society upon the advice of the Malay princes. The Malay Sejarah Melayu (Malay Annals) made a reverse claim: the Cham are credited for the introduction and promotion of Islam to Java. In conclusion, Manguin attributes the Islamization of the Cham people to their active participation the regional maritime networks, and the Malay states and Malay traders, which also had a great impact on the process.

=== Flourishing period (1400–1800) ===
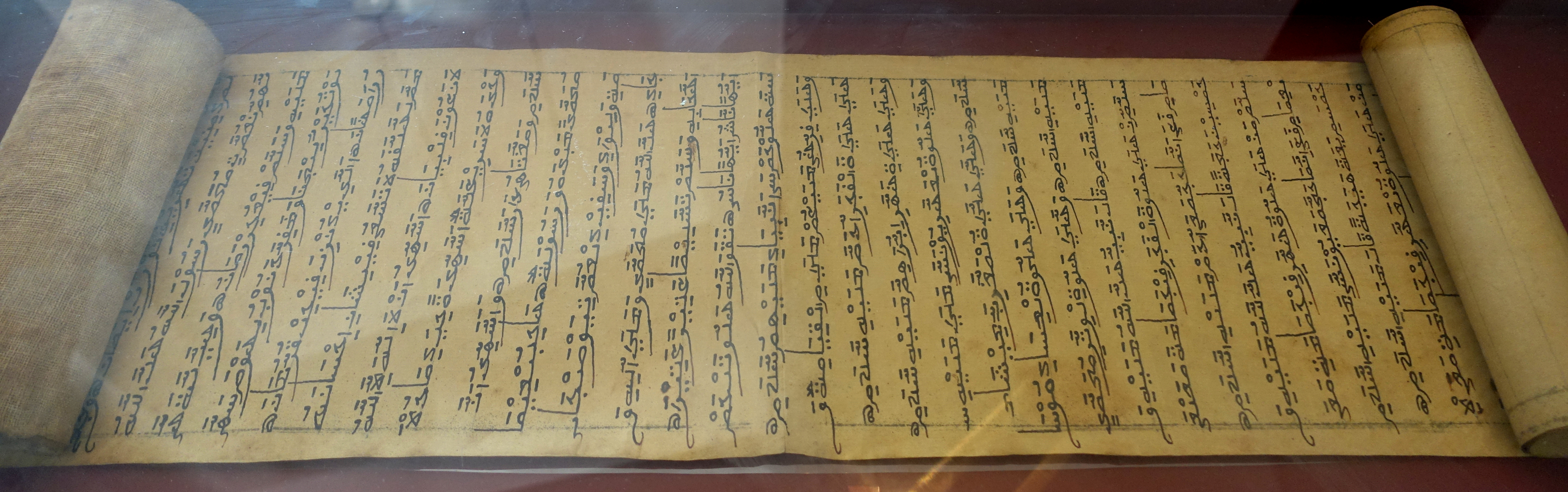
A Cham Qur'an scroll written in Cham variety of Arabic

A Spanish record in the late 1580s reported that "many Muslims live in Champa, whose Hindu king wanted Islam to be spoken and taught, resulted in many mosques existed along with Hindu temples". Many Cham Qur'an manuscripts and Bani legends were written during this period in Panduranga, for example, several Bani legends, the first relating to Fāṭima, daughter of the Prophet, and this is followed by an explanation of the origin of mosques, created by the Prophet Muhammad, ʿAlī, and the archangel Gabriel.

To resolve growing hatreds between the Balamon and the Bani Awal, King Po Rome ordered the Cham Bani to have their religion more integrated with Cham customs and beliefs, while pressing the Ahier to accept Allah as the most supreme God, but allowed them to retain their worship of traditional Cham divinities, excellently reforging peace and cohesion in his kingdom. Thus, it preserved the pre-Islamic Cham identity while entangling and incorporating Islam into the basis of Cham culture. King Po Rome is an important deity who is being venerated by the Cham people today. Connections between Pandaranga and the extra Malay/Islamic world blossomed. Syncretism was widely practiced at all levels, best known for incorporating cosmopolitan Islamic doctrines into existing indigenous Cham beliefs and Hindu pantheons. The Cham Bani developed a distinct Islamic literature, with a beckoned combination of more or less Arabic passages, including Islamic heroes and prophecies, cosmology, Islamization legends, Qur'anic verses, royal chronicles and genealogies, and Malay-Cham wordlists. The multipurpose lunisolar sakawi calendar, was likely Po Rome's best combination of the previous Cham Śaka era with the Islamic lunar calendar.

The Cham Bani blended Shi'a teachings and traditions with their own traditional Cham customs, such as keeping old Sanskrit titles among the clergy; the Ramadhan (Ramawan) month was reduced to a three-day-festival instead of the whole month; daily praying time was four hours and the last hour at night was skipped. Despite that, Bani Awal follows strict monotheism; Awal imam (acar) must perform praying (saemiang), rituals, and ordination only inside the mosque (magik, masjid). Cham Bani do not accept the worship altar of dead ancestors, nor the placement of deceased father and mother inside the house. Names of deceased persons are forbidden to be called directly. Instead, the Bani would remember them by calling slant names. The Bani would refurbish their ancestors' cemetery steles and have a remembrance ceremony to pay respect and filial piety to ancestors every year on the Gabur Rak day, which usually takes place at the end of the Šaʿbān (Shaban) month.

European missionaries described Champa in the 1670s as having the majority of its population being Muslims, a Muslim sultan, and a Muslim court. In 1680, Panduranga king Po Saut (r. 1659–1692) styled himself with the Malay honorific Paduka Seri Sultan in his handwritten letter to the Dutch in Java.

The Nguyen invaded Panduranga in the 1690s and locked the Cham polity in complete isolation, which resulted in the disconnection between the Cham and the Malay-Islamic world. By the early 1800s, the majority of Cham Muslims in Old Champa (Central Vietnam) were practicing Bani Shiism, still using the traditional Akhar Thrah Cham script. Meanwhile, the majority of Cambodian and Mekong Delta Chams became orthodox Sunni Muslims and adopted Arabic-derived Jawi script.

=== Persecution under Minh Mang ===
In 1832, the Vietnamese Emperor Minh Mạng annexed the last Champa Kingdom. Minh Mang outlawed Cham religions, both Bani and Balamon. Mosques were razed to the ground. Ramadan was forbidden. This resulted in the Cham Muslim leader Katip Sumat, who was educated in Kelantan, declaring a Jihad against the Vietnamese. The Vietnamese coercively fed lizard and pig meat to Cham Muslims and cow meat to Cham Hindus against their will to punish them and assimilate them into Vietnamese culture.

In the mid-19th century, many Cham Muslims emigrated from Cambodia and settled in the Mekong Delta region, further bolstering the presence of Islam in Vietnam. Between 1885 and 1890, Hanoi's only mosque, the Al-Noor Mosque on Hang Luoc Street, was built using contributions from the local Indian community. Malayan Islam began to have increasing influence on the Chams in the early 20th century especially with strengthening ties with Cham migrants setting roots in Kelantan. Religious publications were imported from Malaya; Malay clerics gave sermons in mosques in the Malay language; and some Cham people went to Malayan madrasah to further their studies of Islam. The Mekong Delta also saw the arrival of Malay Muslims.

=== World War II and Indochina War ===
Moroccans were among the hundred thousands of North Africans recruited into the French Far East Expeditionary Corps in the 1940s to fight in the Indochina War either voluntarily convinced with rewards or coerced; they however defected successfully by communication efforts of the Viet Minh. The Moroccan defectors stayed and intermarried with local Viet women concentrated in Ba Vì district, with their children largely unable to retain their Islamic faith until being escorted back home by the 1970s, which saw the resurgence of the Muslim faith.

=== Post-independence (since 1945) ===
As the Saigon (Republic of Vietnam, RVN) government seized minority lands for Northern Kinh refugees in the 1950s, nationalist sentiment among the Cham and indigenous peoples increased. Cham Muslims and Hindus formed the Cham Liberation Front (Front de Liberation du Champa, FLC) led by the Muslim Lieutenant-Colonel Les Kosem to fight against both North and South Vietnam during the Vietnam War in order to obtain Cham independence. The Cham Liberation Front joined with the Montagnards and Khmer Krom to form the United Front for the Liberation of Oppressed Races (Front Uni de Lutte des Races Opprimées, FULRO) to fight the Vietnamese.

During the 1960s and prior to 1975, a series of tensions and violent clashes between the Bani Awal and Cham Sunni broke out in Ninh Thuan and Binh Thuan. The problems were due to the efforts of the Cham Sunni to promote the more orthodox variety of Islam among the Bani, whom they regarded as not having upheld the true teachings of the Qur'an. The most notable and active organization for the efforts was the Hiệp hội Chàm Hồi giáo Việt Nam (Cham Muslim Association of Vietnam). One key component of the association was expanding ties between Cham Muslim communities with other Islamic countries, especially Malaysia, causing the new Socialist Republic of Vietnam's government to react with caution. Even after Vietnam rejoined Malaysia and Indonesia in ASEAN in 1995, the fear remains evident as state-sponsored historians downplay historical and cultural connections between Champa and the Malay/Islamic world.

After the 1976 establishment of the Socialist Republic of Vietnam, some of the 55,000 Cham Muslims emigrated to Malaysia. 1,750 were also accepted as immigrants by Yemen; most settled in Ta'izz. Those who remained did not suffer violent persecution, although some writers claim that their mosques were closed by the government. In 1981, foreign visitors to Vietnam were still permitted to speak to indigenous Muslims and pray alongside them, and a 1985 account described Ho Chi Minh City's Muslim community as being especially ethnically diverse: aside from Cham people, there were also Indonesians, Malays, Bangladeshis, Pakistanis, Yemenis, Omanis, and North Africans; their total numbers were roughly 10,000 at the time. In addition, during the time the Soviet and later Russian Armed Forces stationed their troops in Cam Ranh and more specifically, around Khánh Hòa province, a number of Muslim personnel, mostly from Central Asia (Kazakhs, Uzbeks, Tatars, Kyrgyz, Tajiks and Karakalpaks), as well as from the Caucasus and Crimea, worked there, forming a small clout of Central Asian communities that would later persist after the Russian departure in 2002; though the number rises slowly since 2010s with newcomers from mostly modern day's Russia, Ukraine, Kazakhstan, Kyrgyzstan and Uzbekistan.

Vietnam's second-largest mosque was opened in January 2006 in Xuân Lộc, Đồng Nai Province; its construction was partially funded by donations from Saudi Arabia and the United Arab Emirates, the latter has a strong tie to Vietnam. A new mosque, the largest in Vietnam, in An Giang Province, the Kahramanlar Rahmet Mosque, was opened in 2017 with Turkish funds.

According to the Cham advocacy group International Office of Champa (IOC-Champa) and Cham Muslim activist Khaleelah Porome, both Cham Hindus and Muslims have experienced religious and ethnic persecution and restrictions on their faith under the current Vietnamese government, with the Vietnamese state confiscating Cham property and forbidding Cham from observing their religious beliefs. In 2010 and 2013, several incidents occurred in Thành Tín and Phươc Nhơn villages where Cham were murdered by the Vietnamese. In 2012, Vietnamese police in Chau Giang village stormed into a Cham Mosque, stole the electric generator. Cham Muslims in the Mekong Delta have also been economically marginalised, with ethnic Vietnamese settling on land previously owned by Cham people with state support. Cham activist Suleiman Idres Bin called for independence of Champa from Vietnam and went as far as comparing its situation to East Timor.

== Demographics ==
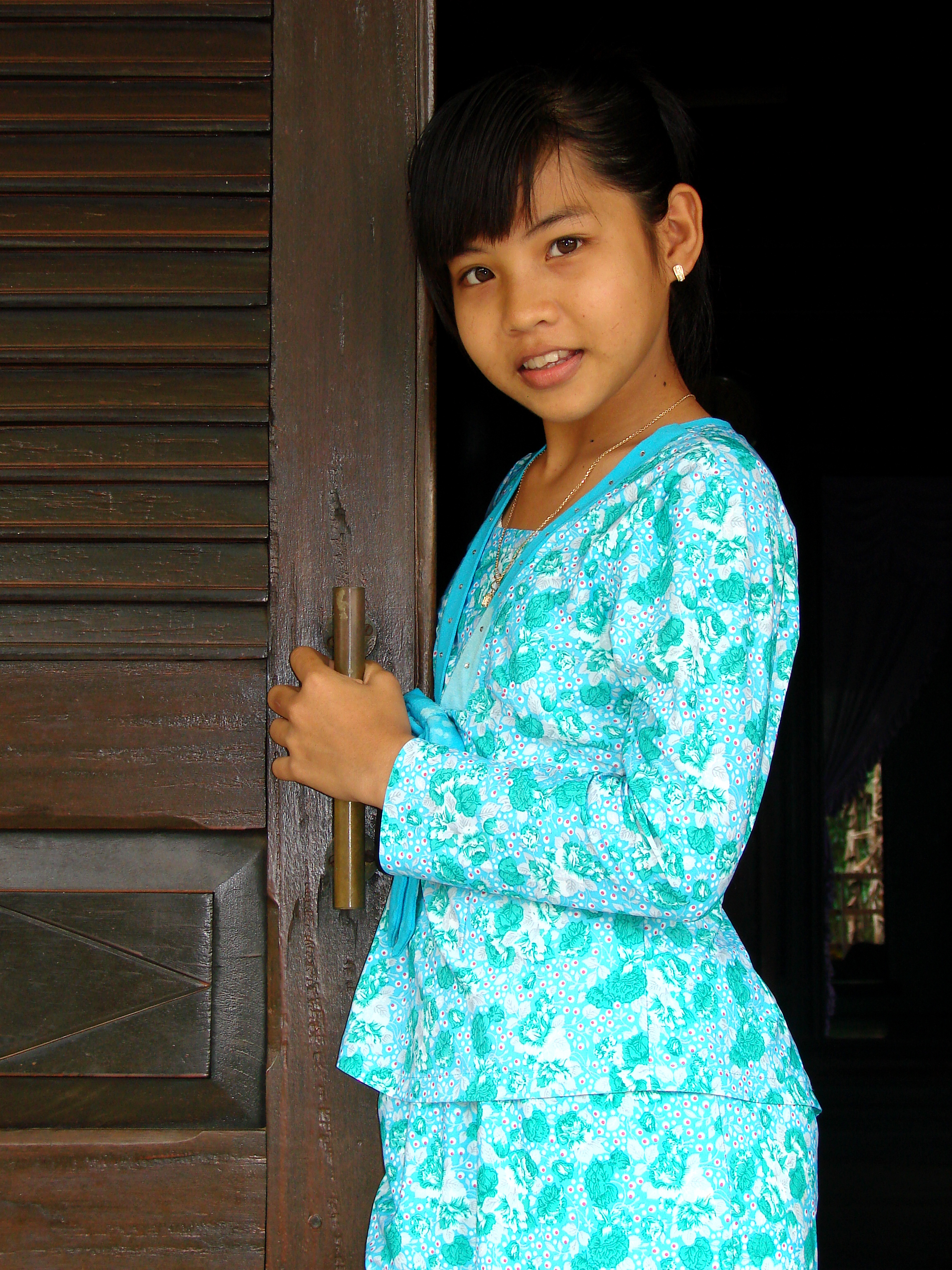
A Vietnamese Muslim girl.

Vietnam's April 1999 census reported 63,146 Muslims. Over 77% lived in the South Central Coast, with 34% in Ninh Thuận Province, 24% in Bình Thuận Province, and 9% in Ho Chi Minh City; another 22% lived in the Mekong Delta region, primarily in An Giang Province. Only 1% of Muslims lived in other regions of the country. The number of believers is gender-balanced to within 2% in every area of major concentration except An Giang, where the population of Muslim women is 7.5% larger than the population of Muslim men. This distribution is somewhat different from that observed in earlier reports. Prior to 1975, almost half of the Muslims in the country lived in the Mekong Delta, and as late as 1985, the Muslim community in Ho Chi Minh City was reported to consist of nearly 10,000 individuals. 200 to 300 Vietnamese Muslims also live in Hanoi, the capital of Vietnam, located in the north of the country. The only mosque in Hanoi is the Al-Noor Mosque, which accommodates about 200 people. Of the 54,775 members of the Muslim population over age 5, 13,516 (or 25%) were currently attending school, 26,134 (or 48%) had attended school in the past, and the remaining 15,121(or 27%) had never attended school, compared to 10% of the general population. This gives Muslims the second-highest rate of school non-attendance out of all religious groups in Vietnam (the highest rate being that for Protestants, at 34%). The school non-attendance rate was 22% for males and 32% for females. Muslims also had one of the lowest rates of university attendance, with less than 1% having attended any institution of higher learning, compared to just under 3% of the general population.

There are two Muslim groups in Vietnam: Sunni Muslims and Bani Cham Muslims. According to the 2019 Census released by Vietnam, the Muslim population in Vietnam is 70,934.

=== Bani Islam ===
The Bani branch is considered unorthodox because its practices are different from mainstream Islam and it is influenced by Cham folk beliefs. Cham Bani Muslims consisted entirely of ethnic Chams, particularly those living in the provinces of Ninh Thuận and Bình Thuận. The Bani community, which numbered around 64,000 and had 407 clerics (2006), is organized by the Bani Religious Leaders Council.

=== Sunni and Sufi Islam ===
The Sunni community has a wider range of ethnicities. Their population in 2006 was 25,000, mostly inhabiting the southwest of the Mekong Delta, along with urban areas such as Hanoi or Ho Chi Minh City. The majority of these people ranged between the Cham, Khmer, Malay, Minang, Viet, Chinese, Javanese and Arab people, all follow the mainstream Shafi'i school. Since the 1950s, there are already a group of lesser known Muslim population of Moroccan descent in Ba Vì, a legacy of Moroccan desertion from the French Army during the First Indochina War that carries the Maliki school to the country; today, most of them have been repatriated to Morocco, but there are still under-reported descendants of these Moroccans who practise Islam in Ba Vì today.

Recently, a growing number of newer Muslim migrants from Russia and Central Asia, mostly from Kyrgyzstan, Kazakhstan and Uzbekistan, have also established their presences in Nha Trang and, in a smaller scale, around Khánh Hòa province, mainly via tourist arrival but have also established various communities there, with some restaurants or organised families, mostly of Kazakh and Uzbek ethnicities. They also bring the practise of Hanafi school from Central Asia to the region.

However, there are esoteric, non-orthodox Islamic beliefs in the Mekong Delta that are regarded as mê tín (superstitions). Cham researcher Dohamide conjectures that these non-Islamic beliefs among the Mekong Delta Cham are Sufism. He believes that some fragments of the Mekong Delta Cham communities may be strongly influenced by Sufi orders.

== Official representation ==
The Ho Chi Minh City Muslim Representative Committee was founded in 1991 with seven members; a similar body was formed in An Giang Province in 2004.

== The Cham Muslim Identity in the Mekong Delta ==
There are two main groups of Chams practicing the Islamic faith in Vietnam: one in Central Vietnam, specifically in the Ninh Thuan and Binh Thuan provinces, corresponding to the territories of the ancient Champa kingdom. This group is commonly referred to as the Cham Bani. The other group is located in the southern Mekong Delta, with a population of around 64,000. The Cham Muslims of the Mekong Delta reside around the area of Châu Đốc in An Giang Province, close to the Cambodian border. They are also found in Ho Chi Minh City and the provinces of Đồng Nai and Tây Ninh, practicing the Sunni Muslim faith. The Cham Muslims in Vietnam's Mekong Delta assert their identity as unconfined by national boundaries but self-identify as an ethnic community with an emphasis on Islam. This enables them to transcend geographical boundaries and establish ties with co-religionists across borders. They are seen to engage in a cosmopolitan livelihood largely dependent on trade, with extensive extra-local networks that transcend national boundaries. A comprehensive study of this Cham group in Southern Vietnam can be found in Philip Taylor's book, Cham Muslims of the Mekong Delta: Place and Mobility in the Cosmopolitan Periphery (2007). The book explores in detail the Islamic Cham community in southern Vietnam, presenting their socio-cultural and socio-economic history based on extensive fieldwork conducted in the Mekong Delta from 1999 to 2005, including various interviews conducted with the local Chams in the Vietnamese language.

=== Origins and Religion ===
Islam has played a key role in the lives of the Muslim Chams of the Mekong Delta, not only as a religion, but also as a source of origin, a vital unifier in their self-identification as Chams. While some Chams agree with scholarly views of their ancient origins from the kingdom of Champa, many deny such ancestry and instead state a variety of origins in Islam itself, as well as Malaysia and Angkor, Cambodia. While this denial was viewed by scholars as a rejection of displacement and ancestral links to central Vietnam, fear of reprisal from host nations, and silence resulting from a traumatic past of guilt and persecution, as in the case of the Cambodian Chams, these pluralistic views might indeed point to the Chams as having diverse origins, which may, in turn, lie in the cosmopolitan creed of Islam that they have fervently embraced.

The Chams of the ancient Champa kingdoms along the south-central coast of Vietnam originally practiced Hinduism. Today, the Central Chams of Vietnam consistof two groups: the Balamon Chams, who practice an indigenized form of Hinduism, and the Bani Chams, who practice an indigenized form of Islam. Islam was introduced to these early Chams with the arrival of two waves of foreign Muslims on their shores: the first wave included being Arabs, Indians, Persians, and later Chinese Muslims beginning in the 9th century, and the second wave consisted of Malay Muslims in the 16th and 17th centuries when maritime trade flourished in Southeast Asia, with Muslim traders playing a significant role. Most historians recognized the presence of a "significant Muslim community among the indigenous Cham population" only after the fall of the Vijaya kingdom of Champa in 1471. The Chams have adopted Islam due to their disinclination for "genealogical identification" of these two groups, which led the Cham Muslims to move south.

For the Chams of the Delta, Islam's appeal lies in its universality and its ability to overcome various barriers of daily life. It provides a unifying relatability that transcends linguistic diversities and differing origins resulting from pluralistic migration, as experienced by these Chams. This drew them to adopt this faith. Scholars have also emphasized Islam as a means of reconsolidating displaced peoples, a result of missionary work, and as a transcendence creed more suitable for these Chams' mobile lifestyles engaging in extra-local trade. Traditional animism, in which local spirits are worshipped to seek protection, would not work for the southern Chams' situation. Their livelihoods involve constant movement and/or migration, where they would find themselves outside the protective sphere of their initial guardian spirits. In contrast, the God of monotheistic religions such as Islam provides universal protection to all those in His faith. Additionally, the Islamic faith provides traders with a "set of ethics applied to business practice and a disciplining code of conduct" that renders it more acceptable and appealing as compared to traditional spirit worship.

Islam also provides a means of accessing a wider world of co-religionists, as evidenced by the Chams' connections and affinity to Malaysia and the Middle Eastern world. Consequently, there has been an increasing emphasis among the Southern Chams on their Malay origins and migration. This emphasis may be a result of Malaysia's growing prosperity, its influence, and its recent interest in the "Malay Chams", considering the Chams as part of a broader Malay world. In this context, the Chams leverage their ethnicity and "their linguistic, cultural, and historical affinities" with neighboring countries to further their socio-economic interests. They also draw upon these affinities, "perceptions of oppression", and their "Muslimness" (Muslim identity) during interactions and negotiations, not only with Malays but also with the Khmer. Moreover, the Chams of the Mekong Delta maintain close kinship ties with the Chams in Cambodia, sharing a common religion, language, and trade links across many generations. Additionally, their resistance to ethnic minority status and the Vietnamese state's assimilation efforts, along with their extensive history of engagement with transnational cultural forces, have made the Muslim Chams inclined toward socio-cultural alignment with the larger Malay society. Islam, in this context, revitalizes and preserves their ethnic and cultural identity by providing access to better job opportunities and Islamic higher education within the broader Malay/Islamic world. The building of mosques in their communities serves as a vital landmark for Cham localities and reinforces their religious culture. Overall, Cham Muslim society exhibits fluidity and adaptability, constantly negotiating and transcending boundaries in their efforts to preserve their ethnic identity.

The Chams regard themselves as among the earlier settlers in the Mekong Delta region, in contrast to state narratives of the Vietnamese majority's expansion to the South. Historical French, Vietnamese, and Cham sources studied by Weber (2011) provide a vivid account of Cham and Malay military colonies created in the 18th century in Vietnam's southwestern provinces. The Chams and Malays from Cambodia were either migrated or displaced to the Tay Ninh and Chau Doc areas by the Vietnamese, with the purpose of establishing Viet-controlled settlements for frontier defense. After the dismantlement of the settlements, the French attempted to isolate these non-Viet and Vietnamese communities, which resulted in tensions arising between them. This sheds considerable light on the migratory cycle of the Chams over the centuries—both into and out of Cambodia—that Taylor (2007) alluded to. It also highlights the tensions that still exist today between the various ethnic groups of the Mekong Delta, offering an alternative view of the Chams as the "later arrivals".

=== The Cham Economic Life ===
The Cham Muslim communities in the Mekong Delta have generally been viewed as "poor" and "backward", residing in remote areas. They are physically isolated from the economic centers of the country, amidst a web of waterways, and socially distant from their neighbors due to their strict observance of religious practices. Additionally, they engage in a subsistence-oriented localist economy. Their relatively low education levels and minimal participation in the modern market economy, compared to other ethnic groups, have been thought to contribute to their economic situation. Their religious traditions have paradoxically been regarded as both hindering and assisting their engagement in trade. Despite the state's economic reforms and open-door market policies, they were not able to significantly improve the Cham's economic standing; instead, these measures further marginalized them. They were unable to participate in rice exports and large-scale rice farming due to falling rice prices and the loss of land following the state's land redistribution policies in the 1970s. Additionally, they could not engage in the emerging aquaculture business of fish-rearing due to a lack of capital. Furthermore, the traditional weaving industry became unsustainable for them as it could not compete with cheaper, mass-produced fabrics available in the market. As such, trade became the mainstay of the Cham economy.

Due to their settlements' geolocation, the Chams have engaged in trade across the Cambodia–Vietnam border for generations. They also participate in trans-local trade across the Mekong Delta, reaching as far as Central and North Vietnam, especially to areas untouched by the modern market. Their multilingual abilities and territorial knowledge play a crucial role in this trade. Some Chams can speak Vietnamese (the national lingua franca), Khmer, Malay, in addition to their native Cham language. Rather than conforming to the commonly held idea of ethnic minorities as isolated due to the remote situation of their communities, the Chams' nature actually points to their cosmopolitan character. Despite their cosmopolitan nature, the economic difficulties faced by the Chams mentioned above ironically contradict the state narratives of economic liberation enjoyed under its open market policies. While the Chams regard themselves as a disenfranchised group, the majority Kinh are considered to have better access to the state. While the Chams' continuous mobility and their outward migration to cities and overseas for higher education and better job opportunities have resulted in political agency for the Chams, it has also led to remittances benefiting local communities and reduced frictions with other ethnic groups.

=== The Cultural Dimension ===
While the matrilineal traditions once practiced by the Central Chams of Vietnam no longer persist among the Chams of the Mekong Delta, certain kinship practices are still shared between the two groups. These include monogamy and the post-marital matrilocal practice, where the man moves in with his bride's family following marriage. While the two groups also share a common Malayo-Polynesian Cham language that is mutually understandable, differences in pronunciation and accent do exist. However, the written Cham script derived from Sanskrit, known as the akhar thrah, is still maintained by the Central Chams in both its writing system and texts. Unfortunately, it has been lost among the Chams of the Mekong Delta. This leads the Central Chams to perceive their southern counterparts as having "lost their Cham culture". However, the Chams of the Delta do not perceive this as a deficiency. Instead, they use the Arabic alphabet for the written form of the Cham language. Additionally, many Chams—especially for Qur'anic studies—also learn Malay and Arabic. In the realm of religion, however, the Chams of the Delta regard themselves as practicing a "purer form" of Islam as compared to the Cham Banis in the north, who also worship ancestors and whose religious practices are seen to have Brahmanic influences.

The Chams have been portrayed in state cultural narratives as part of the broader cultural mosaic of ethnic minorities constituting Vietnam. However, they resist such monolithic views of their culture. From the perspective of the Cham Muslims in the Mekong Delta, the state tends to perceive Central Cham culture as representative of all Chams, emphasizing it as the minority ethnic Cham culture. Unfortunately, this approach overlooks the internal diversity within the Cham groups, leading to tensions among the Cham Muslims. While the state's reach into this southern delta region has been limited and contested, its portrayal of Cham culture as matrilineal and unchanging does not align with the fluid social and ideological exchanges that occur within the Cham Muslim communities of the Delta.

In this regard, there is a notable view that affirms Cham self-identification and questions the prevailing nation-state-bound classification of them as a minority. Photographic portrayals of Chams residing in Vietnam, Malaysia, and Hainan, China, not only in traditional settings performing cultural rituals or as modern professionals performing daily duties in their everyday lives, have been depicted as being themselves in their home environments. This portrays an aspect of the Chams differing from the common "folkloric depictions" of them as a "colourful and timeless" ethnic minority of a nation state. As such, "an alternative approach to belonging" is seen among the Chams where modern representations of the Cham reject ethnic objectification associated with the notion of backwardness. It is seen as such that "self-identification" is the best unifier of Chams across Vietnam, resisting common categorizations and portrayals of Cham ethnicity, where besides the common Cham language, little unites the Chams, especially given that not all Chams relate to ancestral origin narratives associated with the ancient Champa kingdom.

=== Cham Potency ===
Beliefs among the non-Cham Vietnamese population prevail of Cham potency through spiritual and occult powers, drawing continuity from the ancient Champa animistic and local spirit worship. The belief in Cham spiritual potency has thus added another dimension to the perceived identity of this ethnic group by non-Chams in Vietnam. The Vietnamese regard of Cham potency to the latter's perceived power and knowledge derived from their "privileged connection to the local area", and as imagined "weapons to overcome the deficits" of displacement, impoverishment, and disadvantage that they had suffered. The belief and worship in potent Cham spiritual figures and their origins in the Mekong Delta reveal aspects of being Cham- where fame and repute are derived from being trans-local and mobile, achieved through trade, religious studies, and pilgrimage, with a sense of "simultaneous belonging to local, trans-local and universal communities of faith", drawing a parallel to the sacred journeys undertaken to Mecca and the locale's perceived magical potency.

The Cham female spirits are venerated as the protectors of their respective localities, following the establishment of such cults by the Viet emperors who claimed to have been "assisted" by the spirits in their victories over Cham territories, and thus by co-opting Cham cultural elements into their territorial expansion, created a legitimacy narrative over the conquered Cham lands. By establishing "historical potency" and continuity, the Vietnamese engage in "remembering" the Chams as the first occupiers of the land. Through such "remembering", a form of cultural "compensation" is considered to be rendered towards the Chams. In this regard, ideological complexities are observed in the worship of the "Lady of the Realm" of the Mekong Delta, in which the multi-ethnic historical layers that undergird this region are reflected. The "Lady" Ba Chau Xu and her shrine in Chau Doc, near the Cambodian border, function as a "boundary-marker". According to official accounts, her legends relate to how she assisted the mandarin "Thoai Ngoc Hau" in defending Vietnamese territories. This co-opted the goddess into the Vietnamese pantheon and national defense narratives. Interestingly, the aspect of Vietnamese expansion into the previous Khmer territories has been reversed. This reversal is particularly notable given the archaeological attributes of the statue, which resemble a female likeness rather than that of the Khmer deity Shiva. Some locals believe the "Lady" to actually be the Cham goddess ‘’Thien Y A Na’’ or even of Indian origins, although in current times, it is increasingly being venerated by the local ethnic Chinese for her efficacy in fertility and business prosperity.

In this vein, a revival of ethnic spirit rituals in the post-Doi Moi era is seen to have taken place in Vietnam, where Daoist-inspired practices in which ethnic minorities are regarded as "contemporary ancestors" of the Vietnamese people, whose tutelary spirits safeguard their respective lands, had overtaken earlier neo-Confucian views of minorities being regarded as the "junior siblings" of the majority Vietnamese with notions of ethnic minorities as "mired in the past".

=== Conclusion ===
The Cham Muslims in the Mekong Delta of Vietnam have long established a community for themselves, centred on the Islamic religion and a way of life defined by Islamic values. The scholarship on Cham ethnicity discussed above portrays how, despite pluralistic accounts of origin and linguistic diversity, the Chams' self-identification as Muslims unifies the Chams not only across the Delta but also across national boundaries. State narratives of isolation and remoteness in relation to geographical situations of ethnic minorities are in paradox for the Chams of the Delta where cross-border networks of engagement, extra-local trade and religious connections attest instead to their cosmopolitanism. Assistance from the Cham Muslim diaspora across the globe, urban emigrations, followed by state efforts at infrastructure development, have also enabled them to exercise political agency as seen in higher education levels among the young, livelihoods bolstered by relatives' remittances. The Chams have also been able to utilise their religion in seeking support and recognition across co-regionalists in their pursuit of education and better opportunities beyond their localities which have contributed to the preservation of their identity and culture. The works of Taylor and other contemporary scholars as studied above portray the various means of Cham resistance to state assimilation efforts and to an ethnic minority status bounded by nation-state ideologies and categorisations that reaffirm self-identification as a unifying element, where despite the existence of traditional ritualistic beliefs, Islamic faith and cultural values bind the Muslim Chams of the Mekong Delta.

== See also ==
- Religion in Vietnam
- Islam in Southeast Asia
- Islam by country
- List of mosques in Vietnam
- Cham Islam
- Cham Bani
- Islam in Cambodia
