= Hashemabad =

Hashemabad (Persian: هاشم آباد), also rendered as Hashimabad, may refer to:

- Hashemabad, East Azerbaijan
- Hashemabad, Kharameh, Fars Province
- Hashemabad, Marvdasht, Fars Province
- Hashemabad, Golestan
- Hashemabad, Hormozgan
- Hashemabad, Ilam
- Hashemabad, Bon Rud, Isfahan County, Isfahan Province
- Hashemabad, Jolgeh, Isfahan County, Isfahan Province
- Hashemabad Air Force Base, Isfahan County, Isfahan Province
- Hashemabad, Nain, Isfahan Province
- Hashemabad, Kerman
- Hashemabad, Fahraj, Kerman Province
- Hashemabad, Shahr-e Babak, Kerman Province
- Hashemabad, Kermanshah
- Hashemabad, Lorestan
- Hashemabad, Chenaran, Razavi Khorasan Province
- Hashemabad, Mashhad, Razavi Khorasan Province
- Hashemabad, Zeberkhan, Nishapur County, Razavi Khorasan Province
- Hashemabad-e Soltani, Nishapur County, Razavi Khorasan Province
- Hashemabad, Sabzevar, Razavi Khorasan Province
- Hashemabad, Khash, Sistan and Baluchestan Province
- Hashemabad, West Azerbaijan
- Hashemabad, Chahak, Khatam County, Yazd Province
- Hashemabad, Fathabad, Khatam County, Yazd Province
- Hashemabad, Taft, Yazd Province
