= Bakhtiari =

Bakhtiari or Bakhtiyari (Persian: بختياري) may refer to:

== Places ==
- Bakhtiari, Fars, a village in Fars Province, Iran
- Bakhtiari, Yazd, a village in Yazd Province, Iran
- Chaharmahal and Bakhtiari Province, Iran
- Bakhtiari Dam, an arch dam under construction on the Bakhtiari River
- Bakhtiari River in Iran

== Other uses ==
- Bakhtiari (surname), list of people with the surname
- Bakhtiari dialect, spoken by Bakhtiari people
- Bakhtiari people, a tribe of Iran
- Bakhtiari rug, made by the Bakhtiari people

== See also ==
- Bakhtiyarli, a village in Azerbaijan
- Bakhtiar (disambiguation)
