= Tutak, Marvast =

Village in Yazd province, Iran

Tutak Persian: توتك
- Village
- Location within Iran
- Coordinates: 30°16′37″N 53°59′31″E
- Country: Iran
- Province: Yazd
- County: Marvast
- District: Isar
- Rural District: Tutak

Population (2016)
  - Total: 420
- Time zone: UTC+3:30 (IRST)

Tutak (Persian: توتك) (Note: Also romanized as Tūtak and Ţūţak) is a village in, and the capital of, Tutak Rural District of Isar District, Marvast County, Yazd province, Iran.

== Demographics ==
=== Population ===
At the time of the 2006 National Census, the village's population was 322 in 89 households, when it was in Isar Rural District of Marvast District (Note: Renamed the Central District of Marvast County) in Khatam County. The following census in 2011 counted 325 people in 92 households. The 2016 census measured the population of the village as 420 people in 118 households.

After the census, the district was separated from the county in the establishment of Marvast County and renamed the Central District. The rural district was transferred to the new Isar District, and Tutak was transferred to Tutak Rural District created in the district.
