= Bakhtiar =

Bakhtiar, Bakhtiyar, Bextiyar and other similar transliterations (Persian: بختیار) may refer to:

- Bakhtiar (name)
  - Title character of the Bakhtiyar-nama
- Bakhtiar (film), a 1955 Soviet comedy film
- Bakhtiar, Alborz, Iran
- Bakhteyar, Fars, Iran
- Bakhtiar, Bagh-e Malek, Khuzestan Province, Iran
- Bakhtiar, Izeh, Khuzestan Province, Iran
- Bakhtiar, Razavi Khorasan, Iran
- Bäxtiyar, Russia

== See also ==
- Bakhtiari (disambiguation)
- Bakhtiyarli, a ghost village in Qubadli Rayon, Azerbaijan
