= Shahriari =

Shahriari or Shariyari or Shahryari (Persian: شهرياری) may refer to:

== Places ==
- Shahriari, Chaharmahal and Bakhtiari, Iran
- Shahriari, Nik Shahr, Sistan and Baluchestan province, Iran
- Shahriari, Zabol, Sistan and Baluchestan province, Iran
- Shahriari Rural District (Kuhrang County), Chaharmahal and Bakhtiari province, Iran
- Shahriari Rural District (Khatam County), Yazd province, Iran
- Shahriari-ye Olya, Yazd province, Iran
- Shahriari-ye Sofla, Yazd province, Iran
- Shahriyari, Kerman, Iran

== People ==
- Behnam Shahriyari (died 2025), Iranian senior official in the IRGC
- Hamid Shahriari (born 1963), Iranian Twelver Shia cleric, general secretary of The World Forum for Proximity of Islamic Schools of Thought
- Majid Shahriari (1966–2010), Iranian nuclear scientist and physicist
- Shahriar Shahriari (born 1956), Iranian-American mathematician
