= Mobarakeh, Marvast =

Village in Yazd province, Iran

Mobarakeh Persian: مباركه
- Village
- Location within Iran
- Coordinates: 30°27′37″N 54°15′00″E
- Country: Iran
- Province: Yazd
- County: Marvast
- District: Central
- Rural District: Mobarakeh

Population (2016)
  - Total: 360
- Time zone: UTC+3:30 (IRST)

Mobarakeh (Persian: مباركه) (Note: Also romanized as Mobārakeh; also known as Mobādak, Mubādak, and Tabārakeh) is a village in, and the capital of, Mobarakeh Rural District of the Central District (Note: Formerly Marvast District of Khatam County) of Marvast County, Yazd province, Iran.

== Demographics ==
=== Population ===
At the time of the 2006 National Census, the village's population was 360 in 90 households, when it was in Harabarjan Rural District of Marvast District (Note: Renamed the Central District of Marvast County) in Khatam County. The following census in 2011 counted 361 people in 92 households. The 2016 census recorded a population of 360 people in 109 households.

After the census, the district was separated from the county with the establishment of Marvast County and was renamed the Central District. Mobarakeh was then transferred to the newly created Mobarakeh Rural District in the district.
