= Eslamabad-e Chah-e Manj =

Eslamabad-e Chah-e Manj اسلام ابادچاه منج
- Village
- Location within Iran
- Coordinates: 29°43′06″N 54°16′08″E
- Country: Iran
- Province: Yazd
- County: Khatam
- Bakhsh: Central
- Rural District: Chahak

Population (2006)
  - Total: 179
- Time zone: UTC+3:30 (IRST)
  - Summer (DST): UTC+4:30 (IRDT)

Eslamabad-e Chah-e Manj (Persian: اسلام ابادچاه منج, also Romanized as Eslāmābād-e Chāh-e Manj; also known as Eslāmābād) is a village in Chahak Rural District, in the Central District of Khatam County, Yazd Province, Iran. At the 2006 census, its population was 179, in 43 families.
