= Shahriari-ye Olya =

Village in Yazd province, Iran

Shahriari-ye Olya Persian: شهریاری علیا
- Village
- Location within Iran
- Coordinates: 29°41′10″N 54°18′53″E
- Country: Iran
- Province: Yazd
- County: Khatam
- District: Chahak
- Rural District: Shahriari

Population (2016)
  - Total: 708
- Time zone: UTC+3:30 (IRST)

Shahriari-ye Olya (Persian: شهریاری علیا) (Note: Also romanized as Shahrīārī-ye ‘Olya; also known as Shahrīyārī) is a village in, and the capital of, Shahriari Rural District of Chahak District of Khatam County, Yazd province, Iran.

== Demographics ==
=== Population ===
At the time of the 2006 National Census, the village's population was 575 in 132 households, when it was in Chahak Rural District of the Central District. The following census in 2011 counted 570 people in 154 households. The 2016 census measured the population of the village as 708 people in 192 households.

After the census, the rural district was separated from the district in the formation of Chahak District. Shahriari-ye Olya was transferred to Shahriari Rural District created in the new district.
