= Rezaabad, Khatam =

Rezaabad رضااباد
- Village
- Country: Iran
- Province: Yazd
- County: Khatam
- Bakhsh: Marvast
- Rural District: Isar

Population (2006)
  - Total: 75
- Time zone: UTC+3:30 (IRST)
  - Summer (DST): UTC+4:30 (IRDT)

Rezaabad (Persian: رضااباد, also Romanized as Reẕāābād) is a village in Isar Rural District, Marvast District, Khatam County, Yazd Province, Iran. At the 2006 census, its population was 75, in 20 families.
