= Feyzabad, Khatam =

Feyzabad فيض آباد
- Village
- Location within Iran
- Coordinates: 29°42′39″N 54°21′31″E
- Country: Iran
- Province: Yazd
- County: Khatam
- Bakhsh: Central
- Rural District: Chahak

Population (2006)
  - Total: 31
- Time zone: UTC+3:30 (IRST)
  - Summer (DST): UTC+4:30 (IRDT)

Feyzabad (Persian: فيض آباد, also Romanized as Feyẕābād and Faizābād) is a village in Chahak Rural District, in the Central District of Khatam County, Yazd Province, Iran. At the 2006 census, its population was 31, in 8 families.
