= Korkhongan =

Village in Yazd province, Iran

Korkhongan Persian: کرخنگان
- Village
- Location within Iran
- Coordinates: 30°08′28″N 53°58′00″E
- Country: Iran
- Province: Yazd
- County: Marvast
- District: Isar
- Rural District: Isar

Population (2016)
  - Total: 1,488
- Time zone: UTC+3:30 (IRST)

Korkhongan (Persian: كرخنگان) (Note: Also romanized as Korkhongān; also known as Garkhonkān, Karkhonkān, Korkhongū, Kurkbunjān, and Kurkhunjān) is a village in Isar Rural District of Isar District in Marvast County, Yazd province, Iran, serving as capital of both the district and the rural district.

== Demographics ==
=== Population ===
At the time of the 2006 National Census, the village's population was 1,500 in 340 households, when it was in (Note: Formerly Marvast District of Khatam County) of Khatam County. The following census in 2011 counted 1,743 people in 424 households. The 2016 census measured the population of the village as 1,488 people in 404 households. It was the most populous village in its rural district.

After the census, the district was separated from the county in the establishment of Marvast County and renamed the Central District. The rural district was transferred to the new Isar District.
