= Neyestan =

Neyestan or Nistan or Nayastan (Persian: نيستان) may refer to:

- Neyestan, Kerman
- Neyestan, Markazi
- Neyestan, Razavi Khorasan
- Neyestan, Birjand, South Khorasan Province
- Neyestan, Tabas, South Khorasan Province
- Neyestan, West Azerbaijan
- Neyestan, Yazd
