= Chakeri, Yazd =

Chakeri چاكري
- Village
- Location within Iran
- Coordinates: 30°06′03″N 54°22′57″E
- Country: Iran
- Province: Yazd
- County: Khatam
- Bakhsh: Central
- Rural District: Fathabad

Population (2006)
  - Total: 211
- Time zone: UTC+3:30 (IRST)
  - Summer (DST): UTC+4:30 (IRDT)

Chakeri (Persian: چاكري, also Romanized as Chākerī) is a village in Fathabad Rural District, in the Central District of Khatam County, Yazd Province, Iran. At the 2006 census, its population was 211, in 54 families.
