= Siahuiyeh =

Siahuiyeh سياهوييه
- Village
- Location within Iran
- Coordinates: 29°58′03″N 54°23′52″E
- Country: Iran
- Province: Yazd
- County: Khatam
- Bakhsh: Central
- Rural District: Fathabad

Population (2006)
  - Total: 23
- Time zone: UTC+3:30 (IRST)
  - Summer (DST): UTC+4:30 (IRDT)

Siahuiyeh (Persian: سياهوييه, also Romanized as Sīāhū’īyeh, Sīāhū’yeh, Sīāhūyeh, Sīyāhū’īyeh, and Seyāhūyeh; also known as Sīāhū) is a village in Fathabad Rural District, in the Central District of Khatam County, Yazd Province, Iran. At the 2006 census, its population was 23, in 4 families.
