= Marmeh =

Marmeh مارمه
- Village
- Location within Iran
- Coordinates: 28°04′01″N 53°56′25″E
- Country: Iran
- Province: Fars
- County: Larestan
- Bakhsh: Banaruiyeh
- Rural District: Banaruiyeh

Population (2006)
  - Total: 471
- Time zone: UTC+3:30 (IRST)
  - Summer (DST): UTC+4:30 (IRDT)

Marmeh (Persian: مارمه, also Romanized as Mārmeh and Mārmah) is a village in Banaruiyeh Rural District, Banaruiyeh District, Larestan County, Fars province, Iran. At the 2006 census, its population was 471, in 107 families.
