= Boruiyeh, Yazd =

Boruiyeh برويه
- Village
- Location within Iran
- Coordinates: 29°58′15″N 54°05′47″E
- Country: Iran
- Province: Yazd
- County: Khatam
- Bakhsh: Central
- Rural District: Fathabad

Population (2006)
  - Total: 72
- Time zone: UTC+3:30 (IRST)
  - Summer (DST): UTC+4:30 (IRDT)

Boruiyeh (Persian: برويه, also Romanized as Borūīyeh; also known as Būrrū’īyeh) is a village in Fathabad Rural District, in the Central District of Khatam County, Yazd Province, Iran. At the 2006 census, its population was 72, in 16 families.
