= Neyestan, Yazd =

Neyestan نيستان
- Village
- Location within Iran
- Coordinates: 29°55′26″N 54°08′19″E
- Country: Iran
- Province: Yazd
- County: Khatam
- Bakhsh: Central
- Rural District: Fathabad

Population (2006)
  - Total: 47
- Time zone: UTC+3:30 (IRST)
  - Summer (DST): UTC+4:30 (IRDT)

Neyestan (Persian: نيستان, also Romanized as Neyestān and Neyastān; also known as Negestūn) is a village in Fathabad Rural District, in the Central District of Khatam County, Yazd Province, Iran. At the 2006 census, its population was 47, in 13 families.
