= Marvast Castle =

Castle in Yazd Province, Iran

Marvast castle
- قلعه مروست
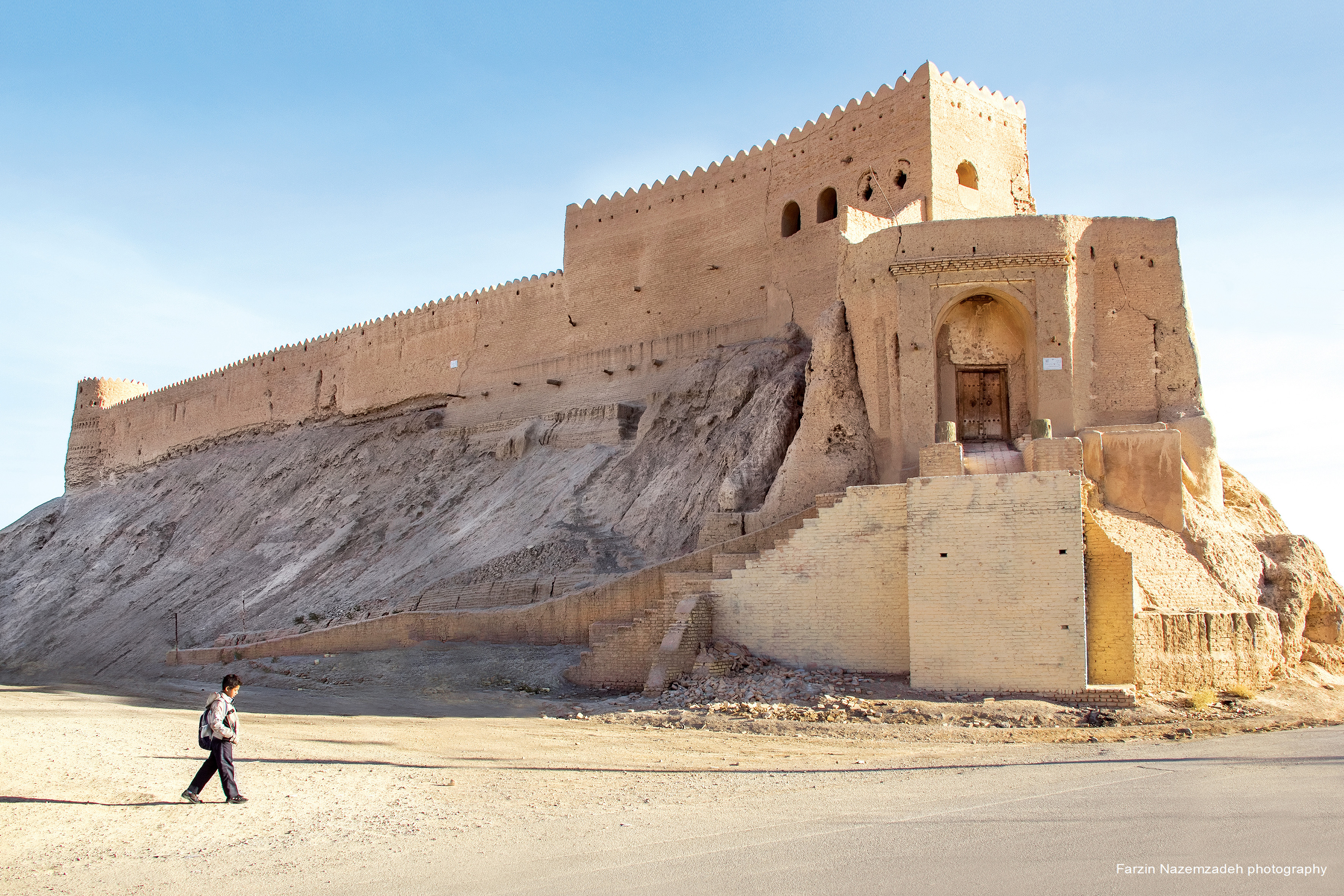

General information
- Type: Castle
- Location: Marvast, Iran

Marvast castle (Persian: قلعه مروست) is a historical castle located in Khatam County in Yazd Province, Iran. The longevity of this fortress dates back to the historical periods after Islam.
