= Boruiyeh =

Boruiyeh (Persian: برويه), also rendered as Burruiyeh, may refer to:

- Boruiyeh, Fars
- Boruiyeh, Yazd
