= Tutak Rural District =

Rural district in Yazd province, Iran

Tutak Rural District Persian: دهستان توتك
- Rural District
- Location within Iran
- Coordinates: 30°14′48″N 54°02′14″E
- Country: Iran
- Province: Yazd
- County: Marvast
- District: Isar
- Capital: Tutak
- Time zone: UTC+3:30 (IRST)

Tutak Rural District (Persian: دهستان توتك) is in Isar District of Marvast County, Yazd province, Iran. Its capital is the village of Tutak, whose population at the time of the 2016 National Census was 420 people in 118 households.

== History ==
After the census, Marvast District (Note: Renamed the Central District of Marvast County) was separated from Khatam County in the establishment of Marvast County and renamed the Central District. Tutak Rural District was created in the new Isar District.
