= Chalmeh, Yazd =

Chalmeh چالمه
- Village
- Location within Iran
- Coordinates: 29°44′57″N 54°14′12″E
- Country: Iran
- Province: Yazd
- County: Khatam
- Bakhsh: Central
- Rural District: Chahak

Population (2006)
  - Total: 84
- Time zone: UTC+3:30 (IRST)
  - Summer (DST): UTC+4:30 (IRDT)

Chalmeh (Persian: چالمه, also Romanized as Chālmeh) is a village in Chahak Rural District, in the Central District of Khatam County, Yazd Province, Iran. At the 2006 census, its population was 84, in 20 families.
