= Chahak, Yazd =

Village in Yazd province, Iran

Chahak Persian: چاهک
- Village
- Location within Iran
- Coordinates: 29°47′16″N 54°19′09″E
- Country: Iran
- Province: Yazd
- County: Khatam
- District: Chahak
- Rural District: Chahak

Population (2016)
  - Total: 2,947
- Time zone: UTC+3:30 (IRST)

Chahak (Persian: چاهک) (Note: Also romanized as Chāhak) is a village in Chahak Rural District of Chahak District of Khatam County, Yazd province, Iran, serving as capital of both the district and the rural district.

== Demographics ==
=== Population ===
At the time of the 2006 National Census, the village's population was 2,587 in 626 households, when it was in the Central District. The following census in 2011 counted 2,910 people in 778 households. The 2016 census measured the population of the village as 2,947 people in 846 households. It was the most populous village in its rural district.

After the census, the rural district was separated from the district in the formation of Chahak District.
