= Chakeri, Iran =

Chakeri or Chakari (Persian: چكري or چاكري) may refer to:

- Chakeri, Hormozgan (چكري - Chakerī)
- Chakeri, Kerman (چكري - Chakerī)
- Chakeri, Yazd (چاكري - Chākerī)
