= Bakhtiari, Yazd =

Bakhtiari بختياري
- Village
- Location within Iran
- Coordinates: 29°45′09″N 54°11′45″E
- Country: Iran
- Province: Yazd
- County: Khatam
- Bakhsh: Central
- Rural District: Chahak

Population (2006)
  - Total: 313
- Time zone: UTC+3:30 (IRST)
  - Summer (DST): UTC+4:30 (IRDT)

Bakhtiari (Persian: بختياري, also Romanized as Bakhtīārī and Bakhtiyari; also known as Bāgh-e Bakhtīārī and Bagh-i-Bakhtīāri) is a village in Chahak Rural District, in the Central District of Khatam County, Yazd Province, Iran. At the 2006 census, its population was 313, with 78 families.
