= Harabarjan =

Village in Yazd province, Iran

Harabarjan Persian: هرابرجان
- Village
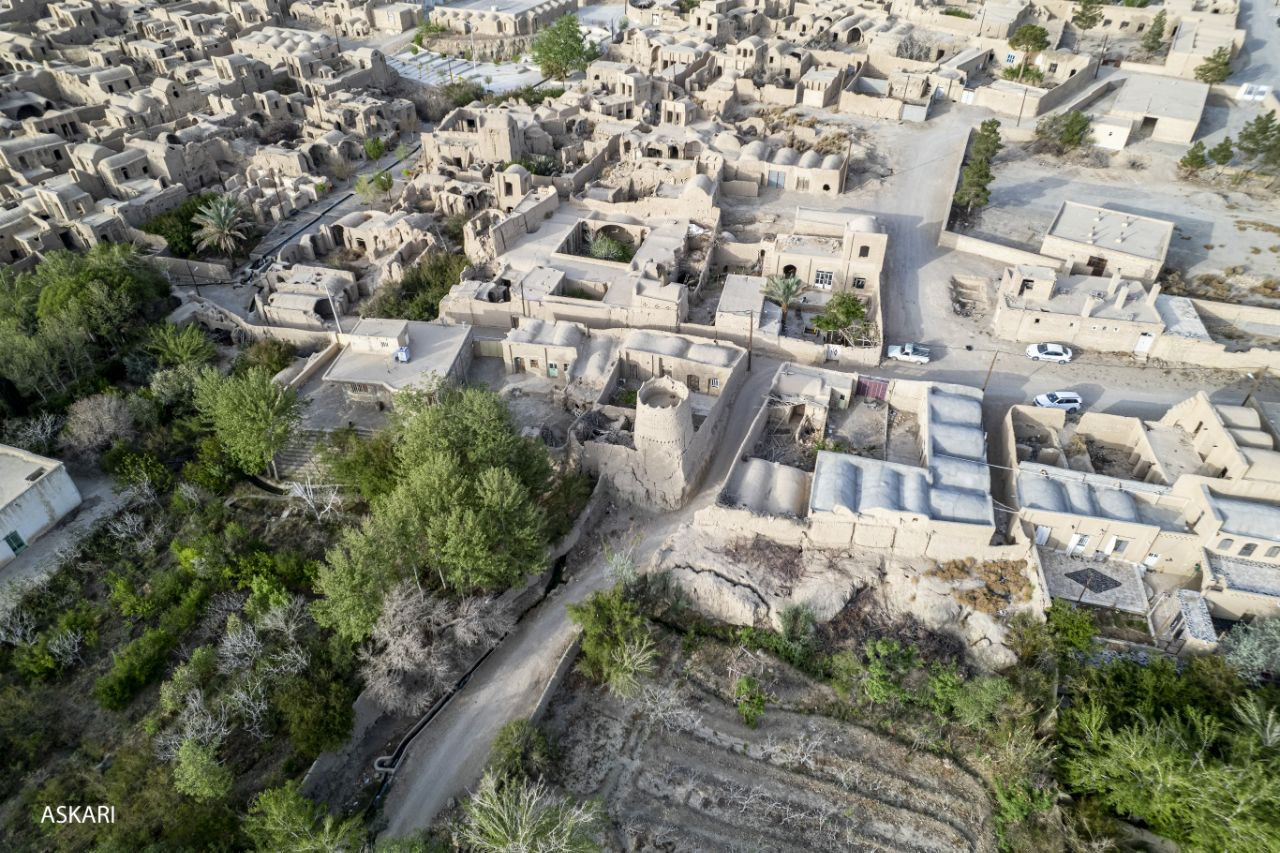

- Location within Iran
- Coordinates: 30°18′56″N 54°12′17″E
- Country: Iran
- Province: Yazd
- County: Marvast
- District: Central
- Rural District: Harabarjan

Population (2016)
  - Total: 849
- Time zone: UTC+3:30 (IRST)

Harabarjan (Persian: هرابرجان) (Note: Also romanized as Harābarjān and Herābarjān; also known as Arāvjūn, Haravarjūn, and Harvarjun) is a village in, and the capital of, Harabarjan Rural District of the Central District (Note: Formerly Marvast District of Khatam County) of Marvast County, Yazd province, Iran.

== Demographics ==
=== Population ===
At the time of the 2006 National Census, the village's population was 563 in 189 households, when it was in Marvast District (Note: Renamed the Central District of Marvast County) of Khatam County. The following census in 2011 counted 573 people in 195 households. The 2016 census measured the population of the village as 849 people in 289 households.

After the census, the district was separated from the county in the establishment of Marvast County and renamed the Central District.
