= Aravjun =

Aravjun may refer to:

- Harabarjan
- Torkan, Yazd
