= Fathabad, Khatam =

Village in Yazd province, Iran

Fathabad Persian: فتح اباد
- Village
- Location within Iran
- Coordinates: 30°06′16″N 54°23′36″E
- Country: Iran
- Province: Yazd
- County: Khatam
- District: Central
- Rural District: Fathabad

Population (2016)
  - Total: 497
- Time zone: UTC+3:30 (IRST)

Fathabad (Persian: فتح اباد) (Note: Also romanized as Fatḩābād; also known as Dabestān-e Abolfatḩ and Faraḩābād) is a village in, and the capital of, Fathabad Rural District of the Central District of Khatam County, Yazd province, Iran.

== Demographics ==
=== Population ===
At the time of the 2006 National Census, the village's population was 681 in 170 households. The following census in 2011 counted 687 people in 163 households. The 2016 census measured the population of the village as 497 people in 141 households. It was the most populous village in its rural district.
