= Torkan, Yazd =

Village in Yazd province, Iran

Torkan Persian: تركان
- Village
- Location within Iran
- Coordinates: 30°19′36″N 54°11′47″E
- Country: Iran
- Province: Yazd
- County: Marvast
- District: Central
- Rural District: Harabarjan

Population (2016)
  - Total: 1,332
- Time zone: UTC+3:30 (IRST)

Torkan (Persian: تركان) (Note: Also romanized as Torkān; also known as Arāvjūn, Barakān Herābarjān, Torkān-e-Harābarjān, Torkān-e Herābarjān, Torkūn, Towrkān, and Turkān) is a village in Harabarjan Rural District of the Central District (Note: Formerly Marvast District of Khatam County) of Marvast County, Yazd province, Iran.

== Demographics ==
=== Population ===
At the time of the 2006 National Census, the village's population was 969 in 274 households, when it was in Marvast District (Note: Renamed the Central District of Marvast County) of Khatam County. The following census in 2011 counted 1,136 people in 298 households. The 2016 census measured the population of the village as 1,332 people in 429 households. It was the most populous village in its rural district.

After the census, the district was separated from the county in the establishment of Marvast County and renamed the Central District.
