= Shahriari-ye Sofla =

Shahriari-ye Sofla شهریاری سفلی
- Village
- Location within Iran
- Coordinates: 29°42′28″N 54°18′56″E
- Country: Iran
- Province: Yazd
- County: Khatam
- Bakhsh: Central
- Rural District: Chahak

Population (2006)
  - Total: 151
- Time zone: UTC+3:30 (IRST)
  - Summer (DST): UTC+4:30 (IRDT)

Shahriari-ye Sofla (Persian: شهریاری سفلی, also Romanized as Shahrīārī-ye Soflá; also known as Chāh-e Shahrīārī, Chāh-i-Shahryāri, Dasht-e Shahrīārī, and Shahryārī) is a village in Chahak Rural District, in the Central District of Khatam County, Yazd Province, Iran. At the 2006 census, its population was 151, in 41 families.
