= Hasanabad-e Margemari =

Hasanabad-e Margemari حسن ابادمرگ ماري
- Village
- Location within Iran
- Coordinates: 28°04′20″N 53°54′46″E
- Country: Iran
- Province: Fars
- County: Larestan
- Bakhsh: Banaruiyeh
- Rural District: Banaruiyeh

Population (2006)
  - Total: 378
- Time zone: UTC+3:30 (IRST)
  - Summer (DST): UTC+4:30 (IRDT)

Hasanabad-e Margemari (Persian: حسن ابادمرگ ماري, also Romanized as Ḩasanābād-e Margemārī; also known as Ḩasanābād and Ḩasanābād-e Mārmeh) is a village in Banaruiyeh Rural District, Banaruiyeh District, Larestan County, Fars province, Iran. At the 2006 census, its population was 378, in 85 families.
