= Sharafuyeh =

Village in Fars province, Iran

Sharafuyeh Persian: شرفويه
- Village
- Location within Iran
- Coordinates: 28°01′19″N 54°06′42″E
- Country: Iran
- Province: Fars
- County: Larestan
- District: Banaruiyeh
- Rural District: Banaruiyeh

Population (2016)
  - Total: 2,345
- Time zone: UTC+3:30 (IRST)

Sharafuyeh (Persian: شرفويه) (Note: Also romanized as Sharafūyeh, Sharfooyeh, and Sharfūyeh; also known as Shahr-e Fūyeh and Shahr Fūyeh) is a village in Banaruiyeh Rural District of Banaruiyeh District, Larestan County, (Note: Formerly Lar County) Fars province, Iran.

== Demographics ==
=== Population ===
At the time of the 2006 National Census, the village's population was 2,439 in 561 households. The following census in 2011 counted 3,096 people in 739 households. The 2016 census measured the population of the village as 2,345 people in 727 households. It was the most populous village in its rural district.
