= Sikan, Iran =

Sikan, Iran may refer to:

- Chaleh Siah, Ilam
- Hashemabad, Ilam
