= Shahriari Rural District (Khatam County) =

Rural district in Yazd province, Iran

Shahriari Rural District Persian: دهستان شهریاری
- Rural District
- Location within Iran
- Coordinates: 29°41′31″N 54°22′45″E
- Country: Iran
- Province: Yazd
- County: Khatam
- District: Chahak
- Capital: Shahriari-ye Olya
- Time zone: UTC+3:30 (IRST)

Shahriari Rural District (Persian: دهستان شهریاری) is in Chahak District of Khatam County, Yazd province, Iran. Its capital is the village of Shahriari-ye Olya, whose population at the time of the 2016 National Census was 708 people.

== History ==
After the 2016 census, Chahak Rural District was separated from the Central District in the formation of Chahak District, and Shahriari Rural District was created in the new district.
