= Isar District =

District in Yazd province, Iran

Isar District Persian: بخش ايثار
- District
- Location within Iran
- Coordinates: 30°10′16″N 54°02′03″E
- Country: Iran
- Province: Yazd
- County: Marvast
- Capital: Korkhongan
- Time zone: UTC+3:30 (IRST)

Isar District (Persian: بخش ايثار) is in Marvast County, Yazd province, Iran. Its capital is the village of Korkhongan, whose population at the time of the 2016 National Census was 1,488 in 404 households.

== History ==
After the 2016 census, Marvast District (Note: Renamed the Central District of Marvast County) was separated from Khatam County in the establishment of Marvast County and renamed the Central District. The new county was divided into two districts of two rural districts each, with Marvast as its capital and only city at the time.

== Demographics ==
=== Administrative divisions ===
Isar District
Administrative Divisions
Isar RD
Tutak RD
RD = Rural District
