= Shehri =

Shehri may refer to:

- Shehri language, a Modern South Arabian language of Oman
- Al-Shehri, an Arabic-language surname (including a list of persons with the name)

== See also ==
- Shahri (disambiguation)
