= Shahri =

Shahri (Persian: شهري) may refer to:

- Shahri, Hormozgan, a village in Iran
- Shahri, Mazandaran, a village in Iran
- Golshahr, Sistan and Baluchestan, also known as Shahri, a village in Iran

== See also ==
- Shahri language of Oman
- Shehri (disambiguation)
- Shahar (disambiguation)
