= Chahar =

Chahar or Chakhar may refer to:

== Sino-Mongolian uses ==
- Chahar Mongols, a Mongol tribe
- Chakhar Mongolian (Chakhar), a Mongolian dialect spoken by the Chahar tribe
- Chahar Province, a former province of China named after them
- Chahar Right Front Banner, in Inner Mongolia, China
- Chahar Right Middle Banner, in Inner Mongolia, China
- Chahar Right Back Banner, in Inner Mongolia, China

== Afghan uses ==
- Aymāq, a Persian-speaking nomadic people of Afghanistan originally known as chahar
- Chahar Bolak District, a district in Afghanistan
- Khani Chahar Bagh District, a district in Afghanistan

== Iranian/Persian uses ==
- Charbagh, a style of Persian garden
- Charbagh, Isfahan ("Four Gardens"), an avenue in Isfahan, Iran
- Chaharbagh School, a 16th-17th century cultural complex in Isfahan, Iran
- Chaharmahal and Bakhtiari Province, a province of Iran

== Other uses ==
- Çahar (Chakhar), Azerbaijan, a village

== See also ==
- Chahar Suq (disambiguation)
- Chakar (disambiguation)
- Shahar (disambiguation)
