= Chakar =

Chakar may refer to:

== People ==
- Chakar Ali Khan Junejo (1928–1997), ambassador of Pakistan to the United Arab Emirates
- Mir Chakar Rind, Baloch chieftain in the 15th century
- Pervin Chakar (born 1981), Kurdish-Turkish opera singer

== Places ==
- Chakar, India, town in Ludhiana, Punjab, India
- Chakar, Iran (disambiguation), several places
- Shahpur Chakar, town in Pakistan

== See also ==
- Chaker (disambiguation)
- Chakhar (disambiguation)
- Chakari (disambiguation)
