= Siahu =

Siahu (Persian: سياهو) may refer to:

- Siahu, Fars
- Siahu, Yazd
