= Chaker =

Chaker may refer to:

== People ==
=== Given name ===
- Chaker Alhadhur (born 1991), Comorian footballer
- Chaker Bargaoui (born 1983), Tunisian footballer
- Chaker Ghezal (born 1977), Tunisian volleyball player
- Chaker Meftah (born 1957), Tunisian football manager and former player
- Chaker Rguiî (born 1987), Tunisian footballer
- Chaker Zouaghi (born 1985), Tunisian footballer

=== Surname ===
- Abdelmajid Chaker (1927–2021), Tunisian politician
- Fadel Chaker or Fadl Shaker (born 1969), Lebanese singer
- Ghaliaa Chaker (born 1998), Syrian singer-songwriter and musician
- Layale Chaker, French-Lebanese violinist and composer
- Ludovic Chaker (born 1979), French diplomat and politician
- Mohamed Chaker (1930–2024), Tunisian lawyer and politician
- Salem Chaker (born 1950), Algerian linguist
- Slim Chaker (1961–2017), Tunisian politician and minister

== Places ==
- Menzel Chaker, town in Tunisia
- Chaker, Iran (disambiguation)

== See also ==
- Chakar (disambiguation)
- Shaker (disambiguation)
