= Chakari =

Charkari may refer to:

- Chakari, Afghanistan
- Chakari, Iran (disambiguation)
- Chakari, Zimbabwe

== See also ==
- Chakar (disambiguation)
