= Mobarakeh Rural District (Marvast County) =

Rural district in Yazd province, Iran

Mobarakeh Rural District Persian: دهستان مبارکه
- Rural District
- Location within Iran
- Coordinates: 30°40′21″N 54°12′14″E
- Country: Iran
- Province: Yazd
- County: Marvast
- District: Central
- Capital: Mobarakeh
- Time zone: UTC+3:30 (IRST)

Mobarakeh Rural District (Persian: دهستان مبارکه) is in the Central District (Note: Formerly Marvast District of Khatam County) of Marvast County, Yazd province, Iran. Its capital is Mobarakeh, whose population at the time of the 2016 National Census was 360 people in 109 households.

== History ==
After the 2016 census, Marvast District (Note: Renamed the Central District of Marvast County) was separated from Khatam County in the establishment of Marvast County and renamed the Central District. Mobarakeh Rural District was created in the district.
