= Deh Fish =

Village in Fars province, Iran

Deh Fish Persian: ده فيش
- Village
- Location within Iran
- Coordinates: 28°08′36″N 53°51′07″E
- Country: Iran
- Province: Fars
- County: Larestan
- District: Banaruiyeh
- Rural District: Deh Fish

Population (2016)
  - Total: 1,404
- Time zone: UTC+3:30 (IRST)

Deh Fish (Persian: دهفيش) (Note: Also romanized as Deh Fīsh) is a village in, and the capital of, Deh Fish Rural District of Banaruiyeh District, Larestan County, (Note: Formerly Lar County) Fars province, Iran.

== Demographics ==
=== Population ===
At the time of the 2006 National Census, the village's population was 1,317 in 295 households. The following census in 2011 counted 1,487 people in 391 households. The 2016 census measured the population of the village as 1,404 people in 449 households.
