= Lagharan =

Village in Fars province, Iran

Lagharan Persian: لاغران
- Village
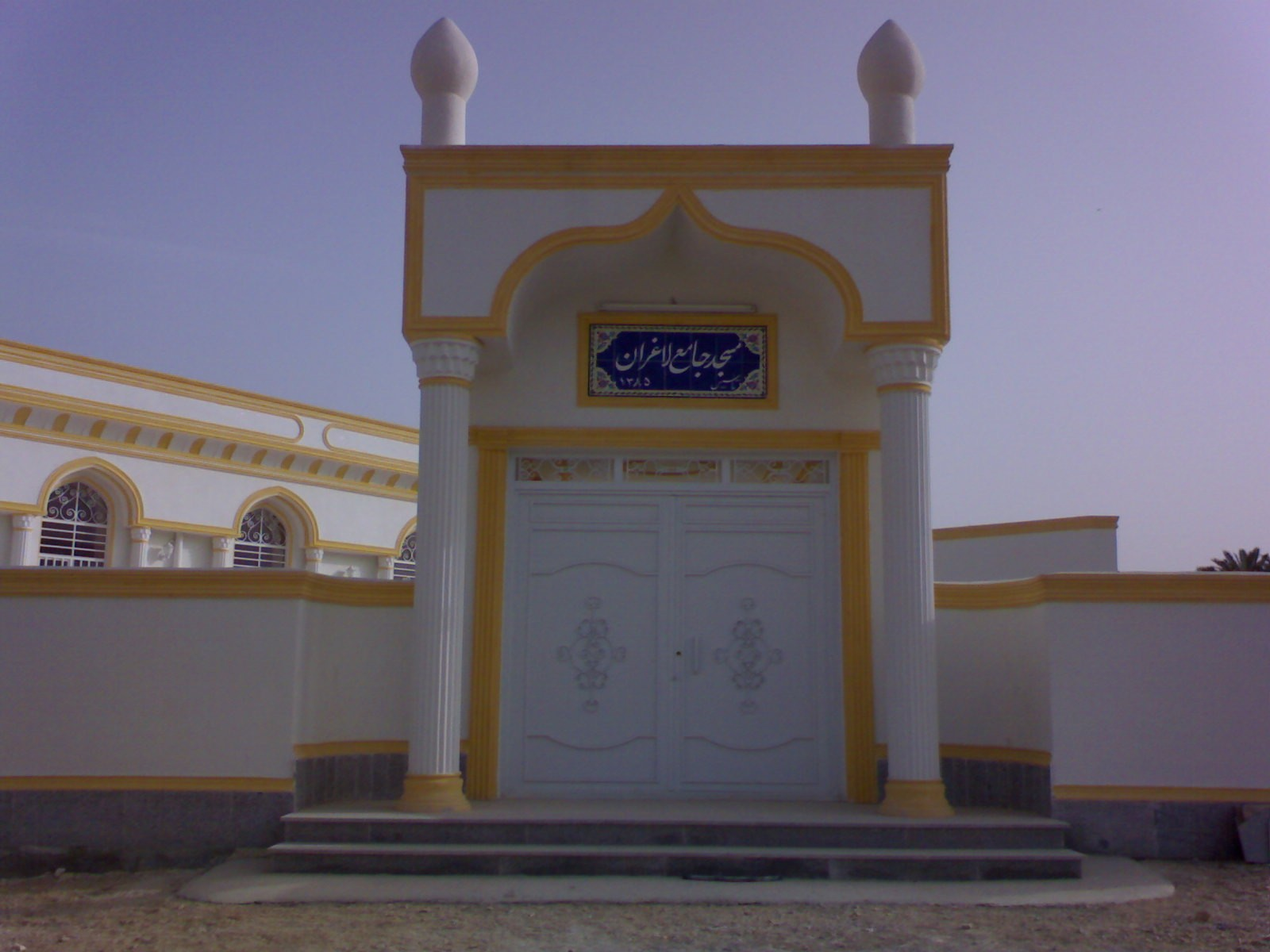
- Lagharan Jameh Mosque

- Location within Iran
- Coordinates: 28°09′21″N 53°40′54″E
- Country: Iran
- Province: Fars
- County: Larestan
- District: Banaruiyeh
- Rural District: Deh Fish

Population (2016)
  - Total: 1,936
- Time zone: UTC+3:30 (IRST)

Lagharan (Persian: لاغران) (Note: Also romanized as Lāgharān) is a village in Deh Fish Rural District of Banaruiyeh District, Larestan County, (Note: Formerly Lar County) Fars province, Iran.

== Demographics ==
=== Population ===
At the time of the 2006 National Census, the village's population was 1,601 in 336 households. The following census in 2011 counted 1,777 people in 424 households. The 2016 census measured the population of the village as 1,936 people in 499 households. It was the most populous village in its rural district.
