= Chalmeh =

Chalmeh (Persian: چالمه or چالمه) may refer to:

- Chalmeh, Ardabil (چالمه - Chalmeh)
- Chalmeh, Markazi (چالمه - Chalmeh)
- Chalmeh, Yazd (چالمه - Chālmeh)
