= Chaker, Iran =

Chaker or Chakar (Persian: چاكر) in Iran may refer to:

- Chaker Bazar
- Chaker Zehi
- Qush-e Chaker
