= Bakhtiari (surname) =

Bakhtiari (and its variant Bakhtiary) is a surname of Persian origin. Notable people with the surname are as follows:

- Abu'l-Fath Khan Bakhtiari (died 1750), supreme chieftain of the Bakhtiari tribe
- Ali Mardan Khan Bakhtiari (died 1754), supreme chieftain of the Bakhtiari tribe
- Ali Morad Bakhtiari (died 1735), supreme chieftain of the Bakhtiari tribe
- Ali Morteza Samsam Bakhtiari (1945–2007), Iranian author and oil expert
- Ali-Qoli Khan Bakhtiari (1856–1917), supreme chieftain of the Bakhtiari tribe and revolutionary
- Alireza Bakhtiari, Iranian media executive
- Behnoosh Bakhtiari (born 1975), Iranian actress
- Bibi Maryam Bakhtiari (1874–1937), Iranian politician
- David Bakhtiari (born 1991), American football player
- Eric Bakhtiari (born 1984), American football player
- Khalil Esfandiary-Bakhtiary (1901–1983), Iranian diplomat
- Liliana Bakhtiari, Iranian American community organizer
- Morteza Bakhtiari (born 1952), Iranian politician
- Najaf-Qoli Khan Bakhtiari (1846–1930), former prime minister of Iran
- Pouya Bakhtiari (1992–2019), Iranian activist
- Shapour Bakhtiar (1914–1991), former prime minister of Iran
- Soraya Esfandiary-Bakhtiary (1932–2001), former queen consort of Iran
