= Herat, Iran =

City in Yazd province, Iran

Herat Persian: هرات
- City
- Location within Iran
- Coordinates: 30°03′17″N 54°22′18″E
- Country: Iran
- Province: Yazd
- County: Khatam
- District: Central

Population (2016)
  - Total: 13,032
- Time zone: UTC+03:30 (IRST)

Herat (Persian: هرات) (Note: Also romanized as Herāt; also known as Burd Herat (بورد هِرات), also romanized as Būrd Harāt and Būrd Herāt; also known as Harāt Khowreh and Herāt-i-Khurreh; formerly Tājābād and Tājābād-e Harāt) is a city in the Central District of Khatam County, Yazd province, Iran, serving as capital of both the county and the district.

== Demographics ==
=== Population ===
At the time of the 2006 National Census, the city's population was 10,795 in 2,751 households. The following census in 2011 counted 12,392 people in 3,357 households. The 2016 census measured the population of the city as 13,032 people in 3,834 households.

== Climate ==
Herat has a hot and dry desert climate with a high diurnal temperature range. The city experiences average high temperatures reaching 41°C (105°F) in July, while winter nights can drop to about 1°C (34°F) in January. Annual precipitation is under 50 mm (2 inches), mostly occurring in late winter and early spring. Humidity remains low year-round, typically fluctuating between 10% and 38%. Due to clear skies and low atmospheric moisture, the rapid cooling after sunset results in cool nights even in summer. Herat's climate is influenced by its proximity to the Lut Desert, known for its extreme heat, sparse vegetation, and strong seasonal winds.

Climate data for Herat, Yazd, Iran
Month	Jan	Feb	Mar	Apr	May	Jun	Jul	Aug	Sep	Oct	Nov	Dec	Year
Record high °C (°F)	20.5 (68.9)	21.0 (69.8)	26.3 (79.3)	32.0 (89.6)	38.0 (100.4)	41.2 (106.2)	42.3 (108.1)	41.5 (106.7)	39.0 (102.2)	35.0 (95.0)	26.7 (80.1)	21.8 (71.2)	42.3 (108.1)
Mean daily maximum °C (°F)	15.3 (59.5)	16.1 (61.0)	20.4 (68.7)	25.6 (78.1)	32.1 (89.8)	37.5 (99.5)	39.4 (102.9)	38.8 (101.8)	35.4 (95.7)	29.5 (85.1)	20.4 (68.7)	15.6 (60.1)	28.5 (83.3)
Daily mean °C (°F)	8.2 (46.8)	9.0 (48.2)	13.1 (55.6)	18.6 (65.5)	24.5 (76.1)	29.3 (84.7)	31.2 (88.2)	30.6 (87.1)	27.7 (81.9)	21.9 (71.4)	14.5 (58.1)	9.4 (48.9)	20.2 (68.4)
Mean daily minimum °C (°F)	1.1 (34.0)	2.1 (35.8)	5.9 (42.6)	10.4 (50.7)	16.2 (61.2)	21.3 (70.3)	23.1 (73.6)	22.8 (73.0)	20.1 (68.2)	14.3 (57.7)	7.6 (45.7)	2.9 (37.2)	10.7 (51.3)
Average precipitation mm (inches)	11.4 (0.45)	10.3 (0.41)	17.5 (0.69)	20.4 (0.80)	10.9 (0.43)	0.5 (0.02)	0.0 (0.0)	0.1 (0.00)	2.3 (0.09)	6.8 (0.27)	14.0 (0.55)	9.1 (0.36)	92.8 (3.65)
Average precipitation days	3.1	3.0	4.2	4.8	3.0	0.3	0.1	0.1	0.9	2.5	4.1	3.0	30.4
Average relative humidity (%)	36	34	32	28	21	17	16	16	18	22	26	30	23
Source: https://weatherspark.com/y/105370/Average-Weather-in-Shahr-e-Her%C4%81t-Iran-Year-Round
