= Shahar =

Shahar may refer to:

- Shahar (god), a deity in Ugaritic and Canaanite religion
- Shahar (newspaper), Kazakh newspaper

== Places ==
- Ayelet HaShahar, a kibbutz in Northern District, Israel
- Shahar, Israel, a moshav in Southern District, Israel
- Shahar River, a river in northwestern Iran
- Shahar, Saudi Arabia, a village in Asir, Saudi Arabia

== Given name ==
- Shahar Biran (born 1998), Israeli tennis player
- Shahar Gordon (born 1980), Israeli basketball player
- Shahar Kober (born 1979), Israeli illustrator
- Shahar Milfelder (born 1997), Israeli Paralympic medalist rower
- Shahar Pe'er (born 1987), Israeli tennis player
- Shahar Perkiss (born 1962), Israeli tennis player
- Shachar Sagiv (born 1994), Israeli triathlete
- Shahar Tavoch (born 1999), Israeli actor, voice actor, and TV host

== Surname ==
- Ayelet Shachar (born 1966), Israeli-born Canadian legal scholar
- Nathan Shahar (1937–2021), Israeli conductor, composer, and musicologist
- Shulamith Shahar (1928–2025), Israeli historian

== See also ==
- Shahri (disambiguation)
- Chahar (disambiguation)
