= Chahar Suq =

Chahar Suq or Chehar Suq (Persian: چهارسوق) may refer to:

- Chahar Suq, Hamadan
- Chahar Suq, Razavi Khorasan
- Chahar Suq And Haji Muhammad Husayn Mosque
