= Banaruiyeh =

City in Fars province, Iran

Banaruiyeh Persian: بنارويه
- City
- Location within Iran
- Coordinates: 28°05′11″N 54°02′53″E
- Country: Iran
- Province: Fars
- County: Larestan
- District: Banaruiyeh

Population (2016)
  - Total: 9,077
- Time zone: UTC+3:30 (IRST)

Banaruiyeh (Persian: بنارويه) (Note: Also romanized as Banarooyeh, Banārū’īyeh, Banārū”īyeh, Banārūyeh, and Bonārūyeh; formerly Fathābād, also romanized as Fathabad) is a city in, and the capital of, Banaruiyeh District of Larestan County, (Note: Formerly Lar County) Fars province, Iran. It also serves as the administrative center for Banaruiyeh Rural District.

== Demographics ==
=== Language ===
The most widely spoken language is Achomi.

=== Population ===
At the time of the 2006 National Census, the city's population was 9,318 in 1,943 households. The following census in 2011 counted 10,977 people in 2,952 households. The 2016 census measured the population of the city as 9,077 people in 2,580 households.
