= Ali Morad Bakhtiari =

Bakhtiari chieftain of the Chahar Lang branch

Ali Morad Bakhtiari (Luri/Persian: علی‌ مراد بختیاری, romanized: Alī-Morād Bakhtīārī) was the Bakhtiari chieftain of the Chahar Lang branch in the early 18th-century, who in 1735 revolted against the de facto ruler of Safavid Iran, Nader Qoli Beg.

== Biography ==
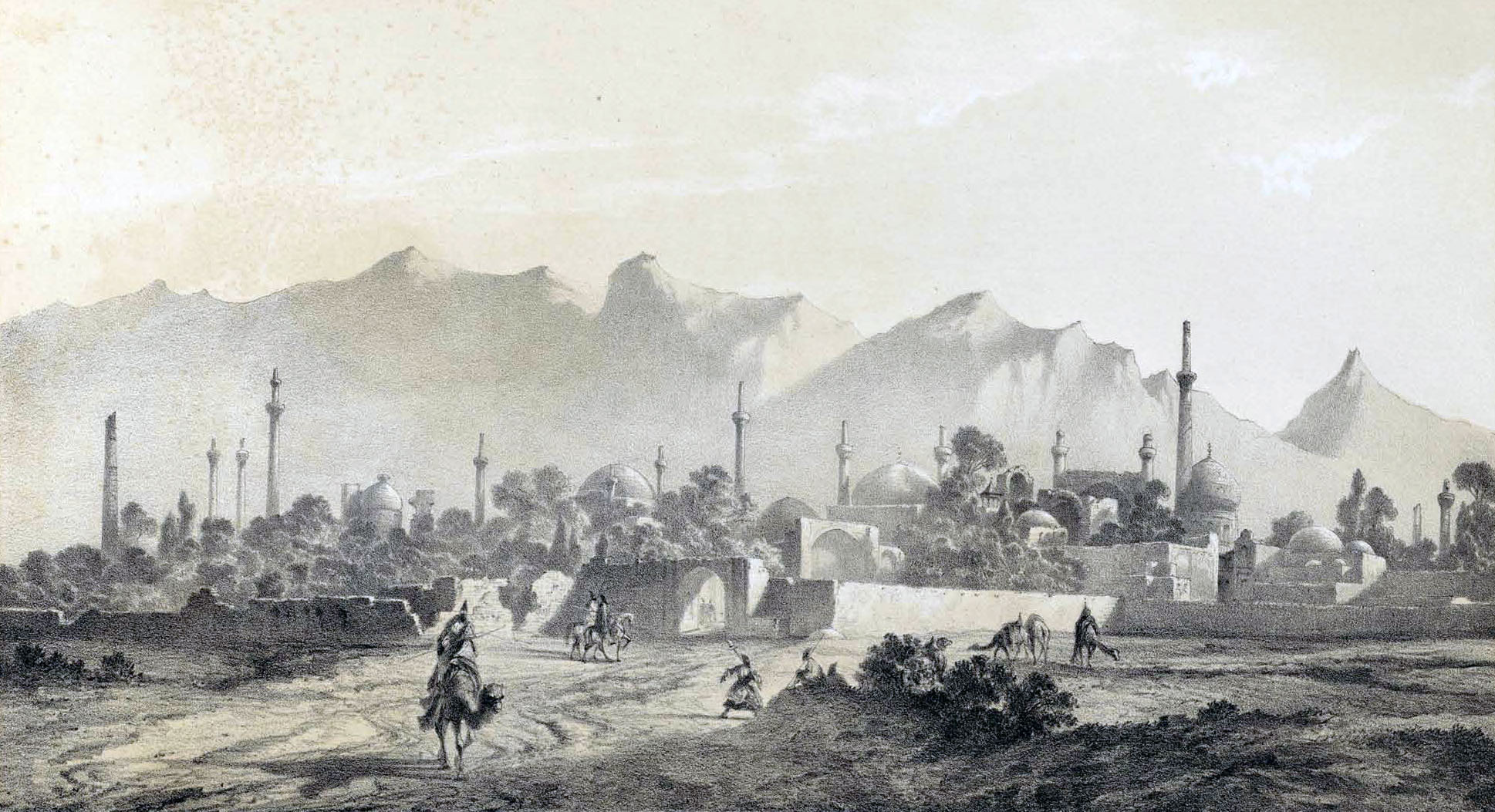
An illustration of Isfahan from the north.

Ali Morad Bakhtiari was among the Bakhtiaris that in the early 1730s were forced to resettle in Khorasan by Nader Qoli Beg, the de facto ruler of the Safavid dynasty. However, while many Bakhtiaris, Lurs, and Laks were subdued and sent to Khorasan, Ali Morad was among the Bakhtiaris that managed to resist Nader's forces. Ali Morad, along with other tribesmen responded by raiding the surroundings of the capital, Isfahan. By the autumn of 1735, a major revolt erupted under the leadership of Ali Morad, who had raised an army of 20,000, and bragged that he would defeat Nader and rescue the Safavid king Tahmasp II from his house arrest in Khorasan.

The revolt forced Nader to halt his campaigns in the east, and made him return to western Iran, where he ordered the governors of the zone to attack Ali Morad and his forces. Although the rebels fought steely, they were eventually forced to withdraw into the mountains. Nader shortly captured the key Bakhtiari stronghold of Liruk, and pursued the fleeing rebels, seizing circa 3,000 families.

The majority of the rebels eventually surrendered to Nader, but Ali Morad had managed to stay hidden. However, Nader's forces spotted a sceptical woman coming down from the highlands, whom they held captive and awake for 24 hours, till she admitted the location of Ali Morad and his family. Nader and his men shortly went to the cave where they were hiding—Ali Morad, however, managed to withstand his men for a few days, but ultimately chose to kill his wives and daughters instead of letting them get captured.

He was then captured and sent to Shushtar, where Nader, extremely enraged and frustrated, had him blinded, and his hands, ears, feet, and nose removed. Ali Morad, laying in a pool of blood, asked for water, and died shortly afterwards, whilst thousands of Bakhtiari kinsmen were forced to mass-migrate to Khorasan, and others enlisted into Nader's army.

== Sources ==
- Axworthy, Michael (2009). The Sword of Persia: Nader Shah, from tribal warrior to conquering tyrant, I. B. Tauris
