= Bakhtiar, Bagh-e Malek =

Bakhtiar بختيار
- Village
- Location within Iran
- Coordinates: 31°37′43″N 49°46′15″E
- Country: Iran
- Province: Khuzestan
- County: Bagh-e Malek
- Bakhsh: Central
- Rural District: Rud Zard

Population (2006)
  - Total: 85
- Time zone: UTC+3:30 (IRST)
  - Summer (DST): UTC+4:30 (IRDT)

Bakhtiar (Persian: بختيار, also Romanized as Bakhtīār and Bakhtiyar; also known as Garāvand-e Bakhteyār, Garāvand-e Bakhtīār, and Gazāvand-e Bakhtiār) is a village in Rud Zard Rural District, in the Central District of Bagh-e Malek County, Khuzestan Province, Iran. At the 2006 census, its population was 85, in 30 families.
