= Golshahr, Sistan and Baluchestan =

Golshahr گلشهر
- Village
- Location within Iran
- Coordinates: 27°17′13″N 60°54′37″E
- Country: Iran
- Province: Sistan and Baluchestan
- County: Iranshahr
- Bakhsh: Central
- Rural District: Abtar

Population (2006)
  - Total: 157
- Time zone: UTC+3:30 (IRST)
  - Summer (DST): UTC+4:30 (IRDT)

Golshahr (Persian: گلشهر; also known as Chāh-e Zī, Chāh Zī, Gwe Shahr, and Shahrī) is a village in Abtar Rural District, in the Central District of Iranshahr County, Sistan and Baluchestan Province, Iran. At the 2006 census, its population was 157, in 33 families.
