= Hashemabad, Nain =

Hashemabad هاشم اباد
- Village
- Location within Iran
- Coordinates: 32°40′09″N 52°58′33″E
- Country: Iran
- Province: Isfahan
- County: Nain
- Bakhsh: Central
- Rural District: Lay Siyah

Population (2006)
  - Total: 34
- Time zone: UTC+3:30 (IRST)
  - Summer (DST): UTC+4:30 (IRDT)

Hashemabad (Persian: هاشم اباد, also Romanized as Hāshemābād; also known as Hāshimābād) is a village in Lay Siyah Rural District, in the Central District of Nain County, Isfahan Province, Iran. At the 2006 census, its population was 34, in 13 families.
