= Chahak District =

District in Yazd province, Iran

Chahak District Persian: بخش چاهک
- District
- Location within Iran
- Coordinates: 29°44′12″N 54°20′28″E
- Country: Iran
- Province: Yazd
- County: Khatam
- Capital: Chahak
- Time zone: UTC+3:30 (IRST)

Chahak District (Persian: بخش چاهک) is in Khatam County, Yazd province, Iran. Its capital is the village of Chahak, whose population at the time of the 2016 National Census was 2,947 in 846 households.

== History ==
After the 2016 census, Chahak Rural District was separated from the Central District in the formation of Chahak District.

== Demographics ==
=== Administrative divisions ===
Chahak District
Administrative Divisions
Chahak RD
Shahriari RD
RD = Rural District
