= Hashemabad, Marvdasht =

Hashemabad هاشم اباد
- Village
- Location within Iran
- Coordinates: 30°06′34″N 52°40′28″E
- Country: Iran
- Province: Fars
- County: Marvdasht
- Bakhsh: Dorudzan
- Rural District: Abarj

Population (2006)
  - Total: 203
- Time zone: UTC+3:30 (IRST)
  - Summer (DST): UTC+4:30 (IRDT)

Hashemabad (Persian: هاشم اباد, also Romanized as Hāshemābād; also known as Hashimābād) is a village in Abarj Rural District, Dorudzan District, Marvdasht County, Fars province, Iran. At the 2006 census, its population was 203, in 41 families.
