= Hashemabad-e Soltani =

Hashemabad-e Soltani هاشم ابادسلطاني
- Village
- Location within Iran
- Coordinates: 36°07′39″N 58°46′23″E
- Country: Iran
- Province: Razavi Khorasan
- County: Nishapur
- Bakhsh: Central
- Rural District: Rivand

Population (2006)
  - Total: 107
- Time zone: UTC+3:30 (IRST)
  - Summer (DST): UTC+4:30 (IRDT)

Hashemabad-e Soltani (Persian: هاشم ابادسلطاني, also Romanized as Hāshemābād-e Solţānī) is a village in Rivand Rural District, in the Central District of Nishapur County, Razavi Khorasan Province, Iran. At the 2006 census, its population was 107, in 31 families.
