= Chaker Bazar =

Chaker Bazar چاكربازار
- Village
- Location within Iran
- Coordinates: 25°35′00″N 61°12′28″E
- Country: Iran
- Province: Sistan and Baluchestan
- County: Chabahar
- Bakhsh: Polan
- Rural District: Polan

Population (2006)
  - Total: 258
- Time zone: UTC+3:30 (IRST)
  - Summer (DST): UTC+4:30 (IRDT)

Chaker Bazar (Persian: چاكربازار, also Romanized as Chāker Bāzār; also known as Shāker Bāzār) is a village in Polan Rural District, Polan District, Chabahar County, Sistan and Baluchestan Province, Iran. At the 2006 census, its population was 258, in 48 families.
