= Deh Fish Rural District =

Rural district in Fars province, Iran

Deh Fish Rural District Persian: دهستان ده فيش
- Rural District
- Location within Iran
- Coordinates: 28°05′54″N 53°48′04″E
- Country: Iran
- Province: Fars
- County: Larestan
- District: Banaruiyeh
- Capital: Deh Fish

Population (2016)
  - Total: 4,307
- Time zone: UTC+3:30 (IRST)

Deh Fish Rural District (Persian: دهستان ده فيش) is in Banaruiyeh District of Larestan County, (Note: Formerly Lar County) Fars province, Iran. Its capital is the village of Deh Fish.

== Demographics ==
=== Population ===
At the time of the 2006 National Census, the rural district's population was 3,966 in 826 households. There were 3,917 inhabitants in 965 households at the following census of 2011. The 2016 census measured the population of the rural district as 4,307 in 1,242 households. The most populous of its 10 villages was Lagharan, with 1,936 people.
