= Chahar Suq and Hajj Muhammad Husayn Mosque =

Shi'ite mosque in Ardakan, Yazd, Iran

- چهارسوق و مسجد حاج محمدحسین
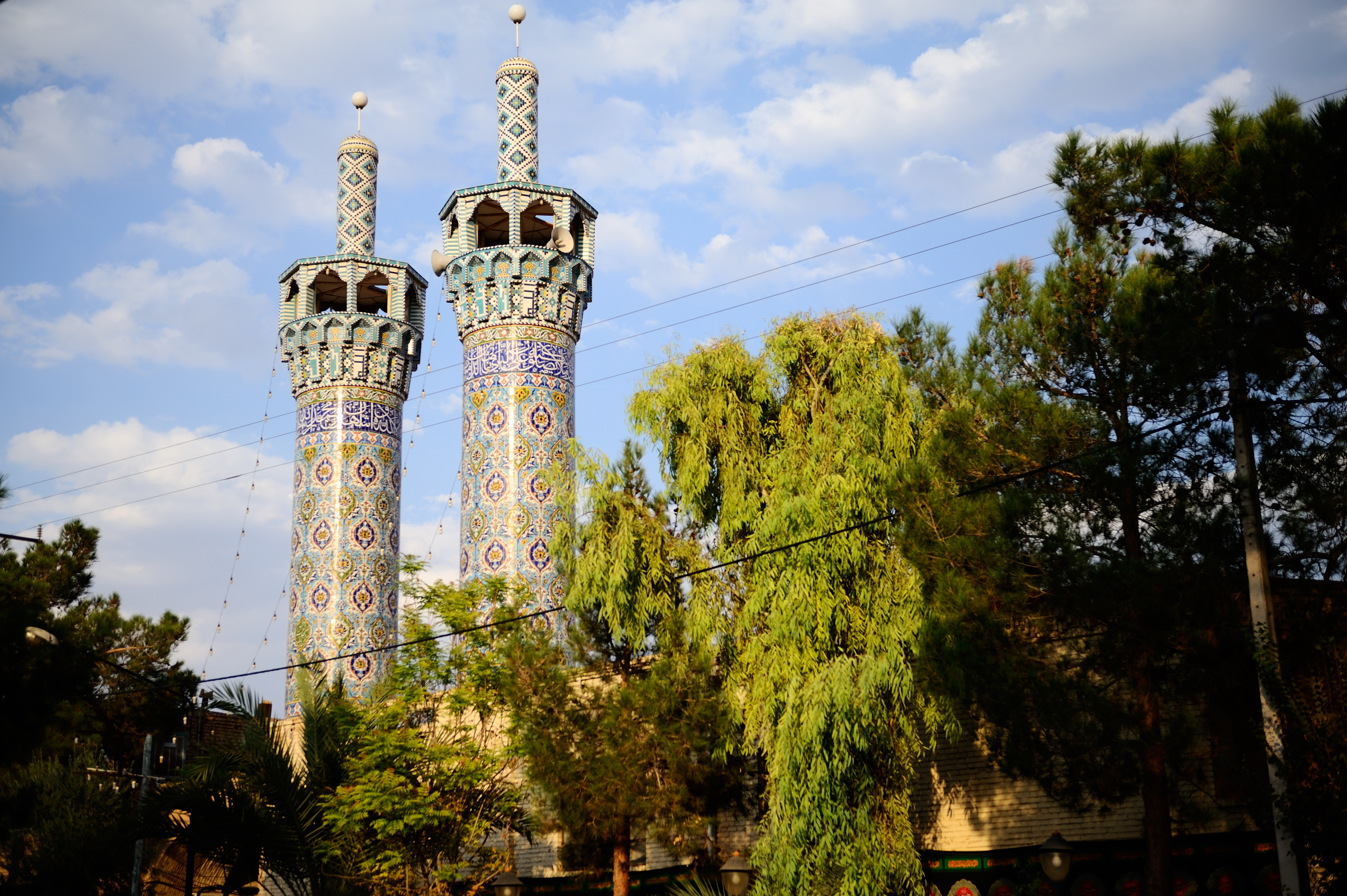
- The mosque minarets in 2020

- Location of the mosque in Iran

Religion
- Affiliation: Shia Islam
- Ecclesiastical or organizational status: Mosque
- Status: Active

Location
- Location: Ardakan, Yazd Province
- Country: Iran
- Interactive map of Chahar Suq and Hajj Muhammad Husayn Mosque
- Coordinates: 32°19′9″N 54°1′16″E

Architecture
- Type: Mosque architecture
- Style: Qajar
- Completed: 1834 CE

Specifications
- Dome: One
- Materials: Bricks; plaster; tiles

Iran National Heritage List
- Official name: Chahar Suq and Hajj Muhammad Husayn Mosque
- Type: Built
- Designated: 20 January 1975
- Reference no.: 1628
- Conservation organization: Cultural Heritage, Handicrafts and Tourism Organization of Iran

The Chahar Suq and Hajj Muhammad Husayn Mosque (Persian: چهارسوق و مسجد حاج محمدحسین; Arabic: مسجد الحاج محمد حسين), (Note: Variously known as the Hajj Muhammad Husayn Mosque, the Haj Mohammad Hosayn Mosque, the Hajj Mohammad Hosayn Mosque, and the Chaharsuq and Hajj Muhammad Husayn Mosque.) is a Shi'ite mosque located opposite the Ardakan Seminary, in the center of the city of Ardakan, in the province of Yazd, Iran.

Completed in 1834 CE, during the Qajar era, the mosque was added to the Iran National Heritage List on 20 January 1975, administered by the Cultural Heritage, Handicrafts and Tourism Organization of Iran.

== See also ==
- Shia Islam in Iran
- List of mosques in Iran
