= Kadkhodalu-ye Pain =

Kadkhodalu-ye Pain كدخدالوپائين
- Village
- Location within Iran
- Coordinates: 39°16′09″N 47°06′54″E
- Country: Iran
- Province: East Azerbaijan
- County: Khoda Afarin
- Bakhsh: Central
- Rural District: Bastamlu

Population (2006)
  - Total: 40
- Time zone: UTC+3:30 (IRST)
  - Summer (DST): UTC+4:30 (IRDT)

Kadkhodalu-ye Pain (Persian: كدخدالوپائين, also Romanized as Kadkhodālū-ye Pā’īn; also known as Hāshemābād) is a village in Bastamlu Rural District, in the Central District of Khoda Afarin County, East Azerbaijan Province, Iran. At the 2006 census, its population was 40, in 8 families.
