= Neyestan, Kerman =

Neyestan نيستان
- Village
- Location within Iran
- Coordinates: 28°39′52″N 58°19′16″E
- Country: Iran
- Province: Kerman
- County: Narmashir
- Bakhsh: Rud Ab
- Rural District: Rud Ab-e Gharbi

Population (2006)
  - Total: 41
- Time zone: UTC+3:30 (IRST)
  - Summer (DST): UTC+4:30 (IRDT)

Neyestan (Persian: نيستان, also Romanized as Neyestān; also known as Neyestān-Fannūj) is a village in Rud Ab-e Gharbi Rural District, Rud Ab District, Narmashir County, Kerman Province, Iran. At the 2006 census, its population was 41, in 9 families.
