= Chaker Zehi =

Chaker Zehi چاكرزهي
- Village
- Location within Iran
- Coordinates: 25°33′51″N 61°09′23″E
- Country: Iran
- Province: Sistan and Baluchestan
- County: Chabahar
- Bakhsh: Polan
- Rural District: Polan

Population (2006)
  - Total: 161
- Time zone: UTC+3:30 (IRST)
  - Summer (DST): UTC+4:30 (IRDT)

Chaker Zehi (Persian: چاكرزهي, also Romanized as Chāker Zehī and Chākar Zehī; also known as Chākar Zā’ī, Chākarzī, Chāker Zā’ī) is a village in Polan Rural District, Polan District, Chabahar County, Sistan and Baluchestan Province, Iran. At the 2006 census, its population was 161, in 27 families.
