= Hashemabad, Kharameh =

Hashemabad هاشم اباد
- Village
- Location within Iran
- Coordinates: 29°38′39″N 53°08′31″E
- Country: Iran
- Province: Fars
- County: Kharameh
- Bakhsh: Central
- Rural District: Dehqanan

Population (2006)
  - Total: 148
- Time zone: UTC+3:30 (IRST)
  - Summer (DST): UTC+4:30 (IRDT)

Hashemabad (Persian: هاشم اباد, also Romanized as Hāshemābād; also known as Qal‘eh Now) is a village in Dehqanan Rural District, in the Central District of Kharameh County, Fars province, Iran. At the 2006 census, its population was 148, in 36 families.
