= Chakeri, Kerman =

Chakeri چكري
- Village
- Location within Iran
- Coordinates: 27°56′23″N 57°38′31″E
- Country: Iran
- Province: Kerman
- County: Kahnuj
- Bakhsh: Central
- Rural District: Nakhlestan

Population (2006)
  - Total: 347
- Time zone: UTC+3:30 (IRST)
  - Summer (DST): UTC+4:30 (IRDT)

Chakeri (Persian: چكري, also Romanized as Chakerī) is a village in Nakhlestan Rural District, in the Central District of Kahnuj County, Kerman Province, Iran. At the 2006 census, its population was 347, in 77 families.

== Sister Cities ==
- Chakeri, India
