= Al-Shehri =

al-Shehri (Arabic: الشهري, ash-Shehrī, also transliterated as Alshehri, Shehri, or Shihri) is an Arabic family name denoting a member of Bani Shehr, when followed by a sun letter, the l in al assimilates to the initial consonant of the following noun, resulting in a doubled consonant.

== People ==
- Fouzi Al-Shehri (born 1980), Saudi footballer
- Saleh Al-Shehri (born 1993), Saudi footballer
- Yahya Al-Shehri (born 1990), Saudi footballer

Abdulaziz Alshehri, Saudi actor
