= Boruiyeh, Fars =

Boruiyeh برويه
- Village
- Location within Iran
- Coordinates: 29°58′15″N 54°05′47″E
- Country: Iran
- Province: Fars
- County: Bavanat
- Bakhsh: Sarchehan
- Rural District: Tujerdi

Population (2006)
  - Total: 85
- Time zone: UTC+3:30 (IRST)
  - Summer (DST): UTC+4:30 (IRDT)

Boruiyeh (Persian: برويه, also Romanized as Borūīyeh; also known as Būrrū’īyeh) is a village in Tujerdi Rural District, Sarchehan District, Bavanat County, Fars province, Iran. At the 2006 census, its population was 85, in 20 families.
