= Harabarjan Rural District =

Rural district in Yazd province, Iran

Harabarjan Rural District Persian: دهستان هرابرجان
- Rural District
- Location within Iran
- Coordinates: 30°18′25″N 54°14′15″E
- Country: Iran
- Province: Yazd
- County: Marvast
- District: Central
- Capital: Harabarjan

Population (2016)
  - Total: 3,247
- Time zone: UTC+3:30 (IRST)

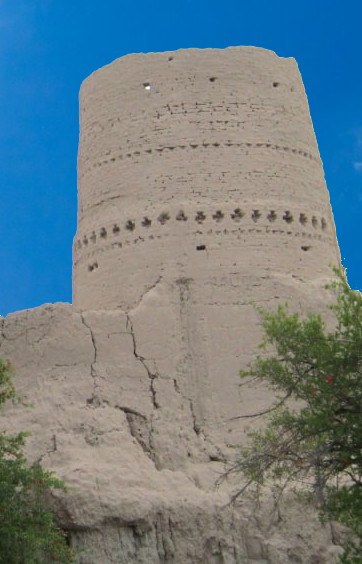
Harabarjan Tower office dating back to the Zand Afsharid era

Harabarjan Rural District (Persian: دهستان هرابرجان) is in the Central District (Note: Formerly Marvast District of Khatam County) of Marvast County, Yazd province, Iran. Its capital is the village of Harabarjan.

== Demographics ==
=== Population ===
At the time of the 2006 National Census, the rural district's population (as a part of Marvast District (Note: Renamed the Central District of Marvast County) in Khatam County) was 2,686 in 786 households. There were 2,462 inhabitants in 704 households at the following census of 2011. The 2016 census measured the population of the rural district as 3,247 in 1,007 households. The most populous of its 175 villages was Torkan, with 1,332 people.

After the census, the district was separated from the county in the establishment of Marvast County and renamed the Central District.
