= Hashemabad, Hormozgan =

Hashemabad هاشم اباد
- Village
- Location within Iran
- Coordinates: 28°08′45″N 55°47′00″E
- Country: Iran
- Province: Hormozgan
- County: Hajjiabad
- Bakhsh: Central
- Rural District: Tarom

Population (2006)
  - Total: 562
- Time zone: UTC+3:30 (IRST)
  - Summer (DST): UTC+4:30 (IRDT)

Hashemabad (Persian: هاشم اباد, also Romanized as Hāshemābād; also known as Hāshemābād-e Patkū’īyeh) is a village in Tarom Rural District, in the Central District of Hajjiabad County, Hormozgan Province, Iran. At the 2006 census, its population was 562, in 157 families.
