= Neyestan, Birjand =

Neyestan نیستان
- Village
- Location within Iran
- Coordinates: 33°01′33″N 59°23′16″E
- Country: Iran
- Province: South Khorasan
- County: Birjand
- Bakhsh: Central
- Rural District: Kahshang

Population (2016)
  - Total: 65
- Time zone: UTC+3:30 (IRST)
  - Summer (DST): UTC+4:30 (IRDT)

Neyestan (Persian: نيستان, also Romanized as Neyestān; also known as Unisun and Ūnīūn) is a village in Kahshang Rural District, in the Central District of Birjand County, South Khorasan Province, Iran. At the 2016 census, its population was 65, in 22 families.
