= Hashemabad, Lorestan =

Hashemabad هاشم آباد
- Village
- Location within Iran
- Coordinates: 34°03′27″N 47°54′02″E
- Country: Iran
- Province: Lorestan
- County: Delfan
- Bakhsh: Central
- Rural District: Nurabad

Population (2006)
  - Total: 185
- Time zone: UTC+3:30 (IRST)
  - Summer (DST): UTC+4:30 (IRDT)

Hashemabad (Persian: هاشم آباد, also Romanized as Hāshemābād) is a village in Nurabad Rural District, in the Central District of Delfan County, Lorestan Province, Iran. At the 2006 census, its population was 185, in 48 families.
