= Bakhtiari rug =

Art form of the Bakhtiari tribe

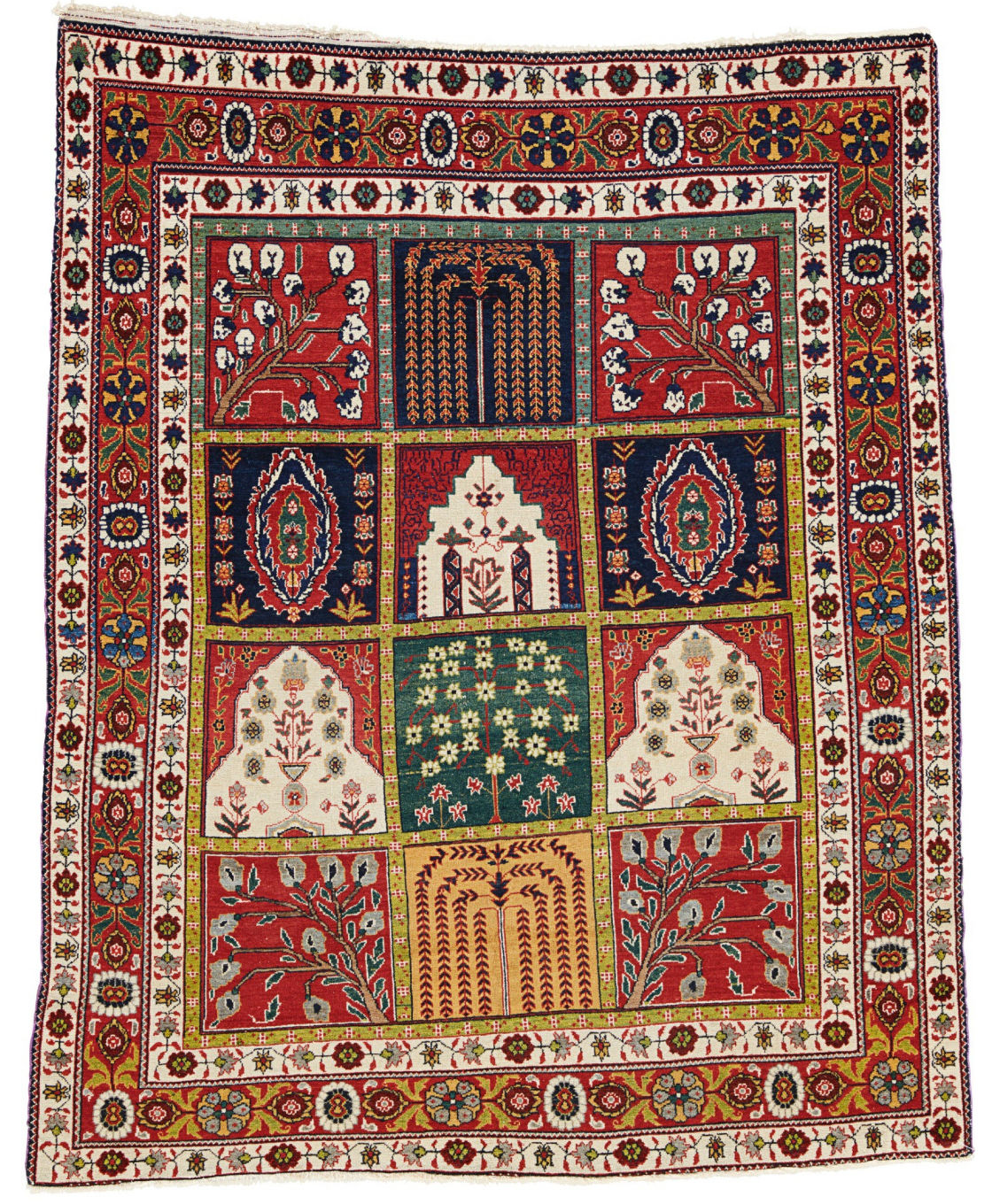

The Bakhtiari rug, along with other weavings, is a major artform of the Bakhtiari tribe, located in Chahar Mahaal and Bakhtiari, Iran. Since the early 19th century, Bakhtiari rugs have been exported around the world.

== Geography ==
While originally woven by nomadic Bakhtiari, most authentic Bakhtiari rugs are woven in Bakhtiari settled communities in west central Iran southwest of Isfahan in Chahar Mahaal and Bakhtiari, as well as parts of the provinces of Isfahan, Lorestan, and eastern Khuzestan, most notably in the town of Shahr-Kurd. Bakhtiari rugs were also known after their place of origin, such as Saman or Hureh (Hori). However, Bakhtiari patterns are copied in other weaving centers in Iran, Pakistan, India and China; the location-based name often refers to the place of origin of the pattern and the quality of the rug, rather than to its place of actual manufacture. Saman and Hori are now regarded as grades of Bakhtiari rugs, rather than as geographical terms.

== Structure ==
Bakhtiari carpets are based on a cotton foundation (warp) with a wool weft usually taken from the herds of the producing tribe. This leads to unique carpets that differ depending on the characteristics of each tribe's wool. The wool can range from dull to extreme glossy and the resultant pile is clipped medium to high. The best carpets with the highest knot density are often known as Bibibaff. (Note: The word baff means knot and bibi is the name for a respected grandmother, hence "skilled".) Prices range considerably with the highest knot density rugs generally being the most expensive, but price is also affected by criteria such as the pattern and the dyes used. Chapel Shotur and Saman pieces are rated slightly beneath Bibibaff productions, but are still considered to be good to excellent. Hori carpets are of looser weave and inferior quality and as such, are generally widely affordable.

The sizes vary from narrow hall carpets to large room designs, often up to 4 m × 5 m. The larger rugs tend to be very rare and harder to come by. Similarly, older rugs, often coveted by collectors, can be extremely costly.

== Patterns ==
Patterns are usually floral or garden inspired. The Khesti, an established garden motif, is perhaps the most well-known rug design. The carpet is divided into individual squares with animals and plants acting as symbols. Another influential design features a decorated field with lattice designs and floral ornaments.

== Colors ==
The use of colors varies depending on styles of certain tribes. Generally they include shades of white, reds, browns, greens, and yellows. Blue does not appear to feature. Natural dyes produce variations in color, which are particularly obvious on older Bibibaffs.
