= Marvast =

City in Yazd province, Iran

Marvast Persian: مروست
- City
- Location within Iran
- Coordinates: 30°28′39″N 54°12′46″E
- Country: Iran
- Province: Yazd
- County: Marvast
- District: Central

Area
  - Total: 3.1 km^{2} (1.2 sq mi)

Population (2016)
  - Total: 9,379
  - Density: 3,000/km^{2} (7,800/sq mi)
- Time zone: UTC+3:30 (IRST)
- Website: www.marvast.org

Marvast (Persian: مروست) (Note: Also known as Dabestān-e Khvājeh Marvast and Marvas) is a city in the Central District (Note: Formerly Marvast District of Khatam County) of Marvast County, Yazd province, Iran, serving as capital of both the county and the district.

== History ==
From the block between Shiraz and Yazd, the northern boundary of the pomegranate is east of Babak, south of Herat and west of Fars province. Its center is the Marvast Caspian, with 4 villages and an area of 8 mins and a population of 3. From the middle of north Fars block and east of Shiraz its length from Taj Abad to Sahaf field is 14 Farsokh and its width from two farther east and north is limited to Babak Kerman block and from Maghreb to Bavanat block and from south to Nairiz block. The blockhouse is also called Marvst. Pars Province is five yards.

Every court has read of the monastery which its institution had begun in its beginning, that is to say, the furnace of furnace, the furnace of al-Bjerd, and the towns of this furnace (furnace of furnace). Bowen is a town with a jumble and pulpit and a river with fruit and canvas. As its trees are like a bush, it is close to Kerman and its climate is temperate, with running water and prosperity. Herat village center - Marvast, Shahr Babak district, Yazd city, located in the northwest of Shahr Babak, near the Shawaz Yazd road to Marvast, with 2 tons of water from the aqueduct and its cereal crop. (Political Geography of the Universe)

Asadullah Fazel Mazandarani writes: "Marvast was a large block in the Fars province on the Kerman border, bounded on the west by Bavanat and on the south by Niriz and its center is the village of Marvast. This was an important village in Malek especially Mirza Mahmoud Afnan. Seven people were reported in the village of Marvast in year 9."

Marvast is a vast land with very valuable and authentic archaeological remains, a large cemetery and monuments found in Hamedan and Fakhrabad castles and other areas of Marvast, Marvast has been a part of the Fars block since the early Qajar period and was annexed to Jahanshah Qaraqviunlu in the year AH Marwast and then joined Yazd province for a number of years. It is from these two regions that people nowadays have a close connection This section is adjacent to the neighboring area of the province of Bavat Fars and daily people of these areas to do banking, health and shopping and to the city of Marvast and people came to these areas to use natural and recreational resources dependence and many connections.

It has been well established in these areas and the people of the city of Marvast, and since the work of most people in the city of Marvast is agricultural and the catchment of the Marvast dams is promoted by this region and especially in the cultural, dialectic, daily necessities and intervals. Communication shortcuts all indicate that Marous With a long history and authentic culture and with excellent capacities and resources, as well as the regional situation and cultural, social, natural, political and other resources that have been comprehensively and fully described below, the competence needed for development and promotion, further development.

== Demographics ==
=== Population ===
At the time of the 2006 National Census, the city's population was 7,585 in 1,966 households, when it was in Marvast District (Note: Renamed the Central District of Marvast County) of Khatam County. The following census in 2011 counted 8,865 people in 2,437 households. The 2016 census measured the population of the city as 9,379 people in 2,790 households.

After the census, the district was separated from the county in the establishment of Marvast County and renamed the Central District with Marvast as the new county's capital.

== Geography ==
=== Mountainous area ===
This area is at the bottom of the Zagros Mountains. There are also caves such as the House of God Cave, Lee Dark, Baba Zahid, Korah Springs and 2500-year-old Karakhan Karangan and Alley of gardens in Chenarnaz village in Isar Marvast village is one of the tourist attractions of the region. 2- Plain and Desert: Rhubarb Plain and the flowers of Arsalan and Salt Lake, as well as the delhi hills (sandy hills) in the eastern part of Marvast, which is about 5 times the height of Mount Rig Mehriz, is one of the most beautiful and unique attractions of Marvast.

== Historic and natural attractions ==
Marvast is located 2 kilometers from the center of the province and has two districts: Herarbanjan and Isar.

=== Tourist Attractions ===
Marvast has four historical valuable textures, including Marvast Cultural Historical Texture, Turquoise Historical and Cultural Texture, and each historical and cultural context of approximately 5 hectares.

There are also two villages of tourist destination, including Karokhanan and Chenarnaz, in the Marvast area, which is about 2 km from Marvast, and the historic village of Mobarkeh is located 2 km from the Marvast town and the beautiful white salt lake is 2 km away.

The villages of Karokhan and Chenarnaz are located in the mountainous areas of the region. There are monuments of historical value in the city including Marvast Historical Castle, Marvast Branch Caravan, Sheikh Abdullah Marvast Monument, Mobarka Castle, Studoon Karkhangan and the historic gardens in Marvast and the villages of Turkan and Herbarjan as well as numerous towers and towers.

Barrow and Bath are other tourist attractions and potentials of the city that we will continue to introduce. The women's hilltop (Water Mountain), water mill, Merwast Garden, Salt Lake are other attractions of this area.

=== Marvast Castle ===
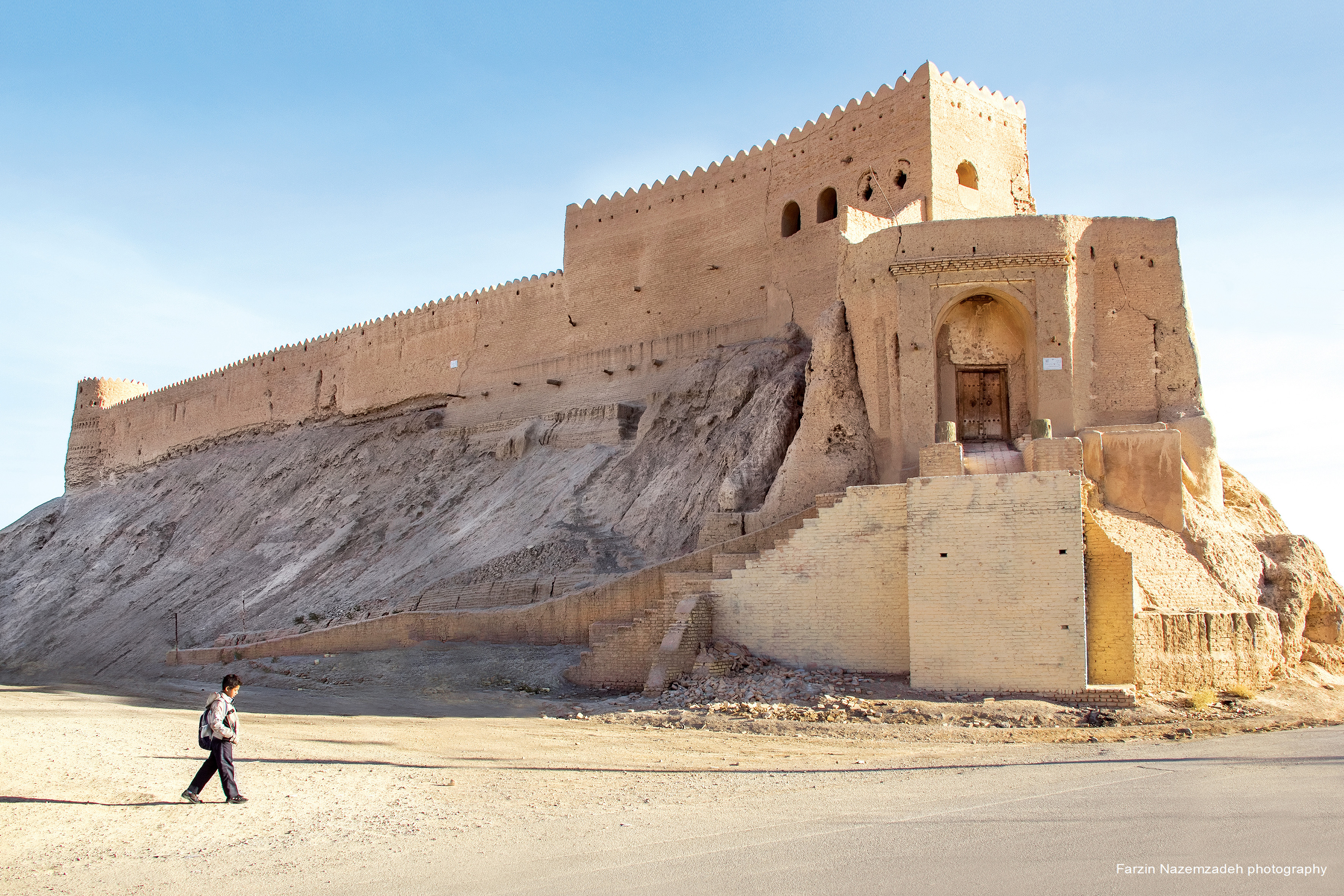

The fortress of Marvast dates back to pre-Islam. The castle is built of clay and masonry materials and the use of brick in the head is over the tall and overlooking the city of Marvast. The castle has three circular towers in three corners. Instead of a tower on the southwest side of the castle, head to the castle entrance. The head of the castle is built on two floors, the roof of the first floor is completely collapsed and only its bases are left.

The highlight of the building and its aristocracy to the city and its attractions and views from far away and on entering Marvast are one of the hallmarks of this building. Agricultural products of this region include wheat, barley, maize, grapes, pistachios and pomegranates. This city is the most important agricultural center of Yazd province and one of the main areas of grape production in Iran.

== Culture ==
The culture of the Marvast area is influenced by the culture of Kerman, Fars and Yazd. It was mentioned earlier that the name of Mervast in the historical texts was due to the existence of many castles and the great amount of monuments that indicate its extent and prosperity in the past has been known as Darwalkalat, which so far has more than 3 historical monuments in the city of Mervast. The national monuments have been registered.

In spite of the many cultural and historical monuments recorded in the Marvast area, there are many nature resorts in the nature of the area, which annually witness the presence of many guests, compatriots and citizens. Among the natural and remarkable recreational areas are the over 2,000 year-old deer, forests with a variety of forest plants, shrubs, Arsalan flowers, a white lake and a salt lake.
