= Bəxtiyarlı =

Bəxtiyarlı Բարկուշատ
- Location within Azerbaijan
- Coordinates: 39°23′17″N 46°32′01″E
- Country: Azerbaijan
- Rayon: Qubadli
- Time zone: UTC+4 (AZT)
  - Summer (DST): UTC+5 (AZT)

Bəxtiyarlı (also, Bakhtiyarly), known in Armenian as Barkushat (Armenian: Բարկուշատ) is a ghost village in the Qubadli Rayon of Azerbaijan. Video footage released in March 2021 show that almost every building if the village has been left in ruins for what appears to be a very substantial period of time, as is common amongst those Azeri settlements that were occupied by Armenia between 1993 and 2020.
