= Isar Rural District =

Rural district in Yazd province, Iran

Isar Rural District Persian: دهستان ايثار
- Rural District
- Location within Iran
- Coordinates: 30°05′36″N 54°00′05″E
- Country: Iran
- Province: Yazd
- County: Marvast
- District: Isar
- Capital: Korkhongan

Population (2016)
  - Total: 2,524
- Time zone: UTC+3:30 (IRST)

Isar Rural District (Persian: دهستان ايثار) is in Isar District of Marvast County, Yazd province, Iran. Its capital is the village of Korkhongan.

== Demographics ==
=== Population ===
At the time of the 2006 National Census, the rural district's population (as a part of Marvast District (Note: Renamed the Central District of Marvast County) in Khatam County) was 2,502 in 622 households. There were 2,621 inhabitants in 682 households at the following census of 2011. The 2016 census measured the population of the rural district as 2,524 in 721 households. The most populous of its 32 villages was Korkhongan, with 1,488 people.

After the census, the district was separated from the county in the establishment of Marvast County and renamed the Central District. The rural district was transferred to the new Isar District.
