= Hashemabad, Ilam =

Hashemabad هاشم اباد
- Village
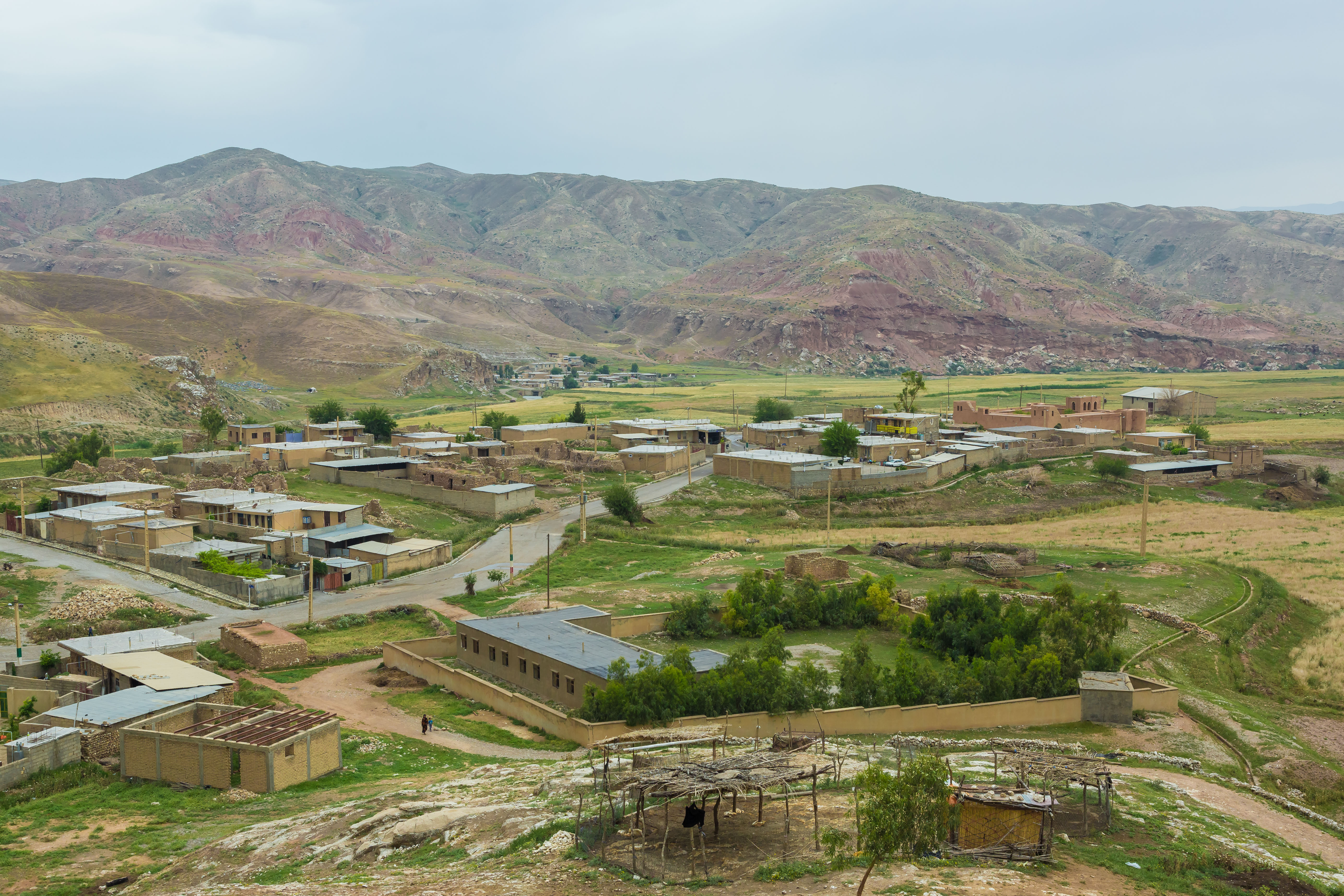
- Hashemabad, Ilam

- Location within Iran
- Coordinates: 33°08′51″N 47°19′48″E
- Country: Iran
- Province: Ilam
- County: Darreh Shahr
- Bakhsh: Central
- Rural District: Zarrin Dasht

Population (2006)
  - Total: 213
- Time zone: UTC+3:30 (IRST)
  - Summer (DST): UTC+4:30 (IRDT)

Hashemabad (Persian: هاشم اباد, also Romanized as Hashemābād; also known as Sīkān) is a village in Zarrin Dasht Rural District, in the Central District of Darreh Shahr County, Ilam Province, Iran. At the 2006 census, its population was 213, in 50 families. The village is populated by Kurds.
