= Banaruiyeh Rural District =

Rural district in Fars province, Iran

Banaruiyeh Rural District Persian: دهستان بنارویه
- Rural District
- Location within Iran
- Coordinates: 28°01′02″N 54°06′50″E
- Country: Iran
- Province: Fars
- County: Larestan
- District: Banaruiyeh
- Capital: Banaruiyeh

Population (2016)
  - Total: 3,339
- Time zone: UTC+3:30 (IRST)

Banaruiyeh Rural District (Persian: دهستان بنارویه) is in Banaruiyeh District of Larestan County, (Note: Formerly Lar County) Fars province, Iran. It is administered from the city of Banaruiyeh.

== Demographics ==
=== Population ===
At the time of the 2006 National Census, the rural district's population was 3,890 in 941 households. There were 4,427 inhabitants in 1,059 households at the following census of 2011. The 2016 census measured the population of the rural district as 3,339 in 1,036 households. The most populous of its 42 villages was Sharafuyeh, with 2,345 people.
