= Marvast County =

County in Yazd province, Iran

Marvast County Persian: شهرستان مروست
- County
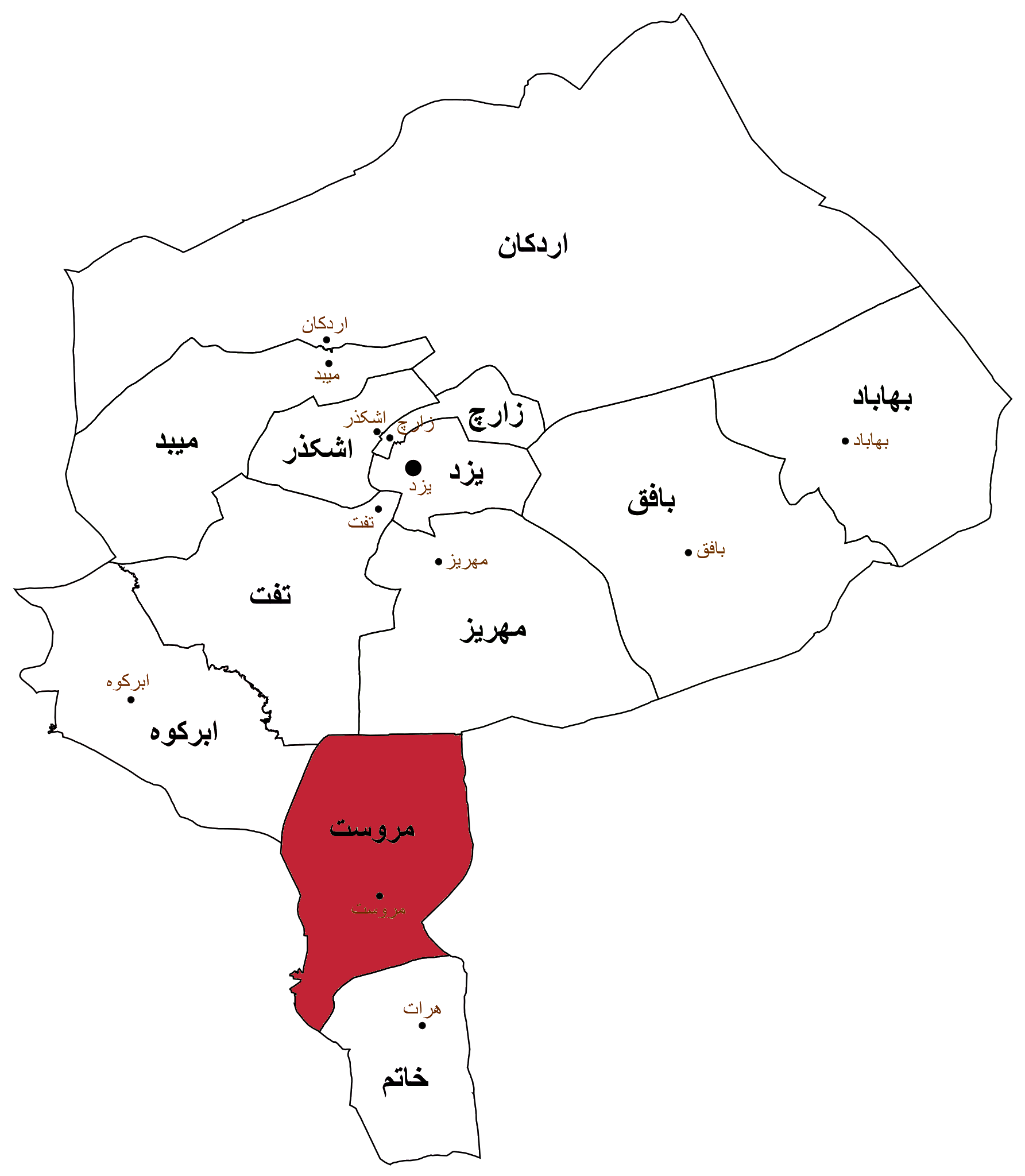
- Location of Marvast County in Yazd province

- Location of Yazd province in Iran
- Coordinates: 30°30′N 54°12′E
- Country: Iran
- Province: Yazd
- Capital: Marvast
- Districts: Central, Isar
- Time zone: UTC+3:30 (IRST)

Marvast County (Persian: شهرستان مروست) is in Yazd province, Iran. Its capital is the city of Marvast, whose population at the time of the 2016 National Census was 9,379 in 2,790 households.

== History ==
After the 2016 census, Marvast District (Note: Renamed the Central District of Marvast County) was separated from Khatam County in the establishment of Marvast County and renamed the Central District. The new county was divided into two districts of two rural districts each, with Marvast as its capital and only city at the time.

== Demographics ==
=== Administrative divisions ===
Marvast County's administrative structure is shown in the following table.

Marvast County
Administrative Divisions
Central District (Note: Formerly Marvast District of Khatam County)
Harabarjan RD
Mobarakeh RD
Marvast (city)
Isar District
Isar RD
Tutak RD
RD = Rural District

== See also ==
Media related to Marvast County at Wikimedia Commons
