= Fathabad Rural District (Khatam County) =

Rural district in Yazd province, Iran

Fathabad Rural District Persian: دهستان فتح آباد
- Rural District
- Location within Iran
- Coordinates: 30°02′36″N 54°18′00″E
- Country: Iran
- Province: Yazd
- County: Khatam
- District: Central
- Capital: Fathabad

Population (2016)
  - Total: 2,319
- Time zone: UTC+3:30 (IRST)

Fathabad Rural District (Persian: دهستان فتح آباد) is in the Central District of Khatam County, Yazd province, Iran. Its capital is the village of Fathabad.

== Demographics ==
=== Population ===
At the time of the 2006 National Census, the rural district's population was 2,753 in 710 households. There were 2,793 inhabitants in 722 households at the following census of 2011. The 2016 census measured the population of the rural district as 2,319 in 702 households. The most populous of its 85 villages was Fathabad, with 497 people.
