= Central District (Marvast County) =

District in Yazd province, Iran

Central District (Marvast County) Persian: بخش مرکزی شهرستان مروست
- District
- Location within Iran
- Coordinates: 30°37′19″N 54°12′10″E
- Country: Iran
- Province: Yazd
- County: Marvast
- Capital: Marvast

Population (2016)
  - Total: 15,150 (Note: As Marvast District of Khatam County)
- Time zone: UTC+3:30 (IRST)

The Central District of Marvast County (Persian: بخش مرکزی شهرستان مروست) (Note: Formerly Marvast District (بخش مروست) of Khatam County) is in Yazd province, Iran. Its capital is the city of Marvast.

== History ==
After the 2016 census, Marvast District (Note: Renamed the Central District of Marvast County) was separated from Khatam County in the establishment of Marvast County and renamed the Central District. The new county was divided into two districts of two rural districts each, with Marvast as its capital and only city at the time.

== Demographics ==
=== Population ===
At the time of the 2006 census, the district's population (as Marvast District of Khatam County) was 12,773 in 3,374 households. The following census in 2011 counted 13,948 people in 3,823 households. The 2016 census measured the population of the district as 15,150 inhabitants in 4,518 households.

=== Administrative divisions ===
Central District (Marvast County) (Note: As Marvast District of Khatam County at the 2006, 2011, and 2016 censuses)
Administrative Divisions	2006	2011	2016
Harabarjan RD	2,686	2,462	3,247
Isar RD (Note: Transferred to Isar District after the 2016 census)	2,502	2,621	2,524
Mobarakeh RD (Note: Established after the 2016 census)			
Marvast (city)	7,585	8,865	9,379
Total	12,773	13,948	15,150
RD = Rural District
