= Banaruiyeh District =

District in Fars province, Iran

Banaruiyeh District Persian: بخش بنارویه
- District
- Location within Iran
- Coordinates: 28°02′41″N 53°57′24″E
- Country: Iran
- Province: Fars
- County: Larestan
- Capital: Banaruiyeh

Population (2016)
  - Total: 16,723
- Time zone: UTC+3:30 (IRST)

Banaruiyeh District (Persian: بخش بنارویه) is in Larestan County, (Note: Formerly Lar County) Fars province, Iran. Its capital is the city of Banaruiyeh.

== Demographics ==
=== Population ===
At the time of the 2006 National Census, the district's population was 17,174 in 3,710 households. The following census in 2011 counted 19,321 people in 4,976 households. The 2016 census measured the population of the district as 16,723 inhabitants in 4,858 households.

=== Administrative divisions ===
Banaruiyeh District Population
Administrative Divisions	2006	2011	2016
Banaruiyeh RD	3,890	4,427	3,339
Deh Fish RD	3,966	3,917	4,307
Banaruiyeh (city)	9,318	10,977	9,077
Total	17,174	19,321	16,723
RD = Rural District
