= Chahak Rural District =

Rural district in Yazd province, Iran

Chahak Rural District Persian: دهستان چاهک
- Rural District
- Location within Iran
- Coordinates: 29°47′31″N 54°20′05″E
- Country: Iran
- Province: Yazd
- County: Khatam
- District: Chahak
- Capital: Chahak

Population (2016)
  - Total: 6,057
- Time zone: UTC+3:30 (IRST)

Chahak Rural District (Persian: دهستان چاهک) is in Chahak District of Khatam County, Yazd province, Iran. Its capital is the village of Chahak.

== Demographics ==
=== Population ===
At the time of the 2006 National Census, the rural district's population (as a part of the Central District) was 5,374 in 1,309 households. There were 6,025 inhabitants in 1,626 households at the following census of 2011. The 2016 census measured the population of the rural district as 6,057 in 1,758 households. The most populous of its 91 villages was Chahak, with 2,947 people.

After the census, the rural district was separated from the district in the formation of Chahak District.
