= Central District (Khatam County) =

District in Yazd province, Iran

Central District (Khatam County) Persian: بخش مرکزی شهرستان خاتم
- District
- Location within Iran
- Coordinates: 30°02′36″N 54°18′00″E
- Country: Iran
- Province: Yazd
- County: Khatam
- Capital: Herat

Population (2016)
  - Total: 21,408
- Time zone: UTC+3:30 (IRST)

The Central District of Khatam County (Persian: بخش مرکزی شهرستان خاتم) is in Yazd province, Iran. Its capital is the city of Herat.

== History ==
After the 2016 National Census, Chahak Rural District was separated from the district in the formation of Chahak District.

== Demographics ==
=== Population ===
At the time of the 2006 census, the district's population was 18,922 in 4,770 households. The following census in 2011 counted 21,210 people in 5,705 households. The 2016 census measured the population of the district as 21,408 inhabitants in 6,292 households.

=== Administrative divisions ===
Central District (Khatam County) Population
Administrative Divisions	2006	2011	2016
Chahak RD (Note: Transferred to Chahak District after the 2016 census)	5,374	6,025	6,057
Fathabad RD	2,753	2,793	2,319
Herat (city)	10,795	12,392	13,032
Total	18,922	21,210	21,408
RD = Rural District
