= Khatam County =

County in Yazd province, Iran

Khatam County Persian: شهرستان خاتم
- County
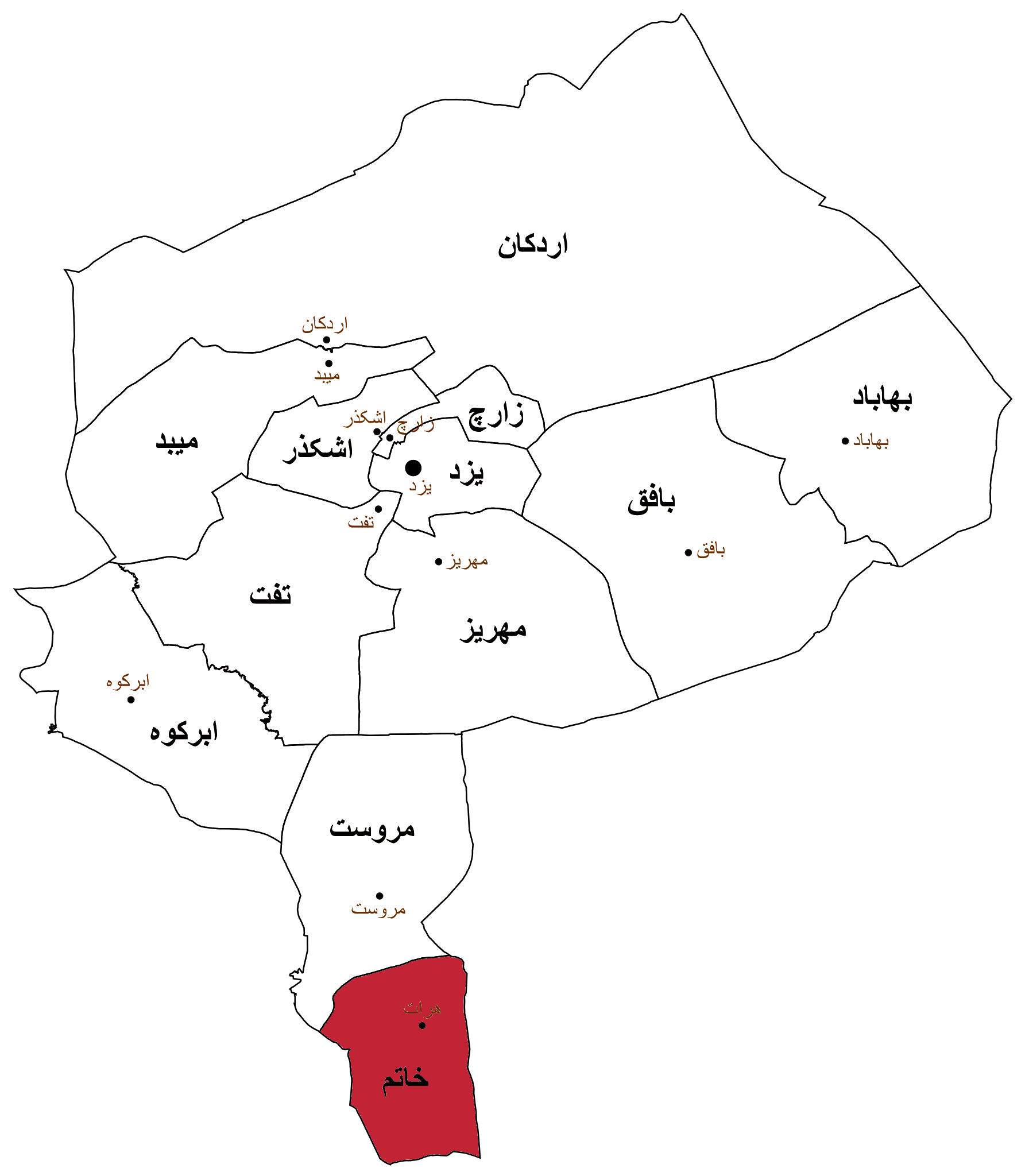
- Location of Khatam County in Yazd province

- Location of Yazd province in Iran
- Coordinates: 29°55′N 54°20′E
- Country: Iran
- Province: Yazd
- Capital: Herat
- Districts: Central, Chahak

Population (2016)
  - Total: 36,562
- Time zone: UTC+3:30 (IRST)

Khatam County (Persian: شهرستان خاتم) is in Yazd province, Iran. Its capital is the city of Herat.

== History ==
After the 2016 National Census, Marvast District (Note: Renamed the Central District of Marvast County) was separated from the county in the establishment of Marvast County and renamed the Central District. Chahak Rural District was separated from the Central District of Khatam County in the formation of Chahak District, including the new Shahriari Rural District.

== Demographics ==
=== Population ===
At the time of the 2006 census, the county's population was 31,695 in 8,144 households. The following census in 2011 counted 35,158 people in 9,512 households. The 2016 census measured the population of the county as 36,562 in 10,811 households.

=== Administrative divisions ===
Khatam County's population history and administrative structure over three consecutive censuses are shown in the following table.

Khatam County Population
| Administrative Divisions | 2006 | 2011 | 2016 |
|---|---|---|---|
| Central District | 18,922 | 21,210 | 21,408 |
| Chahak RD | 5,374 | 6,025 | 6,057 |
| Fathabad RD | 2,753 | 2,793 | 2,319 |
| Herat (city) | 10,795 | 12,392 | 13,032 |
| Chahak District (Note: Established after the 2016 census) | | | |
| Chahak RD | | | |
| Shahriari RD | | | |
| Marvast District (Note: Transferred to Marvast County after the 2016 census and renamed the Central District) | 12,773 | 13,948 | 15,150 |
| Harabarjan RD | 2,686 | 2,462 | 3,247 |
| Isar RD | 2,502 | 2,621 | 2,524 |
| Marvast (city) | 7,585 | 8,865 | 9,379 |
| Total | 31,695 | 35,158 | 36,562 |
RD = Rural District

== See also ==
Media related to Khatam County at Wikimedia Commons
