= Aghcheh Qeshlaq =

Aghcheh Qeshlaq (Persian: اغچه قشلاق), also rendered as Aqcheh Qeshlaq, may refer to various places in Iran:

- Aghcheh Qeshlaq, Ardabil
- Aghcheh Qeshlaq-e Olya, Ardabil
- Aghcheh Qeshlaq-e Sofla, Ardabil Province
- Aghcheh Qeshlaq, East Azerbaijan
- Aghcheh Qeshlaq, alternate name of Agh Qeshlaq, Meyaneh, East Azerbaijan Province
- Aghcheh Qeshlaq, Qazvin
- Aghcheh Qeshlaq, West Azerbaijan
