= Sanjabad =

Sanjabad (Persian: سنجبد) may refer to:

- Sanjabad, Ardabil
- Sanjabad-e Gharbi Rural District
- Sanjabad-e Jonubi Rural District
- Sanjabad-e Sharqi Rural District
- Sanjabad-e Shomali Rural District
