= Khalkhal and Kowsar (electoral district) =

Constituency of the Iranian parliament

- Electoral district constituency for the Ardabil
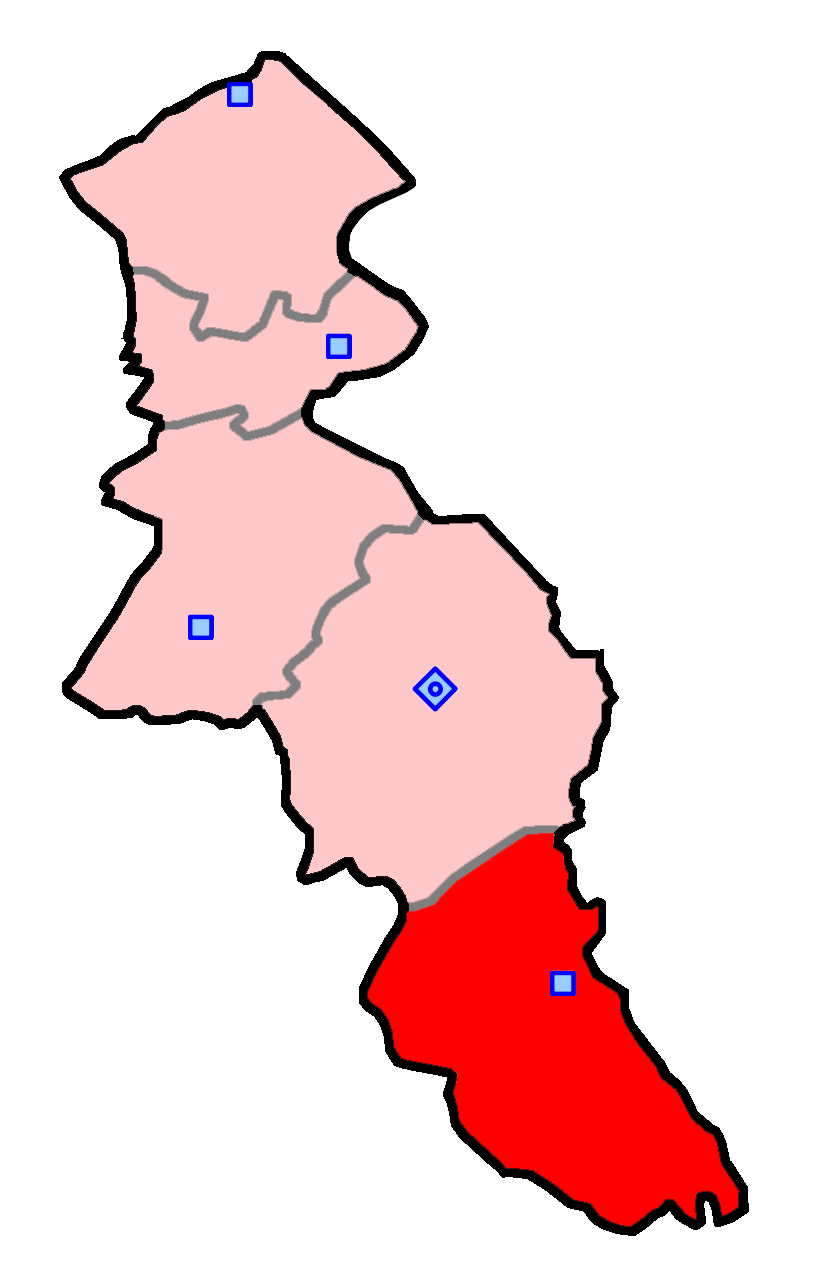
- khalkhal and Kivi shown within Ardabil Province
- Ardabil Province: Khalkhal County and Kowsar County

Current constituency
- Assembly Members: Bashir Khaleghi

Khalkhal and Kowsar (electoral district) is the 4th electoral district in the Ardabil Province Of Iran. It has a population of 118,530 and elects 1 member of parliament.

== 1980 ==
MP in 1980 from the electorate of Khalkhal. (1st)

- Ghafour Sadegh-Khalkhali

== 1984 ==
MP in 1984 from the electorate of Khalkhal. (2nd)

- Motahhar Kazemi

== 1988 ==
MPs in 1988 from the electorate of Khalkhal. (3rd)

- Motahhar Kazemi

== 1992 ==
MP in 1992 from the electorate of Khalkhal. (4th)

- Motahhar Kazemi

== 1996 ==
MP in 1996 from the electorate of Khalkhal. (5th)

- Motahhar Kazemi

== 2000 ==
MP in 2000 from the electorate of Khalkhal and Kowsar. (6th)

- Mehrangiz Morovvati

== 2004 ==
MPs in 2004 from the electorate of Khalkhal and Kowsar. (7th)

- Mehrangiz Morovvati

== 2008 ==
MP in 2008 from the electorate of Khalkhal and Kowsar. (8th)

- Bashir Khaleghi

== 2012 ==
MP in 2012 from the electorate of Khalkhal and Kowsar. (9th)

- Jalil Jafari

== 2016 ==
2016 Iranian legislative election
#	Candidate	List(s)	Votes	%
	Bashir Khaleghi	Independent politician	19,120	
