= Gorgabad =

Gorgabad (Persian: گرگ اباد or گرگ آباد) may refer to:

- Gorgabad, Ardabil
- Gorgabad, Kerman
- Gorgabad, West Azerbaijan
