= Gazvar =

Gazvar or Gazur (Persian: گزوار or گزور) may refer to:

- Gazur, Ardabil
- Gazvar-e Olya, Ardabil Province
- Gazvar-e Sofla, Ardabil Province
- Gazvar, Semnan
- Gazur, Sistan and Baluchestan
