= Bashir Khaleghi =

- بشیر خالقی

Member of Parliament of Iran
- In office 28 May 2016 – 26 May 2020
- Preceded by: Jalil Jafari
- Constituency: Khalkhal and Kowsar
- Majority: 19,120
- In office 20 May 2008 – 28 May 2012
- Preceded by: Mehrangiz Morovvati
- Succeeded by: Jalil Jafari
- Constituency: Khalkhal and Kowsar
- Majority: 14,547

Personal details
- Born: 1961 (age 64–65) Khalkhal Iran
- Party: Principlists
- Education: University of Tabriz

Bashir Khaleghi (Persian: ‌بشیر خالقی) is an Iranian politician and pediatrician. He was born in Khalkhal, Ardabil province. He was a member of the eighth legislative election and Khaleghi is MP of tenth Islamic Consultative Assembly from the electorate of Khalkhal and Kowsar.
