= Zaviyeh-ye Zarjabad =

Village in Ardabil province, Iran

Zaviyeh-ye Zarjabad Persian: زاويه زرج اباد
- Village
- Location within Iran
- Coordinates: 37°36′36″N 48°05′00″E
- Country: Iran
- Province: Ardabil
- County: Kowsar
- District: Firuz
- Rural District: Zarjabad

Population (2016)
  - Total: 100
- Time zone: UTC+3:30 (IRST)

Zaviyeh-ye Zarjabad (Persian: زاويه زرج اباد) (Note: Also romanized as Zāvīyeh-ye Zarajābād and Zāvīyeh-ye Zarjābād; also known as Zāvīyeh) is a village in Zarjabad Rural District of Firuz District in Kowsar County, Ardabil province, Iran.

== Demographics ==
=== Population ===
At the time of the 2006 National Census, the village's population was 233 in 46 households. The following census in 2011 counted 143 people in 42 households. The 2016 census measured the population of the village as 100 people in 35 households.
