= Ala ol Din, Ardabil =

Village in Ardabil province, Iran

Ala ol Din Persian: علاءالدین
- Village
- Location within Iran
- Coordinates: 37°32′13″N 48°12′55″E
- Country: Iran
- Province: Ardabil
- County: Kowsar
- District: Firuz
- Rural District: Sanjabad-e Jonubi

Population (2016)
  - Total: 22
- Time zone: UTC+3:30 (IRST)

Ala ol Din (Persian: علاءالدین) (Note: Also romanized as ‘Alā' od Dīn, A‘lā od Dīn, and A‘lā ol Dīn; also known as Ālādīn) is a village in Sanjabad-e Jonubi Rural District of Firuz District in Kowsar County, Ardabil province, Iran.

== Demographics ==
=== Population ===
At the time of the 2006 National Census, the village's population was 186 in 31 households. The following census in 2011 counted 76 people in 17 households. The 2016 census measured the population of the village as 22 people in eight households.
