= Benamaran =

Village in Ardabil province, Iran

Benamaran Persian: بناماران
- Village
- Location within Iran
- Coordinates: 37°52′59″N 48°28′47″E
- Country: Iran
- Province: Ardabil
- County: Kowsar
- District: Central
- Rural District: Sanjabad-e Shomali

Population (2016)
  - Total: 288
- Time zone: UTC+3:30 (IRST)

Benamaran (Persian: بناماران) (Note: Also romanized as Benamārān; also known as Bīnāmārān) is a village in Sanjabad-e Shomali Rural District of the Central District in Kowsar County, Ardabil province, Iran.

== Demographics ==
=== Population ===
At the time of the 2006 National Census, the village's population was 323 in 67 households. The following census in 2011 counted 303 people in 71 households. The 2016 census measured the population of the village as 288 people in 86 households.
