= Mashkul =

Village in Ardabil province, Iran

Mashkul Persian: مشكول
- Village
- Location within Iran
- Coordinates: 37°29′36″N 48°11′56″E
- Country: Iran
- Province: Ardabil
- County: Kowsar
- District: Firuz
- Rural District: Sanjabad-e Jonubi

Population (2016)
  - Total: 66
- Time zone: UTC+3:30 (IRST)

Mashkul (Persian: مشكول) (Note: Also romanized as Mashkūl; also known as Abvar, Mashgūl, Mashkyu, and Mashkyul’) is a village in Sanjabad-e Jonubi Rural District of Firuz District in Kowsar County, Ardabil province, Iran.

== Demographics ==
=== Population ===
At the time of the 2006 National Census, the village's population was 165 in 36 households. The following census in 2011 counted 145 people in 41 households. The 2016 census measured the population of the village as 66 people in 21 households.
