= Azimabad, Ardabil =

Village in Ardabil province, Iran

Azimabad Persian: عظیم‌آباد
- Village
- Location within Iran
- Coordinates: 37°36′53″N 48°10′24″E
- Country: Iran
- Province: Ardabil
- County: Kowsar
- District: Firuz
- Rural District: Sanjabad-e Jonubi

Population (2016)
  - Total: 20
- Time zone: UTC+3:30 (IRST)

Azimabad (Persian: عظیم‌آباد) (Note: Also romanized as ʿAẓīmābād; also known as A‘z̧amābād and Tītīābād (تی‌تی‌آباد)) is a village in Sanjabad-e Jonubi Rural District of Firuz District in Kowsar County, Ardabil province, Iran.

== Demographics ==
=== Population ===
At the time of the 2006 National Census, the village's population was 23 in seven households. The following census in 2011 counted 24 people in seven households. The 2016 census measured the population of the village as 20 people in six households.
