= Burestan =

Village in Ardabil province, Iran

Burestan Persian: بورستان
- Village
- Location within Iran
- Coordinates: 37°35′27″N 48°07′53″E
- Country: Iran
- Province: Ardabil
- County: Kowsar
- District: Firuz
- Rural District: Zarjabad

Population (2016)
  - Total: 249
- Time zone: UTC+3:30 (IRST)

Burestan (Persian: بورستان) (Note: Also romanized as Būrestān; also known as Burustan) is a village in Zarjabad Rural District of Firuz District in Kowsar County, Ardabil province, Iran.

== Demographics ==
=== Population ===
At the time of the 2006 National Census, the village's population was 486 in 101 households. The following census in 2011 counted 467 people in 122 households. The 2016 census measured the population of the village as 249 people in 80 households.
