= Ganjgah =

Village in Ardabil province, Iran

Ganjgah Persian: گنجگاه
- Village
- Location within Iran
- Coordinates: 37°42′34″N 48°15′30″E
- Country: Iran
- Province: Ardabil
- County: Kowsar
- District: Central
- Rural District: Sanjabad-e Gharbi

Population (2016)
  - Total: 685
- Time zone: UTC+3:30 (IRST)

Ganjgah (Persian: گنجگاه) (Note: Also romanized as Ganjgāh; also known as Janchāy, Jand Chāy, Jandchāi, Jandchāy, and Kandzha) is a village in, and the capital of, Sanjabad-e Gharbi Rural District in the Central District of Kowsar County, Ardabil province, Iran.

== Demographics ==
=== Population ===
At the time of the 2006 National Census, the village's population was 750 in 175 households. The following census in 2011 counted 948 people in 237 households. The 2016 census measured the population of the village as 685 people in 194 households. It was the most populous village in its rural district.
