= Aghcheh Qeshlaq-e Olya =

Aghcheh Qeshlaq-e Olya (Persian: اغچه قشلاق عليا), also rendered as Aqcheh Qeshlaq-e Olya, also known as Aqcheh Qeshlaq-e Bala, may refer to:

- Aghcheh Qeshlaq-e Olya, Ardabil
- Aghcheh Qeshlaq-e Olya, East Azerbaijan
