= Kachal Daraq =

Village in Ardabil province, Iran

Kachal Daraq Persian: كچل درق
- Village
- Location within Iran
- Coordinates: 37°33′11″N 48°09′07″E
- Country: Iran
- Province: Ardabil
- County: Kowsar
- District: Firuz
- Rural District: Sanjabad-e Jonubi

Population (2016)
  - Total: 13
- Time zone: UTC+3:30 (IRST)

Kachal Daraq (Persian: كچل درق) (Note: Also known as Kachal Z̄araq and Kegalyar) is a village in Sanjabad-e Jonubi Rural District of Firuz District in Kowsar County, Ardabil province, Iran.

== Demographics ==
=== Population ===
At the time of the 2006 National Census, the village's population was 25 in five households. The following census in 2011 counted 30 people in seven households. The 2016 census measured the population of the village as 13 people in five households.
