= Pir Zaman =

Village in Ardabil province, Iran

Pir Zaman Persian: پيرزمان
- Village
- Location within Iran
- Coordinates: 37°55′38″N 48°23′19″E
- Country: Iran
- Province: Ardabil
- County: Kowsar
- District: Central
- Rural District: Sanjabad-e Shomali

Population (2016)
  - Total: 33
- Time zone: UTC+3:30 (IRST)

Pir Zaman (Persian: پيرزمان) (Note: Also romanized as Pīr Zamān; also known as Parzaman) is a village in Sanjabad-e Shomali Rural District of the Central District in Kowsar County, Ardabil province, Iran.

== Demographics ==
=== Population ===
At the time of the 2006 National Census, the village's population was 48 in 12 households. The following census in 2011 counted 50 people in 15 households. The 2016 census measured the population of the village as 33 people in nine households.
