= Narlu =

Village in Ardabil province, Iran

Narlu Persian: نرلو
- Village
- Location within Iran
- Coordinates: 37°56′10″N 48°21′45″E
- Country: Iran
- Province: Ardabil
- County: Kowsar
- District: Central
- Rural District: Sanjabad-e Shomali

Population (2016)
  - Total: 63
- Time zone: UTC+3:30 (IRST)

Narlu (Persian: نرلو) (Note: Also romanized as Narlū; also known as Narlī and Tūlī) is a village in Sanjabad-e Shomali Rural District of the Central District in Kowsar County, Ardabil province, Iran.

== Demographics ==
=== Population ===
At the time of the 2006 National Census, the village's population was 69 in 15 households. The following census in 2011 counted 70 people in 20 households. The 2016 census measured the population of the village as 63 people in 16 households.
