= Aftabeh, Ardabil =

Village in Ardabil province, Iran

Aftabeh Persian: افتابه
- Village
- Location within Iran
- Coordinates: 37°40′49″N 48°09′30″E
- Country: Iran
- Province: Ardabil
- County: Kowsar
- District: Central
- Rural District: Sanjabad-e Gharbi

Population (2016)
  - Total: 49
- Time zone: UTC+3:30 (IRST)

Aftabeh (Persian: افتابه) (Note: Also romanized as Āftābeh; also known as Avtafa and Ebrahimabad) is a village in Sanjabad-e Gharbi Rural District within the Central District of Kowsar County, Ardabil province, Iran.

== Demographics ==
=== Population ===
At the time of the 2006 National Census, the village's population was 143 in 28 households. The following census in 2011 counted 96 people in 21 households. The 2016 census measured the population of the village as 49 people in 14 households.
