= Ebli =

Ebli or Ebelli or Abli (Persian: ابلي) may refer to:

- Ebli-ye Olya, Ardabil Province
- Ebli-ye Sofla, Ardabil Province
- Abli, East Azerbaijan

== See also ==
- Aebli, a surname
