= Yengejeh-ye Qeshlaq =

Village in Ardabil province, Iran

Yengejeh-ye Qeshlaq Persian: ینگجه قشلاق
- Village
- Location within Iran
- Coordinates: 37°37′31″N 48°11′48″E
- Country: Iran
- Province: Ardabil
- County: Kowsar
- District: Firuz
- Rural District: Sanjabad-e Jonubi

Population (2016)
  - Total: 126
- Time zone: UTC+3:30 (IRST)

Yengejeh-ye Qeshlaq (Persian: ینگجه قشلاق) (Note: Also romanized as Yengejeh-ye Qeshlāq) is a village in Sanjabad-e Jonubi Rural District of Firuz District in Kowsar County, Ardabil province, Iran.

== Demographics ==
=== Population ===
At the time of the 2006 National Census, the village's population was 138 in 23 households. The following census in 2011 counted 131 people in 33 households. The 2016 census measured the population of the village as 126 people in 31 households.
