= Boneh-ye Khalkhal =

Village in Ardabil province, Iran

Boneh-ye Khalkhal Persian: بنه خلخال
- Village
- Location within Iran
- Coordinates: 37°33′51″N 48°17′04″E
- Country: Iran
- Province: Ardabil
- County: Kowsar
- District: Firuz
- Rural District: Sanjabad-e Jonubi

Population (2016)
  - Total: 51
- Time zone: UTC+3:30 (IRST)

Boneh-ye Khalkhal (Persian: بنه خلخال) (Note: Also romanized as Boneh-ye Khalkhāl and Beneh Khalkhāl; also known as Bina-Khakhal, Bina Khalkhāl, and Boneh Khalkāl) is a village in Sanjabad-e Jonubi Rural District of Firuz District in Kowsar County, Ardabil province, Iran.

== Demographics ==
=== Population ===
At the time of the 2006 National Census, the village's population was 40 in eight households. The following census in 2011 counted 59 people in 18 households. The 2016 census measured the population of the village as 51 people in 13 households.
