= Bonyadabad =

Village in Ardabil province, Iran

Bonyadabad Persian: بنيادآباد
- Village
- Location within Iran
- Coordinates: 37°51′23″N 48°19′27″E
- Country: Iran
- Province: Ardabil
- County: Kowsar
- District: Central
- Rural District: Sanjabad-e Shomali

Population (2016)
  - Total: 406
- Time zone: UTC+3:30 (IRST)

Bonyadabad (Persian: بنياداباد) (Note: Also romanized as Bonyādābād; also known as Bonyādabād, Kalilanlu (‌كليلانو), and Mükeylān (مۆکیلان)) is a village in Sanjabad-e Shomali Rural District of the Central District in Kowsar County, Ardabil province, Iran.

== Demographics ==
=== Population ===
At the time of the 2006 National Census, the village's population was 522 in 95 households. The following census in 2011 counted 492 people in 99 households. The 2016 census measured the population of the village as 406 people in 111 households.
