= Dowgar, Ardabil =

Village in Ardabil province, Iran

Dowgar Persian: دوگر
- Village
- Location within Iran
- Coordinates: 37°30′45″N 48°15′58″E
- Country: Iran
- Province: Ardabil
- County: Kowsar
- District: Firuz
- Rural District: Sanjabad-e Jonubi

Population (2016)
  - Total: 87
- Time zone: UTC+3:30 (IRST)

Dowgar (Persian: دوگر) (Note: Also romanized as Dūgar and Dūger; also known as Dogar and Dyugar) is a village in Sanjabad-e Jonubi Rural District of Firuz District in Kowsar County, Ardabil province, Iran.

== Demographics ==
=== Population ===
At the time of the 2006 National Census, the village's population was 127 in 24 households. The following census in 2011 counted 122 people in 31 households. The 2016 census measured the population of the village as 87 people in 25 households.
