= Aliabad, Kowsar =

Village in Ardabil province, Iran

Aliabad Persian: علی‌آباد
- Village
- Location within Iran
- Coordinates: 37°43′41″N 48°21′21″E
- Country: Iran
- Province: Ardabil
- County: Kowsar
- District: Central
- Rural District: Sanjabad-e Gharbi

Population (2016)
  - Total: 111
- Time zone: UTC+3:30 (IRST)

Aliabad (Persian: علی‌آباد) (Note: Also romanized as `Alīābād; also known as Aleabad and Alvār) is a village in Sanjabad-e Gharbi Rural District of the Central District in Kowsar County, Ardabil province, Iran.

== Demographics ==
=== Population ===
At the time of the 2006 National Census, the village's population was 179 in 38 households. The following census in 2011 counted 123 people in 42 households. The 2016 census measured the population of the village as 111 people in 46 households.
