= Sharajabad =

Village in Ardabil province, Iran

Sharajabad Persian: شرج آباد
- Village
- Location within Iran
- Coordinates: 37°37′43″N 48°03′00″E
- Country: Iran
- Province: Ardabil
- County: Kowsar
- District: Firuz
- Rural District: Zarjabad

Population (2016)
  - Total: 30
- Time zone: UTC+3:30 (IRST)

Sharajabad (Persian: شرج آباد) (Note: Also romanized as Sharaj Abad, Sharajābād, Sharjābād, and Sherajābād; also known as Sharadzhua, Shāhrajua, Shāhrajūyeh, and Shīrajābād) is a village in Zarjabad Rural District of Firuz District in Kowsar County, Ardabil province, Iran.

== Demographics ==
=== Population ===
At the time of the 2006 National Census, the village's population was 48 in 13 households. The following census in 2011 counted 33 people in eight households. The 2016 census measured the population of the village as 30 people in 10 households.
