= Pir Aghaj, Ardabil =

Village in Ardabil province, Iran

Pir Aghaj Persian: پيرآغاج
- Village
- Location within Iran
- Coordinates: 37°49′07″N 48°15′52″E
- Country: Iran
- Province: Ardabil
- County: Kowsar
- District: Central
- Rural District: Sanjabad-e Gharbi

Population (2016)
  - Total: 118
- Time zone: UTC+3:30 (IRST)

Pir Aghaj (Persian: پيرآغاج) (Note: Also romanized as Pīr Āghāj; also known as Pir-Agach and Pīr Āghājī) is a village in Sanjabad-e Gharbi Rural District of the Central District in Kowsar County, Ardabil province, Iran.

== Demographics ==
=== Population ===
At the time of the 2006 National Census, the village's population was 174 in 33 households. The following census in 2011 counted 100 people in 28 households. The 2016 census measured the population of the village as 118 people in 35 households.
