= Mikailabad =

Village in Ardabil province, Iran

Mikailabad Persian: ميكاييل اباد
- Village
- Location within Iran
- Coordinates: 37°36′23″N 48°15′57″E
- Country: Iran
- Province: Ardabil
- County: Kowsar
- District: Firuz
- Rural District: Sanjabad-e Jonubi

Population (2016)
  - Total: 30
- Time zone: UTC+3:30 (IRST)

Mikailabad (Persian: ميكاييل اباد) (Note: Also romanized as Mīkā’īlābād; also known as Maghlehveh, Maglava, Mekā’īlābād, and Miglyava) is a village in Sanjabad-e Jonubi Rural District of Firuz District in Kowsar County, Ardabil province, Iran.

== Demographics ==
=== Population ===
At the time of the 2006 National Census, the village's population was 70 in 18 households. The following census in 2011 counted 50 people in 14 households. The 2016 census measured the population of the village as 30 people in nine households.
