= Arseh Dowgah =

Village in Ardabil province, Iran

Arseh Dowgah Persian: عرصه دوگاه
- Village
- Location within Iran
- Coordinates: 37°45′21″N 48°08′57″E
- Country: Iran
- Province: Ardabil
- County: Kowsar
- District: Central
- Rural District: Sanjabad-e Gharbi

Population (2016)
  - Total: 126
- Time zone: UTC+3:30 (IRST)

Arseh Dowgah (Persian: عرصه دوگاه) (Note: Also romanized as ‘Arşeh Dowgāh; also known as Arsadiga, Arsadya, Arseh Dījeh, and ‘Arşeh Dogāh) is a village in Sanjabad-e Gharbi Rural District of the Central District in Kowsar County, Ardabil province, Iran.

== Demographics ==
=== Population ===
At the time of the 2006 National Census, the village's population was 212 in 39 households. The following census in 2011 counted 151 people in 38 households. The 2016 census measured the population of the village as 126 people in 36 households.
