= Nowdeh, Kowsar =

Village in Ardabil province, Iran

Nowdeh Persian: نوده
- Village
- Location within Iran
- Coordinates: 37°48′06″N 48°21′06″E
- Country: Iran
- Province: Ardabil
- County: Kowsar
- District: Central
- Rural District: Sanjabad-e Shomali

Population (2016)
  - Total: 122
- Time zone: UTC+3:30 (IRST)

Nowdeh (Persian: نوده) (Note: Also romanized as Now Deh; also known as Nardeh, Nowdī, Nudi, and Nudy) is a village in Sanjabad-e Shomali Rural District of the Central District in Kowsar County, Ardabil province, Iran.

== Demographics ==
=== Population ===
At the time of the 2006 National Census, the village's population was 219 in 49 households. The following census in 2011 counted 222 people in 57 households. The 2016 census measured the population of the village as 122 people in 38 households.
