= Aq Bash =

Village in Ardabil province, Iran

Aq Bash Persian: اقباش
- Village
- Location within Iran
- Coordinates: 37°52′34″N 48°21′36″E
- Country: Iran
- Province: Ardabil
- County: Kowsar
- District: Central
- Rural District: Sanjabad-e Shomali

Population (2016)
  - Total: 78
- Time zone: UTC+3:30 (IRST)

Aq Bash (Persian: اقباش) (Note: Also romanized as Āq Bāsh and Āqbāsh; also known as Āgh Bāsh and Akbash) is a village in Sanjabad-e Shomali Rural District of the Central District in Kowsar County, Ardabil province, Iran.

== Demographics ==
=== Population ===
At the time of the 2006 National Census, the village's population was 105 in 27 households. The following census in 2011 counted 128 people in 38 households. The 2016 census measured the population of the village as 78 people in 22 households.
