= Heris, Ardabil =

Village in Ardabil province, Iran

Heris Persian: هريس
- Village
- Location within Iran
- Coordinates: 37°39′47″N 48°13′34″E
- Country: Iran
- Province: Ardabil
- County: Kowsar
- District: Central
- Rural District: Sanjabad-e Gharbi

Population (2016)
  - Total: 173
- Time zone: UTC+3:30 (IRST)

Heris (Persian: هريس) (Note: Also romanized as Herīs; also known as Hīrīz and Rīz) is a village in Sanjabad-e Gharbi Rural District of the Central District in Kowsar County, Ardabil province, Iran.

== Tourism ==
The village of Heris, located in the mountainous region of Kowsar County in Ardabil Province.

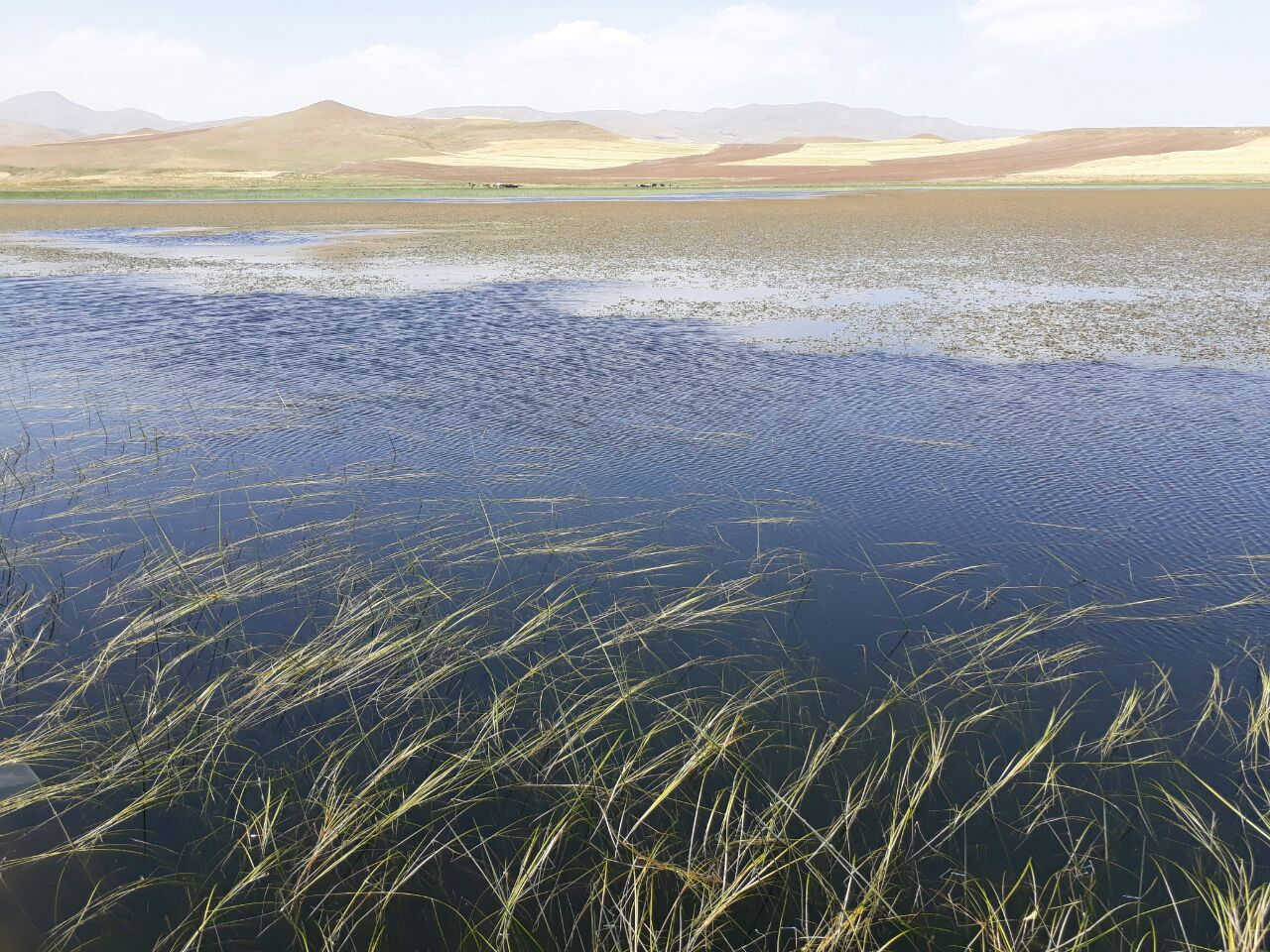

== Demographics ==
=== Population ===
At the time of the 2006 National Census, the village's population was 177 in 68 households. The following census in 2011 counted 239 people in 59 households. The 2016 census measured the population of the village as 173 people in 57 households.
