= Qarah Qeshlaq, Kowsar =

Village in Ardabil province, Iran

Qarah Qeshlaq Persian: قره قشلاق
- Village
- Location within Iran
- Coordinates: 37°46′04″N 48°18′27″E
- Country: Iran
- Province: Ardabil
- County: Kowsar
- District: Central
- Rural District: Sanjabad-e Gharbi

Population (2016)
  - Total: 315
- Time zone: UTC+3:30 (IRST)

Qarah Qeshlaq (Persian: قره قشلاق) (Note: Also romanized as Qarah Qeshlāq and Qareh Qeshlāq; also known as Kara-Kishlak and Qara Qishlāq) is a village in Sanjabad-e Gharbi Rural District of the Central District in Kowsar County, Ardabil province, Iran.

== Demographics ==
=== Population ===
At the time of the 2006 National Census, the village's population was 338 in 73 households. The following census in 2011 counted 321 people in 89 households. The 2016 census measured the population of the village as 315 people in 101 households.
