= Khalfelu =

Village in Ardabil province, Iran

Khalfelu Persian: خلفلو
- Village
- Location within Iran
- Coordinates: 37°53′11″N 48°23′34″E
- Country: Iran
- Province: Ardabil
- County: Kowsar
- District: Central
- Rural District: Sanjabad-e Shomali

Population (2016)
  - Total: 42
- Time zone: UTC+3:30 (IRST)

Khalfelu (Persian: خلفلو) (Note: Also romanized as Khalaflū and Khalfalū; also known as Khalaf-Ali and Khalfehlu, romanized as Khalfehlū) is a village in, and the capital of, Sanjabad-e Shomali Rural District in the Central District of Kowsar County, Ardabil province, Iran.

== Demographics ==
=== Population ===
At the time of the 2006 National Census, the village's population was 111 in 26 households. The following census in 2011 counted 83 people in 25 households. The 2016 census measured the population of the village as 42 people in 13 households.
