= Chalgarud =

Village in Ardabil province, Iran

Chalgarud Persian: چالگرود
- Village
- Location within Iran
- Coordinates: 37°40′32″N 48°23′50″E
- Country: Iran
- Province: Ardabil
- County: Kowsar
- District: Central
- Rural District: Sanjabad-e Gharbi

Population (2016)
  - Total: 546
- Time zone: UTC+3:30 (IRST)

Chalgarud (Persian: چالگرود) (Note: Also romanized as Chālgarūd; also known as Chālgar) is a village in Sanjabad-e Gharbi Rural District of the Central District in Kowsar County, Ardabil province, Iran.

== Demographics ==
=== Population ===
At the time of the 2006 National Census, the village's population was 531 in 110 households. The following census in 2011 counted 567 people in 140 households. The 2016 census measured the population of the village as 546 people in 172 households.
