= Qalin Qayah =

Village in Ardabil province, Iran

Qalin Qayah Persian: قالين قيه
- Village
- Location within Iran
- Coordinates: 37°40′05″N 48°06′48″E
- Country: Iran
- Province: Ardabil
- County: Kowsar
- District: Firuz
- Rural District: Zarjabad

Population (2016)
  - Total: 99
- Time zone: UTC+3:30 (IRST)

Qalin Qayah (Persian: قالين قيه) (Note: Also romanized as Qālīn Qayah and Qālīn Qayeh; also known as Hārūn Qal‘eh and Kalangaya) is a village in Zarjabad Rural District of Firuz District in Kowsar County, Ardabil province, Iran.

== Demographics ==
=== Population ===
At the time of the 2006 National Census, the village's population was 139 in 30 households. The following census in 2011 counted 121 people in 29 households. The 2016 census measured the population of the village as 99 people in 28 households.
