= Qarakh Bolagh, Kowsar =

Village in Ardabil province, Iran

Qarakh Bolagh Persian: قرخ بلاغ
- Village
- Location within Iran
- Coordinates: 37°53′48″N 48°20′56″E
- Country: Iran
- Province: Ardabil
- County: Kowsar
- District: Central
- Rural District: Sanjabad-e Shomali

Population (2016)
  - Total: 35
- Time zone: UTC+3:30 (IRST)

Qarakh Bolagh (Persian: قرخ بلاغ) (Note: Also romanized as Qarakh Bolāgh and Qerkh Bolāgh; also known as Farrokh Bolāgh) is a village in Sanjabad-e Shomali Rural District of the Central District in Kowsar County, Ardabil province, Iran.

== Demographics ==
=== Population ===
At the time of the 2006 National Census, the village's population was 66 in 14 households. The following census in 2011 counted 56 people in 13 households. The 2016 census measured the population of the village as 35 people in 13 households.
