= Ilkhchi, Kowsar =

Village in Ardabil province, Iran

Ilkhchi Persian: ايلخچي
- Village
- Location within Iran
- Coordinates: 37°38′09″N 48°14′43″E
- Country: Iran
- Province: Ardabil
- County: Kowsar
- District: Firuz
- Rural District: Sanjabad-e Jonubi

Population (2016)
  - Total: 126
- Time zone: UTC+3:30 (IRST)

Ilkhchi (Persian: ايلخچي) (Note: Also romanized as Īlkhchī; also known as Alqazī and El’khechi) is a village in Sanjabad-e Jonubi Rural District of Firuz District in Kowsar County, Ardabil province, Iran.

== Demographics ==
=== Population ===
At the time of the 2006 National Census, the village's population was 169 in 38 households. The following census in 2011 counted 197 people in 53 households. The 2016 census measured the population of the village as 126 people in 34 households.
