= Ab-e Garm-e Givy =

Village in Ardabil province, Iran

Ab-e Garm-e Givy Persian: ابگرم گيوئ
- Village
- Location within Iran
- Coordinates: 37°41′0″N 48°25′51″E
- Country: Iran
- Province: Ardabil
- County: Kowsar
- District: Central
- Rural District: Sanjabad-e Gharbi

Population (2016)
  - Total: 32
- Time zone: UTC+3:30 (IRST)

Ab-e Garm-e Givy (Persian: ابگرم گيوئ) (Note: Also romanized as Āb-e Garm-e Gīvy; also known as Āb-e Garm) is a village in Sanjabad-e Gharbi Rural District of the Central District in Kowsar County, Ardabil province, Iran.

== Demographics ==
=== Population ===
At the time of the 2006 National Census, the village's population was 47 in 13 households. The following census in 2011 counted 45 people in 17 households. The 2016 census measured the population of the village as 32 people in 12 households.
