= Navand =

Village in Ardabil province, Iran

Navand Persian: ناوند
- Village
- Location within Iran
- Coordinates: 37°37′03″N 48°02′25″E
- Country: Iran
- Province: Ardabil
- County: Kowsar
- District: Firuz
- Rural District: Zarjabad

Population (2016)
  - Total: 32
- Time zone: UTC+3:30 (IRST)

Navand (Persian: ناوند) (Note: Also romanized as Nāvand) is a village in Zarjabad Rural District of Firuz District in Kowsar County, Ardabil province, Iran.

== Demographics ==
=== Population ===
At the time of the 2006 National Census, the village's population was 109 in 24 households. The following census in 2011 counted 64 people in 18 households. The 2016 census measured the population of the village as 32 people in 13 households.
