= Komoq =

Village in Ardabil province, Iran

Komoq Persian: كمق
- Village
- Location within Iran
- Coordinates: 37°38′51″N 48°10′08″E
- Country: Iran
- Province: Ardabil
- County: Kowsar
- District: Firuz
- Rural District: Sanjabad-e Jonubi

Population (2016)
  - Total: 85
- Time zone: UTC+3:30 (IRST)

Komoq (Persian: كمق) (Note: Also romanized as Kamaq; also known as Kūmak) is a village in Sanjabad-e Jonubi Rural District of Firuz District in Kowsar County, Ardabil province, Iran.

== Demographics ==
=== Population ===
At the time of the 2006 National Census, the village's population was 166 in 34 households. The following census in 2011 counted 134 people in 34 households. The 2016 census measured the population of the village as 85 people in 27 households.
