= Gilanduz =

Village in Ardabil province, Iran

Gilanduz Persian: گیلان‌دوز
- Village
- Location within Iran
- Coordinates: 37°39′31″N 48°05′59″E
- Country: Iran
- Province: Ardabil
- County: Kowsar
- District: Firuz
- Rural District: Zarjabad

Population (2016)
  - Total: 153
- Time zone: UTC+3:30 (IRST)

Gilanduz (Persian: گیلان‌دوز) (Note: Also romanized as Gīlāndūz; also known as Gelandūz and Kilandus) is a village in Zarjabad Rural District of Firuz District in Kowsar County, Ardabil province, Iran.

== Demographics ==
=== Population ===
At the time of the 2006 National Census, the village's population was 168 in 30 households. The following census in 2011 counted 164 people in 40 households. The 2016 census measured the population of the village as 153 people in 43 households.
