= Pargu =

Village in Ardabil province, Iran

Pargu Persian: پرگو
- Village
- Location within Iran
- Coordinates: 37°45′08″N 48°12′20″E
- Country: Iran
- Province: Ardabil
- County: Kowsar
- District: Central
- Rural District: Sanjabad-e Gharbi

Population (2016)
  - Total: 33
- Time zone: UTC+3:30 (IRST)

Pargu (Persian: پرگو) (Note: Also romanized as Pargū and Porgū) is a village in Sanjabad-e Gharbi Rural District of the Central District in Kowsar County, Ardabil province, Iran.

== Demographics ==
=== Population ===
At the time of the 2006 National Census, the village's population was 70 in 16 households. The following census in 2011 counted 71 people in 22 households. The 2016 census measured the population of the village as 33 people in 11 households.
