= Aqa Mirlu =

Aqa Mirlu (Persian: اقاميرلو) may refer to:

- Aqa Mirlu, Ardabil
- Aqamirlu, Kaleybar, East Azerbaijan Province
- Aqa Mirlu, Khoda Afarin, East Azerbaijan Province
