= Farab, Ardabil =

Village in Ardabil province, Iran

Farab Persian: فاراب
- Village
- Location within Iran
- Coordinates: 37°43′36″N 48°18′14″E
- Country: Iran
- Province: Ardabil
- County: Kowsar
- District: Central
- Rural District: Sanjabad-e Gharbi

Population (2016)
  - Total: 650
- Time zone: UTC+3:30 (IRST)

Farab (Persian: فاراب) (Note: Also romanized as Fārāb) is a village in Sanjabad-e Gharbi Rural District of the Central District in Kowsar County, Ardabil province, Iran.

== Demographics ==
=== Population ===
At the time of the 2006 National Census, the village's population was 650 in 138 households. The following census in 2011 counted 664 people in 191 households. The 2016 census measured the population of the village as 650 people in 197 households.
