= Sharafa =

Sharafa may refer to:

- Şərəfə, Azerbaijan
- Sharafa, Ardabil, Iran
- Sharafa, East Azerbaijan, Iran
