= Pardastlu =

Village in Ardabil province, Iran

Pardastlu Persian: پردستلو
- Village
- Location within Iran
- Coordinates: 37°41′58″N 48°09′58″E
- Country: Iran
- Province: Ardabil
- County: Kowsar
- District: Central
- Rural District: Sanjabad-e Gharbi

Population (2016)
  - Total: 68
- Time zone: UTC+3:30 (IRST)

Pardastlu (Persian: پردستلو) (Note: Also romanized as Pardastlū; also known as Bardastlū and Pardastī) is a village in Sanjabad-e Gharbi Rural District of the Central District in Kowsar County, Ardabil province, Iran.

== Demographics ==
=== Population ===
At the time of the 2006 National Census, the village's population was 146 in 32 households. The following census in 2011 counted 101 people in 28 households. The 2016 census measured the population of the village as 68 people in 21 households.
