= Lakandasht =

Village in Ardabil province, Iran

Lakandasht Persian: لكندشت
- Village
- Location within Iran
- Coordinates: 37°47′21″N 48°14′01″E
- Country: Iran
- Province: Ardabil
- County: Kowsar
- District: Central
- Rural District: Sanjabad-e Gharbi

Population (2016)
  - Total: 75
- Time zone: UTC+3:30 (IRST)

Lakandasht (Persian: لكندشت) (Note: Also known as Langadasht (لگندشت) and Lyachandash) is a village in Sanjabad-e Gharbi Rural District of the Central District in Kowsar County, Ardabil province, Iran.

== Demographics ==
=== Population ===
At the time of the 2006 National Census, the village's population was 216 in 48 households. The following census in 2011 counted 80 people in 27 households. The 2016 census measured the population of the village as 75 people in 24 households.
