= Rostamabad, Ardabil =

Village in Ardabil province, Iran

Rostamabad Persian: رستم اباد
- Village
- Location within Iran
- Coordinates: 37°36′29″N 48°07′48″E
- Country: Iran
- Province: Ardabil
- County: Kowsar
- District: Firuz
- Rural District: Zarjabad

Population (2016)
  - Total: 20
- Time zone: UTC+3:30 (IRST)

Rostamabad (Persian: رستم اباد) (Note: Also romanized as Rostamābād) is a village in Zarjabad Rural District of Firuz District in Kowsar County, Ardabil province, Iran.

== Demographics ==
=== Population ===
At the time of the 2006 National Census, the village's population was 27 in six households. The following census in 2011 counted 58 people in 21 households. The 2016 census measured the population of the village as 20 people in seven households.
