= Tabrizaq =

Village in Ardabil province, Iran

Tabrizaq Persian: تبريزق
- Village
- Location within Iran
- Coordinates: 37°43′52″N 48°10′03″E
- Country: Iran
- Province: Ardabil
- County: Kowsar
- District: Central
- Rural District: Sanjabad-e Gharbi

Population (2016)
  - Total: 33
- Time zone: UTC+3:30 (IRST)

Tabrizaq (Persian: تبريزق) (Note: Also romanized as Tabrīzaq; also known as Tabrīzak, Tarbezaq, Tarbizek, Tardīzak, and Tareh Tīzak) is a village in Sanjabad-e Gharbi Rural District of the Central District in Kowsar County, Ardabil province, Iran.

== Demographics ==
=== Population ===
At the time of the 2006 National Census, the village's population was 96 in 22 households. The following census in 2011 counted 66 people in 19 households. The 2016 census measured the population of the village as 33 people in 12 households.
