= Amirabad, Kowsar =

Village in Ardabil province, Iran

Amirabad Persian: اميراباد
- Village
- Location within Iran
- Coordinates: 37°32′09″N 48°08′07″E
- Country: Iran
- Province: Ardabil
- County: Kowsar
- District: Firuz
- Rural District: Sanjabad-e Jonubi

Population (2016)
  - Total: 60
- Time zone: UTC+3:30 (IRST)

Amirabad (Persian: اميراباد) (Note: Also romanized as Amīrābād) is a village in Sanjabad-e Jonubi Rural District of Firuz District in Kowsar County, Ardabil province, Iran.

== Demographics ==
=== Population ===
At the time of the 2006 National Census, the village's population was 90 in 23 households. The following census in 2011 counted 66 people in 14 households. The 2016 census measured the population of the village as 60 people in 15 households.
