= Nasirabad, Kowsar =

Village in Ardabil province, Iran

Nasirabad Persian: نصيراباد
- Village
- Location within Iran
- Coordinates: 37°43′50″N 48°12′30″E
- Country: Iran
- Province: Ardabil
- County: Kowsar
- District: Central
- Rural District: Sanjabad-e Gharbi

Population (2016)
  - Total: 81
- Time zone: UTC+3:30 (IRST)

Nasirabad (Persian: نصيراباد) (Note: Also romanized as Naşīrābād; also known as Kūylar, Nasrava, and Nasrawa) is a village in Sanjabad-e Gharbi Rural District of the Central District in Kowsar County, Ardabil province, Iran.

== Demographics ==
=== Population ===
At the time of the 2006 National Census, the village's population was 98 in 28 households. The following census in 2011 counted 122 people in 40 households. The 2016 census measured the population of the village as 81 people in 23 households.
