= Pirehney =

Village in Ardabil province, Iran

Pirehney Persian: پیره‌نی
- Village
- Location within Iran
- Coordinates: 37°46′56″N 48°15′18″E
- Country: Iran
- Province: Ardabil
- County: Kowsar
- District: Central
- Rural District: Sanjabad-e Gharbi

Population (2016)
  - Total: 14
- Time zone: UTC+3:30 (IRST)

Pirehney (Persian: پیره‌نی) (Note: Also known as Pireh Afeqi (‌پره افقي)) is a village in Sanjabad-e Gharbi Rural District of the Central District in Kowsar County, Ardabil province, Iran.

== Demographics ==
=== Population ===
At the time of the 2006 National Census, the village's population was below the reporting threshold. The following census in 2011 counted 54 people in 17 households. The 2016 census measured the population of the village as 14 people in five households.
