= Pir Bodagh =

Village in Ardabil province, Iran

Pir Bodagh Persian: پيربداغ
- Village
- Location within Iran
- Coordinates: 37°42′15″N 48°08′08″E
- Country: Iran
- Province: Ardabil
- County: Kowsar
- District: Central
- Rural District: Sanjabad-e Gharbi

Population (2016)
  - Total: 181
- Time zone: UTC+3:30 (IRST)

Pir Bodagh (Persian: پيربداغ) (Note: Also romanized as Pīr Bodāgh; also known as Pīr Bodāq and Pīr Bolāgh) is a village in Sanjabad-e Gharbi Rural District of the Central District in Kowsar County, Ardabil province, Iran.

== Demographics ==
=== Population ===
At the time of the 2006 National Census, the village's population was 316 in 57 households. The following census in 2011 counted 259 people in 48 households. The 2016 census measured the population of the village as 181 people in 46 households.
