= Alankash =

Village in Ardabil province, Iran

Alankash Persian: النكش
- Village
- Location within Iran
- Coordinates: 37°49′48″N 48°25′27″E
- Country: Iran
- Province: Ardabil
- County: Kowsar
- District: Central
- Rural District: Sanjabad-e Shomali

Population (2016)
  - Total: 204
- Time zone: UTC+3:30 (IRST)

Alankash (Persian: النكش) (Note: Also romanized as Ālankash and Alankesh; also known as Alangesh) is a village in Sanjabad-e Shomali Rural District of the Central District in Kowsar County, Ardabil province, Iran.

== Demographics ==
=== Population ===
At the time of the 2006 National Census, the village's population was 194 in 33 households. The following census in 2011 counted 208 people in 52 households. The 2016 census measured the population of the village as 204 people in 46 households.
