= Goli Jan, Ardabil =

Village in Ardabil province, Iran

Goli Jan Persian: گلی‌جان
- Village
- Location within Iran
- Coordinates: 37°32′08″N 48°17′09″E
- Country: Iran
- Province: Ardabil
- County: Kowsar
- District: Firuz
- Rural District: Sanjabad-e Jonubi

Population (2016)
  - Total: 351
- Time zone: UTC+3:30 (IRST)

Goli Jan (Persian: گلی‌جان) (Note: Also romanized as Golī Jān and Golījān; also known as Golūjān, Gūlalījān, Gulujan, and Gyulyudzhan) is a village in Sanjabad-e Jonubi Rural District of Firuz District in Kowsar County, Ardabil province, Iran.

== Demographics ==
=== Population ===
At the time of the 2006 National Census, the village's population was 435 in 89 households. The following census in 2011 counted 420 people in 111 households. The 2016 census measured the population of the village as 351 people in 111 households.
