= Joghanab, Ardabil =

Village in Ardabil province, Iran

Joghanab Persian: جغناب
- Village
- Location within Iran
- Coordinates: 37°46′21″N 48°21′10″E
- Country: Iran
- Province: Ardabil
- County: Kowsar
- District: Central
- Rural District: Sanjabad-e Gharbi

Population (2016)
  - Total: 469
- Time zone: UTC+3:30 (IRST)

Joghanab (Persian: جغناب) (Note: Also romanized as Jaghnāb, Jeghanāb, and Joghanāb; also known as Chaginap and Cheqanāb) is a village in Sanjabad-e Gharbi Rural District of the Central District in Kowsar County, Ardabil province, Iran.

== Demographics ==
=== Population ===
At the time of the 2006 National Census, the village's population was 471 in 90 households. The following census in 2011 counted 418 people in 124 households. The 2016 census measured the population of the village as 469 people in 143 households.
