= Baghcheh Chiq =

Village in Ardabil province, Iran

Baghcheh Chiq Persian: باغچه چيق
- Village
- Location within Iran
- Coordinates: 37°43′29″N 48°07′35″E
- Country: Iran
- Province: Ardabil
- County: Kowsar
- District: Central
- Rural District: Sanjabad-e Gharbi

Population (2016)
  - Total: 30
- Time zone: UTC+3:30 (IRST)

Baghcheh Chiq (Persian: باغچه چيق) (Note: Also romanized as Bāghcheh Chīq; also known as Bāghcheh Jīq) is a village in Sanjabad-e Gharbi Rural District of the Central District in Kowsar County, Ardabil province, Iran.

== Demographics ==
=== Population ===
At the time of the 2006 National Census, the village's population was 57 in eight households. The following census in 2011 counted 78 people in 22 households. The 2016 census measured the population of the village as 30 people in eight households.
