= Galin Qeshlaqi =

Village in Ardabil province, Iran

Galin Qeshlaqi Persian: گلين قشلاقي
- Village
- Location within Iran
- Coordinates: 37°55′31″N 48°24′28″E
- Country: Iran
- Province: Ardabil
- County: Kowsar
- District: Central
- Rural District: Sanjabad-e Shomali

Population (2016)
  - Total: 89
- Time zone: UTC+3:30 (IRST)

Galin Qeshlaqi (Persian: گلين قشلاقي) (Note: Also romanized as Galīn Qeshlāqī; also known as Galīn Qeshlāq and Kelenshtally) is a village in Sanjabad-e Shomali Rural District of the Central District in Kowsar County, Ardabil province, Iran.

== Demographics ==
=== Population ===
At the time of the 2006 National Census, the village's population was 133 in 24 households. The following census in 2011 counted 129 people in 33 households. The 2016 census measured the population of the village as 89 people in 22 households.
