= Quzlu, Kowsar =

Village in Ardabil province, Iran

Quzlu Persian: قوزلو
- Village
- Location within Iran
- Coordinates: 37°38′31″N 48°06′10″E
- Country: Iran
- Province: Ardabil
- County: Kowsar
- District: Firuz
- Rural District: Zarjabad

Population (2016)
  - Total: 364
- Time zone: UTC+3:30 (IRST)

Quzlu (Persian: قوزلو) (Note: Also romanized as Qowzlū and Qūzlū; also known as Kozli and Kozly) is a village in Zarjabad Rural District of Firuz District in Kowsar County, Ardabil province, Iran.

== Demographics ==
=== Population ===
At the time of the 2006 National Census, the village's population was 458 in 111 households. The following census in 2011 counted 463 people in 126 households. The 2016 census measured the population of the village as 364 people in 119 households.
