= Shahsavarlu =

Village in Ardabil province, Iran

Shahsavarlu Persian: شهسوارلو
- Village
- Location within Iran
- Coordinates: 37°46′49″N 48°08′54″E
- Country: Iran
- Province: Ardabil
- County: Kowsar
- District: Central
- Rural District: Sanjabad-e Gharbi

Population (2016)
  - Total: 39
- Time zone: UTC+3:30 (IRST)

Shahsavarlu (Persian: شهسوارلو) (Note: Also romanized as Shahsavārlū, Shāhsavārlū; also known as Eslāmābād (اسلام اباد), Shāsīvarī, Shasiwarri, and Shasuar) is a village in Sanjabad-e Gharbi Rural District of the Central District in Kowsar County, Ardabil province, Iran.

== Demographics ==
=== Population ===
At the time of the 2006 National Census, the village's population was 47 in nine households. The following census in 2011 counted 33 people in nine households. The 2016 census measured the population of the village as 39 people in nine households.
