= Tushmanlu, Ardabil =

Village in Ardabil province, Iran

Tushmanlu Persian: توشمانلو
- Village
- Location within Iran
- Coordinates: 37°45′26″N 48°11′18″E
- Country: Iran
- Province: Ardabil
- County: Kowsar
- District: Central
- Rural District: Sanjabad-e Gharbi

Population (2016)
  - Total: 79
- Time zone: UTC+3:30 (IRST)

Tushmanlu (Persian: توشمانلو) (Note: Also romanized as Tūshmānlū; also known as Doshman, Doshmanlī, Doshmānlū, Dūshmallī, and Toshmanlū) is a village in Sanjabad-e Gharbi Rural District of the Central District in Kowsar County, Ardabil province, Iran.

== Demographics ==
=== Population ===
At the time of the 2006 National Census, the village's population was 153 in 34 households. The following census in 2011 counted 106 people in 30 households. The 2016 census measured the population of the village as 79 people in 26 households.
