= Jafarlu =

Village in Ardabil province, Iran

Jafarlu Persian: جعفرلو
- Village
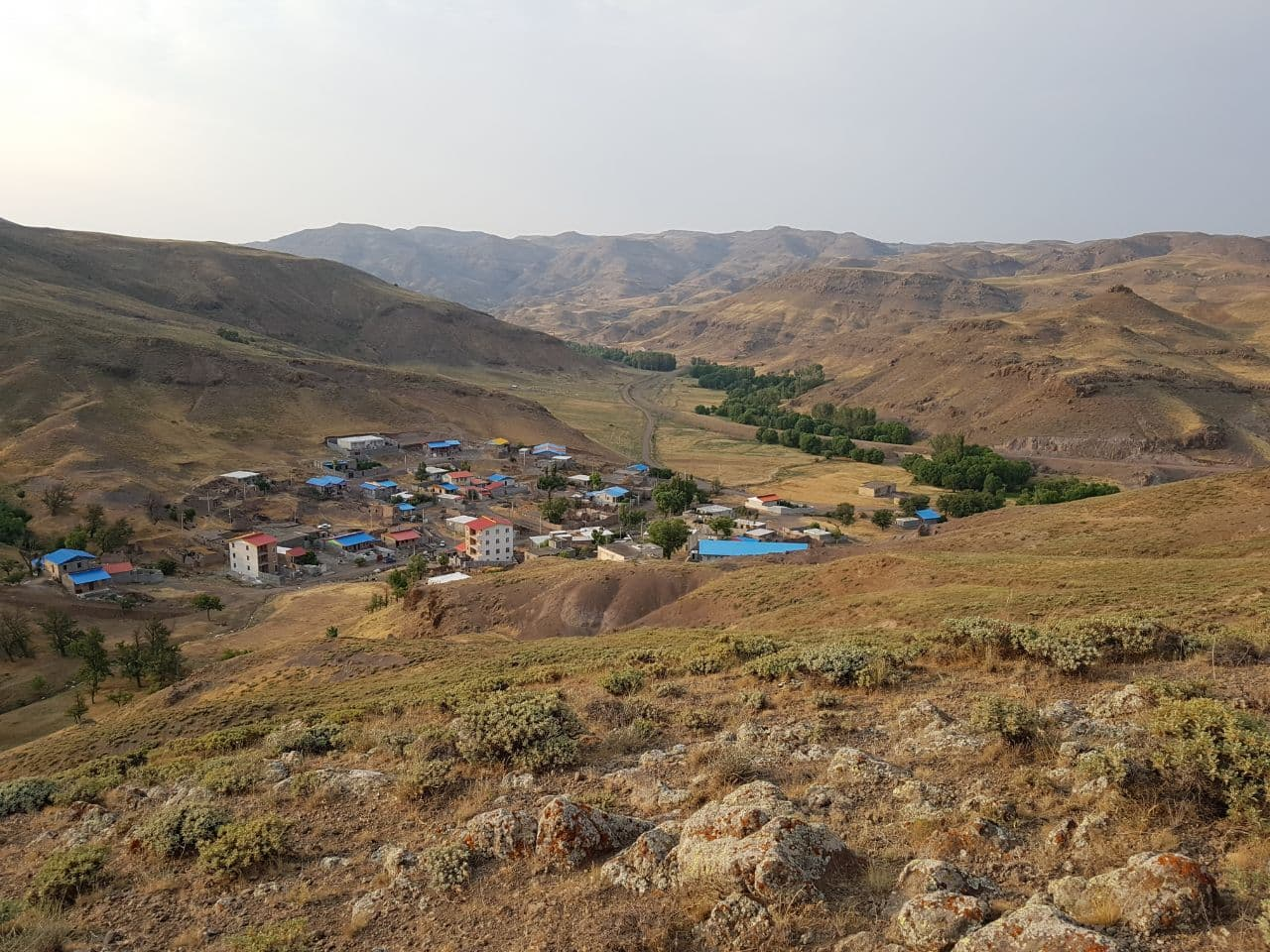
- The village of Jafarlu in summer

- Location within Iran
- Coordinates: 37°54′57″N 48°21′19″E
- Country: Iran
- Province: Ardabil
- County: Kowsar
- District: Central
- Rural District: Sanjabad-e Shomali

Population (2016)
  - Total: 56
- Time zone: UTC+3:30 (IRST)

Jafarlu (Persian: جعفرلو) (Note: Also romanized as Ja‘farlū) is a village in Sanjabad-e Shomali Rural District of the Central District in Kowsar County, Ardabil province, Iran.

== Demographics ==
=== Population ===
At the time of the 2006 National Census, the village's population was 106 in 23 households. The following census in 2011 counted 66 people in 14 households. The 2016 census measured the population of the village as 56 people in 20 households.
