= Sureh Barq =

Village in Ardabil province, Iran

Sureh Barq Persian: سوره برق
- Village
- Location within Iran
- Coordinates: 37°41′27″N 48°17′55″E
- Country: Iran
- Province: Ardabil
- County: Kowsar
- District: Central
- Rural District: Sanjabad-e Gharbi

Population (2016)
  - Total: 122
- Time zone: UTC+3:30 (IRST)

Sureh Barq (Persian: سوره برق) (Note: Also romanized as Sūreh Barq; also known as Sorābar, Surabara, and Sūrbāq) is a village in Sanjabad-e Gharbi Rural District of the Central District in Kowsar County, Ardabil province, Iran.

== Demographics ==
=== Population ===
At the time of the 2006 National Census, the village's population was 134 in 34 households. The following census in 2011 counted 122 people in 36 households. The 2016 census measured the population of the village as 122 people in 35 households.
