= Dowlatabad, Kowsar =

Village in Ardabil province, Iran

Dowlatabad Persian: دولت اباد
- Village
- Location within Iran
- Coordinates: 37°36′45″N 48°02′12″E
- Country: Iran
- Province: Ardabil
- County: Kowsar
- District: Firuz
- Rural District: Zarjabad

Population (2016)
  - Total: 41
- Time zone: UTC+3:30 (IRST)

Dowlatabad (Persian: دولت اباد) (Note: Also romanized as Dowlatābād; also known as Dulyatabad) is a village in Zarjabad Rural District of Firuz District in Kowsar County, Ardabil province, Iran.

== Demographics ==
=== Population ===
At the time of the 2006 National Census, the village's population was 117 in 28 households. The following census in 2011 counted 71 people in 19 households. The 2016 census measured the population of the village as 41 people in 18 households.
