= Zarjabad =

Village in Ardabil province, Iran

Zarjabad Persian: زرج اباد
- Village
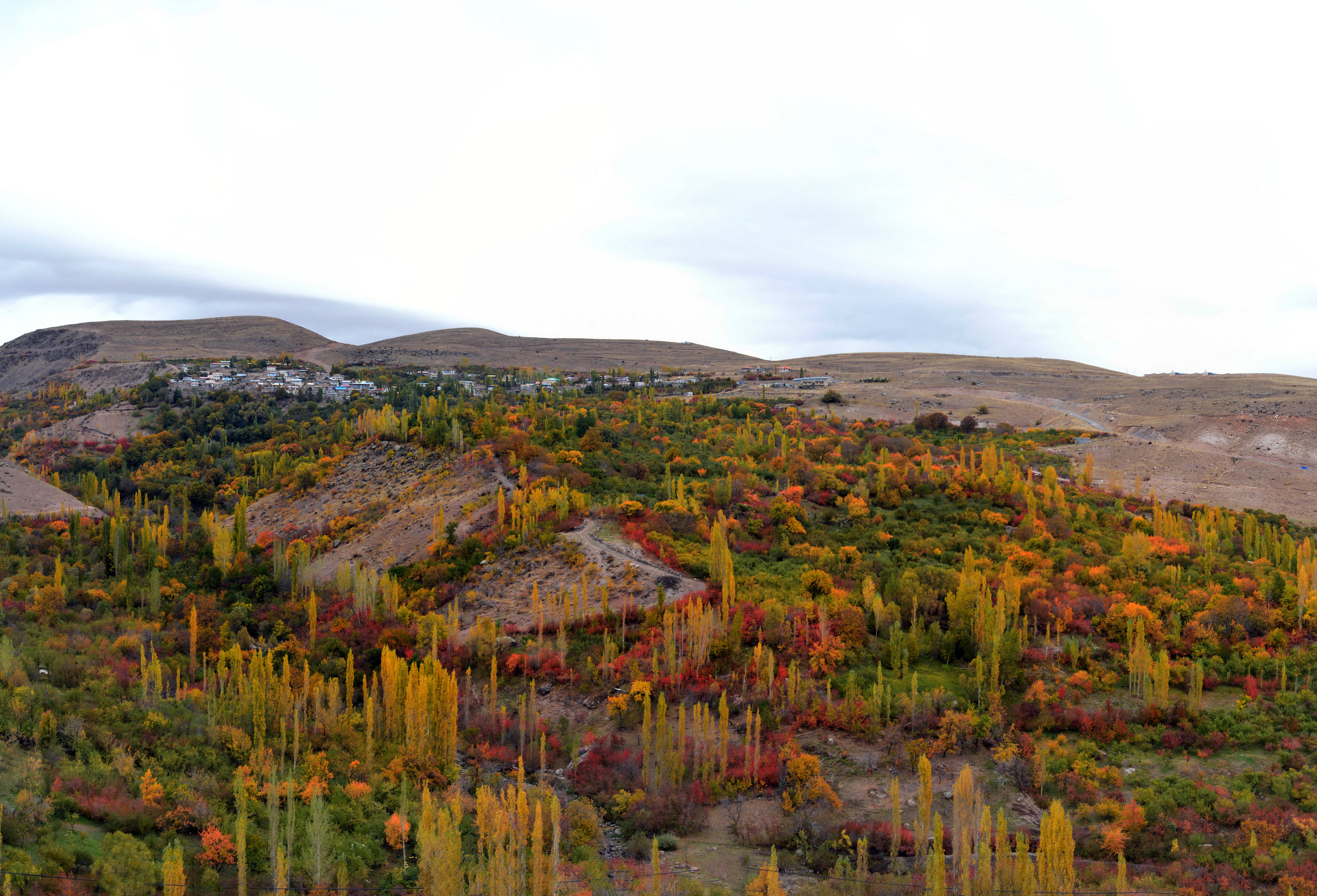
- Zarjabad

- Location within Iran
- Coordinates: 37°38′57″N 48°03′33″E
- Country: Iran
- Province: Ardabil
- County: Kowsar
- District: Firuz
- Rural District: Zarjabad

Population (2016)
  - Total: 778
- Time zone: UTC+3:30 (IRST)

Zarjabad (Persian: زرج اباد) (Note: Also romanized as Zarjābād and Zarajābād; also known as Zaianjua, Zarandzhua, and Zeyānjūyeh) is a village in, and the capital of, Zarjabad Rural District in Firuz District of Kowsar County, Ardabil province, Iran.

== Demographics ==
=== Population ===
At the time of the 2006 National Census, the village's population was 1,127 in 252 households. The following census in 2011 counted 936 people in 261 households. The 2016 census measured the population of the village as 778 people in 231 households. It was the most populous village in its rural district.
