= Afshar-e Olya =

Village in Ardabil province, Iran

Afshar-e Olya Persian: افشارعليا
- Village
- Location within Iran
- Coordinates: 37°31′06″N 48°08′31″E
- Country: Iran
- Province: Ardabil
- County: Kowsar
- District: Firuz
- Rural District: Sanjabad-e Jonubi

Population (2016)
  - Total: 32
- Time zone: UTC+3:30 (IRST)

Afshar-e Olya (Persian: افشارعليا) (Note: Also romanized as Afshār-e ‘Olyā; also known as Afshār, Afshār Tātakī, Afshār-e Bālā, Kagarān, Kegran, and Tābakī Afshār) is a village in Sanjabad-e Jonubi Rural District of Firuz District in Kowsar County, Ardabil province, Iran.

== Demographics ==
=== Population ===
At the time of the 2006 National Census, the village's population was 28 in eight households. The following census in 2011 counted 50 people in 12 households. The 2016 census measured the population of the village as 32 people in nine households.
