= Vechin =

Village in Ardabil province, Iran

Vechin Persian: وچين
- Village
- Location within Iran
- Coordinates: 37°52′01″N 48°26′51″E
- Country: Iran
- Province: Ardabil
- County: Kowsar
- District: Central
- Rural District: Sanjabad-e Shomali

Population (2016)
  - Total: 71
- Time zone: UTC+3:30 (IRST)

Vechin (Persian: وچين) (Note: Also romanized as Vechīn; also known as Viachin and Vyachin) is a village in Sanjabad-e Shomali Rural District of the Central District in Kowsar County, Ardabil province, Iran.

== Demographics ==
=== Population ===
At the time of the 2006 National Census, the village's population was 101 in 26 households. The following census in 2011 counted 90 people in 26 households. The 2016 census measured the population of the village as 71 people in 20 households.
