= Heshin =

Village in Ardabil province, Iran

Heshin Persian: هشين
- Village
- Location within Iran
- Coordinates: 37°34′33″N 48°06′00″E
- Country: Iran
- Province: Ardabil
- County: Kowsar
- District: Firuz
- Rural District: Sanjabad-e Jonubi

Population (2016)
  - Total: 422
- Time zone: UTC+3:30 (IRST)

Heshin (Persian: هشين) (Note: Also romanized as Heshīn; also known as Gishavan) is a village in Sanjabad-e Jonubi Rural District of Firuz District in Kowsar County, Ardabil province, Iran.

== Demographics ==
=== Population ===
At the time of the 2006 National Census, the village's population was 583 in 137 households. The following census in 2011 counted 538 people in 143 households. The 2016 census measured the population of the village as 422 people in 124 households.
