= Saqqavaz =

Village in Ardabil province, Iran

Saqqavaz Persian: سقاواز
- Village
- Location within Iran
- Coordinates: 37°55′46″N 48°27′40″E
- Country: Iran
- Province: Ardabil
- County: Kowsar
- District: Central
- Rural District: Sanjabad-e Shomali

Population (2016)
  - Total: 318
- Time zone: UTC+3:30 (IRST)

Saqqavaz (Persian: سقاواز) (Note: Also romanized as Saqqāvāz; also known as Sa‘d Vaqqāş and Sakavas) is a village in Sanjabad-e Shomali Rural District of the Central District in Kowsar County, Ardabil province, Iran.

== Demographics ==
=== Population ===
At the time of the 2006 National Census, the village's population was 462 in 73 households. The following census in 2011 counted 343 people in 69 households. The 2016 census measured the population of the village as 318 people in 83 households.
