= Aebli =

Aebli is a surname. Notable people with the surname include:

- Christian Aebli (born 1978), Swiss bobsledder
- Hans Aebli (1921–1990), Swiss educationist, theorist, and researcher

== See also ==
- Aepli
- Ebli (disambiguation)
