= Karandaq =

Village in Ardabil province, Iran

Karandaq Persian: كرندق
- Village
- Location within Iran
- Coordinates: 37°47′13″N 48°22′19″E
- Country: Iran
- Province: Ardabil
- County: Kowsar
- District: Central
- Rural District: Sanjabad-e Shomali

Population (2016)
  - Total: 502
- Time zone: UTC+3:30 (IRST)

Karandaq (Persian: كرندق) (Note: Also known as Karanda, Karandāgh, Karandaraq, and Qaranda) is a village in Sanjabad-e Shomali Rural District of the Central District in Kowsar County, Ardabil province, Iran.

== Demographics ==
=== Population ===
At the time of the 2006 National Census, the village's population was 801 in 167 households. The following census in 2011 counted 816 people in 217 households. The 2016 census measured the population of the village as 502 people in 146 households. It was the most populous village in its rural district.
