= Ney Ahmad Beyg =

Village in Ardabil province, Iran

Ney Ahmad Beyg Persian: ني احمدبيگ
- Village
- Location within Iran
- Coordinates: 37°42′24″N 48°25′18″E
- Country: Iran
- Province: Ardabil
- County: Kowsar
- District: Central
- Rural District: Sanjabad-e Gharbi

Population (2016)
  - Total: 124
- Time zone: UTC+3:30 (IRST)

Ney Ahmad Beyg (Persian: ني احمدبيگ) (Note: Also romanized as Ney Aḩmad Beyg; also known as Bī Aḩmad Beyg, Nei, and Ney) is a village in Sanjabad-e Gharbi Rural District of the Central District in Kowsar County, Ardabil province, Iran.

== Demographics ==
=== Population ===
At the time of the 2006 National Census, the village's population was 283 in 55 households. The following census in 2011 counted 195 people in 48 households. The 2016 census measured the population of the village as 124 people in 31 households.
