= Tarkeh Deh =

Village in Ardabil province, Iran

Tarkeh Deh Persian: تركه ده
- Village
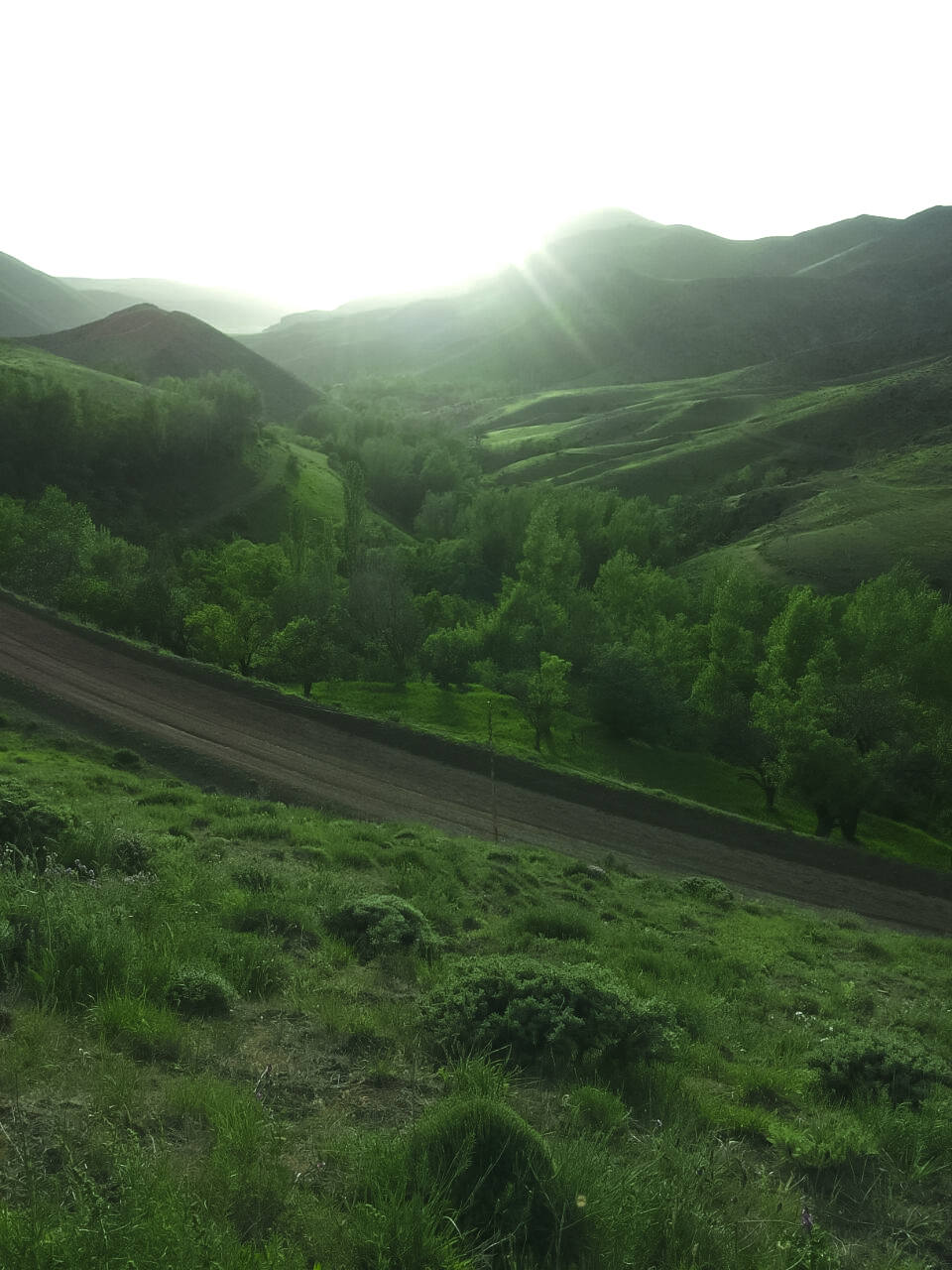
- The gardens of Tarkeh Deh village

- Location within Iran
- Coordinates: 37°56′44″N 48°21′47″E
- Country: Iran
- Province: Ardabil
- County: Kowsar
- District: Central
- Rural District: Sanjabad-e Shomali

Population (2016)
  - Total: 16
- Time zone: UTC+3:30 (IRST)

Tarkeh Deh (Persian: تركه ده) (Note: Also known as Torkadeh) is a village in Sanjabad-e Shomali Rural District of the Central District in Kowsar County, Ardabil province, Iran.

== Demographics ==
=== Population ===
At the time of the 2006 National Census, the village's population was 56 in 13 households. The following census in 2011 counted 28 people in seven households. The 2016 census measured the population of the village as 16 people in seven households.

== Gallery ==
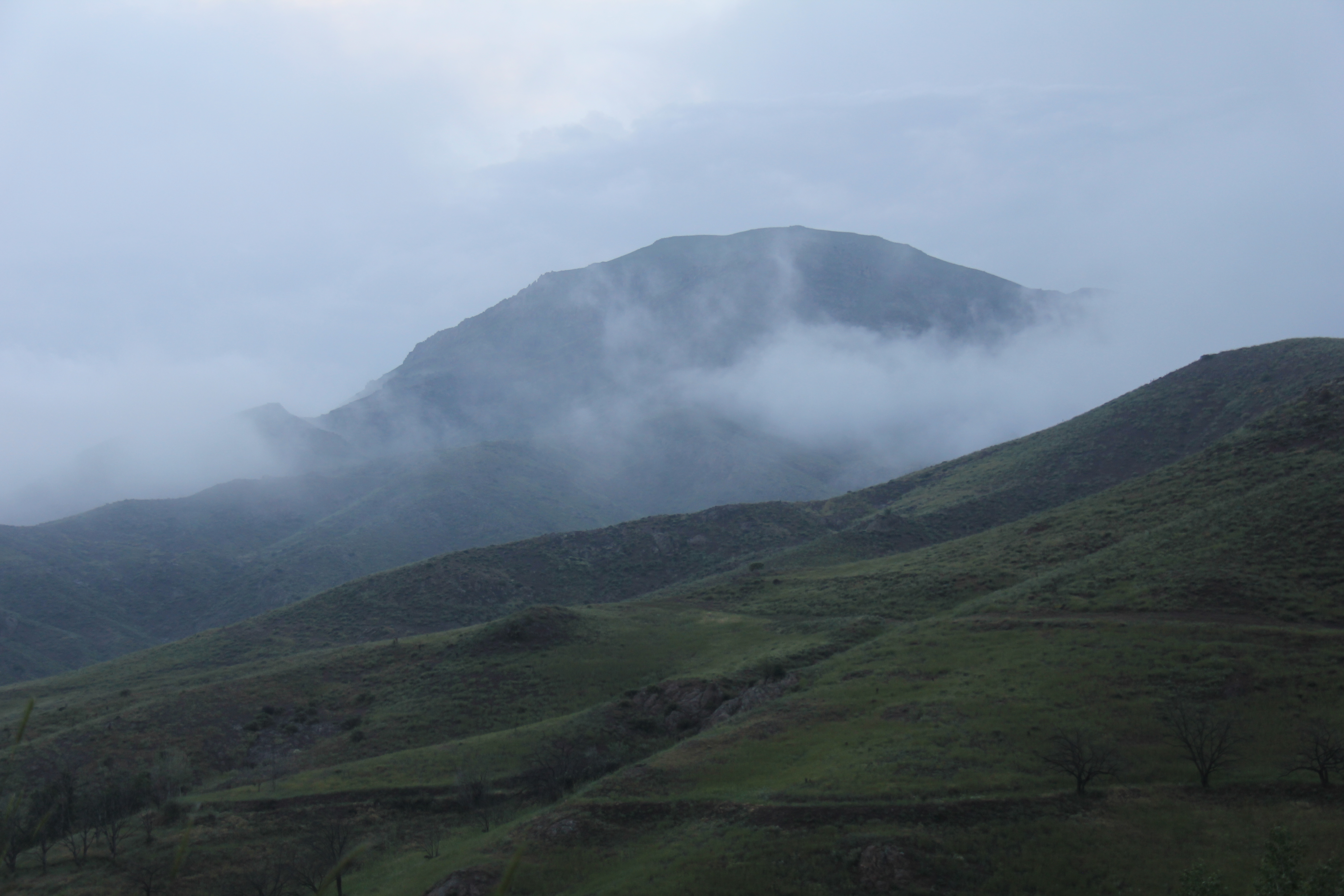
Foggy scene in Tarkeh Deh

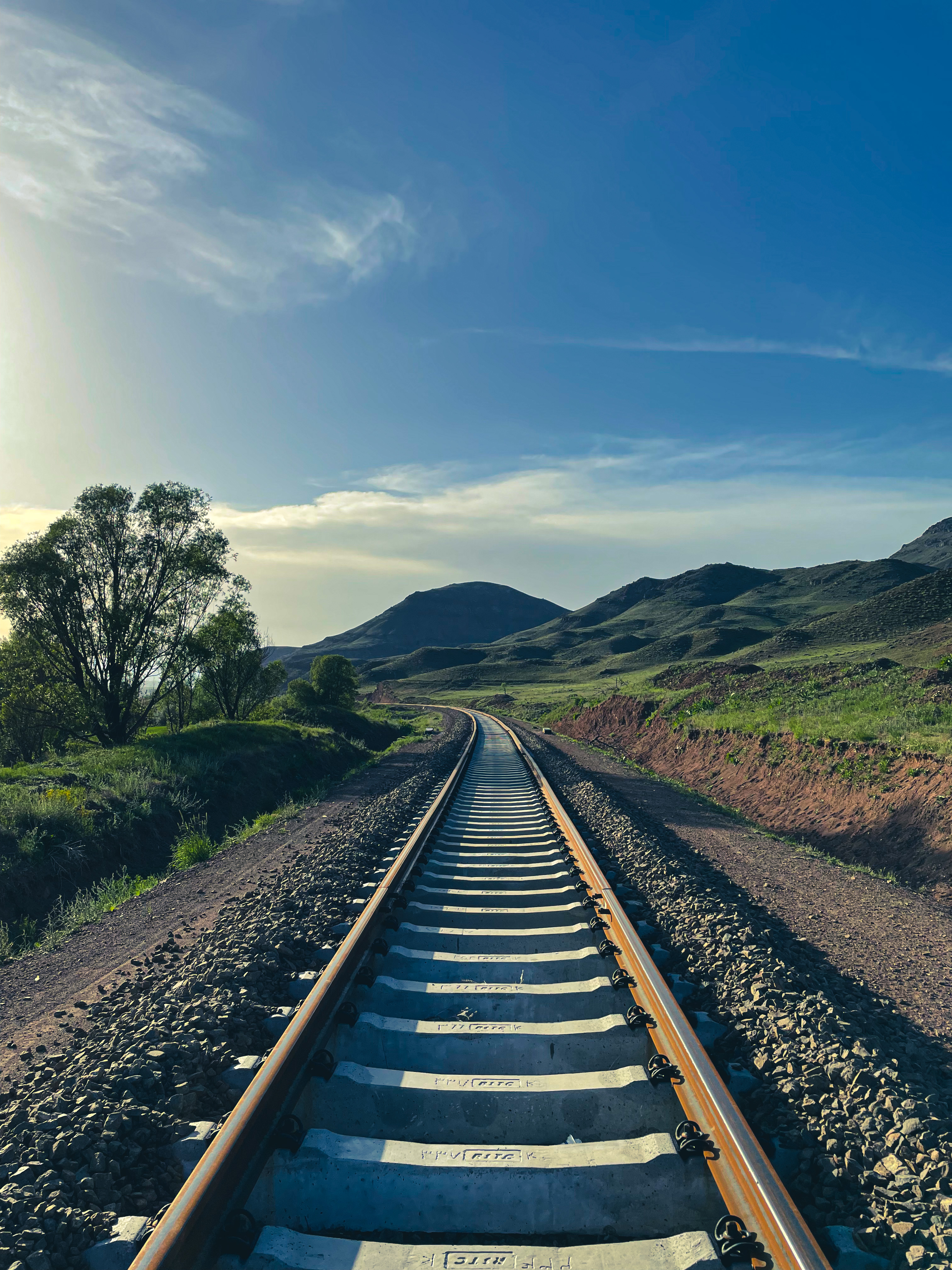
Mianeh–Ardabil railway line next to Tarkeh Deh

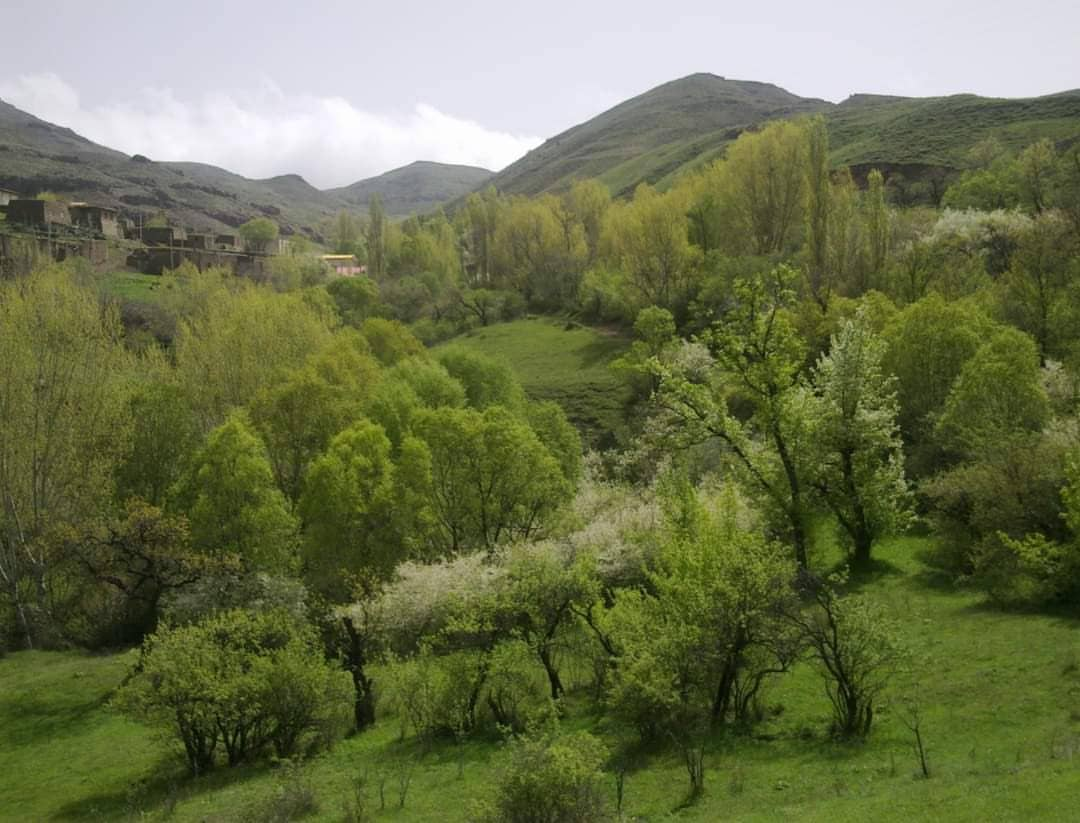
Ashaghi Garden in Tarkeh Deh
