= Sekarabad =

Village in Ardabil province, Iran

Sekarabad Persian: سكراباد
- Village
- Location within Iran
- Coordinates: 37°36′47″N 48°16′31″E
- Country: Iran
- Province: Ardabil
- County: Kowsar
- District: Firuz
- Rural District: Sanjabad-e Jonubi

Population (2016)
  - Total: 85
- Time zone: UTC+3:30 (IRST)

Sekarabad (Persian: سكراباد) (Note: Also romanized as Sekarābād and Sokrābād; also known as Sagliawa, Seglyava, and Soklāveh) is a village in Sanjabad-e Jonubi Rural District of Firuz District in Kowsar County, Ardabil province, Iran.

== Demographics ==
=== Population ===
At the time of the 2006 National Census, the village's population was 144 in 26 households. The following census in 2011 counted 138 people in 31 households. The 2016 census measured the population of the village as 85 people in 25 households.
