= Zenab =

Village in Ardabil province, Iran

Zenab Persian: زناب
- Village
- Location within Iran
- Coordinates: 37°35′05″N 48°09′59″E
- Country: Iran
- Province: Ardabil
- County: Kowsar
- District: Firuz
- Rural District: Sanjabad-e Jonubi

Population (2016)
  - Total: 86
- Time zone: UTC+3:30 (IRST)

Zenab (Persian: زناب) (Note: Also romanized as Zenāb; also known as Zenyāb, Zinab, and Zīnat) is a village in Sanjabad-e Jonubi Rural District of Firuz District in Kowsar County, Ardabil province, Iran.

== Demographics ==
=== Population ===
At the time of the 2006 National Census, the village's population was 108 in 18 households. The following census in 2011 counted 102 people in 24 households. The 2016 census measured the population of the village as 86 people in 26 households.
