= Suflu =

Village in Ardabil province, Iran

Suflu Persian: صوفلو
- Village
- Location within Iran
- Coordinates: 37°39′15″N 48°08′35″E
- Country: Iran
- Province: Ardabil
- County: Kowsar
- District: Firuz
- Rural District: Zarjabad

Population (2016)
  - Total: 142
- Time zone: UTC+3:30 (IRST)

Suflu (Persian: صوفلو) (Note: Also romanized as Şūflū; also known as Sofoly) is a village in Zarjabad Rural District of Firuz District in Kowsar County, Ardabil province, Iran.

== Demographics ==
=== Population ===
At the time of the 2006 National Census, the village's population was 259 in 58 households. The following census in 2011 counted 250 people in 72 households. The 2016 census measured the population of the village as 142 people in 48 households.
