= Nilaq =

Village in Ardabil province, Iran

Nilaq Persian: نيلق
- Village
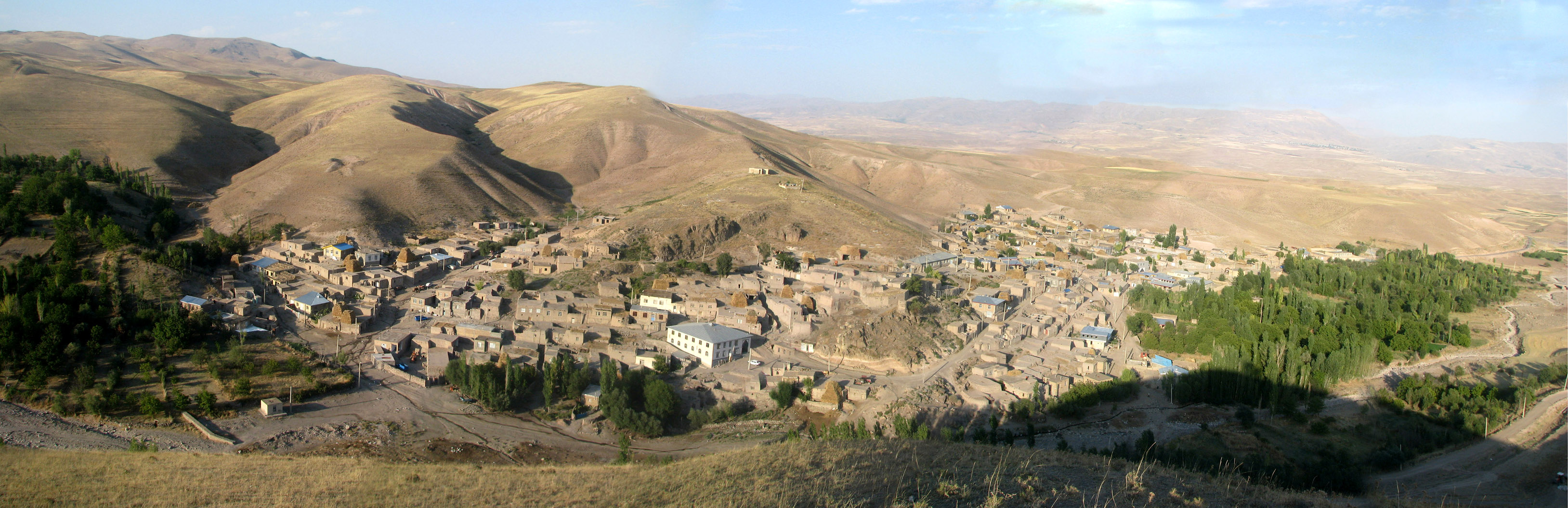
- The village of Nilaq

- Location within Iran
- Coordinates: 37°42′08″N 48°12′07″E
- Country: Iran
- Province: Ardabil
- County: Kowsar
- District: Central
- Rural District: Sanjabad-e Gharbi

Population (2016)
  - Total: 464
- Time zone: UTC+3:30 (IRST)

Nilaq (Persian: نيلق) (Note: Also romanized as Neylaq and Nīlaq; also known as Lailia, Leyleyeh, and Ley-lya) is a village in Sanjabad-e Gharbi Rural District of the Central District in Kowsar County, Ardabil province, Iran.

== Demographics ==
=== Population ===
At the time of the 2006 National Census, the village's population was 709 in 143 households. The following census in 2011 counted 610 people in 147 households. The 2016 census measured the population of the village as 464 people in 134 households.
