= Gol Tappeh, Kowsar =

Village in Ardabil province, Iran

Gol Tappeh Persian: گل تپه
- Village
- Location within Iran
- Coordinates: 37°41′26″N 48°25′46″E
- Country: Iran
- Province: Ardabil
- County: Kowsar
- District: Central
- Rural District: Sanjabad-e Gharbi

Population (2016)
  - Total: 11
- Time zone: UTC+3:30 (IRST)

Gol Tappeh (Persian: گل تپه) (Note: Also known as Kal Tappeh) is a village in Sanjabad-e Gharbi Rural District of the Central District in Kowsar County, Ardabil province, Iran.

== Demographics ==
=== Population ===
At the time of the 2006 National Census, the village's population was 31 in nine households. The following census in 2011 counted 26 people in 11 households. The 2016 census measured the population of the village as 11 people in five households.
