= Owch Bolagh, Kowsar =

Village in Ardabil province, Iran

Owch Bolagh Persian: اوچبلاغ
- Village
- Location within Iran
- Coordinates: 37°42′36″N 48°06′52″E
- Country: Iran
- Province: Ardabil
- County: Kowsar
- District: Central
- Rural District: Sanjabad-e Gharbi

Population (2016)
  - Total: 16
- Time zone: UTC+3:30 (IRST)

Owch Bolagh (Persian: اوچبلاغ) (Note: Also romanized as Owch Bolāgh and Ūch Bolāgh) is a village in Sanjabad-e Gharbi Rural District of the Central District in Kowsar County, Ardabil province, Iran.

== Demographics ==
=== Population ===
At the time of the 2006 National Census, the village's population was 39 in six households. The following census in 2011 counted 24 people in five households. The 2016 census measured the population of the village as 16 people in four households.
