= Sulugoli Gol =

Village in Ardabil province, Iran

Sulugoli Gol Persian: سولوگلي گل
- Village
- Location within Iran
- Coordinates: 37°38′56″N 48°06′33″E
- Country: Iran
- Province: Ardabil
- County: Kowsar
- District: Firuz
- Rural District: Zarjabad

Population (2016)
  - Total: 89
- Time zone: UTC+3:30 (IRST)

Sulugoli Gol (Persian: سولوگلي گل) (Note: Also romanized as Sūlūgolī Gol; also known as Soluglu-Tel, Solūklū, Solūklū Gol, Solyuglyu-Tel’, and Sūkalū Gol) is a village in Zarjabad Rural District of Firuz District in Kowsar County, Ardabil province, Iran.

== Demographics ==
=== Population ===
At the time of the 2006 National Census, the village's population was 132 in 28 households. The following census in 2011 counted 110 people in 29 households. The 2016 census measured the population of the village as 89 people in 31 households.
