= Qaleh Juq, Kowsar =

Village in Ardabil province, Iran

Qaleh Juq Persian: قلعه جوق
- Village
- Location within Iran
- Coordinates: 37°54′53″N 48°30′21″E
- Country: Iran
- Province: Ardabil
- County: Kowsar
- District: Central
- Rural District: Sanjabad-e Shomali

Population (2016)
  - Total: 34
- Time zone: UTC+3:30 (IRST)

Qaleh Juq (Persian: قلعه جوق) (Note: Also romanized as Qal‘eh Jūq; also known as Qal‘eh Joq) is a village in Sanjabad-e Shomali Rural District of the Central District in Kowsar County, Ardabil province, Iran.

== Demographics ==
=== Population ===
At the time of the 2006 National Census, the village's population was 91 in 15 households. The following census in 2011 counted 124 people in 31 households. The 2016 census measured the population of the village as 34 people in seven households.
