= Arpa Chai, Ardabil =

Village in Ardabil province, Iran

Arpa Chai Persian: ارپاچايي
- Village
- Location within Iran
- Coordinates: 37°51′52″N 48°32′28″E
- Country: Iran
- Province: Ardabil
- County: Kowsar
- District: Central
- Rural District: Sanjabad-e Shomali

Population (2016)
  - Total: 156
- Time zone: UTC+3:30 (IRST)

Arpa Chai (Persian: ارپاچايي) (Note: Also romanized as Ārpā Chā’ī and Ārpā Chāy) is a village in Sanjabad-e Shomali Rural District of the Central District in Kowsar County, Ardabil province, Iran.

== Demographics ==
=== Population ===
At the time of the 2006 National Census, the village's population was 221 in 34 households. The following census in 2011 counted 228 people in 51 households. The 2016 census measured the population of the village as 156 people in 31 households.
