= Majdar =

Village in Ardabil province, Iran

Majdar Persian: مجدر
- Village
- Location within Iran
- Coordinates: 37°54′00″N 48°26′36″E
- Country: Iran
- Province: Ardabil
- County: Kowsar
- District: Central
- Rural District: Sanjabad-e Shomali

Population (2016)
  - Total: 170
- Time zone: UTC+3:30 (IRST)

Majdar (Persian: مجدر) (Note: Also romanized as Mejdar; also known as Marjānābād, Mezhdar, Mīzehdar, Mizhdar, and Mojaddad) is a village in Sanjabad-e Shomali Rural District of the Central District in Kowsar County, Ardabil province, Iran.

== Demographics ==
=== Population ===
At the time of the 2006 National Census, the village's population was 332 in 60 households. The following census in 2011 counted 300 people in 78 households. The 2016 census measured the population of the village as 170 people in 51 households.
