= Ebli-ye Olya =

Village in Ardabil province, Iran

Ebli-ye Olya Persian: ابلي عليا
- Village
- Location within Iran
- Coordinates: 37°45′10″N 48°14′12″E
- Country: Iran
- Province: Ardabil
- County: Kowsar
- District: Central
- Rural District: Sanjabad-e Gharbi

Population (2016)
  - Total: 34
- Time zone: UTC+3:30 (IRST)

Ebli-ye Olya (Persian: ابلي عليا) (Note: Also romanized as Ebellī ‘Olyā and Eblī-ye ‘Olyā; also known as Ablī-ye Bālā, Ibli Ulia, and Ibli-Ulya) is a village in Sanjabad-e Gharbi Rural District of the Central District in Kowsar County, Ardabil province, Iran.

== Demographics ==
=== Population ===
At the time of the 2006 National Census, the village's population was 58 in 18 households. The following census in 2011 counted 85 people in 32 households. The 2016 census measured the population of the village as 34 people in 14 households.
