= Aghcheh Qeshlaq-e Sofla =

Village in Ardabil province, Iran

Aghcheh Qeshlaq-e Sofla Persian: آغچه قشلاق سفلی
- Village
- Location within Iran
- Coordinates: 37°50′59″N 48°20′13″E
- Country: Iran
- Province: Ardabil
- County: Kowsar
- District: Central
- Rural District: Sanjabad-e Shomali

Population (2016)
  - Total: 49
- Time zone: UTC+3:30 (IRST)

Aghcheh Qeshlaq-e Sofla (Persian: آغچه قشلاق سفلی) (Note: Also romanized as Āghcheh Qeshlāq-e Soflá; also known as Āghcheh Qeshlāq-e Pā’īn, Āqcheh Qeshlāq-e Soflá, Hūrānī, and Maranlu (‌مرانلو)) is a village in Sanjabad-e Shomali Rural District of the Central District in Kowsar County, Ardabil province, Iran.

== Demographics ==
=== Population ===
At the time of the 2006 National Census, the village's population was 68 in 12 households. The following census in 2011 counted 57 people in 16 households. The 2016 census measured the population of the village as 49 people in 14 households.
