= Shevir =

Shevir or Shavir or Shuyer (Persian: شوير or شويرع) may refer to:

- Shavir, Ardabil (شوير - Shavīr)
- Shevir, Zanjan (شوير - Shevīr)
- Ari Shavit, Israeli reporter and writer
