= Havashanq =

Village in Ardabil province, Iran

Havashanq Persian: هواشانق
- Village
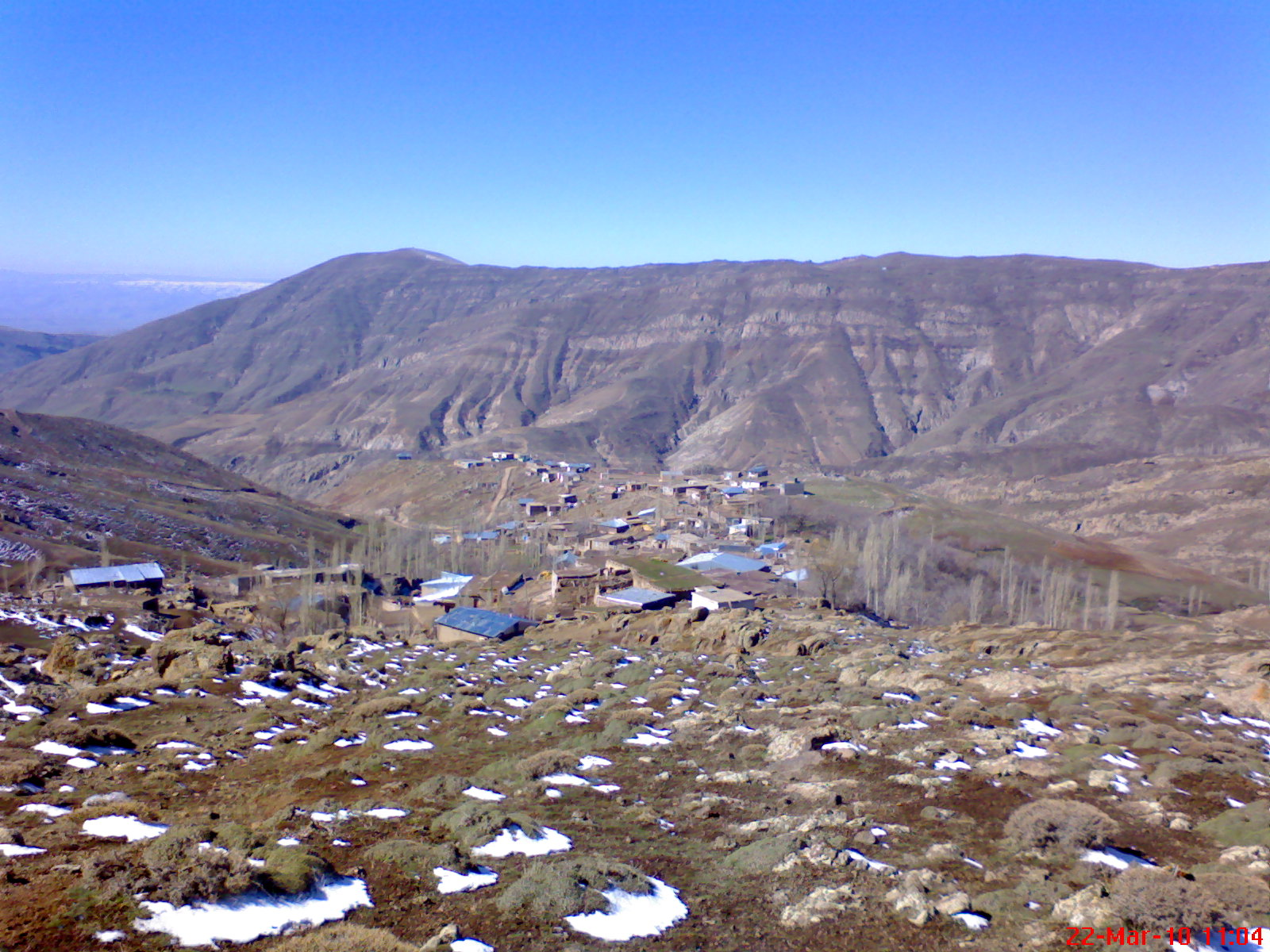
- The village of Havashanq

- Location within Iran
- Coordinates: 37°43′28″N 48°24′49″E
- Country: Iran
- Province: Ardabil
- County: Kowsar
- District: Central
- Rural District: Sanjabad-e Gharbi

Population (2016)
  - Total: 547
- Time zone: UTC+3:30 (IRST)

Havashanq (Persian: هواشانق) (Note: Also romanized as Havāshānq; also known as Abashan and Āvāshānaq) is a village in Sanjabad-e Gharbi Rural District of the Central District in Kowsar County, Ardabil province, Iran.

== Demographics ==
=== Population ===
At the time of the 2006 National Census, the village's population was 596 in 121 households. The following census in 2011 counted 589 people in 167 households. The 2016 census measured the population of the village as 547 people in 166 households.
