= Sharafabad, Ardabil =

Village in Ardabil province, Iran

Sharafabad Persian: شرف اباد
- Village
- Location within Iran
- Coordinates: 37°34′13″N 48°10′19″E
- Country: Iran
- Province: Ardabil
- County: Kowsar
- District: Firuz
- Rural District: Sanjabad-e Jonubi

Population (2016)
  - Total: Below reporting threshold
- Time zone: UTC+3:30 (IRST)

Sharafabad (Persian: شرف اباد) (Note: Also romanized as Sharafābād; also known as Sharafa) is a village in Sanjabad-e Jonubi Rural District of Firuz District in Kowsar County, Ardabil province, Iran.

== Demographics ==
=== Population ===
At the time of the 2006 National Census, the village's population was 40 in nine households. The following census in 2011 counted 38 people in nine households. The 2016 census measured the population of the village as below the reporting threshold.
