= Jalil Jafari =

Jalil Jafari Banehkhalkhal
- جلیل جعفری بنه‌خلخال

member of Islamic Consultative Assembly
- In office 2012–2016
- Constituency: Khalkhal and Kowsar (electoral district)

Personal details
- Born: 1967 (age 58–59) Kivi, Iran
- Education: PHD from Amirkabir University of Technology

Jalil Jafari (Persian: ‌جلیل جعفری; born 1967) is an Iranian politician.

Jafari was born in Kowsar, Ardabil Province. He is a member of the 9th Islamic Consultative Assembly from the electorate of Kowsar and Khalkhal. Jafari won with 23,745 (40.64%) votes.
