= Lekvan =

Lekvan or Lakvan (Persian: لكوان) may refer to:

- Lakvan, Germi
- Lekvan, Kowsar
