= Ebli-ye Sofla =

Village in Ardabil province, Iran

Ebli-ye Sofla Persian: ابلي سفلي
- Village
- Location within Iran
- Coordinates: 37°44′41″N 48°14′10″E
- Country: Iran
- Province: Ardabil
- County: Kowsar
- District: Central
- Rural District: Sanjabad-e Gharbi

Population (2016)
  - Total: 88
- Time zone: UTC+3:30 (IRST)

Ebli-ye Sofla (Persian: ابلي سفلي) (Note: Also romanized as Ebellī Soflá and Eblī-ye Soflá; also known as Ablī-ye Pā’īn, Ebellī, and Eblī-ye Pa'īn) is a village in Sanjabad-e Gharbi Rural District of the Central District in Kowsar County, Ardabil province, Iran.

== Demographics ==
=== Population ===
At the time of the 2006 National Census, the village's population was 132 in 27 households. The following census in 2011 counted 127 people in 30 households. The 2016 census measured the population of the village as 88 people in 24 households.
