= Miresh =

Miresh may refer to:

- Miresh, a village in the Bulqizë Municipality of eastern Albania
- Meresht, a village in the Sanjabad-e Shomali Rural District of northern Iran
