= Marjanabad =

Marjanabad (Persian: مرجان اباد) may refer to:

- Marjanabad, Ardabil
- Marjanabad, Tehran
- Marjanabad, West Azerbaijan
