= Gazvar-e Sofla =

Village in Ardabil province, Iran

Gazvar-e Sofla Persian: گزورسفلي
- Village
- Location within Iran
- Coordinates: 37°48′51″N 48°19′55″E
- Country: Iran
- Province: Ardabil
- County: Kowsar
- District: Central
- Rural District: Sanjabad-e Shomali

Population (2016)
  - Total: 71
- Time zone: UTC+3:30 (IRST)

Gazvar-e Sofla (Persian: گزورسفلي) (Note: Also romanized as Gazūr-e Soflá and Gazvar-e Soflá; also known as Gazvar, Kazvar, Kazvaz-e Soflá, Kazwar, and Kyazvar) is a village in Sanjabad-e Shomali Rural District of the Central District in Kowsar County, Ardabil province, Iran.

== Demographics ==
=== Population ===
At the time of the 2006 National Census, the village's population was 80 in 14 households. The following census in 2011 counted 66 people in 14 households. The 2016 census measured the population of the village as 71 people in 20 households.
