= Ommabad =

Ommabad or Amabad (Persian: ام اباد) may refer to:

- Ommabad, Ardabil
- Ommabad, Zanjan
