= Shavir, Ardabil =

Village in Ardabil province, Iran

Shavir Persian: شوير
- Village
- Location within Iran
- Coordinates: 37°45′22″N 48°21′17″E
- Country: Iran
- Province: Ardabil
- County: Kowsar
- District: Central
- Rural District: Sanjabad-e Gharbi

Population (2016)
  - Total: 150
- Time zone: UTC+3:30 (IRST)

Shavir (Persian: شوير) (Note: Also romanized as Shavīr, Shevīr, and Shūyer; also known as Shuyur) is a village in Sanjabad-e Gharbi Rural District of the Central District in Kowsar County, Ardabil province, Iran.

== Demographics ==
=== Population ===
At the time of the 2006 National Census, the village's population was 140 in 22 households. The following census in 2011 counted 133 people in 39 households. The 2016 census measured the population of the village as 150 people in 50 households.
