= Gorgabad, Ardabil =

Village in Ardabil province, Iran

Gorgabad Persian: گرگ اباد
- Village
- Location within Iran
- Coordinates: 37°38′32″N 48°18′29″E
- Country: Iran
- Province: Ardabil
- County: Kowsar
- District: Firuz
- Rural District: Sanjabad-e Jonubi

Population (2016)
  - Total: 41
- Time zone: UTC+3:30 (IRST)

Gorgabad (Persian: گرگ اباد) (Note: Also romanized as Gorgābād; also known as Sa‘īdābād) is a village in Sanjabad-e Jonubi Rural District of Firuz District in Kowsar County, Ardabil province, Iran.

== Demographics ==
=== Population ===
At the time of the 2006 National Census, the village's population was 82 in 14 households. The following census in 2011 counted 76 people in 20 households. The 2016 census measured the population of the village as 41 people in 14 households.
