= Gol Qeshlaq =

Gol Qeshlaq or Golqeshlaq (Persian: گل قشلاق) may refer to:

- Gol Qeshlaq, Ardabil
- Gol Qeshlaq, Kurdistan
