= Natur =

Natur may refer to:

- Natur, Ardabil, Iran
- Natur (Israeli settlement)
