= Sangabad, Ardabil =

Village in Ardabil province, Iran

Sangabad Persian: سنگ اباد
- Village
- Location within Iran
- Coordinates: 37°45′32″N 48°16′57″E
- Country: Iran
- Province: Ardabil
- County: Kowsar
- District: Central
- Rural District: Sanjabad-e Gharbi

Population (2016)
  - Total: 663
- Time zone: UTC+3:30 (IRST)

Sangabad (Persian: سنگ اباد) (Note: Also romanized as Sangābād; also known as Sanava, Sanjabad, Sanjābād, and Sendzhava) is a village in Sanjabad-e Gharbi Rural District of the Central District in Kowsar County, Ardabil province, Iran.

== Demographics ==
=== Population ===
At the time of the 2006 National Census, the village's population was 1,078 in 216 households. The following census in 2011 counted 780 people in 211 households. The 2016 census measured the population of the village as 663 people in 219 households.
