= Meresht =

Village in Ardabil province, Iran

Meresht Persian: مرشت
- Village
- Location within Iran
- Coordinates: 37°53′55″N 48°25′19″E
- Country: Iran
- Province: Ardabil
- County: Kowsar
- District: Central
- Rural District: Sanjabad-e Shomali

Population (2016)
  - Total: 263
- Time zone: UTC+3:30 (IRST)

Meresht (Persian: مرشت) (Note: Also known as Mīresh and Mirish) is a village in Sanjabad-e Shomali Rural District of the Central District in Kowsar County, Ardabil province, Iran.

== Demographics ==
=== Population ===
At the time of the 2006 National Census, the village's population was 444 in 101 households. The following census in 2011 counted 354 people in 86 households. The 2016 census measured the population of the village as 263 people in 62 households.
