= Lekvan, Kowsar =

Village in Ardabil province, Iran

Lekvan Persian: لکوان
- Village
- Location within Iran
- Coordinates: 37°36′05″N 48°12′19″E
- Country: Iran
- Province: Ardabil
- County: Kowsar
- District: Firuz
- Rural District: Sanjabad-e Jonubi

Population (2016)
  - Total: 70
- Time zone: UTC+3:30 (IRST)

Lekvan (Persian: لکوان) (Note: Also romanized as Lekvān; also known as Līkvān) is a village in Sanjabad-e Jonubi Rural District of Firuz District in Kowsar County, Ardabil province, Iran.

== Demographics ==
=== Population ===
At the time of the 2006 National Census, the village's population was 74 in 14 households. The following census in 2011 counted 73 people in 16 households. The 2016 census measured the population of the village as 70 people in 16 households.
