= Kajin =

Kajin (Persian: كجين) may refer to:

- Kajin, Ardabil
- Kajin, West Azerbaijan
