= Aqa Mirlu, Ardabil =

Village in Ardabil province, Iran

Aqa Mirlu Persian: اقاميرلو
- Village
- Location within Iran
- Coordinates: 37°46′39″N 48°09′45″E
- Country: Iran
- Province: Ardabil
- County: Kowsar
- District: Central
- Rural District: Sanjabad-e Gharbi

Population (2016)
  - Total: 627
- Time zone: UTC+3:30 (IRST)

Aqa Mirlu (Persian: اقاميرلو) (Note: Also romanized as Āqā Mīrlū) is a village in Sanjabad-e Gharbi Rural District of the Central District in Kowsar County, Ardabil province, Iran.

== Demographics ==
=== Population ===
At the time of the 2006 National Census, the village's population was 684 in 114 households. The following census in 2011 counted 665 people in 164 households. The 2016 census measured the population of the village as 627 people in 137 households.
