= Natur, Iran =

Village in Ardabil province, Iran

Natur Persian: ناطور
- Village
- Location within Iran
- Coordinates: 37°33′24″N 48°11′34″E
- Country: Iran
- Province: Ardabil
- County: Kowsar
- District: Firuz
- Rural District: Sanjabad-e Jonubi

Population (2016)
  - Total: 37
- Time zone: UTC+3:30 (IRST)

Natur (Persian: ناطور) (Note: Also romanized as Nāţūr) is a village in Sanjabad-e Jonubi Rural District of Firuz District in Kowsar County, Ardabil province, Iran.

== Demographics ==
=== Population ===
At the time of the 2006 National Census, the village's population was 68 in 18 households. The following census in 2011 counted 62 people in 16 households. The 2016 census measured the population of the village as 37 people in 13 households.
