= Mehrangiz =

Mehrangiz is a feminine given name of Iranic origin. Some notable people with this name include:

- Mehrangiz Dowlatshahi (1919–2008), Iranian social activist and politician
- Mehrangiz Kar (born 1944), Iranian human rights lawyer
- Mehrangiz Manouchehrian (1906–2000), Iranian lawyer and politician
- Mehrangiz Morovvati (born 1962), Iranian politician
