= Asfarjan =

Asfarjan (Persian: اسفرجان) may refer to:

- Asfarjan, Ardabil
- Asfarjan Rural District, in Isfahan Province
