= Gazvar-e Olya =

Village in Ardabil province, Iran

Gazvar-e Olya Persian: گزورعليا
- Village
- Location within Iran
- Coordinates: 37°50′29″N 48°19′05″E
- Country: Iran
- Province: Ardabil
- County: Kowsar
- District: Central
- Rural District: Sanjabad-e Shomali

Population (2016)
  - Total: 98
- Time zone: UTC+3:30 (IRST)

Gazvar-e Olya (Persian: گزورعليا) (Note: Also romanized as Gazūr-e ‘Olyā and Gazvar-e ‘Olyā; also known as Kazvaz-e ‘Olyā) is a village in Sanjabad-e Shomali Rural District of the Central District in Kowsar County, Ardabil province, Iran.

== Demographics ==
=== Population ===
At the time of the 2006 National Census, the village's population was 132 in 31 households. The following census in 2011 counted 144 people in 45 households. The 2016 census measured the population of the village as 98 people in 26 households.
