= Gol Qeshlaq, Ardabil =

Village in Ardabil province, Iran

Gol Qeshlaq Persian: گل قشلاق
- Village
- Location within Iran
- Coordinates: 37°49′25″N 48°14′27″E
- Country: Iran
- Province: Ardabil
- County: Kowsar
- District: Central
- Rural District: Sanjabad-e Gharbi

Population (2016)
  - Total: Below reporting threshold
- Time zone: UTC+3:30 (IRST)

Gol Qeshlaq (Persian: گل قشلاق) (Note: Also romanized as Gol Qeshlāq and Golqeshlāq; also known as Gol Qeshlāqī) is a village in Sanjabad-e Gharbi Rural District of the Central District in Kowsar County, Ardabil province, Iran.

== Demographics ==
=== Population ===
At the time of the 2006 National Census, the village's population was 15 in six households. The following census in 2011 counted a population below the reporting threshold. The 2016 census again measured the population of the village as below the reporting threshold.
