= Asfaranjan, Ardabil =

Village in Ardabil province, Iran

Asfaranjan Persian: اسفرنجان
- Village
- Location within Iran
- Coordinates: 37°48′07″N 48°13′45″E
- Country: Iran
- Province: Ardabil
- County: Kowsar
- District: Central
- Rural District: Sanjabad-e Gharbi

Population (2016)
  - Total: 113
- Time zone: UTC+3:30 (IRST)

Asfaranjan (Persian: اسفرنجان) (Note: Also romanized as Asfaranjān; also known as Asfarjān) is a village in Sanjabad-e Gharbi Rural District of the Central District in Kowsar County, Ardabil province, Iran.

== Demographics ==
=== Population ===
At the time of the 2006 National Census, the village's population was 85 in 16 households. The following census in 2011 counted 71 people in 23 households. The 2016 census measured the population of the village as 113 people in 39 households.
