= Ommabad, Ardabil =

Village in Ardabil province, Iran

Ommabad Persian: ام اباد
- Village
- Location within Iran
- Coordinates: 37°32′00″N 48°10′13″E
- Country: Iran
- Province: Ardabil
- County: Kowsar
- District: Firuz
- Rural District: Sanjabad-e Jonubi

Population (2016)
  - Total: 72
- Time zone: UTC+3:30 (IRST)

Ommabad (Persian: ام اباد) (Note: Also romanized as Amābād and Ommābād) is a village in Sanjabad-e Jonubi Rural District of Firuz District in Kowsar County, Ardabil province, Iran.

== Demographics ==
=== Population ===
At the time of the 2006 National Census, the village's population was 112 in 22 households. The following census in 2011 counted 109 people in 30 households. The 2016 census measured the population of the village as 72 people in 20 households.
