= Aghcheh Qeshlaq-e Olya, Ardabil =

Village in Ardabil province, Iran

Aghcheh Qeshlaq-e Olya Persian: اغچه قشلاق عليا
- Village
- Location within Iran
- Coordinates: 37°51′38″N 48°20′58″E
- Country: Iran
- Province: Ardabil
- County: Kowsar
- District: Central
- Rural District: Sanjabad-e Shomali

Population (2016)
  - Total: 16
- Time zone: UTC+3:30 (IRST)

Aghcheh Qeshlaq-e Olya (Persian: اغچه قشلاق عليا) (Note: Also romanized as Āghcheh Qeshlāq-e ‘Olyā; also known as Āghcheh Qeshlāq-e Bālā, Āqcheh Qeshlāq-e ‘Olyā, Aşlānlū, and Hasilanlu (‌حصيلانلو)) is a village in Sanjabad-e Shomali Rural District of the Central District in Kowsar County, Ardabil province, Iran.

== Demographics ==
=== Population ===
At the time of the 2006 National Census, the village's population was 33 in 10 households. The following census in 2011 counted 15 people in four households. The 2016 census measured the population of the village as 16 people in six households.
