= Zarjabad Rural District =

Rural district in Ardabil province, Iran

Zarjabad Rural District Persian: دهستان زرج آباد
- Rural District
- Location within Iran
- Coordinates: 37°38′N 48°04′E
- Country: Iran
- Province: Ardabil
- County: Kowsar
- District: Firuz
- Established: 1996
- Capital: Zarjabad

Population (2016)
  - Total: 2,233
- Time zone: UTC+3:30 (IRST)

Zarjabad Rural District (Persian: دهستان زرج آباد) is in Firuz District of Kowsar County, Ardabil province, Iran. Its capital is the village of Zarjabad.

== Demographics ==
=== Population ===
At the time of the 2006 National Census, the rural district's population was 3,587 in 776 households. There were 3,131 inhabitants in 850 households at the following census of 2011. The 2016 census measured the population of the rural district as 2,233 in 698 households. The most populous of its 13 villages was Zarjabad, with 778 people.

=== Other villages in the rural district ===
- Ahmadabad
- Burestan
- Dowlatabad
- Gilanduz
- Navand
- Qalin Qayah
- Quzlu
- Rostamabad
- Sharajabad
- Suflu
- Sulugoli Gol
- Zaviyeh-ye Zarjabad
