= Aepli =

Aepli is a surname. Notable people with the surname include:

- Arnold Otto Aepli (1816–1897), Swiss jurist and statesman
- Kurt Aepli (1914–2002), Swiss silversmith and educator

== See also ==
- Aebli
