= Mehrangiz Morovvati =

Iranian politician

member of Islamic Consultative Assembly
- In office 2000–2008
- Constituency: Khalkhal and Kowsar (electoral district)

Personal details
- Born: 1962; Khalkhal, Iran
- Political party: National Trust Party

Mehrangiz Morovvati (Persian: ‌‌مهرانگیز مروتی; born 1962) is an Iranian politician.

Morovvati was born in Khalkhal, Ardabil Province. He is a member of the 2000 and 2004 Islamic Consultative Assembly from the electorate of Khalkhal and Kowsar.
