= Firuzabad, Kowsar =

City in Ardabil province, Iran

Firuzabad Persian: فيروزاباد
- City
- Location within Iran
- Coordinates: 37°35′14″N 48°13′45″E
- Country: Iran
- Province: Ardabil
- County: Kowsar
- District: Firuz
- Established as a city: 2023

Population (2016)
  - Total: 489
- Time zone: UTC+3:30 (IRST)

Firuzabad (Persian: فيروزاباد) (Note: Also romanized as Fīrūzābād) is a city in, and the capital of, Firuz District in Kowsar County, Ardabil province, Iran. It also serves as the administrative center for Sanjabad-e Jonubi Rural District.

== Demographics ==
=== Population ===
At the time of the 2006 National Census, Firuzabad's population was 319 in 83 households, when it was a village in Sanjabad-e Jonubi Rural District. The following census in 2011 counted 400 people in 110 households. The 2016 census measured the population of the village as 489 people in 132 households. It was the most populous village in its rural district.

Firuzabad was converted to a city in 2023.
