= Şərəfə =

- Municipality
- Location within Azerbaijan
- Coordinates: 39°03′56″N 48°40′48″E
- Country: Azerbaijan
- Rayon: Masally

Population
  - Total: 2,154
- Time zone: UTC+4 (AZT)
  - Summer (DST): UTC+5 (AZT)

Şərəfə (also, Sərəfə and Sharafa) is a village and municipality in the Masally Rayon of Azerbaijan. It has a population of 2,154.
