= Sanjabad-e Gharbi Rural District =

Rural district in Ardabil province, Iran

Sanjabad-e Gharbi Rural District Persian: دهستان سنجبد غربي
- Rural District
- Location within Iran
- Coordinates: 37°45′N 48°16′E
- Country: Iran
- Province: Ardabil
- County: Kowsar
- District: Central
- Established: 1987
- Capital: Ganjgah

Population (2016)
  - Total: 6,881
- Time zone: UTC+3:30 (IRST)

Sanjabad-e Gharbi Rural District (Persian: دهستان سنجبد غربي) is in the Central District of Kowsar County, Ardabil province, Iran. Its capital is the village of Ganjgah.

== Demographics ==
=== Population ===
At the time of the 2006 National Census, the rural district's population was 9,025 in 1,859 households. There were 8,090 inhabitants in 2,168 households at the following census of 2011. The 2016 census measured the population of the rural district as 6,881 in 2,055 households. The most populous of its 38 villages was Ganjgah, with 685 people.

=== Other villages in the rural district ===
- Ab-e Garm-e Givy
- Aftabeh
- Aliabad
- Aqa Mirlu
- Arseh Dowgah
- Asfaranjan
- Baghcheh Chiq
- Chalgarud
- Ebli-ye Olya
- Ebli-ye Sofla
- Farab
- Gol Qeshlaq
- Gol Tappeh
- Havashanq
- Heris
- Joghanab
- Kejin
- Lakandasht
- Nasirabad
- Ney Ahmad Beyg
- Nilaq
- Owch Bolagh
- Pardastlu
- Pargu
- Pir Aghaj
- Pir Bodagh
- Pirehney
- Qarah Qeshlaq
- Sangabad
- Shahsavarlu
- Shavir
- Sureh Barq
- Tabrizaq
- Tushmanlu
