= Aghcheh Qeshlaq-e Olya, East Azerbaijan =

Aghcheh Qeshlaq-e Olya اغچه قشلاق عليا
- Village
- Location within Iran
- Coordinates: 38°39′48″N 47°09′00″E
- Country: Iran
- Province: East Azerbaijan
- County: Kaleybar
- Bakhsh: Central
- Rural District: Peyghan Chayi

Population (2006)
  - Total: 74
- Time zone: UTC+3:30 (IRST)
  - Summer (DST): UTC+4:30 (IRDT)

Aghcheh Qeshlaq-e Olya (Persian: اغچه قشلاق عليا, also Romanized as Āghcheh Qeshlāq-e ‘Olyā; also known as Āghcheh Qeshlāq-e Bālā, Aghjeh Gheshlagh Jadīd, Āghjeh Qeshlāq-e Bālā, Agja Qishlāq, Āqcheh Qeshlāq-e Jadīd, Āqcheh Qeshlāq-e ‘Olyā, and Āqjeh Qeshlāq) is a village in Peyghan Chayi Rural District, in the Central District of Kaleybar County, East Azerbaijan Province, Iran. At the 2006 census, its population was 74, in 15 families.
