= Christian Aebli =

Swiss bobsledder (born 1978)

Personal information
- Nationality: Swiss
- Born: 1 July 1978 Seewis, Switzerland
- Years active: 1998–present

Sport
- Sport: Bobsleigh
- Event: Four-man

Achievements and titles
- Olympic finals: 2006 Winter Olympics – 8th place (four-man)
- World finals: 2005 FIBT World Championships – 6th place (four-man)

Christian Aebli (born July 1, 1978) is a Swiss bobsledder who has competed since 1998. He finished eighth in the four-man event at the 2006 Winter Olympics in Turin.

Aebli also competed at the FIBT World Championships, earning his best finish of sixth in the four-man event at Calgary in 2005.

Aebli was born in Seewis in the Prättigau Valley, near Davos.
