= Sanjabad-e Shomali Rural District =

Rural district in Ardabil province, Iran

Sanjabad-e Shomali Rural District Persian: دهستان سنجبد شمالی
- Rural District
- Location within Iran
- Coordinates: 37°52′N 48°26′E
- Country: Iran
- Province: Ardabil
- County: Kowsar
- District: Central
- Established: 1987
- Capital: Khalfelu

Population (2016)
  - Total: 3,517
- Time zone: UTC+3:30 (IRST)

Sanjabad-e Shomali Rural District (Persian: دهستان سنجبد شمالی) is in the Central District of Kowsar County, Ardabil province, Iran. Its capital is the village of Khalfelu.

== Demographics ==
=== Population ===
At the time of the 2006 National Census, the rural district's population was 5,182 in 1,039 households. There were 4,765 inhabitants in 1,177 households at the following census of 2011. The 2016 census measured the population of the rural district as 3,517 in 960 households. The most populous of its 27 villages was Karandaq, with 502 people.

=== Other villages in the rural district ===
- Aghcheh Qeshlaq-e Olya
- Aghcheh Qeshlaq-e Sofla
- Alankash
- Alu
- Aq Bash
- Arpa Chai
- Benamaran
- Bonyadabad
- Galin Qeshlaqi
- Gazvar-e Olya
- Gazvar-e Sofla
- Jafarlu
- Majdar
- Meresht
- Narlu
- Nowdeh
- Pir Zaman
- Qaleh Juq
- Qarakh Bolagh
- Saqqavaz
- Tarkeh Deh
- Vechin
- Zaviyeh-ye Kord
