= Aghcheh Qeshlaq, West Azerbaijan =

Aghcheh Qeshlaq اغچه قشلاق
- Village
- Location within Iran
- Coordinates: 38°29′18″N 45°00′29″E
- Country: Iran
- Province: West Azerbaijan
- County: Khoy
- Bakhsh: Central
- Rural District: Qarah Su

Population (2006)
  - Total: 408
- Time zone: UTC+3:30 (IRST)
  - Summer (DST): UTC+4:30 (IRDT)

Aghcheh Qeshlaq (Persian: اغچه قشلاق, also Romanized as Āghcheh Qeshlāq; also known as Āqcheh Qeshlāq and Īncheh Qeshlāq) is a village in Qarah Su Rural District, in the Central District of Khoy County, West Azerbaijan Province, Iran. At the 2006 census, its population was 408, in 71 families.
