= Aghcheh Qeshlaq, East Azerbaijan =

Aghcheh Qeshlaq اغچه قشلاق
- Village
- Country: Iran
- Province: East Azerbaijan
- County: Meyaneh
- Bakhsh: Kandovan
- Rural District: Tirchai

Population (2006)
  - Total: 22
- Time zone: UTC+3:30 (IRST)
  - Summer (DST): UTC+4:30 (IRDT)

Aghcheh Qeshlaq (Persian: اغچه قشلاق, also Romanized as Āghcheh Qeshlāq) is a village in Tirchai Rural District, Kandovan District, Meyaneh County, East Azerbaijan Province, Iran. At the 2006 census, its population was 22, in 6 families.
