= Aqa Mirlu, Khoda Afarin =

Aqa Mirlu اقاميرلو
- Village
- Location within Iran
- Coordinates: 38°49′00″N 46°41′00″E
- Country: Iran
- Province: East Azerbaijan
- County: Khoda Afarin
- Bakhsh: Minjavan
- Rural District: Minjavan-e Gharbi

Population (2006)
  - Total: 35
- Time zone: UTC+3:30 (IRST)
  - Summer (DST): UTC+4:30 (IRDT)

Aqa Mirlu (Persian: اقاميرلو, also Romanized as Āqā Mīrlū; also known as Agamiry, Āgha Mīri, and Āqā Mīrī) is a village in Minjavan-e Gharbi Rural District, Minjavan District, Khoda Afarin County, East Azerbaijan Province, Iran. At the 2006 census, its population was 35, in 9 families.
