= Gorgabad, Kerman =

Gorgabad گرگ آباد
- Village
- Location within Iran
- Coordinates: 28°26′00″N 57°45′00″E
- Country: Iran
- Province: Kerman
- County: Anbarabad
- Bakhsh: Central
- Rural District: Aliabad

Population (2006)
  - Total: 69
- Time zone: UTC+3:30 (IRST)
  - Summer (DST): UTC+4:30 (IRDT)

Gorgabad (Persian: گرگ آباد, also romanized as Gorgābād; also known as Gorgābād-e Pā’īn) is a village in Aliabad Rural District, in the Central District of Anbarabad County, Kerman Province, Iran. At the 2006 census, its population was 69, in 17 families.
