= Aqjeh Qeshlaq =

Aqjeh Qeshlaq اقجه قشلاق
- Village
- Location within Iran
- Coordinates: 36°32′26″N 49°22′58″E
- Country: Iran
- Province: Qazvin
- County: Qazvin
- Bakhsh: Tarom Sofla
- Rural District: Niyarak

Population (2006)
  - Total: 115
- Time zone: UTC+3:30 (IRST)
  - Summer (DST): UTC+4:30 (IRDT)

Aqjeh Qeshlaq (Persian: اقجه قشلاق, also Romanized as Āqjeh Qeshlāq, Āghcheh Qeshlāq, Āqjā Qeshlāq, and Āqja Qishlāq; also known as Andzha-Kishlak) is a village in Niyarak Rural District, Tarom Sofla District, Qazvin County, Qazvin Province, Iran. At the 2006 census, its population was 115, in 25 families.
