= Sanjabad-e Jonubi Rural District =

Rural district in Ardabil province, Iran

Sanjabad-e Jonubi Rural District Persian: دهستان سنجبد جنوبي
- Rural District
- Location within Iran
- Coordinates: 37°34′N 48°12′E
- Country: Iran
- Province: Ardabil
- County: Kowsar
- District: Firuz
- Established: 1987
- Capital: Firuzabad

Population (2016)
  - Total: 2,395
- Time zone: UTC+3:30 (IRST)

Sanjabad-e Jonubi Rural District (Persian: دهستان سنجبد جنوبي) is in Firuz District of Kowsar County, Ardabil province, Iran. It is administered from the city of Firuzabad.

== Demographics ==
=== Population ===
At the time of the 2006 National Census, the rural district's population was 3,211 in 690 households. There were 3,054 inhabitants in 797 households at the following census of 2011. The 2016 census measured the population of the rural district as 2,395 in 691 households. The most populous of its 26 villages was Firuzabad (now a city), with 489 people.

=== Other villages in the rural district ===
- Afshar-e Olya
- Ala ol Din
- Amirabad
- Azimabad
- Boneh-ye Khalkhal
- Dowgar
- Goli Jan
- Gorgabad
- Heshin
- Ilkhchi
- Kachal Daraq
- Komoq
- Lekvan
- Mashkul
- Mikailabad
- Natur
- Ommabad
- Sekarabad
- Sharafabad
- Yengejeh-ye Qeshlaq
- Zenab
