= Gorgabad, West Azerbaijan =

Gorgabad گرگ اباد
- Village
- Location within Iran
- Coordinates: 36°12′51″N 45°31′36″E
- Country: Iran
- Province: West Azerbaijan
- County: Sardasht
- Bakhsh: Central
- Rural District: Gavork-e Sardasht

Population (2006)
  - Total: 22
- Time zone: UTC+3:30 (IRST)
  - Summer (DST): UTC+4:30 (IRDT)

Gorgabad (Persian: گرگ اباد, also Romanized as Gorgābād) is a village in Gavork-e Sardasht Rural District, in the Central District of Sardasht County, West Azerbaijan Province, Iran. At the 2006 census, its population was 22, in 4 families.
