= Hans Aebli =

Swiss educationist, theorist, and researcher

Hans Aebli (born 6 August 1923, Zürich – 26 July 1990, Burgdorf) was a Swiss educationist, theorist, and researcher whose main focus was evolutionary psychology. His doctoral advisor was Jean Piaget.
