= Kivi, Iran =

City in Ardabil province, Iran

Kivi Persian: کیوی
- City
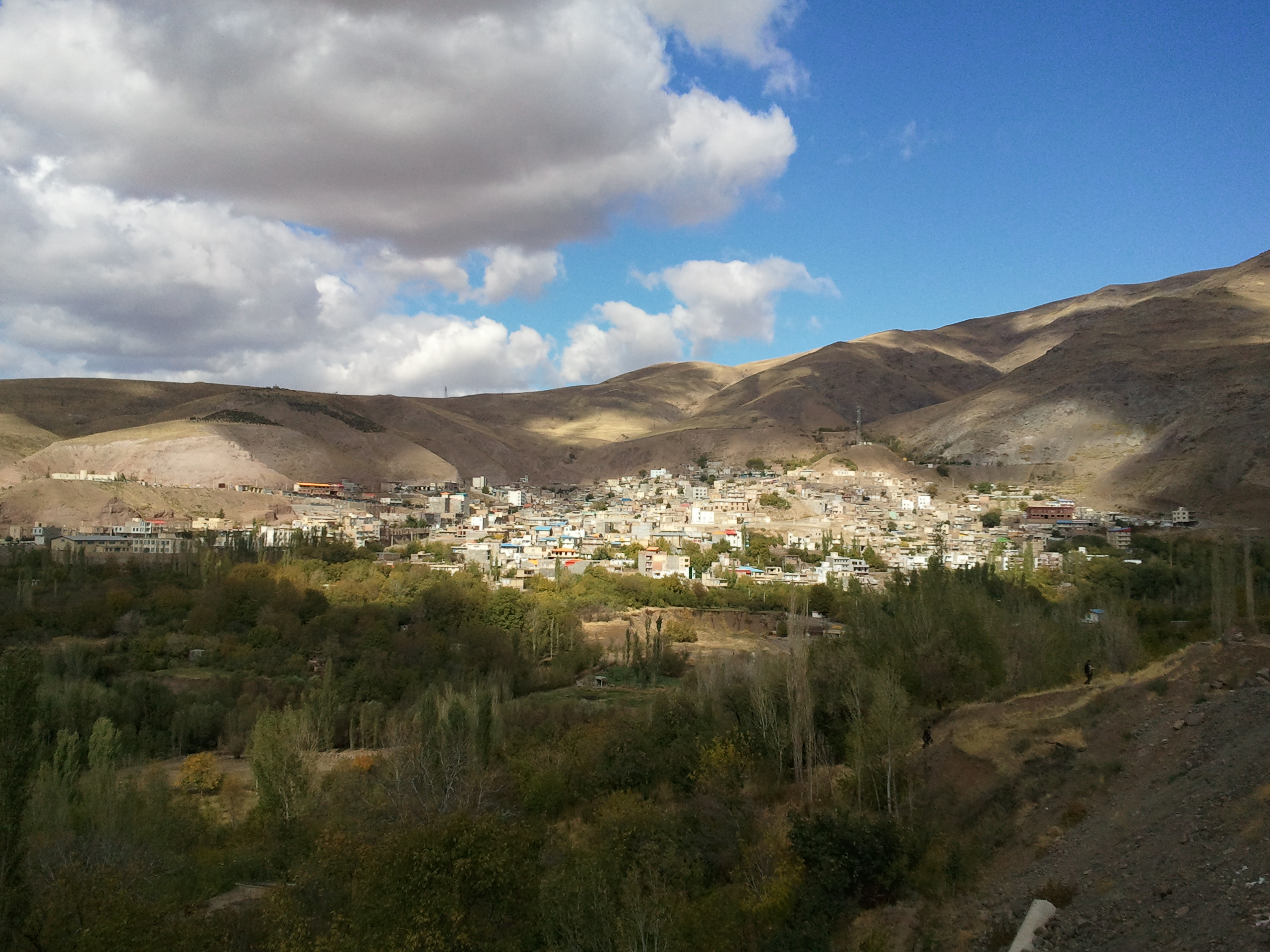
- The city of Kivi

- Location within Iran
- Coordinates: 37°41′33″N 48°19′55″E
- Country: Iran
- Province: Ardabil
- County: Kowsar
- District: Central

Population (2016)
  - Total: 7,101
- Time zone: UTC+3:30 (IRST)
- Kivi, Iran at GEOnet Names Server and Kivi, Iran at GEOnet Names Server

Kivi (Persian: کیوی) (Note: Also romanized as Kīvī; also known as Givi (گیوی) and Küyü) is a city in the Central District of Kowsar County, Ardabil province, Iran, serving as capital of both the county and the district.

== Demographics ==
=== Population ===
At the time of the 2006 National Census, the city's population was 6,467 in 1,721 households. The following census in 2011 counted 7,158 people in 1,974 households. The 2016 census measured the population of the city as 7,101 people in 2,182 households.

Media related to Kivi, Iran at Wikimedia Commons
