= Khalkhal, Iran =

City in Ardabil province, Iran

Khalkhal Persian: خلخال Azerbaijani: هیرو
- City
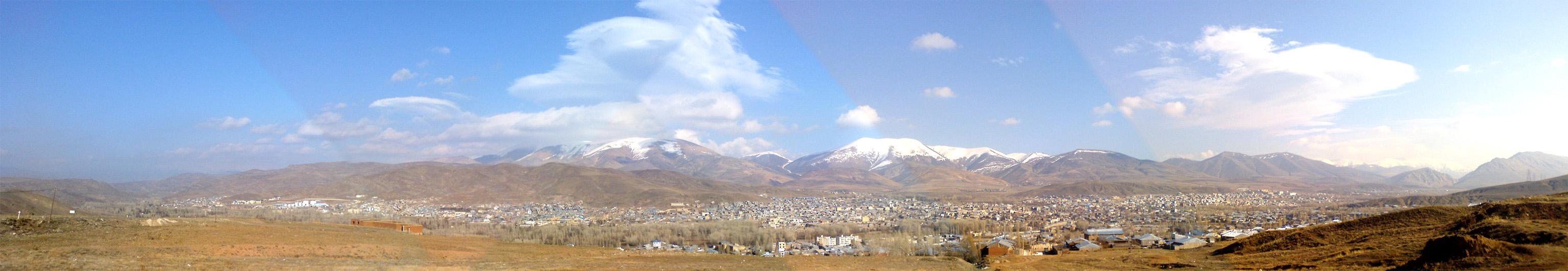
- City view

- Location within Iran
- Coordinates: 37°36′53″N 48°31′53″E
- Country: Iran
- Province: Ardabil
- County: Khalkhal
- District: Central

Population (2016)
  - Total: 39,304
- Time zone: UTC+3:30 (IRST)
- Website: www.khalkhalim.com

Khalkhal (Persian: خلخال) (Note: Also romanized as Khalkhāl; formerly and locally known as Herowabad (هروآباد), Hero Abad, Heroabad, and Hirow (Azerbaijani: هیرو)) is a city in the Central District of Khalkhal County, Ardabil province, Iran, serving as capital of both the county and the district. is a city in the Central District of Khalkhal County, Ardabil province, Iran, serving as capital of both the county and the district.

== Historical names ==
The central part of Khalkhal city has been known by several names throughout history. Some of these historical or alternative names include:

- Herowabad (هروآباد)
- Hero Abad
- Heroabad
- Hirow (Azerbaijani: هیرو)

These names are documented in historical sources and local references.

== Demographics ==
At the time of the 2006 National Census, the city's population was 38,521 in 9,619 households. The following census in 2011 counted 41,165 people in 11,213 households. The 2016 census measured the population of the city as 39,304 people in 11,501 households.

== Etymology and history ==
According to Vladimir Minorsky, the name Khalkhāl may indicate a connection with the ancient Kharkhar kingdom, which existed somewhere in the eastern Zagros Mountains in Neo-Assyrian times.

The 14th-century author Hamdallah Mustawfi listed Khalkhal in his Nuzhat al-Qulub as forming part of the tuman of Ardabil. He described it as "formerly a fair-sized town" that had declined to a mere village by his time. He wrote that Khalkhal had succeeded the earlier city of Firuzabad as the capital of its province after Firuzabad itself had declined. Mustawfi wrote that the Khalkhal province comprised about 100 villages and had four districts: Khāmidah-Bīl, Sajasrūd, Anjīlābād, and Mīsjīn. It was assessed for a tax value of 30,000 dinars. Water from a spring on a nearby mountain powered two watermills, which provided enough irrigation for the surrounding fields. Mustawfi said its pastures were "excellent" and hunting grounds were "numerous and well-stocked with game" and wrote that the district was known for producing yogurt (māst) that was "so thick it has to be cut with a knife, as though it were cheese".

== See also ==
- Lerd Village
- Khalkhal Khanate

Media related to Khalkhal at Wikimedia Commons
