= Firuz District =

District in Ardabil province, Iran

Firuz District Persian: بخش فیروز
- District
- Location within Iran
- Coordinates: 37°35′N 48°11′E
- Country: Iran
- Province: Ardabil
- County: Kowsar
- Established: 1996
- Capital: Firuzabad

Population (2016)
  - Total: 4,628
- Time zone: UTC+3:30 (IRST)

Firuz District (Persian: بخش فیروز) is in Kowsar County, Ardabil province, Iran. Its capital is the city of Firuzabad.

== History ==
The village of Firuzabad was converted to a city in 2023.

== Demographics ==
=== Population ===
At the time of the 2006 National Census, the district's population was 6,798 in 1,466 households. The following census in 2011 counted 6,185 people in 1,647 households. The 2016 census measured the population of the district as 4,628 inhabitants living in 1,389 households.

=== Administrative divisions ===
Firuz District Population
Administrative Divisions	2006	2011	2016
Sanjabad-e Jonubi RD	3,211	3,054	2,395
Zarjabad RD	3,587	3,131	2,233
Firuzabad (city) (Note: Became a city after the 2016 census)			
Total	6,798	6,185	4,628
RD = Rural District
