= Central District (Kowsar County) =

District in Ardabil province, Iran

Central District (Kowsar County) Persian: بخش مرکزی شهرستان کوثر
- District
- Location within Iran
- Coordinates: 37°48′N 48°19′E
- Country: Iran
- Province: Ardabil
- County: Kowsar
- Established: 1996
- Capital: Kivi

Population (2016)
  - Total: 17,499
- Time zone: UTC+3:30 (IRST)

The Central District of Kowsar County (Persian: بخش مرکزی شهرستان کوثر) is in Ardabil province, Iran. Its capital is the city of Kivi.

== Demographics ==
=== Population ===
According to the 2006 National Census, the district's population was 20,674 in 4,619 households. The 2011 census counted 20,013 people in 5,319 households. The 2016 census measured the district's population at 17,499 inhabitants in 5,197 households.

=== Administrative divisions ===
Central District (Kowsar County) Population
Administrative Divisions	2006	2011	2016
Sanjabad-e Gharbi RD	9,025	8,090	6,881
Sanjabad-e Shomali RD	5,182	4,765	3,517
Kivi (city)	6,467	7,158	7,101
Total	20,674	20,013	17,499
RD = Rural District
