= Kowsar County =

County in Ardabil province, Iran

Kowsar County Persian: شهرستان کوثر
- County
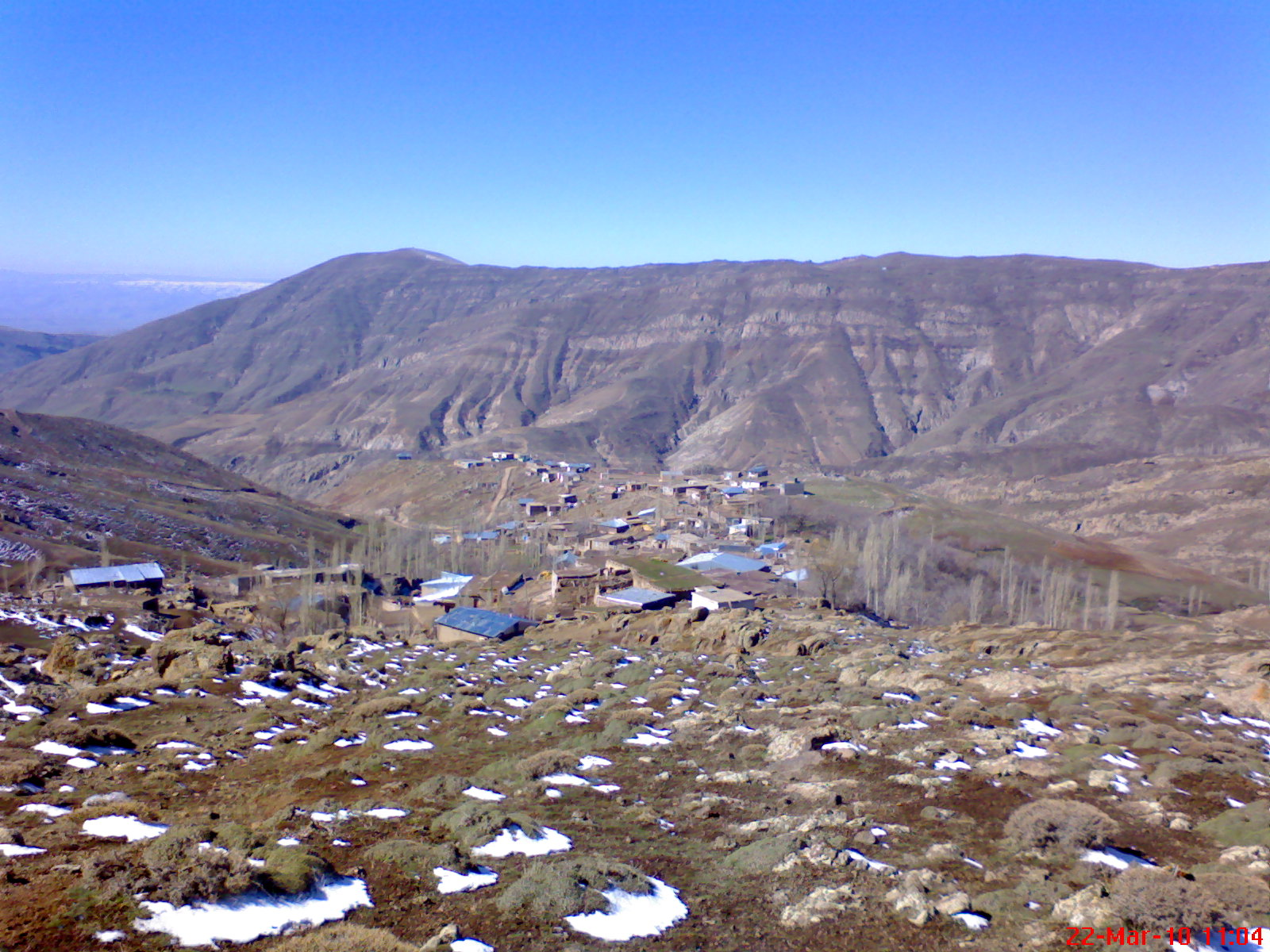
- The village of Havashanq

- Location of Kowsar County in Ardabil province (bottom, purple)

- Location of Ardabil province in Iran
- Coordinates: 37°43′N 48°22′E
- Country: Iran
- Province: Ardabil
- Established: 1996
- Capital: Kivi
- Districts: Central, Firuz

Population (2016)
  - Total: 22,127
- Time zone: UTC+3:30 (IRST)

Kowsar County (Persian: شهرستان کوثر) is in Ardabil province, Iran. Its capital is the city of Kivi.

== History ==
The village of Firuzabad was converted to a city in 2023.

== Demographics ==
=== Population ===
At the time of the 2006 National Census, the county's population was 27,472 in 6,085 households. The following census in 2011 counted 26,198 people in 6,960 households. The 2016 census measured the population of the county as 22,127 in 6,586 households.

=== Administrative divisions ===
Kowsar County's population history and administrative structure over three consecutive censuses are shown in the following table.

Kowsar County Population
Administrative Divisions	2006	2011	2016
Central District	20,674	20,013	17,499
Sanjabad-e Gharbi RD	9,025	8,090	6,881
Sanjabad-e Shomali RD	5,182	4,765	3,517
Kivi (city)	6,467	7,158	7,101
Firuz District	6,798	6,185	4,628
Sanjabad-e Jonubi RD	3,211	3,054	2,395
Zarjabad RD	3,587	3,131	2,233
Firuzabad (city) (Note: Became a city after the 2016 census)			
Total	27,472	26,198	22,127
RD = Rural District

== See also ==
Media related to Kowsar County at Wikimedia Commons
