= 1958 Firuzabad earthquake =

Natural disaster in Iran

- Location within Iran
- UTC time: 1958-08-16 19:13:48
- ISC event: 884953
- USGS-ANSS: ComCat
- Local date: August 16, 1958
- Local time: 22:43:48
- Magnitude: 6.7 M_{w}
- Depth: 15 km (9 mi)
- Epicenter: 34.290°N 47.867°E
- Areas affected: Iran
- Max. intensity: MMI IX (Violent)
- Foreshocks: Yes
- Aftershocks: Yes
- Casualties: 132 killed, 948 injured

The 1958 Firuzabad earthquake affected Hamadan province, Iran, on 16 August at 22:43. The M_{w} 6.7 earthquake occurred at a depth of 15 km (9.3 mi), nine months after another severe earthquake struck the same area. It caused severe damage to over 170 villages in the province. Because of several strong foreshocks, most of the population had fled their homes: the death toll thus only reached 132, with 948 injured. A destructive aftershock on 21 September killed another 16 people.

The geological region where the earthquake occurred, the Zagros Mountains, is seismically active due to ongoing tectonic convergence. As a result, the mountains hosts active faults and a fold and thrust belt to accommodate the convergence. One of these active faults is the Main Recent Fault, a right-lateral strike-slip fault. The earthquake occurred along part of this fault and surface ruptures were reported on four segments.

== Tectonic setting ==
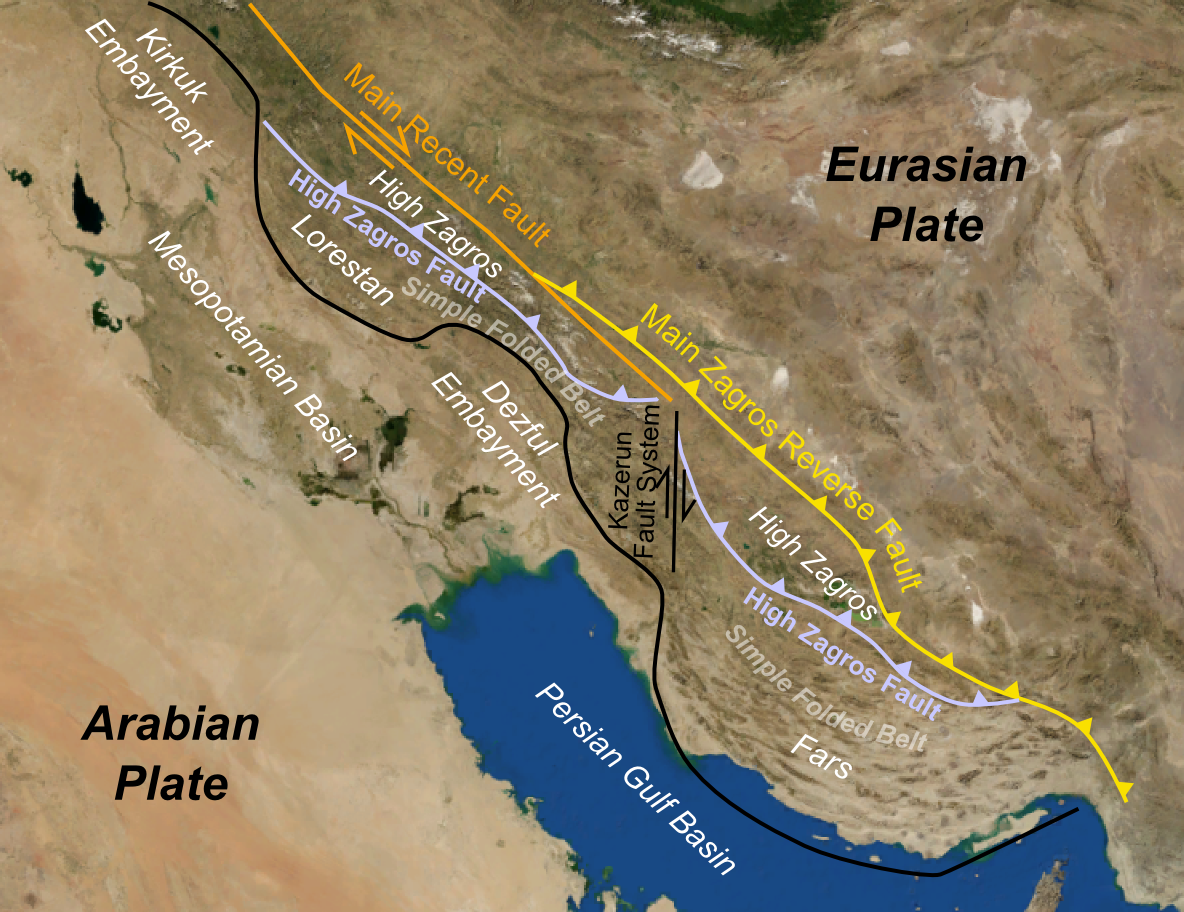
The northeast-trending Main Recent Fault in the Zagros Mountains

The Zagros Mountains, stretching for 1,500 km (930 mi) from Turkey, through Iran and Iraq, to the Gulf of Oman, formed from continental collision involving the Arabian plate and Central Iran. Its formation occurred during the late-Triassic, late-Jurassic, late-Cretaceous, Oligocene and Pliocene epochs. During its early formation, some extensional tectonics may have occurred. The mountain range is still accommodating deformation, evident from present-day seismicity. Deformation is accommodated by thrust and strike-slip faulting within the range. Parallel to the major thrust faults of the mountains is the Main Recent Fault, an active right-lateral strike-slip fault. Convergence between the Arabian plate and Iran occurs obliquely along the Zagros Mountains, and approximately 30–50 percent of the ~25 cm (9.8 in) per year convergence between the two plates is accommodated along the range.

The Main Recent Fault delineates the northeastern boundary of the seismically active Zagros Mountains, having formed about five million years ago. It runs parallel to the Main Zagros Reverse Fault, a suture zone separating the metamorphic rocks of the Sanandaj-Sirjan Zone from the fold and thrust belt. The fault comprises several segments with lengths of more than 100 km (62 mi). Southwest of the Main Recent Fault lies the continental margin of Arabia, while the rocks to the northeast are of metamorphic and volcanic origin. Its southeastern segments end in a zone of north–northwest trending strike-slip faults that offset the series of mountainous features. The strike-slip component of this oblique convergence is accommodated along the Main Recent Fault. The southeastern segments are more seismically active in contrast to the northwestern segments.

== Earthquake ==
=== Foreshocks ===
Aftershock activity associated with the 13 December 1957 Farsinaj earthquake stopped in mid-February 1958. On 14 August, at 14:00 local time, a magnitude 5.7 earthquake was felt strongly in Asadabad, Nahavand and Tuyserkan, scaring residents. A magnitude 5.5 earthquake occurred at 19:30; described as violent, it damaged several nearby villages. These two shocks were accompanied by a series of smaller earthquakes; the largest measuring 4.7. There was also a magnitude 4.5 event two hours prior to the mainshock on 17 August, causing minor damage to villages. These earthquakes caused panic among the populations and the tourists of Hamadan fled the city because of the activity.

=== Mainshock ===
The mainshock and its aftershocks occurred southeast of the 1957 earthquake epicenter. Both earthquakes occurred along different segments of the Main Recent Fault. Three sets of surface rupture occurred; all trending northwest–southeast on segments of the Main Recent Fault exhibited vertical offsets. One of these ran 15 km (9.3 mi) between Givaki and Cheshmeh Mahi produced up to 2 m (6 ft 7 in) of vertical offset. The rupture extended across the Garrin segment to the southeast and Sahneh segment to the northwest. The Nahavand segment was associated with another 20 km (12 mi) surface rupture that extended form Barreh Farakh to Leylan. The third surface rupture zone ran for 8 km (5.0 mi) and coincided with the southeastern part of the Sahneh segment.

The earthquake was felt for 80,000 km^{2} (31,000 sq mi); a significantly smaller extent in comparison with the 1957 shock (180,000 km^{2} (69,000 sq mi)). Modified Mercalli intensity VII (Very strong) was assigned in the meizoseismal area although there were plausibly isolated instances of IX (Violent) effects. However, this was impossible to confirm as these adobe buildings are easily destroyed in VI–VII (Strong–Very strong) conditions. In the meizoseismal zone, there was no clear distinction between infrastructure damaged by the 1957 shock and its aftershocks from damage during the 1958 earthquake.

The mainshock killed at least 132 people, injured hundreds and killed 3,000 livestock. Approximately 2,500 homes across 170 villages were levelled, rendering 10,000 homeless. The low death toll was partly the result of a foreshock that kept residents alert and a period of hot weather that compelled them to sleep on their roofs.

The earthquake devastated the Khezel, Solgi and Deh Now-e Sofla districts. The meizoseismal area encompassed a 1,100 km^{2} (420 sq mi) area along the Gamasiab River, and damage was greatest in the northwest. Four settlements, Leylas-Leylan, Jafarabad and Litagar, situated in the northwest meizoseismal zone, experienced the greatest devastation. Located some 10 km (6.2 mi) from Deh-e Bozorg-e Firuzabad, these villages were also affected by the 1957 earthquake and its aftershocks. All homes were razed, and in Leylas, cows were knocked off their feet and residents had difficulty maintaining their balance. About 200 people died or were injured in these villages.

The village of Rudbari was damaged by landslides and slumps. All homes in Hoseynabad and Sharifabad were flattened; the latter settlement reported heavy livestock loss and 16 injuries. In Firuzabad, two people died from toppled adobe walls. The village of Dehkuhneh was in the process of reuilding after the 1957 shock when it was completely devastated again; there were two deaths and 23 injuries. Slumping of a riverbank near Deh-e Bozorg-e Firuzabad damaged a bridge while the village experienced widespread damage and collapses. The shaking at Asadabad collapsed one home in the city and buried a person. Three people died and nine were injured in the flattened town of Barfaragh.

=== Aftershocks ===
The mainshock was followed by three aftershocks exceeding magnitude 5.0; another thirty had magnitudes between 4.0 and 4.9. On 17 August, one damaged several homes in Kangavar and two in Karkhaneh. Several people died in Asadabad and Akbarabad when homes crumbled during an aftershock in the early morning of 19 August. The most destructive aftershock occurred in Dinavar District on 21 September, devastating a 100 km^{2} (39 sq mi) region northwest of the 1957 meizoseismal area. Preceded by a damaging sequence of earthquakes several hours earlier, this magnitude 5.2 shock killed 16 people and devastated Karkasar, Karaj, Balajub, Gamshah, and Kolehjub. Fifty-seven injuries were reported in the villages of Karkasar and Karaj. Some homes in Karaj sustained damage.

== See also ==
- List of earthquakes in 1958
- List of earthquakes in Iran
