= Deh Firuzvand =

Deh Firuzvand (Persian: فروزوند) may refer to:

- Deh Firuzvand-e Bala
- Deh Firuzvand-e Pain
- Deh Firuzvand-e Vosta
