= Karaj (disambiguation) =

Karaj is a city in Alborz province, Iran.

Karaj (Persian: كرج) may also refer to:

== Places in Iran ==
- Karaj County, an administrative division of Alborz province
- Karaj, Ardabil, a village in Khalkhal County, Ardabil province also known as Kazaj
- Karaj-e Olya, a village in Sahneh County, Kermanshah province
- Karaj-e Sofla, a village in Sahneh County, Kermanshah province
- Karaj River

== Other ==
- Anand Karaj, the Sikh marriage ceremony, meaning "Blissful Union" or "Joyful Union"
