= Gavan =

Gavan may refer to:

== People ==
=== First name ===
- Gavan Daws (born 1933), American writer, historian, and filmmaker from Hawaii
- Gavan Duffy (1874–1958), Canadian lawyer, judge, and political figure
- Gavan Herlihy (born 1947), New Zealand politician
- Gavan Horsley (born 1933), Australian rugby union player
- Gavan Levenson (born 1953), South African professional golfer
- Gavan McCarthy (born 1945), Australian rules footballer
- Gavan McCormack, Australian researcher specializing in East Asia
- Gavan McDonell (born 1932), Australian civil engineer
- Gavan Moran (1936–1983), Australian rules footballer
- Gavan O'Connor (born 1947), Australian politician
- Gavan O'Herlihy (1951–2021), Irish actor
- Gavan Whelan, former member of James, an English rock band from Manchester

=== Last name ===
- Alexandru Găvan (born 1982), Romanian mountain climber
- John Gavan (1640–1679), English Jesuit
- Paul Gavan (born 1965), Irish politician

== Fictional characters ==
- Gavan, from Space Sheriff Gavan, a Japanese TV series, and Space Sheriff Gavan: The Movie, a 2012 movie

== Places ==
- Gavan, Karnataka, India, a village
- Gavan, Ardabil, Iran, a village
- Gavan-e Pain, Iran, a village
- Gavan Municipal Okrug, a municipal okrug in Vasileostrovsky District of the federal city of St. Petersburg, Russia
- Găvan River (disambiguation)

== See also ==
- Kavan (disambiguation)
- Gavin, a masculine given name and a surname
- Sovetskaya Gavan, a town in Khabarovsk Krai, Russia
