= Qusajin =

Village in Ardabil province, Iran

Qusajin Persian: قوسجين
- Village
- Location within Iran
- Coordinates: 37°25′39″N 48°13′57″E
- Country: Iran
- Province: Ardabil
- County: Khalkhal
- District: Khvoresh Rostam
- Rural District: Khvoresh Rostam-e Shomali

Population (2016)
  - Total: 60
- Time zone: UTC+3:30 (IRST)

Qusajin (Persian: قوسجين) (Note: Also romanized as Qūsajīn; also known as Gūsūn, Qūsajan, and Qūsūn) is a village in Khvoresh Rostam-e Shomali Rural District of Khvoresh Rostam District in Khalkhal County, Ardabil province, Iran. It is located west of the Qizil Üzan river, in the Alborz (Elburz) mountain range.

== Demographics ==
=== Population ===
At the time of the 2006 National Census, the village's population was 97 in 31 households. The following census in 2011 counted 86 people in 31 households. The 2016 census measured the population of the village as 60 people in 30 households.
