= Deh Kabud =

Deh Kabud and Deh-e Kabud (Persian: ده كبود, meaning "blue/gray village") may refer to:

- Deh-e Kabud, Hamadan
- Deh-e Kabud, Kermanshah
- Deh Kabud, Lorestan
