= Tarik Darreh (disambiguation) =

Tarik Darreh is a village in Gilan Province, Iran.

Tarik Darreh (Persian: تاريك دره) may also refer to:

- Tarik Darreh-ye Bala, Hamadan Province
- Tarik Darreh-ye Pain, Hamadan Province

== See also ==
- Darreh Tarik
