= Khvoresh Rostam =

Khvoresh Rostam (Persian: خورش رستم) may refer to:

- Khvoresh Rostam District
- Khvoresh Rostam-e Jonubi Rural District
- Khvoresh Rostam-e Shomali Rural District
