= Abd ol Maleki =

Abd ol Maleki (Persian: عبدالملكي) may refer to:

- Abd ol Maleki, Hamadan
- Abd ol Maleki, Kermanshah
- Abd ol Maleki, Razavi Khorasan
