= Tuyestan =

Village in Ardabil province, Iran

Tuyestan Persian: طويستان
- Village
- Location within Iran
- Coordinates: 37°14′51″N 48°27′31″E
- Country: Iran
- Province: Ardabil
- County: Khalkhal
- District: Khvoresh Rostam
- Rural District: Khvoresh Rostam-e Jonubi

Population (2016)
  - Total: 208
- Time zone: UTC+3:30 (IRST)

Tuyestan (Persian: طويستان) (Note: Also romanized as Ţavīstān and Ţūyestān) is a village in Khvoresh Rostam-e Jonubi Rural District of Khvoresh Rostam District in Khalkhal County, Ardabil province, Iran.

== Demographics ==
=== Population ===
At the time of the 2006 National Census, the village's population was 268 in 56 households. The following census in 2011 counted 242 people in 57 households. The 2016 census measured the population of the village as 208 people in 56 households.
