= Aznahri =

Village in Hamadan province, Iran

Aznahri Persian: ازنهري
- Village
- Location within Iran
- Coordinates: 34°14′15″N 48°08′56″E
- Country: Iran
- Province: Hamadan
- County: Nahavand
- District: Zarrin Dasht
- Rural District: Garin

Population (2016)
  - Total: 959
- Time zone: UTC+3:30 (IRST)

Aznahri (Persian: ازنهري) (Note: Also romanized as Aznahrī and Eznahrī) is a village in Garin Rural District of Zarrin Dasht District in Nahavand County, Hamadan province, Iran.

== Demographics ==
=== Population ===
At the time of the 2006 National Census, the village's population was 1,066 in 245 households. The following census in 2011 counted 1,114 people in 320 households. The 2016 census measured the population of the village as 959 people in 300 households.
