= Viu =

Viu or VIU may refer to:

== Universities ==
- Valencian International University, in Valencia, Spain
- Vancouver Island University, in British Columbia, Canada
- Venice International University, in Venice, Italy
- Veritas International University, in Santa Ana, California, United States
- Virginia International University, now Fairfax University of America, in Fairfax, Virginia, United States

== Media ==
- Viu (streaming service), over-the-top (OTT) video service
- ViuTV, Cantonese language channel in Hong Kong operated by HK Television Entertainment
  - ViuTVsix, a Hong Kong English-language television channel

== Other uses ==
- Viù, a commune in Turin, Italy
- Viu, Iran, a village
- Viu (building), a Canadian condominium
- Luis Viu (1943–2025), Spanish alpine skier
