= Ahu, Ardabil =

Village in Ardabil province, Iran

Ahu Persian: اهو
- Village
- Location within Iran
- Coordinates: 37°10′06″N 48°37′04″E
- Country: Iran
- Province: Ardabil
- County: Khalkhal
- District: Khvoresh Rostam
- Rural District: Khvoresh Rostam-e Jonubi

Population (2016)
  - Total: 54
- Time zone: UTC+3:30 (IRST)

Ahu (Persian: اهو) (Note: Also romanized as Āhū) is a village in Khvoresh Rostam-e Jonubi Rural District of Khvoresh Rostam District in Khalkhal County, Ardabil province, Iran.

== Demographics ==
=== Population ===
At the time of the 2006 National Census, the village's population was 94 in 21 households. The following census in 2011 counted 61 people in 16 households. The 2016 census measured the population of the village as 54 people in 20 households.
