= Anbar Qanbar =

Village in Hamadan province, Iran

Anbar Qanbar Persian: عنبرقنبر
- Village
- Location within Iran
- Coordinates: 34°14′50″N 48°14′34″E
- Country: Iran
- Province: Hamadan
- County: Nahavand
- District: Zarrin Dasht
- Rural District: Fazl

Population (2016)
  - Total: 486
- Time zone: UTC+3:30 (IRST)

Anbar Qanbar (Persian: عنبرقنبر) (Note: Also romanized as ‘Anbar Qanbar; also known as Qanbar ‘Anbar) is a village in Fazl Rural District of Zarrin Dasht District in Nahavand County, Hamadan province, Iran.

== Demographics ==
=== Population ===
At the time of the 2006 National Census, the village's population was 643 in 155 households. The following census in 2011 counted 610 people in 178 households. The 2016 census measured the population of the village as 486 people in 152 households.
