= Jafarabad, Khalkhal =

Village in Ardabil province, Iran

Jafarabad Persian: جعفرآباد
- Village
- Location within Iran
- Coordinates: 37°10′41″N 48°38′28″E
- Country: Iran
- Province: Ardabil
- County: Khalkhal
- District: Khvoresh Rostam
- Rural District: Khvoresh Rostam-e Jonubi

Population (2016)
  - Total: 119
- Time zone: UTC+3:30 (IRST)

Jafarabad (Persian: جعفرآباد) (Note: Also romanized as Ja‘farābād) is a village in Khvoresh Rostam-e Jonubi Rural District of Khvoresh Rostam District in Khalkhal County, Ardabil province, Iran.

== Demographics ==
=== Population ===
At the time of the 2006 National Census, the village's population was 231 in 52 households. The following census in 2011 counted 145 people in 44 households. The 2016 census measured the population of the village as 119 people in 48 households.
