= Givaki =

Village in Hamadan province, Iran

Givaki Persian: گيوكي
- Village
- Location within Iran
- Coordinates: 34°16′23″N 48°04′54″E
- Country: Iran
- Province: Hamadan
- County: Nahavand
- District: Khezel
- Rural District: Solgi

Population (2016)
  - Total: 594
- Time zone: UTC+3:30 (IRST)

Givaki (Persian: گيوكي) (Note: Also romanized as Gīvakī and Gīvkī; also known as Gīvahkī) is a village in Solgi Rural District of Khezel District in Nahavand County, Hamadan province, Iran.

== History ==
Givaki was affected by the 1958 Firuzabad earthquake. Contemporary field observations reported that 29 of the village's 59 houses collapsed, although the village suffered comparatively little damage compared with nearby settlements.

== Demographics ==
=== Population ===
At the time of the 2006 National Census, the village's population was 552 in 134 households. The following census in 2011 counted 596 people in 169 households. The 2016 census measured the population of the village as 594 people in 170 households.
