= Tarik Darreh-ye Bala =

Tarik Darreh-ye Bala تاريك دره بالا
- Village
- Location within Iran
- Coordinates: 34°16′24″N 47°56′21″E
- Country: Iran
- Province: Hamadan
- County: Nahavand
- Bakhsh: Khezel
- Rural District: Khezel-e Sharqi

Population (2006)
  - Total: 441
- Time zone: UTC+3:30 (IRST)
  - Summer (DST): UTC+4:30 (IRDT)

Tarik Darreh-ye Bala (Persian: تاريك دره بالا, also Romanized as Tārīk Darreh-ye Bālā; also known as Tārīk Darreh-ye ‘Olyā) is a village in Khezel-e Sharqi Rural District, Khezel District, Nahavand County, Hamadan Province, Iran. At the 2006 census, its population was 441, in 99 families.
