= Akbarabad, Zarrin Dasht =

Village in Hamadan province, Iran

Akbarabad Persian: اكبراباد
- Village
- Location within Iran
- Coordinates: 34°15′26″N 48°12′27″E
- Country: Iran
- Province: Hamadan
- County: Nahavand
- District: Zarrin Dasht
- Rural District: Fazl

Population (2016)
  - Total: 106
- Time zone: UTC+3:30 (IRST)

Akbarabad (Persian: اكبراباد) (Note: Also romanized as Akbarābād) is a village in Fazl Rural District of Zarrin Dasht District in Nahavand County, Hamadan province, Iran.

== Demographics ==
=== Population ===
At the time of the 2006 National Census, the village's population was 127 in 29 households. The following census in 2011 counted 139 people in 41 households. The 2016 census measured the population of the village as 106 people in 36 households.
