= Chenarlaq =

Village in Ardabil province, Iran

Chenarlaq Persian: چنارلق
- Village
- Location within Iran
- Coordinates: 37°08′37″N 48°38′11″E
- Country: Iran
- Province: Ardabil
- County: Khalkhal
- District: Khvoresh Rostam
- Rural District: Khvoresh Rostam-e Jonubi

Population (2016)
  - Total: 301
- Time zone: UTC+3:30 (IRST)

Chenarlaq (Persian: چنارلق) (Note: Also romanized as Chenārlaq; also known as Chenārlīq) is a village in Khvoresh Rostam-e Jonubi Rural District of Khvoresh Rostam District in Khalkhal County, Ardabil province, Iran.

== Demographics ==
=== Population ===
At the time of the 2006 National Census, the village's population was 569 in 133 households. The following census in 2011 counted 396 people in 107 households. The 2016 census measured the population of the village as 301 people in 105 households.
