= Vasaj =

Village in Hamadan province, Iran

Vasaj Persian: وسج
- Village
- Location within Iran
- Coordinates: 34°19′14″N 48°13′33″E
- Country: Iran
- Province: Hamadan
- County: Nahavand
- District: Khezel
- Rural District: Khezel-e Sharqi

Population (2016)
  - Total: 667
- Time zone: UTC+3:30 (IRST)

Vasaj (Persian: وسج) (Note: Also known as Vasanj, Vashāch, and Wasāch) is a village in Khezel-e Sharqi Rural District of Khezel District in Nahavand County, Hamadan province, Iran.

== Demographics ==
=== Population ===
At the time of the 2006 National Census, the village's population was 820 in 170 households. The following census in 2011 counted 771 people in 245 households. The 2016 census measured the population of the village as 667 people in 201 households.
