= Manamin =

Village in Ardabil province, Iran

Manamin Persian: منامين
- Village
- Location within Iran
- Coordinates: 37°17′08″N 48°22′16″E
- Country: Iran
- Province: Ardabil
- County: Khalkhal
- District: Khvoresh Rostam
- Rural District: Khvoresh Rostam-e Shomali

Population (2016)
  - Total: 280
- Time zone: UTC+3:30 (IRST)

Manamin (Persian: منامين) (Note: Also romanized as Manāmīn; also known as Manāman, Mānāmūn, Manānom, and Mananum) is a village in Khvoresh Rostam-e Shomali Rural District of Khvoresh Rostam District in Khalkhal County, Ardabil province, Iran.

== Demographics ==
=== Population ===
At the time of the 2006 National Census, the village's population was 357 in 111 households. The following census in 2011 counted 281 people in 102 households. The 2016 census measured the population of the village as 280 people in 91 households.
