= Sefid Ab, Ardabil =

Village in Ardabil province, Iran

Sefid Ab Persian: سفيداب
- Village
- Location within Iran
- Coordinates: 37°12′12″N 48°34′15″E
- Country: Iran
- Province: Ardabil
- County: Khalkhal
- District: Khvoresh Rostam
- Rural District: Khvoresh Rostam-e Jonubi

Population (2016)
  - Total: 266
- Time zone: UTC+3:30 (IRST)

Sefid Ab (Persian: سفيداب) (Note: Also romanized as Sefīd Āb; also known as Āsbū) is a village in Khvoresh Rostam-e Jonubi Rural District of Khvoresh Rostam District in Khalkhal County, Ardabil province, Iran.

== Demographics ==
=== Population ===
At the time of the 2006 National Census, the village's population was 344 in 80 households. The following census in 2011 counted 324 people in 85 households. The 2016 census measured the population of the village as 266 people in 91 households.
