= Now Deh, Khalkhal =

Village in Ardabil province, Iran

Now Deh Persian: نوده
- Village
- Location within Iran
- Coordinates: 37°21′14″N 48°27′19″E
- Country: Iran
- Province: Ardabil
- County: Khalkhal
- District: Khvoresh Rostam
- Rural District: Khvoresh Rostam-e Shomali

Population (2016)
  - Total: 117
- Time zone: UTC+3:30 (IRST)

Now Deh (Persian: نوده) (Note: Also known as Noudi and Noudy) is a village in Khvoresh Rostam-e Shomali Rural District of Khvoresh Rostam District in Khalkhal County, Ardabil province, Iran.

== Demographics ==
=== Population ===
At the time of the 2006 National Census, the village's population was 136 in 51 households. The following census in 2011 counted 106 people in 50 households. The 2016 census measured the population of the village as 117 people in 46 households.
