= Heshi =

Heshi may refer to:

== China ==
- Heshi, Fujian (河市镇), town in Luojiang District, Quanzhou
- Heshi, Miluo (河市镇), a town in Miluo City, Hunan province.
- Heshi, Ji'an (禾市镇), town in Taihe County, Jiangxi
- Heshi, Jinxi County (合市镇), town in Jiangxi
- Heshi, Xiushui County (何市镇), town in Jiangxi
- Heshi, Da County (河市镇), town in Sichuan
- Heshi, Zigong (何市镇), town in Da'an District, Zigong, Sichuan

== Iran ==
- Heshi, Iran, village in Ardabil Province
- Heshi, Sistan and Baluchestan, village in Sistan and Baluchestan Province
