= Habibabad, Hamadan =

Village in Hamadan province, Iran

Habibabad Persian: حبيب اباد
- Village
- Location within Iran
- Coordinates: 34°18′11″N 48°10′30″E
- Country: Iran
- Province: Hamadan
- County: Nahavand
- District: Khezel
- Rural District: Solgi

Population (2016)
  - Total: 426
- Time zone: UTC+3:30 (IRST)

Habibabad (Persian: حبيب اباد) (Note: Also romanized as Ḩabībābād) is a village in Solgi Rural District of Khezel District in Nahavand County, Hamadan province, Iran.

== Demographics ==
=== Population ===
At the time of the 2006 National Census, the village's population was 359 in 88 households. The following census in 2011 counted 404 people in 119 households. The 2016 census measured the population of the village as 426 people in 133 households.
