= Shahrak, Hamadan =

Village in Hamadan province, Iran

Shahrak Persian: شهرك
- Village
- Location within Iran
- Coordinates: 34°16′44″N 48°09′22″E
- Country: Iran
- Province: Hamadan
- County: Nahavand
- District: Khezel
- Rural District: Solgi

Population (2016)
  - Total: 2,884
- Time zone: UTC+3:30 (IRST)

Shahrak (Persian: شهرك) (Note: Also known as Sharq) is a village in, and the capital of, Solgi Rural District in Khezel District of Nahavand County, Hamadan province, Iran.

== Demographics ==
=== Population ===
At the time of the 2006 National Census, the village's population was 2,931 in 704 households. The following census in 2011 counted 2,901 people in 872 households. The 2016 census measured the population of the village as 2,884 people in 906 households.
