= Chenari, Nahavand =

Village in Hamadan province, Iran

Chenari Persian: چناري
- Village
- Location within Iran
- Coordinates: 34°13′52″N 48°10′33″E
- Country: Iran
- Province: Hamadan
- County: Nahavand
- District: Zarrin Dasht
- Rural District: Garin

Population (2016)
  - Total: 485
- Time zone: UTC+3:30 (IRST)

Chenari (Persian: چناري) (Note: Also romanized as Chenārī) is a village in Garin Rural District of Zarrin Dasht District in Nahavand County, Hamadan province, Iran.

== Demographics ==
=== Population ===
At the time of the 2006 National Census, the village's population was 574 in 146 households. The following census in 2011 counted 548 people in 163 households. The 2016 census measured the population of the village as 485 people in 146 households.
