= Kajal, Iran =

Village in Ardabil province, Iran

Kajal Persian: كجل
- Village
- Location within Iran
- Coordinates: 37°25′37″N 48°10′47″E
- Country: Iran
- Province: Ardabil
- County: Khalkhal
- District: Khvoresh Rostam
- Rural District: Khvoresh Rostam-e Shomali

Population (2016)
  - Total: 227
- Time zone: UTC+3:30 (IRST)

Kajal (Persian: كجل) (Note: Also romanized as Kejal; also known as Kachal, Kadzhal’, and Kharābeh-ye-Kachal) is a village in Khvoresh Rostam-e Shomali Rural District of Khvoresh Rostam District in Khalkhal County, Ardabil province, Iran.

== Demographics ==
=== Population ===
At the time of the 2006 National Census, the village's population was 460 in 127 households. The following census in 2011 counted 331 people in 122 households. The 2016 census measured the population of the village as 227 people in 99 households.

=== Language ===
Kajali dialect of Tati language is spoken in the village.
