= Vali Sir Ab =

Village in Hamadan province, Iran

Vali Sir Ab Persian: ولي سيراب
- Village
- Location within Iran
- Coordinates: 34°13′56″N 48°11′22″E
- Country: Iran
- Province: Hamadan
- County: Nahavand
- District: Zarrin Dasht
- Rural District: Garin

Population (2016)
  - Total: 237
- Time zone: UTC+3:30 (IRST)

Vali Sir Ab (Persian: ولي سيراب) (Note: Also romanized as Valī Sīr Āb, Valī Sīrāb, and Valīsīrāb) is a village in Garin Rural District of Zarrin Dasht District in Nahavand County, Hamadan province, Iran.

== Demographics ==
=== Population ===
At the time of the 2006 National Census, the village's population was 229 in 62 households. The following census in 2011 counted 242 people in 76 households. The 2016 census measured the population of the village as 237 people in 74 households.
