= Khat Parast =

Village in Ardabil province, Iran

Khat Parast Persian: خط پرست
- Village
- Location within Iran
- Coordinates: 37°28′53″N 48°15′49″E
- Country: Iran
- Province: Ardabil
- County: Khalkhal
- District: Khvoresh Rostam
- Rural District: Khvoresh Rostam-e Shomali

Population (2016)
  - Total: 45
- Time zone: UTC+3:30 (IRST)

Khat Parast (Persian: خط پرست) (Note: Also romanized as Khaţ Parast and Khaţţ Parast) is a village in Khvoresh Rostam-e Shomali Rural District of Khvoresh Rostam District in Khalkhal County, Ardabil province, Iran.

== Demographics ==
=== Population ===
At the time of the 2006 National Census, the village's population was 55 in 11 households. The following census in 2011 counted 54 people in 13 households. The 2016 census measured the population of the village as 45 people in 12 households.
