= Farsban =

Village in Hamadan province, Iran

Farsban Persian: فارسبان
- Village
- Location within Iran
- Coordinates: 34°14′35″N 48°07′08″E
- Country: Iran
- Province: Hamadan
- County: Nahavand
- District: Khezel
- Rural District: Solgi

Population (2016)
  - Total: 1,099
- Time zone: UTC+3:30 (IRST)

Farsban (Persian: فارسبان) (Note: Also romanized as Fārsbān; also known as Fārespān, Fārsīān, Farsīyan, and Parīsvān) is a village in Solgi Rural District of Khezel District in Nahavand County, Hamadan province, Iran.

== Demographics ==
=== Population ===
At the time of the 2006 National Census, the village's population was 1,228 in 323 households. The following census in 2011 counted 1,189 people in 357 households. The 2016 census measured the population of the village as 1,099 people in 360 households.
