= Zaramin =

Zaramin or Zarramin (Persian: زرامين) may refer to:

- Zaramin-e Olya
- Zaramin-e Sofla
