= Asgarabad, Hamadan =

Village in Hamadan province, Iran

Asgarabad Persian: عسگراباد
- Village
- Location within Iran
- Coordinates: 34°13′14″N 48°13′04″E
- Country: Iran
- Province: Hamadan
- County: Nahavand
- District: Zarrin Dasht
- Rural District: Fazl

Population (2016)
  - Total: 484
- Time zone: UTC+3:30 (IRST)

Asgarabad (Persian: عسگراباد) (Note: Also romanized as ‘Asgarābād) is a village in Fazl Rural District of Zarrin Dasht District in Nahavand County, Hamadan province, Iran.

== Demographics ==
=== Population ===
At the time of the 2006 National Census, the village's population was 546 in 124 households. The following census in 2011 counted 533 people in 144 households. The 2016 census measured the population of the village as 484 people in 151 households.
