= Diz, Khvoresh Rostam =

Village in Ardabil province, Iran

Diz Persian: ديز
- Village
- Location within Iran
- Coordinates: 37°26′31″N 48°10′10″E
- Country: Iran
- Province: Ardabil
- County: Khalkhal
- District: Khvoresh Rostam
- Rural District: Khvoresh Rostam-e Shomali

Population (2016)
  - Total: 153
- Time zone: UTC+3:30 (IRST)

Diz (Persian: ديز) (Note: Also romanized as Dīz) is a village in Khvoresh Rostam-e Shomali Rural District of Khvoresh Rostam District in Khalkhal County, Ardabil province, Iran.

== Demographics ==
=== Population ===
At the time of the 2006 National Census, the village's population was 212 in 54 households. The following census in 2011 counted 186 people in 57 households. The 2016 census measured the population of the village as 153 people in 56 households.
