= Zaviyeh-ye Kivi =

Village in Ardabil province, Iran

Zaviyeh-ye Kivi Persian: زاويه كيوي
- Village
- Location within Iran
- Coordinates: 37°21′25″N 48°24′51″E
- Country: Iran
- Province: Ardabil
- County: Khalkhal
- District: Khvoresh Rostam
- Rural District: Khvoresh Rostam-e Shomali

Population (2016)
  - Total: 45
- Time zone: UTC+3:30 (IRST)

Zaviyeh-ye Kivi (Persian: زاويه كيوي) (Note: Also romanized as Zāvīyeh-ye Kīvī) is a village in Khvoresh Rostam-e Shomali Rural District of Khvoresh Rostam District in Khalkhal County, Ardabil province, Iran. It is located in the Alborz (Elburz) mountain range.

== Demographics ==
=== Population ===
At the time of the 2006 National Census, the village's population was 57 in 20 households. The following census in 2011 counted 36 people in 15 households. The 2016 census measured the population of the village as 45 people in 17 households.
