= Aqsu, Ardabil =

Village in Ardabil province, Iran

Aqsu Persian: اق سو
- Village
- Location within Iran
- Coordinates: 37°20′56″N 48°33′37″E
- Country: Iran
- Province: Ardabil
- County: Khalkhal
- District: Khvoresh Rostam
- Rural District: Khvoresh Rostam-e Jonubi

Population (2016)
  - Total: Below reporting threshold
- Time zone: UTC+3:30 (IRST)

Aqsu (Persian: اق سو) (Note: Also romanized as Āq Sū and Āqsū; also known as Yengeh Deh) is a village in Khvoresh Rostam-e Jonubi Rural District of Khvoresh Rostam District in Khalkhal County, Ardabil province, Iran.

== Demographics ==
=== Population ===
At the time of the 2006 National Census, the village's population was 32 in seven households. The following census in 2011 counted 18 people in five households. The 2016 census measured the population of the village as below the reporting threshold.
