= Deh Musa =

Deh Musa or Deh Moosa (Persian: ده موسي), also rendered as Deh Musi, may refer to:

- Deh Musa, Hamadan
- Deh Musa, Kermanshah
- Deh Musa, Sistan and Baluchestan
