= Leyli Yadegar =

Village in Hamadan province, Iran

Leyli Yadegar Persian: ليلي يادگار
- Village
- Location within Iran
- Coordinates: 34°17′10″N 48°12′38″E
- Country: Iran
- Province: Hamadan
- County: Nahavand
- District: Khezel
- Rural District: Solgi

Population (2016)
  - Total: 1,087
- Time zone: UTC+3:30 (IRST)

Leyli Yadegar (Persian: ليلي يادگار) (Note: Also romanized as Leylī Yādegār; also known as Laleh Yādegār) is a village in Solgi Rural District of Khezel District in Nahavand County, Hamadan province, Iran.

== Demographics ==
=== Population ===
At the time of the 2006 National Census, the village's population was 1,133 in 258 households. The following census in 2011 counted 1,145 people in 337 households. The 2016 census measured the population of the village as 1,087 people in 334 households.
