= Shamsabad, Khalkhal =

Village in Ardabil province, Iran

Shamsabad Persian: شمس اباد
- Village
- Location within Iran
- Coordinates: 37°24′25″N 48°13′38″E
- Country: Iran
- Province: Ardabil
- County: Khalkhal
- District: Khvoresh Rostam
- Rural District: Khvoresh Rostam-e Shomali

Population (2016)
  - Total: 108
- Time zone: UTC+3:30 (IRST)

Shamsabad (Persian: شمس اباد) (Note: Also romanized as Shamsābād) is a village in Khvoresh Rostam-e Shomali Rural District of Khvoresh Rostam District in Khalkhal County, Ardabil province, Iran.

== Demographics ==
=== Population ===
At the time of the 2006 National Census, the village's population was 156 in 57 households. The following census in 2011 counted 121 people in 57 households. The 2016 census measured the population of the village as 108 people in 46 households.
