= Kabudchi =

Village in Ardabil province, Iran

Kabudchi Persian: كبودچي
- Village
- Location within Iran
- Coordinates: 37°26′51″N 48°18′26″E
- Country: Iran
- Province: Ardabil
- County: Khalkhal
- District: Khvoresh Rostam
- Rural District: Khvoresh Rostam-e Shomali

Population (2016)
  - Total: 31
- Time zone: UTC+3:30 (IRST)

Kabudchi (Persian: كبودچي) (Note: Also romanized as Kabūdchī) is a village in Khvoresh Rostam-e Shomali Rural District of Khvoresh Rostam District in Khalkhal County, Ardabil province, Iran.

== Demographics ==
=== Population ===
At the time of the 2006 National Census, the village's population was 22 in five households. The following census in 2011 counted 27 people in eight households. The 2016 census measured the population of the village as 31 people in nine households.
