= Balajub =

Balajub or Bala Jub (Persian: بالاجوب) may refer to:

- Balajub, Hamadan
- Balajub, Kermanshah
