= Kahriz-e Salah ol Din =

Village in Hamadan province, Iran

Kahriz-e Salah ol Din Persian: كهريزصلاح الدين
- Village
- Location within Iran
- Coordinates: 34°19′13″N 48°10′43″E
- Country: Iran
- Province: Hamadan
- County: Nahavand
- District: Khezel
- Rural District: Khezel-e Sharqi

Population (2016)
  - Total: 846
- Time zone: UTC+3:30 (IRST)

Kahriz-e Salah ol Din (Persian: كهريزصلاح الدين) (Note: Also romanized as Kahrīz-e Şalāḩ ol Dīn; formerly known as Kahriz-e Safi Khani (کهریز صفی‌خانی); also known as Kahrīz, Kahrīz-e Şalāḩ od Dīn, and Kārīz) is a village in Khezel-e Sharqi Rural District of Khezel District in Nahavand County, Hamadan province, Iran.

== Demographics ==
=== Population ===
At the time of the 2006 National Census, the village's population was 1,033 in 263 households. The following census in 2011 counted 1,011 people in 294 households. The 2016 census measured the population of the village as 846 people in 257 households.
