= Kivi, Khalkhal =

Village in Ardabil province, Iran

Kivi Persian: كيوي
- Village
- Location within Iran
- Coordinates: 37°21′46″N 48°25′42″E
- Country: Iran
- Province: Ardabil
- County: Khalkhal
- District: Khvoresh Rostam
- Rural District: Khvoresh Rostam-e Shomali

Population (2016)
  - Total: 136
- Time zone: UTC+3:30 (IRST)

Kivi (Persian: كيوي) (Note: Also romanized as Kīvī; also known as Kīvī Zāvīyeh) is a village in Khvoresh Rostam-e Shomali Rural District of Khvoresh Rostam District in Khalkhal County, Ardabil province, Iran.

== Etymology ==
According to Vladimir Minorsky, the name "Kivi" is derived from the historical Tatar tribe called Kūyīn or Kü'īn.

== Demographics ==
=== Population ===
At the time of the 2006 National Census, the village's population was 190 in 54 households. The following census in 2011 counted 173 people in 55 households. The 2016 census measured the population of the village as 136 people in 48 households.
