= Shiravand, Hamadan =

Village in Hamadan province, Iran

Shiravand Persian: شيراوند
- Village
- Location within Iran
- Coordinates: 34°15′44″N 48°06′10″E
- Country: Iran
- Province: Hamadan
- County: Nahavand
- District: Khezel
- Rural District: Solgi

Population (2016)
  - Total: 980
- Time zone: UTC+3:30 (IRST)

Shiravand (Persian: شيراوند) (Note: Also romanized as Shīr Āvand and Shīrāvand; also known as Deh Now) is a village in Solgi Rural District of Khezel District in Nahavand County, Hamadan province, Iran.

== Demographics ==
=== Population ===
At the time of the 2006 National Census, the village's population was 996 in 252 households. The following census in 2011 counted 994 people in 293 households. The 2016 census measured the population of the village as 980 people in 298 households.
