= Nesaz =

Village in Ardabil province, Iran

Nesaz Persian: نساز
- Village
- Location within Iran
- Coordinates: 37°18′18″N 48°30′13″E
- Country: Iran
- Province: Ardabil
- County: Khalkhal
- District: Khvoresh Rostam
- Rural District: Khvoresh Rostam-e Jonubi

Population (2016)
  - Total: 641
- Time zone: UTC+3:30 (IRST)

Nesaz (Persian: نساز) (Note: Also romanized as Nesāz; also known as Nesār) is a village in Khvoresh Rostam-e Jonubi Rural District of Khvoresh Rostam District in Khalkhal County, Ardabil province, Iran.

== Demographics ==
=== Population ===
At the time of the 2006 National Census, the village's population was 921 in 215 households. The following census in 2011 counted 738 people in 213 households. The 2016 census measured the population of the village as 641 people in 195 households.
