= Band Aman =

Village in Hamadan province, Iran

Band Aman Persian: بندامان
- Village
- Location within Iran
- Coordinates: 34°13′24″N 48°13′43″E
- Country: Iran
- Province: Hamadan
- County: Nahavand
- District: Zarrin Dasht
- Rural District: Fazl

Population (2016)
  - Total: 166
- Time zone: UTC+3:30 (IRST)

Band Aman (Persian: بندامان) (Note: Also romanized as Band Amān; also known as Band Āmūn and Bandāmūn) is a village in Fazl Rural District of Zarrin Dasht District in Nahavand County, Hamadan province, Iran.

== Demographics ==
=== Population ===
At the time of the 2006 National Census, the village's population was 200 in 55 households. The following census in 2011 counted 140 people in 39 households. The 2016 census measured the population of the village as 166 people in 56 households.
