= Barandaq =

Village in Ardabil province, Iran

Barandaq Persian: برندق
- Village
- Location within Iran
- Coordinates: 37°14′51″N 48°34′11″E
- Country: Iran
- Province: Ardabil
- County: Khalkhal
- District: Khvoresh Rostam
- Rural District: Khvoresh Rostam-e Jonubi

Population (2016)
  - Total: 1,820
- Time zone: UTC+3:30 (IRST)

Barandaq (Persian: برندق) is a village in, and the capital of, Khvoresh Rostam-e Jonubi Rural District in Khvoresh Rostam District of Khalkhal County, Ardabil province, Iran.

== Demographics ==
=== Population ===
At the time of the 2006 National Census, the village's population was 1,488 in 381 households. The following census in 2011 counted 1,270 people in 396 households. The 2016 census measured the population of the village as 1,820 people in 580 households. It was the most populous village in its rural district.
