= Pishgaman =

Village in Ardabil province, Iran

Pishgaman Persian: پيشگمان
- Village
- Location within Iran
- Coordinates: 37°15′32″N 48°30′35″E
- Country: Iran
- Province: Ardabil
- County: Khalkhal
- District: Khvoresh Rostam
- Rural District: Khvoresh Rostam-e Jonubi

Population (2016)
  - Total: 48
- Time zone: UTC+3:30 (IRST)

Pishgaman (Persian: پيشگمان) (Note: Also romanized as Pīshgamān; also known as Pamish, Pāynīsh, and Peshgomān) is a village in Khvoresh Rostam-e Jonubi Rural District of Khvoresh Rostam District in Khalkhal County, Ardabil province, Iran.

== Demographics ==
=== Population ===
At the time of the 2006 National Census, the village's population was 55 in 11 households. The following census in 2011 counted 65 people in 13 households. The 2016 census measured the population of the village as 48 people in 14 households.
