= Cheshmeh Mahi =

Cheshmeh Mahi or Chashmeh Mahi (Persian: چشمه ماهي) may refer to:

- Cheshmeh Mahi, Hamadan
- Cheshmeh Mahi, Ilam
- Cheshmeh Mahi, Razavi Khorasan
