= Damdol =

Village in Ardabil province, Iran

Damdol Persian: دمدل
- Village
- Location within Iran
- Coordinates: 37°20′14″N 48°24′10″E
- Country: Iran
- Province: Ardabil
- County: Khalkhal
- District: Khvoresh Rostam
- Rural District: Khvoresh Rostam-e Shomali

Population (2016)
  - Total: 147
- Time zone: UTC+3:30 (IRST)

Damdol (Persian: دمدل) (Note: Also known as Dam Dūl) is a village in Khvoresh Rostam-e Shomali Rural District of Khvoresh Rostam District in Khalkhal County, Ardabil province, Iran.

== Demographics ==
=== Population ===
At the time of the 2006 National Census, the village's population was 187 in 58 households. The 2011 census counted 158 people in 54 households. The 2016 census recorded the village's population as 147 people in 48 households.
