= Barreh Farakh =

Barreh Farakh بره فراخ
- Village
- Location within Iran
- Coordinates: 34°23′08″N 48°05′11″E
- Country: Iran
- Province: Hamadan
- County: Nahavand
- Bakhsh: Khezel
- Rural District: Khezel-e Sharqi

Population (2006)
  - Total: 410
- Time zone: UTC+3:30 (IRST)
  - Summer (DST): UTC+4:30 (IRDT)

Barreh Farakh (Persian: بره فراخ, also Romanized as Barreh Farākh, Barah Farākh, and Bareh Farākh; also known as Barāfaraq and Barafra) is a village in Khezel-e Sharqi Rural District, Khezel District, Nahavand County, Hamadan Province, Iran. At the 2006 census, its population was 410, in 89 families.
