= Deh Now-e Abd ol Maleki =

Village in Hamadan province, Iran

Deh Now-e Abd ol Maleki Persian: دهنوعبدالملكي
- Village
- Location within Iran
- Coordinates: 34°22′23″N 48°09′22″E
- Country: Iran
- Province: Hamadan
- County: Nahavand
- District: Khezel
- Rural District: Khezel-e Sharqi

Population (2016)
  - Total: 776
- Time zone: UTC+3:30 (IRST)

Deh Now-e Abd ol Maleki (Persian: دهنوعبدالملكي) (Note: Also romanized as Deh Now-e ‘Abd ol Malekī and Dehnow-e ‘Abdol Malakī; also known as Damū’eh, Deh Nau, Dehnow, and Demoa) is a village in Khezel-e Sharqi Rural District of Khezel District in Nahavand County, Hamadan province, Iran.

== Demographics ==
=== Population ===
At the time of the 2006 National Census, the village's population was 933 in 231 households. The following census in 2011 counted 658 people in 197 households. The 2016 census measured the population of the village as 776 people in 228 households.
