= Dayu Kandi =

Village in Ardabil province, Iran

Dayu Kandi Persian: دايوكندي
- Village
- Location within Iran
- Coordinates: 37°21′48″N 48°16′07″E
- Country: Iran
- Province: Ardabil
- County: Khalkhal
- District: Khvoresh Rostam
- Rural District: Khvoresh Rostam-e Shomali

Population (2016)
  - Total: 41
- Time zone: UTC+3:30 (IRST)

Dayu Kandi (Persian: دايوكندي) (Note: Also romanized as Dāyū Kandī; also known as Dāyū, Tai, and Tay) is a village in Khvoresh Rostam-e Shomali Rural District of Khvoresh Rostam District in Khalkhal County, Ardabil province, Iran.

== Demographics ==
=== Population ===
At the time of the 2006 National Census, the village's population was 78 in 24 households. The following census in 2011 counted 54 people in 21 households. The 2016 census measured the population of the village as 41 people in 17 households.
