= Golujeh, Khvoresh Rostam =

Village in Ardabil province, Iran

Golujeh Persian: گلوجه
- Village
- Location within Iran
- Coordinates: 37°16′28″N 48°27′13″E
- Country: Iran
- Province: Ardabil
- County: Khalkhal
- District: Khvoresh Rostam
- Rural District: Khvoresh Rostam-e Jonubi

Population (2016)
  - Total: 27
- Time zone: UTC+3:30 (IRST)

Golujeh (Persian: گلوجه) (Note: Also romanized as Golūjeh; also known as Golijeh) is a village in Khvoresh Rostam-e Jonubi Rural District of Khvoresh Rostam District in Khalkhal County, Ardabil province, Iran.

== Demographics ==
=== Population ===
At the time of the 2006 National Census, the village's population was 56 in 12 households. The following census in 2011 counted 35 people in eight households. The 2016 census measured the population of the village as 27 people in seven households.
