= Kahriz-e Salim =

Village in Hamadan province, Iran

Kahriz-e Salim Persian: كهريزسليم
- Village
- Location within Iran
- Coordinates: 34°19′41″N 48°09′45″E
- Country: Iran
- Province: Hamadan
- County: Nahavand
- District: Khezel
- Rural District: Khezel-e Sharqi

Population (2016)
  - Total: 720
- Time zone: UTC+3:30 (IRST)

Kahriz-e Salim (Persian: كهريزسليم) (Note: Also romanized as Kahrīz Salīm and Kahrīz-e Salīm; also known as Kārīz) is a village in Khezel-e Sharqi Rural District of Khezel District in Nahavand County, Hamadan province, Iran.

== Demographics ==
=== Population ===
At the time of the 2006 National Census, the village's population was 786 in 194 households. The following census in 2011 counted 676 people in 231 households. The 2016 census measured the population of the village as 720 people in 227 households.
