= Nemahil =

Village in Ardabil province, Iran

Nemahil Persian: نمهيل
- Village
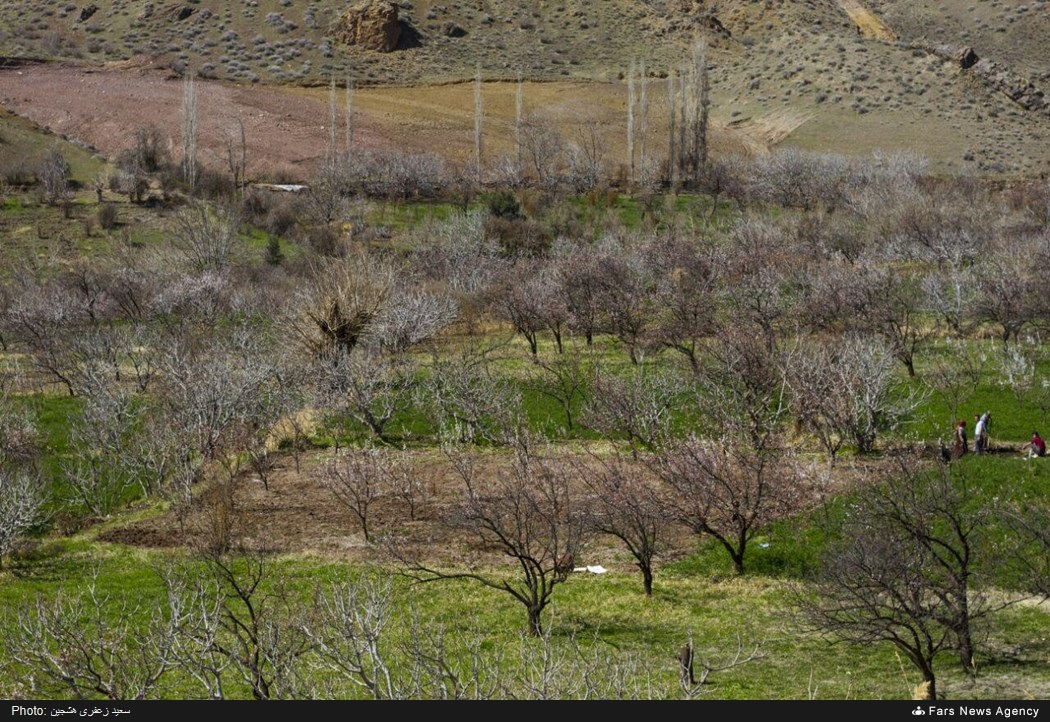
- Nemahil village in Khalkhal County

- Location within Iran
- Coordinates: 37°15′07″N 48°25′04″E
- Country: Iran
- Province: Ardabil
- County: Khalkhal
- District: Khvoresh Rostam
- Rural District: Khvoresh Rostam-e Jonubi

Population (2016)
  - Total: 810
- Time zone: UTC+3:30 (IRST)

Nemahil (Persian: نمهيل) (Note: Also romanized as Nemahīl; also known as Kamhīl, Nemhel, Neymhel, Nimāhil, Nīmeh Ḩīl, Nīmeh Hīl, Nīmhel, and Nimiil)) is a village in Khvoresh Rostam-e Jonubi Rural District of Khvoresh Rostam District in Khalkhal County, Ardabil province, Iran.

== Demographics ==
=== Population ===
At the time of the 2006 National Census, the village's population was 791 in 186 households. The following census in 2011 counted 779 people in 204 households. The 2016 census measured the population of the village as 810 people in 238 households.
