= Zaviyeh-ye Jafarabad =

Village in Ardabil province, Iran

Zaviyeh-ye Jafarabad Persian: زاويه جعفراباد
- Village
- Location within Iran
- Coordinates: 37°11′18″N 48°40′21″E
- Country: Iran
- Province: Ardabil
- County: Khalkhal
- District: Khvoresh Rostam
- Rural District: Khvoresh Rostam-e Jonubi

Population (2016)
  - Total: 129
- Time zone: UTC+3:30 (IRST)

Zaviyeh-ye Jafarabad (Persian: زاويه جعفراباد) (Note: Also romanized as Zāvīyeh-ye Ja‘farābād; also known as Zāvīyeh) is a village in Khvoresh Rostam-e Jonubi Rural District of Khvoresh Rostam District in Khalkhal County, Ardabil province, Iran.

== Demographics ==
=== Population ===
At the time of the 2006 National Census, the village's population was 210 in 45 households. The following census in 2011 counted 121 people in 33 households. The 2016 census measured the population of the village as 129 people in 39 households.
