= Seqizchi =

Village in Ardabil province, Iran

Seqizchi Persian: سقيزچي
- Village
- Location within Iran
- Coordinates: 37°23′59″N 48°25′23″E
- Country: Iran
- Province: Ardabil
- County: Khalkhal
- District: Khvoresh Rostam
- Rural District: Khvoresh Rostam-e Shomali

Population (2016)
  - Total: Below reporting threshold
- Time zone: UTC+3:30 (IRST)

Seqizchi (Persian: سقيزچي) (Note: Also romanized as Seqīzchī; also known as Chahār Khānevār and Seqarchī) is a village in Khvoresh Rostam-e Shomali Rural District of Khvoresh Rostam District in Khalkhal County, Ardabil province, Iran.

== Demographics ==
=== Population ===
At the time of the 2006 National Census, the village's population was 13 in four households. The following census in 2011 counted 14 people in four households. The 2016 census measured the population of the village as below the reporting threshold.
