= Firuzabad-e Sofla =

Village in Hamadan province, Iran

Firuzabad-e Sofla Persian: فيروزاباد سفلي
- Village
- Location within Iran
- Coordinates: 34°20′48″N 48°05′46″E
- Country: Iran
- Province: Hamadan
- County: Nahavand
- District: Khezel
- Rural District: Khezel-e Sharqi

Population (2016)
  - Total: 225
- Time zone: UTC+3:30 (IRST)

Firuzabad-e Sofla (Persian: فيروزابادسفلي) (Note: Also romanized as Fīrūzābād-e Soflá; also known as Fīrūzābād Pā’īn and Fīrūzābād-e Pā’īn) is a village in Khezel-e Sharqi Rural District of Khezel District in Nahavand County, Hamadan province, Iran.

== Demographics ==
=== Population ===
At the time of the 2006 National Census, the village's population was 262 in 66 households. The following census in 2011 counted 214 people in 63 households. The 2016 census measured the population of the village as 225 people in 68 households.
