= Kargazlu =

Village in Ardabil province, Iran

Kargazlu Persian: كرگزلو
- Village
- Location within Iran
- Coordinates: 37°24′02″N 48°27′49″E
- Country: Iran
- Province: Ardabil
- County: Khalkhal
- District: Khvoresh Rostam
- Rural District: Khvoresh Rostam-e Shomali

Population (2016)
  - Total: 23
- Time zone: UTC+3:30 (IRST)

Kargazlu (Persian: كرگزلو) (Note: Also romanized as Kargazlū and Kargezlū; also known as Gergazu and Karkazlū) is a village in Khvoresh Rostam-e Shomali Rural District of Khvoresh Rostam District in Khalkhal County, Ardabil province, Iran.

== Demographics ==
=== Population ===
At the time of the 2006 National Census, the village's population was 46 in 21 households. The following census in 2011 counted 36 people in 13 households. The 2016 census measured the population of the village as 23 people in seven households.
