= Kamar, Iran =

Village in Ardabil province, Iran

Kamar Persian: كمر
- Village
- Location within Iran
- Coordinates: 37°17′53″N 48°17′43″E
- Country: Iran
- Province: Ardabil
- County: Khalkhal
- District: Khvoresh Rostam
- Rural District: Khvoresh Rostam-e Shomali

Population (2016)
  - Total: 95
- Time zone: UTC+3:30 (IRST)

Kamar (Persian: كمر) is a village in Khvoresh Rostam-e Shomali Rural District of Khvoresh Rostam District in Khalkhal County, Ardabil province, Iran.

== Demographics ==
=== Population ===
At the time of the 2006 National Census, the village's population was 138 in 34 households. The following census in 2011 counted 109 people in 28 households. The 2016 census measured the population of the village as 95 people in 28 households.
