= Sar Duran =

Village in Hamadan province, Iran

Sar Duran Persian: سردوران
- Village
- Location within Iran
- Coordinates: 34°12′11″N 48°15′51″E
- Country: Iran
- Province: Hamadan
- County: Nahavand
- District: Zarrin Dasht
- Rural District: Fazl

Population (2016)
  - Total: 243
- Time zone: UTC+3:30 (IRST)

Sar Duran (Persian: سردوران) (Note: Also romanized as Sar Dūrān; also known as Sar Darūn and Savdarūn) is a village in Fazl Rural District of Zarrin Dasht District in Nahavand County, Hamadan province, Iran.

== Demographics ==
=== Population ===
At the time of the 2006 National Census, the village's population was 349 in 88 households. The following census in 2011 counted 273 people in 80 households. The 2016 census measured the population of the village as 243 people in 84 households.
