= Dustli =

Village in Ardabil province, Iran

Dustli Persian: دوستلي
- Village
- Location within Iran
- Coordinates: 37°27′31″N 48°23′08″E
- Country: Iran
- Province: Ardabil
- County: Khalkhal
- District: Khvoresh Rostam
- Rural District: Khvoresh Rostam-e Shomali

Population (2016)
  - Total: 16
- Time zone: UTC+3:30 (IRST)

Dustli (Persian: دوستلي) (Note: Also romanized as Dūstī) is a village in Khvoresh Rostam-e Shomali Rural District of Khvoresh Rostam District in Khalkhal County, Ardabil province, Iran.

== Demographics ==
=== Population ===
The village did not appear in the 2006 National Census. The following census in 2011 counted 21 people in 11 households. The 2016 census measured the population of the village as 16 people in four households.
