= Gelgelab =

Gelgelab or Golgolab (Persian: گل گلاب) may refer to:

- Gelgelab, Ardabil
- Golgolab, East Azerbaijan
