= Tavaneh =

Village in Hamadan province, Iran

Tavaneh Persian: توانه
- Village
- Location within Iran
- Coordinates: 34°12′43″N 48°11′09″E
- Country: Iran
- Province: Hamadan
- County: Nahavand
- District: Zarrin Dasht
- Rural District: Garin

Population (2016)
  - Total: 2,397
- Time zone: UTC+3:30 (IRST)

Tavaneh (Persian: توانه) (Note: Also romanized as Tavāneh) is a village in, and the capital of, Garin Rural District in Zarrin Dasht District of Nahavand County, Hamadan province, Iran.

== Demographics ==
=== Population ===
At the time of the 2006 National Census, the village's population was 2,992 in 746 households. The following census in 2011 counted 2,673 people in 751 households. The 2016 census measured the population of the village as 2,397 people in 721 households, the most populous in its rural district.
