= Khush Nameh =

Village in Ardabil province, Iran

Khush Nameh Persian: خوشنامه
- Village
- Location within Iran
- Coordinates: 37°28′43″N 48°20′56″E
- Country: Iran
- Province: Ardabil
- County: Khalkhal
- District: Khvoresh Rostam
- Rural District: Khvoresh Rostam-e Shomali

Population (2016)
  - Total: 61
- Time zone: UTC+3:30 (IRST)

Khush Nameh (Persian: خوشنامه) (Note: Also romanized as Khūsh Nāmeh and Khvoshnāmeh; also known as Khoshnama) is a village in Khvoresh Rostam-e Shomali Rural District of Khvoresh Rostam District in Khalkhal County, Ardabil province, Iran.

== Demographics ==
=== Population ===
At the time of the 2006 National Census, the village's population was 68 in 15 households. The following census in 2011 counted 49 people in 14 households. The 2016 census measured the population of the village as 61 people in 17 households.
