= Sejahrud =

Village in Ardabil province, Iran

Sejahrud Persian: سجهرود
- Village
- Location within Iran
- Coordinates: 37°10′32″N 48°34′56″E
- Country: Iran
- Province: Ardabil
- County: Khalkhal
- District: Khvoresh Rostam
- Rural District: Khvoresh Rostam-e Jonubi

Population (2016)
  - Total: 156
- Time zone: UTC+3:30 (IRST)

Sejahrud (Persian: سجهرود) (Note: Also romanized as Sejahrūd; also known as Sakhrūd) is a village in Khvoresh Rostam-e Jonubi Rural District of Khvoresh Rostam District in Khalkhal County, Ardabil province, Iran.

== Demographics ==
=== Population ===
At the time of the 2006 National Census, the village's population was 418 in 104 households. The following census in 2011 counted 323 people in 91 households. The 2016 census measured the population of the village as 256 people in 89 households.
