= Ardabilya =

Ardabilya may refer to:

- Ərdəbilə, Azerbaijan
- Ardabilya, Iran
