= Mirahjin =

Village in Ardabil province, Iran

Mirahjin Persian: ميره جين
- Village
- Location within Iran
- Coordinates: 37°23′20″N 48°30′26″E
- Country: Iran
- Province: Ardabil
- County: Khalkhal
- District: Khvoresh Rostam
- Rural District: Khvoresh Rostam-e Shomali

Population (2016)
  - Total: 93
- Time zone: UTC+3:30 (IRST)

Mirahjin (Persian: ميره جين) (Note: Also romanized as Mīrahjīn; also known as Mīrājīn) is a village in Khvoresh Rostam-e Shomali Rural District of Khvoresh Rostam District in Khalkhal County, Ardabil province, Iran.

== Demographics ==
=== Population ===
At the time of the 2006 National Census, the village's population was 176 in 44 households. The following census in 2011 counted 109 people in 37 households. The 2016 census measured the population of the village as 93 people in 31 households.
