= Chenar, Khalkhal =

Village in Ardabil province, Iran

Chenar Persian: چنار
- Village
- Location within Iran
- Coordinates: 37°27′07″N 48°21′16″E
- Country: Iran
- Province: Ardabil
- County: Khalkhal
- District: Khvoresh Rostam
- Rural District: Khvoresh Rostam-e Shomali

Population (2016)
  - Total: 38
- Time zone: UTC+3:30 (IRST)

Chenar (Persian: چنار) (Note: Also romanized as Chenār; also known as Chenārān and Chinar) is a village in Khvoresh Rostam-e Shomali Rural District of Khvoresh Rostam District in Khalkhal County, Ardabil province, Iran.

== Demographics ==
=== Population ===
At the time of the 2006 National Census, the village's population was 82 in 18 households. The following census in 2011 counted 32 people in 20 households. The 2016 census measured the population of the village as 38 people in 11 households.
