= Gonbad-e Kabud =

Village in Hamadan province, Iran

Gonbad-e Kabud Persian: گنبدكبود
- Village
- Location within Iran
- Coordinates: 34°13′01″N 48°08′55″E
- Country: Iran
- Province: Hamadan
- County: Nahavand
- District: Zarrin Dasht
- Rural District: Garin

Population (2016)
  - Total: 1,968
- Time zone: UTC+3:30 (IRST)

Gonbad-e Kabud (Persian: گنبدكبود) (Note: Also romanized as Gonbad Kabūd and Gonbad-e Kabūd) is a village in Garin Rural District of Zarrin Dasht District in Nahavand County, Hamadan province, Iran.

== Demographics ==
=== Population ===
At the time of the 2006 National Census, the village's population was 1,676 in 421 households. The following census in 2011 counted 1,937 people in 570 households. The 2016 census measured the population of the village as 1,968 people in 578 households.
