= Cheshmeh Mahi, Hamadan =

Cheshmeh Mahi چشمه ماهي
- Village
- Location within Iran
- Coordinates: 34°20′19″N 48°02′06″E
- Country: Iran
- Province: Hamadan
- County: Nahavand
- Bakhsh: Khezel
- Rural District: Khezel-e Sharqi

Population (2006)
  - Total: 402
- Time zone: UTC+3:30 (IRST)
  - Summer (DST): UTC+4:30 (IRDT)

Cheshmeh Mahi (Persian: چشمه ماهي, also Romanized as Cheshmeh Māhī and Chashmeh Māhī) is a village in Khezel-e Sharqi Rural District, Khezel District, Nahavand County, Hamadan Province, Iran. At the 2006 census, its population was 402, in 79 families.
