= Karnaq =

Village in Ardabil province, Iran

Karnaq Persian: كرنق
- Village
- Location within Iran
- Coordinates: 37°15′59″N 48°37′02″E
- Country: Iran
- Province: Ardabil
- County: Khalkhal
- District: Khvoresh Rostam
- Rural District: Khvoresh Rostam-e Jonubi

Population (2016)
  - Total: 134
- Time zone: UTC+3:30 (IRST)

Karnaq (Persian: كرنق) (Note: Also known as Karneh and Kizmya) is a village in Khvoresh Rostam-e Jonubi Rural District of Khvoresh Rostam District in Khalkhal County, Ardabil province, Iran.

== Demographics ==
=== Population ===
At the time of the 2006 National Census, the village's population was 216 in 38 households. The following census in 2011 counted 177 people in 44 households. The 2016 census measured the population of the village as 134 people in 37 households.
