= Vanan, Ardabil =

Village in Ardabil province, Iran

Vanan Persian: ونن
- Village
- Location within Iran
- Coordinates: 37°24′51″N 48°25′46″E
- Country: Iran
- Province: Ardabil
- County: Khalkhal
- District: Khvoresh Rostam
- Rural District: Khvoresh Rostam-e Shomali

Population (2016)
  - Total: 31
- Time zone: UTC+3:30 (IRST)

Vanan (Persian: ونن) (Note: Also romanized as Venen) is a village in Khvoresh Rostam-e Shomali Rural District of Khvoresh Rostam District in Khalkhal County, Ardabil province, Iran.

== Demographics ==
=== Population ===
At the time of the 2006 National Census, the village's population was 18 in six households. The following census in 2011 counted 20 people in nine households. The 2016 census measured the population of the village as 31 people in nine households.
