= Rudbari, Iran =

Village in Hamadan province, Iran

Rudbari Persian: رودباري
- Village
- Location within Iran
- Coordinates: 34°17′41″N 48°07′51″E
- Country: Iran
- Province: Hamadan
- County: Nahavand
- District: Khezel
- Rural District: Solgi

Population (2016)
  - Total: 666
- Time zone: UTC+3:30 (IRST)

Rudbari (Persian: رودباري) (Note: Also romanized as Rūdbārī) is a village in Solgi Rural District of Khezel District in Nahavand County, Hamadan province, Iran.

== Demographics ==
=== Population ===
At the time of the 2006 National Census, the village's population was 796 in 179 households. The following census in 2011 counted 711 people in 211 households. The 2016 census measured the population of the village as 666 people in 212 households.
