= Viu, Iran =

Village in Ardabil province, Iran

Viu Persian: ويو
- Village
- Location within Iran
- Coordinates: 37°19′27″N 48°28′18″E
- Country: Iran
- Province: Ardabil
- County: Khalkhal
- District: Khvoresh Rostam
- Rural District: Khvoresh Rostam-e Jonubi

Population (2016)
  - Total: 36
- Time zone: UTC+3:30 (IRST)

Viu (Persian: ويو) (Note: Also romanized as Vīū and Vīv) is a village in Khvoresh Rostam-e Jonubi Rural District of Khvoresh Rostam District in Khalkhal County, Ardabil province, Iran.

== Demographics ==
=== Population ===
At the time of the 2006 National Census, the village's population was 65 in 20 households. The following census in 2011 counted 41 people in 15 households. The 2016 census measured the population of the village as 36 people in 12 households.
