= Gelgelab, Ardabil =

Village in Ardabil province, Iran

Gelgelab Persian: گل گلاب
- Village
- Location within Iran
- Coordinates: 37°19′38″N 48°21′19″E
- Country: Iran
- Province: Ardabil
- County: Khalkhal
- District: Khvoresh Rostam
- Rural District: Khvoresh Rostam-e Shomali

Population (2016)
  - Total: 65
- Time zone: UTC+3:30 (IRST)

Gelgelab (Persian: گل گلاب) (Note: Also romanized as Gelgelāb; also known as Kal Kalāb) is a village in Khvoresh Rostam-e Shomali Rural District of Khvoresh Rostam District in Khalkhal County, Ardabil province, Iran.

== Demographics ==
=== Population ===
At the time of the 2006 National Census, the village's population was 81 in 24 households. The following census in 2011 counted 65 people in 21 households. The 2016 census measured the population of the village as 65 people in 21 households.
