= Zaramin-e Sofla =

Village in Hamadan province, Iran

Zaramin-e Sofla Persian: زرامين سفلي
- Village
- Location within Iran
- Coordinates: 34°11′36″N 48°18′01″E
- Country: Iran
- Province: Hamadan
- County: Nahavand
- District: Zarrin Dasht
- Rural District: Fazl

Population (2016)
  - Total: 1,403
- Time zone: UTC+3:30 (IRST)

Zaramin-e Sofla (Persian: زرامين سفلي) (Note: Also romanized as Zaramin Sofla and Zarāmīn-e Soflá; also known as Zaramin and Zarāmīn-e Pā’īn) is a village in Fazl Rural District of Zarrin Dasht District in Nahavand County, Hamadan province, Iran.

== Demographics ==
=== Population ===
At the time of the 2006 National Census, the village's population was 1,625 in 428 households. The following census in 2011 counted 1,554 people in 475 households. The 2016 census measured the population of the village as 1,403 people in 471 households, the most populous in its rural district.
