= Sharifabad, Hamadan =

Village in Hamadan province, Iran

Sharifabad Persian: شريف اباد
- Village
- Location within Iran
- Coordinates: 34°18′32″N 48°06′10″E
- Country: Iran
- Province: Hamadan
- County: Nahavand
- District: Khezel
- Rural District: Khezel-e Sharqi

Population (2016)
  - Total: 667
- Time zone: UTC+3:30 (IRST)

Sharifabad (Persian: شريف اباد) (Note: Also romanized as Sharīfābād; also known as Saritābād) is a village in Khezel-e Sharqi Rural District of Khezel District in Nahavand County, Hamadan province, Iran.

== Demographics ==
=== Population ===
At the time of the 2006 National Census, the village's population was 701 in 173 households. The following census in 2011 counted 714 people in 223 households. The 2016 census measured the population of the village as 667 people in 210 households.
