= Kazaj =

Village in Ardabil province, Iran

Kazaj Persian: كزج
- Village
- Location within Iran
- Coordinates: 37°24′28″N 48°16′00″E
- Country: Iran
- Province: Ardabil
- County: Khalkhal
- District: Khvoresh Rostam
- Rural District: Khvoresh Rostam-e Shomali

Population (2016)
  - Total: 820
- Time zone: UTC+3:30 (IRST)

Kazaj Village

Kazaj (Persian: كزج) (Note: Also romanized as Kazej; also known as Karaj) is a village in Khvoresh Rostam-e Shomali Rural District of Khvoresh Rostam District in Khalkhal County, Ardabil province, Iran.

== Demographics ==
=== Population ===
At the time of the 2006 National Census, the village's population was 1,047 in 278 households. The following census in 2011 counted 799 people in 259 households. The 2016 census measured the population of the village as 820 people in 286 households. It was the most populous village in its rural district.
