= Zarrin Dasht =

Zarrin Dasht (Persian: زرین‌دشت) may refer to:

- Zarrin Dasht County, Fars province, Iran
- Zarrin Dasht District, Hamadan province, Iran
- Zarrin Dasht Rural District, Ilam province, Iran
