= Kavan =

Kavan may refer to:

- Kavan, Iran or Gavan, Ardabil, a village in Ardabil Province, Iran
- Kavan (film), a 2017 Indian Tamil-language film
- Anna Kavan, an English novelist
- Kavan Gayle, a Jamaican politician
- Jan Kavan, Czech politician
- František Kaván, Czech painter and poet
- Teagan Kavan, American softball pitcher

== See also ==
- Gavan (disambiguation)
