= Qarah Takan =

Qarah Takan or Qarah Tekan or Qareh Tekan (Persian: قره تكان) may refer to:

- Qareh Tekan, Ardabil
- Qarah Takan, Razavi Khorasan
- Qarah Tikan, a village in Razavi Khorasan Province
