= Razeni =

Razeni may refer to:

- Răzeni, Moldova
- Razeni, Iran
