= Hashjin =

City in Ardabil province, Iran

Hashjin Persian: هشجين
- City
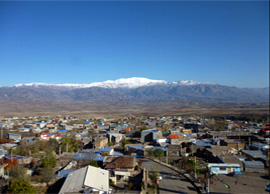
- The city of Hashjin

- Location within Iran
- Coordinates: 37°22′10″N 48°19′23″E
- Country: Iran
- Province: Ardabil
- County: Khalkhal
- District: Khvoresh Rostam

Population (2016)
  - Total: 5,725
- Time zone: UTC+3:30 (IRST)
- Website: agdag.ir

Hashjin (Persian: هشجين (Note: Also romanized as Heshajeyn and Heshajīn; also known as Heshīīn, Hīshen, Shain, and Shein) is a city in, and the capital of, Khvoresh Rostam District in Khalkhal County, Ardabil province, Iran. It also serves as the administrative center for Khvoresh Rostam-e Shomali Rural District. It is located east of the Qizil Üzan river, in the Alborz (Elburz) mountain range. Sheikh Hekmatollah Ramezani is the imam of Sheikh Mohammad Ghoreyshi mosque.

== Language ==
The native language of the people of Hashjin — part of Khvoresh Rostam District in Ardabil Province — is Azerbaijani Turkic (Azeri).

== Demographics ==
=== Population ===
At the time of the 2006 National Census, the city's population was 4,518 in 1,199 households. The following census in 2011 counted 4,578 people in 1,309 households. The 2016 census measured the population of the city as 5,725 people in 1,775 households.

== See also ==
Media related to Hashjin at Wikimedia Commons
