= Fazl Rural District =

Fazl Rural District (Persian: دهستان فضل) may refer to:

- Fazl Rural District (Hamadan Province)
- Fazl Rural District (Razavi Khorasan Province)
