= Ardabilaq =

Village in Ardabil province, Iran

Ardabilaq Persian: اردبيلق
- Village
- Location within Iran
- Coordinates: 37°25′37″N 48°19′17″E
- Country: Iran
- Province: Ardabil
- County: Khalkhal
- District: Khvoresh Rostam
- Rural District: Khvoresh Rostam-e Shomali

Population (2016)
  - Total: Below reporting threshold
- Time zone: UTC+3:30 (IRST)

Ardabilaq (Persian: اردبيلق) (Note: Also romanized as Ardabīlaq; also known as Ardabilya) is a village in Khvoresh Rostam-e Shomali Rural District of Khvoresh Rostam District in Khalkhal County, Ardabil province, Iran. It is located in the Alborz (Elburz) mountain range.

== Demographics ==
=== Population ===
At the time of the 2006 National Census, the village's population was 33 in 10 households. The following census in 2011 counted 18 people in six households. The 2016 census measured the population of the village as below the reporting threshold.
