= Vanan =

Vanan (Persian: وانان or ونان) may refer to:

- Vanan, Ardabil (ونان - Vanān)
- Vanan, Chaharmahal and Bakhtiari (وانان - Vānān)
- Vanan, Qom (ونان - Vanān)
- Vanån, river in Sweden
