= Karneh =

Karneh (Persian: كرنه) may refer to:

- Karneh, Ardabil
- Karneh, Zanjan
