= Doruneh =

Doruneh or Darooneh or Daruneh (Persian: درونه) may refer to:

- Daruneh, Hamadan
- Doruneh Rural District, in Razavi Khorasan Province
