= Abd ol Maleki, Hamadan =

Village in Hamadan province, Iran

Abd ol Maleki Persian: عبدالملكي
- Village
- Location within Iran
- Coordinates: 34°22′44″N 48°07′41″E
- Country: Iran
- Province: Hamadan
- County: Nahavand
- District: Khezel
- Rural District: Khezel-e Sharqi

Population (2016)
  - Total: 1,025
- Time zone: UTC+3:30 (IRST)

Abd ol Maleki (Persian: عبدالملكي) (Note: Also romanized as ‘Abd ol Malekī) is a village in Khezel-e Sharqi Rural District of Khezel District in Nahavand County, Hamadan province, Iran.

== Demographics ==
=== Population ===
At the time of the 2006 National Census, the village's population was 1,021 in 236 households. The following census in 2011 counted 643 people in 201 households. The 2016 census measured the population of the village as 1,025 people in 334 households, the most populous in its rural district.
