= Qareh Tekan, Ardabil =

Village in Ardabil province, Iran

Qareh Tekan Persian: قره تكان
- Village
- Location within Iran
- Coordinates: 37°23′32″N 48°25′23″E
- Country: Iran
- Province: Ardabil
- County: Khalkhal
- District: Khvoresh Rostam
- Rural District: Khvoresh Rostam-e Shomali

Population (2016)
  - Total: 65
- Time zone: UTC+3:30 (IRST)

Qareh Tekan (Persian: قره تكان) (Note: Also romanized as Qareh Tekān; also known as Karatkyan and Qaratkian) is a village in Khvoresh Rostam-e Shomali Rural District of Khvoresh Rostam District in Khalkhal County, Ardabil province, Iran.

== Demographics ==
=== Population ===
At the time of the 2006 National Census, the village's population was 78 in 21 households. The following census in 2011 counted 70 people in 22 households. The 2016 census measured the population of the village as 65 people in 21 households.
