= Razini =

Village in Hamadan province, Iran

Razini Persian: رزيني
- Village
- Location within Iran
- Coordinates: 34°16′01″N 48°07′37″E
- Country: Iran
- Province: Hamadan
- County: Nahavand
- District: Khezel
- Rural District: Solgi

Population (2016)
  - Total: 3,118
- Time zone: UTC+3:30 (IRST)

Razini (Persian: رزيني) (Note: Also romanized as Razīnī; also known as Razenī) is a village in Solgi Rural District of Khezel District in Nahavand County, Hamadan province, Iran.

== Demographics ==
=== Population ===
At the time of the 2006 National Census, the village's population was 3,294 in 806 households. The following census in 2011 counted 3,270 people in 945 households. The 2016 census measured the population of the village as 3,118 people in 970 households, the most populous in its rural district.
