= Zaramin-e Olya =

Village in Hamadan province, Iran

Zaramin-e Olya Persian: زرامين عليا
- Village
- Location within Iran
- Coordinates: 34°11′05″N 48°19′03″E
- Country: Iran
- Province: Hamadan
- County: Nahavand
- District: Zarrin Dasht
- Rural District: Fazl

Population (2016)
  - Total: 615
- Time zone: UTC+3:30 (IRST)

Zaramin-e Olya (Persian: زرامين عليا) (Note: Also romanized as Zarāmīn-e ‘Olyā; also known as Zarāmīn, Zarāmīn-e Bālā, and Zarrāmīn-e Bālā) is a village in Fazl Rural District of Zarrin Dasht District in Nahavand County, Hamadan province, Iran.

== Demographics ==
=== Population ===
At the time of the 2006 National Census, the village's population was 573 in 135 households. The following census in 2011 counted 598 people in 153 households. The 2016 census measured the population of the village as 615 people in 183 households.
