= Deh Musa, Hamadan =

Village in Hamadan province, Iran

Deh Musa Persian: ده موسي
- Village
- Location within Iran
- Coordinates: 34°24′27″N 48°09′47″E
- Country: Iran
- Province: Hamadan
- County: Nahavand
- District: Khezel
- Rural District: Khezel-e Sharqi

Population (2016)
  - Total: 860
- Time zone: UTC+3:30 (IRST)

Deh Musa (Persian: ده موسي) (Note: Also romanized as Deh Moosa, Deh Mūsá, and Deh Mūsī; also known as Temūsa and Tīmūsi) is a village in Khezel-e Sharqi Rural District of Khezel District in Nahavand County, Hamadan province, Iran.

== Demographics ==
=== Population ===
At the time of the 2006 National Census, the village's population was 874 in 183 households. The following census in 2011 counted 871 people in 220 households. The 2016 census measured the population of the village as 860 people in 247 households.
