= Doraneh =

Village in Hamadan province, Iran

Doraneh Persian: درانه
- Village
- Location within Iran
- Coordinates: 34°13′53″N 48°13′10″E
- Country: Iran
- Province: Hamadan
- County: Nahavand
- District: Zarrin Dasht
- Rural District: Fazl

Population (2016)
  - Total: 228
- Time zone: UTC+3:30 (IRST)

Doraneh (Persian: درانه) (Note: Also romanized as Dorāneh; also known as Darneh, Darowneh, Darūneh, and Dowrāneh) is a village in Fazl Rural District of Zarrin Dasht District in Nahavand County, Hamadan province, Iran.

== Demographics ==
=== Population ===
At the time of the 2006 National Census, the village's population was 205 in 54 households. The following census in 2011 counted 195 people in 59 households. The 2016 census measured the population of the village as 228 people in 72 households.
