= Balajub, Hamadan =

Village in Hamadan province, Iran

Balajub Persian: بالاجوب
- Village
- Location within Iran
- Coordinates: 34°14′44″N 48°11′03″E
- Country: Iran
- Province: Hamadan
- County: Nahavand
- District: Zarrin Dasht
- Rural District: Garin

Population (2016)
  - Total: 358
- Time zone: UTC+3:30 (IRST)

Balajub (Persian: بالاجوب) (Note: Also romanized as Bālā Jūb and Bālājūb; also known as Bālājū) is a village in Garin Rural District of Zarrin Dasht District in Nahavand County, Hamadan province, Iran.

== Demographics ==
=== Population ===
At the time of the 2006 National Census, the village's population was 388 in 93 households. The following census in 2011 counted 384 people in 104 households. The 2016 census measured the population of the village as 358 people in 98 households.
