= Leylan, Hamadan =

Village in Hamadan province, Iran

Leylan Persian: ليلان
- Village
- Location within Iran
- Coordinates: 34°14′23″N 48°12′22″E
- Country: Iran
- Province: Hamadan
- County: Nahavand
- District: Zarrin Dasht
- Rural District: Garin

Population (2016)
  - Total: 454
- Time zone: UTC+3:30 (IRST)

Leylan (Persian: ليلان) (Note: Also romanized as Leylān) is a village in Garin Rural District of Zarrin Dasht District in Nahavand County, Hamadan province, Iran.

== Demographics ==
=== Population ===
At the time of the 2006 National Census, the village's population was 513 in 116 households. The following census in 2011 counted 477 people in 142 households. The 2016 census measured the population of the village as 454 people in 139 households.
