= Hish =

Hish (alternatively spelled Heish or Heesh) could refer to the following:

== Places ==
- Heshi, Iran, a village in northern Iran
- Hish, Syria, a town in northwestern Syria

== Other ==
- Hish (Haganah corps)
