= Tarik Darreh-ye Pain =

Tarik Darreh-ye Pain تاريكدره پائين
- Village
- Location within Iran
- Coordinates: 34°18′21″N 47°58′01″E
- Country: Iran
- Province: Hamadan
- County: Nahavand
- Bakhsh: Khezel
- Rural District: Khezel-e Sharqi

Population (2006)
  - Total: 110
- Time zone: UTC+3:30 (IRST)
  - Summer (DST): UTC+4:30 (IRDT)

Tarik Darreh-ye Pain (Persian: تاريكدره پائين, also Romanized as Tārīk Darreh-ye Pā'īn; also known as Deh-e Kabūd and Tārīk Darreh-ye Soflá) is a village in Khezel-e Sharqi Rural District, Khezel District, Nahavand County, Hamadan Province, Iran. At the 2006 census, its population was 110, in 29 families.
