= Firuzan =

City in Hamadan province, Iran

Firuzan Persian: فيروزان
- City
- Location within Iran
- Coordinates: 34°21′38″N 48°06′53″E
- Country: Iran
- Province: Hamadan
- County: Nahavand
- District: Khezel

Population (2016)
  - Total: 5,173
- Time zone: UTC+3:30 (IRST)

Firuzan (Persian: فيروزان) (Note: Also romanized as Fīrūzān) is a city in, and the capital of, Khezel District of Nahavand County, Hamadan province, Iran.

== Demographics ==
=== Population ===
At the time of the 2006 National Census, the city's population was 4,054 in 1,069 households. The following census in 2011 counted 4,635 people in 1,308 households. The 2016 census measured the population of the city as 5,173 people in 1,535 households.
