= Deh Firuzvand-e Pain =

Deh Firuzvand-e Pain ده فروزوند پايين
- Village
- Location within Iran
- Coordinates: 34°06′34″N 48°01′11″E
- Country: Iran
- Province: Lorestan
- County: Delfan
- Bakhsh: Central
- Rural District: Nurali

Population (2006)
  - Total: 138
- Time zone: UTC+3:30 (IRST)
  - Summer (DST): UTC+4:30 (IRDT)

Deh Firuzvand-e Pain (Persian: ده فروزوند پايين, also Romanized as Deh Fīrūzvand-e Pā’īn; also known as Deh Forūzvand-e Soflá, Deh Fīrūzvand, and Deh Fīrūzvand-e Soflá) is a village in Nurali Rural District, in the Central District of Delfan County, Lorestan Province, Iran. At the 2006 census, its population was 138, in 31 families.
