= Deh Firuzvand-e Bala =

Village in Lorestan, Iran

Deh Firuzvand-e Bala ده فروزوند بالا
- Village
- Location within Iran
- Coordinates: 34°08′20″N 48°00′20″E
- Country: Iran
- Province: Lorestan
- County: Delfan
- Bakhsh: Central
- Rural District: Nurali

Population (2006)
  - Total: 108
- Time zone: UTC+3:30 (IRST)
  - Summer (DST): UTC+4:30 (IRDT)

Deh Firuzvand-e Bala (Persian: ده فروزوند بالا, also Romanized as Deh Fīrūzvand-e Bālā; also known as Deh Fīrūzvand-e ‘Olyā, Deh Forūzvand-e ‘Olyā, and Denū-ye Deh Fīrūzvand) is a village in Nurali Rural District, in the Central District of Delfan County, Lorestan Province, Iran. At the 2006 census, its population was 108, in 29 families.
