= Seykavand-e Chovari =

Village in Lorestan province, Iran

Seykavand-e Chovari Persian: سيكوندچواري
- Village
- Location within Iran
- Coordinates: 34°09′59″N 48°00′24″E
- Country: Iran
- Province: Lorestan
- County: Delfan
- District: Central
- Rural District: Nurali

Population (2016)
  - Total: 290
- Time zone: UTC+3:30 (IRST)

Seykavand-e Chovari (Persian: سيكوندچواري) (Note: Also romanized as Seykavand-e Chavari, Seykavand-e Chavārī, and Seykavand-e Chovārī; also known as Sagvand, Seykavand, Seykvand, and Sīkvand)) is a village in Nurali Rural District of the Central District in Delfan County, Lorestan province, Iran.

== Demographics ==
=== Population ===
At the time of the 2006 National Census, the village's population was 301 in 63 households. The following census in 2011 counted 346 people in 92 households. The 2016 census measured the population of the village as 290 people in 84 households.
