= Darreh-ye Deh-e Pahlavan =

Village in Lorestan province, Iran

Darreh-ye Deh-e Pahlavan Persian: دره ده پهلوان
- Village
- Location within Iran
- Coordinates: 34°08′46″N 47°54′45″E
- Country: Iran
- Province: Lorestan
- County: Delfan
- District: Central
- Rural District: Nurali

Population (2016)
  - Total: 602
- Time zone: UTC+3:30 (IRST)

Darreh-ye Deh-e Pahlavan (Persian: دره ده پهلوان) (Note: Also romanized as Darreh-ye Dah Pahlavan, Darreh-ye Dah Pahlavān, and Darreh-ye Deh-e Pahlavān) is a village in Nurali Rural District of the Central District in Delfan County, Lorestan province, Iran.

== Demographics ==
=== Population ===
At the time of the 2006 National Census, the village's population was 474 in 78 households. The following census in 2011 counted 412 people in 88 households. The 2016 census measured the population of the village as 602 people in 133 households.
