= Barzul =

City in Hamadan province, Iran

Barzul Persian: برزول
- City
- Location within Iran
- Coordinates: 34°12′46″N 48°15′36″E
- Country: Iran
- Province: Hamadan
- County: Nahavand
- District: Zarrin Dasht
- Established as a city: 2005

Population (2016)
  - Total: 2,457
- Time zone: UTC+3:30 (IRST)

Barzul (Persian: برزول) (Note: Also romanized as Barzūl) is a city in, and the capital of, Zarrin Dasht District of Nahavand County, Hamadan province, Iran. It also serves as the administrative center for Fazl Rural District. The village of Barzul was converted to s city in 2005.

== Demographics ==
=== Population ===
At the time of the 2006 National Census, the city's population was 2,729 in 728 households. The following census in 2011 counted 2,695 people in 825 households. The 2016 census measured the population of the city as 2,457 people in 774 households.
