= Găvan River =

Găvan River may refer to:

- Găvan, a tributary of the Olt in Brașov County
- Găvan River (Siret)

== See also ==
- Gavan (disambiguation)
