= Golam Bahri =

Village in Lorestan province, Iran

Golam Bahri Persian: گلام بهري
- Village
- Location within Iran
- Coordinates: 34°08′45″N 48°01′27″E
- Country: Iran
- Province: Lorestan
- County: Delfan
- District: Central
- Rural District: Nurali

Population (2016)
  - Total: 1,148
- Time zone: UTC+3:30 (IRST)

Golam Bahri (Persian: گلام بهري) (Note: Also romanized as Golām Baḩrī; also known as Gholām Baḩrī) is a village in Nurali Rural District of the Central District in Delfan County, Lorestan province, Iran.

== Demographics ==
=== Population ===
At the time of the 2006 National Census, the village's population was 1,048 in 241 households. The following census in 2011 counted 1,157 people in 304 households. The 2016 census measured the population of the village as 1,148 people in 324 households, the most populous in its rural district.
