= Doab-e Zali =

Village in Lorestan province, Iran

Doab-e Zali Persian: دوآب زالي
- Village
- Location within Iran
- Coordinates: 34°05′53″N 48°01′24″E
- Country: Iran
- Province: Lorestan
- County: Delfan
- District: Central
- Rural District: Nurali

Population (2016)
  - Total: 331
- Time zone: UTC+3:30 (IRST)

Doab-e Zali (Persian: دوآب زالي) (Note: Also romanized as Do Āb Zālī and Doāb-e Zālī; also known as Zālī Do Āb and Zālī-ye Dowāb) is a village in Nurali Rural District of the Central District in Delfan County, Lorestan province, Iran.

== Demographics ==
=== Population ===
At the time of the 2006 National Census, the village's population was 275 in 50 households. The following census in 2011 counted 246 people in 65 households. The 2016 census measured the population of the village as 331 people in 100 households.
