= Morad Jan =

Village in Lorestan province, Iran

Morad Jan Persian: مرادجان
- Village
- Location within Iran
- Coordinates: 34°11′49″N 47°58′03″E
- Country: Iran
- Province: Lorestan
- County: Delfan
- District: Central
- Rural District: Nurali

Population (2016)
  - Total: 681
- Time zone: UTC+3:30 (IRST)

Morad Jan (Persian: مرادجان) (Note: Also romanized as Morād Jān; also known as Marājān, Marjān, and Morādjān-e Chovārī) is a village in Nurali Rural District of the Central District in Delfan County, Lorestan province, Iran.

== Demographics ==
=== Population ===
At the time of the 2006 National Census, the village's population was 735 in 159 households. The following census in 2011 counted 801 people in 214 households. The 2016 census measured the population of the village as 681 people in 191 households.
