= Hasanabad-e Sanjabi =

Village in Lorestan province, Iran

Hasanabad-e Sanjabi Persian: حسن آباد سنجابي
- Village
- Location within Iran
- Coordinates: 34°08′08″N 47°56′37″E
- Country: Iran
- Province: Lorestan
- County: Delfan
- District: Central
- Rural District: Nurali

Population (2016)
  - Total: 582
- Time zone: UTC+3:30 (IRST)

Hasanabad-e Sanjabi (Persian: حسن آباد سنجابي) (Note: Also romanized as Ḩasanābād-e Sanjābī) is a village in Nurali Rural District of the Central District in Delfan County, Lorestan province, Iran.

== Demographics ==
=== Population ===
At the time of the 2006 National Census, the village's population was 553 in 112 households. The following census in 2011 counted 599 people in 155 households. The 2016 census measured the population of the village as 582 people in 154 households.
