= Gavan, Ardabil =

Village in Ardabil province, Iran

Gavan Persian: گاوان
- Village
- Location within Iran
- Coordinates: 37°23′36″N 48°12′03″E
- Country: Iran
- Province: Ardabil
- County: Khalkhal
- District: Khvoresh Rostam
- Rural District: Khvoresh Rostam-e Shomali

Population (2016)
  - Total: 31
- Time zone: UTC+3:30 (IRST)

Gavan (Persian: گاوان) (Note: Also romanized as Gāvān; also known as Kāvān (کاوان) and Kavān) is a village in Khvoresh Rostam-e Shomali Rural District of Khvoresh Rostam District in Khalkhal County, Ardabil province, Iran.

== Demographics ==
=== Population ===
At the time of the 2006 National Census, the village's population was 49 in 13 households. The following census in 2011 counted 23 people in nine households. The 2016 census measured the population of the village as 31 people in 23 households.
