= Azizabad-e Pain =

Village in Lorestan province, Iran

Azizabad-e Pain Persian: عزيزآباد پايين
- Village
- Location within Iran
- Coordinates: 34°05′05″N 47°59′48″E
- Country: Iran
- Province: Lorestan
- County: Delfan
- District: Central
- Rural District: Nurali

Population (2016)
  - Total: 211
- Time zone: UTC+3:30 (IRST)

Azizabad-e Pain (Persian: عزيزآباد پايين) (Note: Also romanized as ‘Azīzābād-e Pā’īn; also known as ‘Azīzābād-e Soflá) is a village in, and the former capital of, Nurali Rural District in the Central District of Delfan County, Lorestan province, Iran. The capital of the rural district has been transferred to the village of Deh Firuzvand-e Vosta.

== Demographics ==
=== Population ===
At the time of the 2006 National Census, the village's population was 147 in 26 households. The following census in 2011 counted 187 people in 42 households. The 2016 census measured the population of the village as 211 people in 45 households.
