= Heshi, Iran =

Village in Ardabil province, Iran

Heshi Persian: هشي
- Village
- Location within Iran
- Coordinates: 37°20′31″N 48°18′54″E
- Country: Iran
- Province: Ardabil
- County: Khalkhal
- District: Khvoresh Rostam
- Rural District: Khvoresh Rostam-e Shomali

Population (2016)
  - Total: 273
- Time zone: UTC+3:30 (IRST)

Heshi (Persian: هشي) (Note: Also romanized as Heshī; also known as Hishain, Hishi, Ishein, and Khishi) is a village in Khvoresh Rostam-e Shomali Rural District of Khvoresh Rostam District in Khalkhal County, Ardabil province, Iran.

== Demographics ==
=== Population ===
At the time of the 2006 National Census, the village's population was 146 in 41 households. The following census in 2011 counted 128 people in 42 households. The 2016 census measured the population of the village as 273 people in 94 households.
