= Garin Rural District =

Rural district in Hamadan province, Iran

Garin Rural District Persian: دهستان گرين
- Rural District
- Location within Iran
- Coordinates: 34°12′N 48°09′E
- Country: Iran
- Province: Hamadan
- County: Nahavand
- District: Zarrin Dasht
- Established: 2004
- Capital: Tavaneh

Population (2016)
  - Total: 6,858
- Time zone: UTC+3:30 (IRST)

Garin Rural District (Persian: دهستان گرين) is in Zarrin Dasht District of Nahavand County, Hamadan province, Iran. Its capital is the village of Tavaneh.

== Demographics ==
=== Population ===
At the time of the 2006 National Census, the rural district's population was 7,438 in 1,829 households. There were 7,375 inhabitants in 2,126 households at the following census of 2011. The 2016 census measured the population of the rural district as 6,858 in 2,056 households. The most populous of its seven villages was Tavaneh, with 2,397 people.

=== Other villages in the rural district ===
- Aznahri
- Balajub
- Chenari
- Gonbad-e Kabud
- Leylan
- Vali Sir Ab
