= Karaj-e Olya =

Karaj-e Olya كرج عليا
- Village
- Location within Iran
- Coordinates: 34°35′51″N 47°31′12″E
- Country: Iran
- Province: Kermanshah
- County: Sahneh
- Bakhsh: Dinavar
- Rural District: Dinavar

Population (2006)
  - Total: 160
- Time zone: UTC+3:30 (IRST)
  - Summer (DST): UTC+4:30 (IRDT)

Karaj-e Olya (Persian: كرج عليا, also Romanized as Karaj-e ‘Olyā) is a village in Dinavar Rural District, Dinavar District, Sahneh County, Kermanshah Province, Iran. At the 2006 census, its population was 160, in 46 families.
