= Solgi Rural District =

Rural district in Hamadan province, Iran

Solgi Rural District Persian: دهستان سلگی
- Rural District
- Location within Iran
- Coordinates: 34°15′N 48°07′E
- Country: Iran
- Province: Hamadan
- County: Nahavand
- District: Khezel
- Established: 1987
- Capital: Shahrak

Population (2016)
  - Total: 13,257
- Time zone: UTC+3:30 (IRST)

Solgi Rural District (Persian: دهستان سلگی) is in Khezel District of Nahavand County, Hamadan province, Iran. Its capital is the village of Shahrak.

== Demographics ==
=== Population ===
At the time of the 2006 National Census, the rural district's population was 13,923 in 3,393 households. There were 13,740 inhabitants in 4,006 households at the following census of 2011. The 2016 census measured the population of the rural district as 13,257 in 4,126 households. The most populous of its 26 villages was Razini, with 3,118 people.

=== Other villages in the rural district ===
- Farsban
- Givaki
- Habibabad
- Leyli Yadegar
- Rudbari
- Shiravand

== Archaeology ==
Archaeological evidence demonstrates that the settlement history dates back as far as the early Bronze Age.
