= Deh-e Bozorg-e Firuzabad =

Deh-e Bozorg-e Firuzabad ده بزرگ فيروزاباد
- Village
- Location within Iran
- Coordinates: 30°43′52″N 51°27′02″E
- Country: Iran
- Province: Kohgiluyeh and Boyer-Ahmad
- County: Boyer-Ahmad
- Bakhsh: Central
- Rural District: Sarrud-e Jonubi

Population (2006)
  - Total: 494
- Time zone: UTC+3:30 (IRST)
  - Summer (DST): UTC+4:30 (IRDT)

Deh-e Bozorg-e Firuzabad (Persian: ده بزرگ فيروزاباد, also Romanized as Deh-e Bozorg-e Fīrūzābād) is a village in Sarrud-e Jonubi Rural District, in the Central District of Boyer-Ahmad County, Kohgiluyeh and Boyer-Ahmad Province, Iran. At the 2006 census, its population was 494, in 106 families.
