= Heshik =

Heshik هشيك
- Village
- Location within Iran
- Coordinates: 27°35′07″N 60°58′39″E
- Country: Iran
- Province: Sistan and Baluchestan
- County: Khash
- Bakhsh: Irandegan
- Rural District: Irandegan

Population (2006)
  - Total: 235
- Time zone: UTC+3:30 (IRST)
  - Summer (DST): UTC+4:30 (IRDT)

Heshik (Persian: هشيك, also Romanized as Heshīk; also known as Hashak, Hashik, and Heshī) is a village in Irandegan Rural District, Irandegan District, Khash County, Sistan and Baluchestan Province, Iran. At the 2006 census, its population was 235, in 55 families.
