= Khvoresh Rostam-e Shomali Rural District =

Rural district in Ardabil province, Iran

Khvoresh Rostam-e Shomali Rural District Persian: دهستان خورش رستم شمالي
- Rural District
- Location within Iran
- Coordinates: 37°22′N 48°22′E
- Country: Iran
- Province: Ardabil
- County: Khalkhal
- District: Khvoresh Rostam
- Established: 1987
- Capital: Hashjin

Population (2016)
  - Total: 3,239
- Time zone: UTC+3:30 (IRST)

Khvoresh Rostam-e Shomali Rural District (Persian: دهستان خورش رستم شمالي) is in Khvoresh Rostam District of Khalkhal County, Ardabil province, Iran. It is administered from the city of Hashjin. It is in the Alborz (Elburz) mountain range.

== Demographics ==
=== Population ===
At the time of the 2006 National Census, the rural district's population was 4,284 in 1,201 households. There were 3,458 inhabitants in 1,164 households the following census of 2011. The 2016 census measured the population of the rural district as 3,239 in 1,143 households. The most populous of its 34 villages was Kazaj, with 820 people.

=== Other villages in the rural district ===
- Ardabilaq
- Chenar
- Damdol
- Dayu Kandi
- Diz
- Dustli
- Gavan
- Gelgelab
- Heshi
- Kabudchi
- Kajal
- Kamar
- Kargazlu
- Khat Parast
- Khush Nameh
- Kivi
- Manamin
- Mirahjin
- Now Deh
- Qareh Tekan
- Qusajin
- Seqizchi
- Shamsabad
- Vanan
- Zaviyeh-ye Kivi
