= Abd ol Maleki, Razavi Khorasan =

Abd ol Maleki عبدالملكي
- Village
- Location within Iran
- Coordinates: 35°42′02″N 56°59′47″E
- Country: Iran
- Province: Razavi Khorasan
- County: Sabzevar
- Bakhsh: Rud Ab
- Rural District: Kuh Hamayi

Population (2006)
  - Total: 56
- Time zone: UTC+3:30 (IRST)
  - Summer (DST): UTC+4:30 (IRDT)

Abd ol Maleki (Persian: عبدالملكي, also Romanized as ʿAbd ol Maleḵī; also known as Abdolmalekī-ye paeen) is a village in Kuh Hamayi Rural District, Rud Ab District, Sabzevar County, Razavi Khorasan Province, Iran. At the 2006 census, its population was 56, in 12 families.

== See also ==
- List of cities, towns and villages in Razavi Khorasan Province
