= Deh Musa, Kermanshah =

Deh Musa ده موسي
- Village
- Location within Iran
- Coordinates: 33°54′03″N 47°07′05″E
- Country: Iran
- Province: Kermanshah
- County: Kermanshah
- Bakhsh: Firuzabad
- Rural District: Jalalvand

Population (2006)
  - Total: 233
- Time zone: UTC+3:30 (IRST)
  - Summer (DST): UTC+4:30 (IRDT)

Deh Musa (Persian: ده موسي, also Romanized as Deh Mūsá) is a village in Jalalvand Rural District, Firuzabad District, Kermanshah County, Kermanshah Province, Iran. At the 2006 census, its population was 233, in 53 families.
