= Golgolab, East Azerbaijan =

Golgolab گل گلاب
- Village
- Location within Iran
- Coordinates: 37°22′06″N 48°03′27″E
- Country: Iran
- Province: East Azerbaijan
- County: Meyaneh
- Bakhsh: Kaghazkonan
- Rural District: Kaghazkonan-e Shomali

Population (2006)
  - Total: 72
- Time zone: UTC+3:30 (IRST)
  - Summer (DST): UTC+4:30 (IRDT)

Golgolab (Persian: گل گلاب, also Romanized as Golgolāb; also known as Gil’gilyan) is a village in Kaghazkonan-e Shomali Rural District, Kaghazkonan District, Meyaneh County, East Azerbaijan Province, Iran. At the 2006 census, its population was 72, in 29 families.
