= Abd ol Maleki, Kermanshah =

Abd ol Maleki عبدالملكي
- Village
- Location within Iran
- Coordinates: 34°44′33″N 46°51′17″E
- Country: Iran
- Province: Kermanshah
- County: Kermanshah
- Bakhsh: Central
- Rural District: Razavar

Population (2006)
  - Total: 55
- Time zone: UTC+3:30 (IRST)
  - Summer (DST): UTC+4:30 (IRDT)

Abd ol Maleki (Persian: عبدالملكي, also Romanized as ‘Abd ol Malekī) is a village in Razavar Rural District, in the Central District of Kermanshah County, Kermanshah Province, Iran. At the 2006 census, its population was 55, in 11 families.
