= Karkasar =

Karkasar كركسار
- Village
- Location within Iran
- Coordinates: 34°36′50″N 47°28′46″E
- Country: Iran
- Province: Kermanshah
- County: Sahneh
- Bakhsh: Dinavar
- Rural District: Dinavar

Population (2006)
  - Total: 237
- Time zone: UTC+3:30 (IRST)
  - Summer (DST): UTC+4:30 (IRDT)

Karkasar (Persian: كركسار, also Romanized as Karkasār and Kark Sār; also known as Kargesār and Kargsār) is a village in Dinavar Rural District, Dinavar District, Sahneh County, Kermanshah Province, Iran. At the 2006 census, its population was 237, in 63 families.
