= Deh Kabud-e Chovari =

Village in Lorestan province, Iran

Deh Kabud-e Chovari Persian: ده كبودچواري
- Village
- Location within Iran
- Coordinates: 34°10′58″N 47°58′31″E
- Country: Iran
- Province: Lorestan
- County: Delfan
- District: Central
- Rural District: Nurali

Population (2016)
  - Total: 750
- Time zone: UTC+3:30 (IRST)

Deh Kabud-e Chovari (Persian: ده كبودچواري) (Note: Also romanized as Deh Kabūd-e Chovārī; also known as Deh Kabūd, Deh Qabūt, and Deh-i-Kabūd) is a village in Nurali Rural District of the Central District in Delfan County, Lorestan province, Iran.

== Demographics ==
=== Population ===
At the time of the 2006 National Census, the village's population was 798 in 173 households. The following census in 2011 counted 816 people in 199 households. The 2016 census measured the population of the village as 750 people in 197 households.
