= Khvoresh Rostam-e Jonubi Rural District =

Rural district in Ardabil province, Iran

Khvoresh Rostam-e Jonubi Rural District Persian: دهستان خورش رستم جنوبي
- Rural District
- Location within Iran
- Coordinates: 37°14′N 48°33′E
- Country: Iran
- Province: Ardabil
- County: Khalkhal
- District: Khvoresh Rostam
- Established: 1987
- Capital: Barandaq

Population (2016)
  - Total: 4,875
- Time zone: UTC+3:30 (IRST)

Khvoresh Rostam-e Jonubi Rural District (Persian: دهستان خورش رستم جنوبي) is in Khvoresh Rostam District of Khalkhal County, Ardabil province, Iran. Its capital is the village of Barandaq.

== Demographics ==
=== Population ===
At the time of the 2006 National Census, the rural district's population was 5,775 in 1,365 households. There were 4,745 inhabitants in 1,335 households the following census of 2011. The 2016 census measured the population of the rural district as 4,875 in 1,537 households. The most populous of its 18 villages was Barandaq, with 1,820 people.

=== Other villages in the rural district ===
- Ahu
- Aqsu
- Chenarlaq
- Golujeh
- Jafarabad
- Karnaq
- Nemahil
- Nesaz
- Pishgaman
- Sefid Ab
- Sejahrud
- Tuyestan
- Viu
- Zaviyeh-ye Jafarabad
