= Alexandru Găvan =

Romanian mountaineer (born 1982)

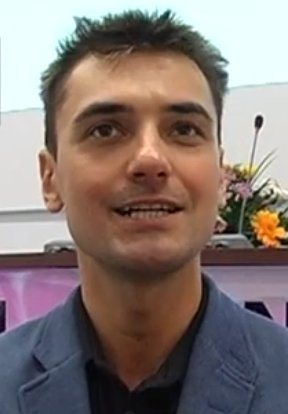

Alex Găvan (born 19 May 1982) is a Romanian mountaineer specializing in Himalayan climbing of 8,000 meter peaks without using supplemental oxygen or sherpa support in his ascents. By now he had successfully climbed seven eight-thousanders .

Since 2006, Găvan runs a special project to climb all 14 eight-thousanders in the world. He is the first Romanian climber to reach the summit of Gasherbrum I, Makalu, and Shishapangma. His other three successful climbs of Cho Oyu, Manaslu, and Broad Peak are second Romanian ascents. In 2006, with the successful ascent of Cho Oyu, he became at 24 years old the youngest Romanian ever to have climbed an eight-thousander and was among the few who freely spoke about the Nangpa La shootings. He was awarded with "The 2007 Romanian Sportsman of the Year in High Altitude Mountaineering" by the Romanian Federation of Alpinism and Sport Climbing for the first Romanian ascent of Gasherbrum I.

== 8,000 m+ mountains summited ==
- 2006: Cho Oyu (8,201 m) - second Romanian ascent, without bottled oxygen
- 2007: Gasherbrum I (8,080 m) – first Romanian ascent, without bottled oxygen, alpine style
- 2008: Makalu (8,485 m) – first Romanian ascent, without bottled oxygen
- 2011: Manaslu (8,156 m) – second Romanian ascent, without bottled oxygen
- 2013: Shishapangma (8,027 m) - first Romanian ascent, without bottled oxygen
- 2014: Broad Peak (8,047 m) - second Romanian ascent, without bottled oxygen
- 2019: Gasherbrum II (8,035 m) - third Romanian ascent, without bottled oxygen

== Other notable ascents ==
- 2004: Chapaeva (6,130 m)
- 2005: Mont Blanc (4,810 m) – Miage–Bionnassay route

== Notes ==
In 2007 and 2008, Găvan attempted Gasherbrum II (8,034 m), but due to bad weather and high avalanche risk, he was forced to retreat, both times, at 7,000 m.
