= Tarik Darreh =

Tarik Darreh تاریک درّه
- Village
- Location within Iran
- Coordinates: 36°50′00″N 49°54′00″E
- Country: Iran
- Province: Gilan
- County: Siahkal
- Bakhsh: Deylaman
- Rural District: Deylaman

Population (2016)
  - Total: 53
- Time zone: UTC+3:30 (IRST)

Tarik Darreh (Persian: تاریک درّه, also Romanized as Tārīk Darreh) is a village in Deylaman Rural District, Deylaman District, Siahkal County, Gilan Province, Iran. At the 2016 census, its population was 53, in 20 families.
