= Cheshmeh Mahi, Razavi Khorasan =

Cheshmeh Mahi چشمه ماهي
- Village
- Location within Iran
- Coordinates: 36°41′25″N 59°06′26″E
- Country: Iran
- Province: Razavi Khorasan
- County: Chenaran
- Bakhsh: Central
- Rural District: Chenaran

Population (2006)
  - Total: 27
- Time zone: UTC+3:30 (IRST)
  - Summer (DST): UTC+4:30 (IRDT)

Cheshmeh Mahi (Persian: چشمه ماهي, also Romanized as Cheshmeh Māhī and Chashmeh Māhī) is a village in Chenaran Rural District, in the Central District of Chenaran County, Razavi Khorasan Province, Iran. At the 2006 census, its population was 27, in 5 families.
