= Deh-e Kabud, Kermanshah =

Deh-e Kabud ده كبود
- Village
- Location within Iran
- Coordinates: 34°19′27″N 47°22′57″E
- Country: Iran
- Province: Kermanshah
- County: Kermanshah
- Bakhsh: Central
- Rural District: Dorudfaraman

Population (2006)
  - Total: 433
- Time zone: UTC+3:30 (IRST)
  - Summer (DST): UTC+4:30 (IRDT)

Deh-e Kabud (Persian: ده كبود, also Romanized as Deh-e Kabūd and Deh Kabūd) is a village in Dorudfaraman Rural District, in the Central District of Kermanshah County, Kermanshah Province, Iran. At the 2006 census, its population was 433, in 96 families.
