= Viu (building) =

High-rise condominium in Gatineau, Canada

Viũ
- Interactive map of the Viũ area
- Alternative names: The Viu/Le Viu (French), VIŨ

General information
- Location: 185 Rue Laurier, Gatineau, Quebec, Canada
- Coordinates: 45.4355°N 75.7094°W
- Year built: 2012-2013
- Construction started: 2012
- Completed: October 2013
- Owner: Heafey Group

Height
- Height: 61.6m

Technical details
- Floor count: 19

Design and construction
- Architect: PMA Architects

Website
- leviu.ca

Viũ is a condominium in downtown Gatineau, located in Quebec. It faces the Jacques-Cartier National Park, Ottawa River, and the capital of Canada, Ottawa. Construction began in 2012, and ended in 2013. It is located beside the more recently constructed Viũ 2, with construction beginning in 2019 completing in 2022.
