= Kolehjub-e Dartang =

Kolehjub-e Dartang كله جوب درتنگ
- Village
- Location within Iran
- Coordinates: 34°34′33″N 47°26′55″E
- Country: Iran
- Province: Kermanshah
- County: Sahneh
- Bakhsh: Dinavar
- Rural District: Dinavar

Population (2006)
  - Total: 142
- Time zone: UTC+3:30 (IRST)
  - Summer (DST): UTC+4:30 (IRDT)

Kolehjub-e Dartang (Persian: كله جوب درتنگ, also Romanized as Kolehjūb-e Dartang) is a village in Dinavar Rural District, Dinavar District, Sahneh County, Kermanshah Province, Iran. At the 2006 census, its population was 142, in 38 families.
