= Fazl Rural District (Nahavand County) =

Rural district in Hamadan province, Iran

Fazl Rural District Persian: دهستان فضل
- Rural District
- Location within Iran
- Coordinates: 34°13′N 48°16′E
- Country: Iran
- Province: Hamadan
- County: Nahavand
- District: Zarrin Dasht
- Established: 1987
- Capital: Barzul

Population (2016)
  - Total: 3,731
- Time zone: UTC+3:30 (IRST)

Fazl Rural District (Persian: دهستان فضل) is in Zarrin Dasht District of Nahavand County, Hamadan province, Iran. It is administered from the city of Barzul.

== Demographics ==
=== Population ===
At the time of the 2006 National Census, the rural district's population was 4,268 in 1,068 households. There were 4,042 inhabitants in 1,169 households at the following census of 2011. The 2016 census measured the population of the rural district as 3,731 in 1,205 households. The most populous of its nine villages was Zaramin-e Sofla, with 1,403 people.

=== Other villages in the rural district ===
- Akbarabad
- Anbar Qanbar
- Asgarabad
- Band Aman
- Doraneh
- Sar Duran
- Zaramin-e Olya
