= Deh Firuzvand-e Vosta =

Village in Lorestan province, Iran

Deh Firuzvand-e Vosta Persian: ده فروزوند وسطي
- Village
- Location within Iran
- Coordinates: 34°07′51″N 48°00′37″E
- Country: Iran
- Province: Lorestan
- County: Delfan
- District: Central
- Rural District: Nurali

Population (2016)
  - Total: 434
- Time zone: UTC+3:30 (IRST)

Deh Firuzvand-e Vosta (Persian: ده فروزوند وسطي) (Note: Also romanized as Deh Fīrūzvand-e Vosţá; also known as Deh Fīrūzeh Vand, Deh Forūzvand-e Vostá, Dehfīrūzvand, and Fīrūzmand) is a village in, and the capital of, Nurali Rural District in the Central District of Delfan County, Lorestan province, Iran. The previous capital of the rural district was the village of Azizabad-e Pain.

== Demographics ==
=== Population ===
At the time of the 2006 National Census, the village's population was 434 in 81 households. The following census in 2011 counted 442 people in 99 households. The 2016 census measured the population of the village as 434 people in 111 households.
