= Karaj-e Sofla =

Karaj-e Sofla كرج سفلي
- Village
- Location within Iran
- Coordinates: 34°35′43″N 47°31′04″E
- Country: Iran
- Province: Kermanshah
- County: Sahneh
- Bakhsh: Dinavar
- Rural District: Dinavar

Population (2006)
  - Total: 65
- Time zone: UTC+3:30 (IRST)
  - Summer (DST): UTC+4:30 (IRDT)

Karaj-e Sofla (Persian: كرج سفلي, also Romanized as Karaj-e Soflá) is a village in Dinavar Rural District, Dinavar District, Sahneh County, Kermanshah Province, Iran. At the 2006 census, its population was 65, in 23 families.
