= Balajub, Kermanshah =

Balajub بالاجوب
- Village
- Location within Iran
- Coordinates: 34°37′35″N 47°27′13″E
- Country: Iran
- Province: Kermanshah
- County: Sahneh
- Bakhsh: Dinavar
- Rural District: Dinavar

Population (2006)
  - Total: 368
- Time zone: UTC+3:30 (IRST)
  - Summer (DST): UTC+4:30 (IRDT)

Balajub (Persian: بالاجوب, also Romanized as Bālājūb) is a village in Dinavar Rural District, Dinavar District, Sahneh County, Kermanshah Province, Iran. At the 2006 census, its population was 368, in 89 families.
