= Ghezel Ozan =

River in Iran

Coordinates: 35.6934°N 46.7745°E

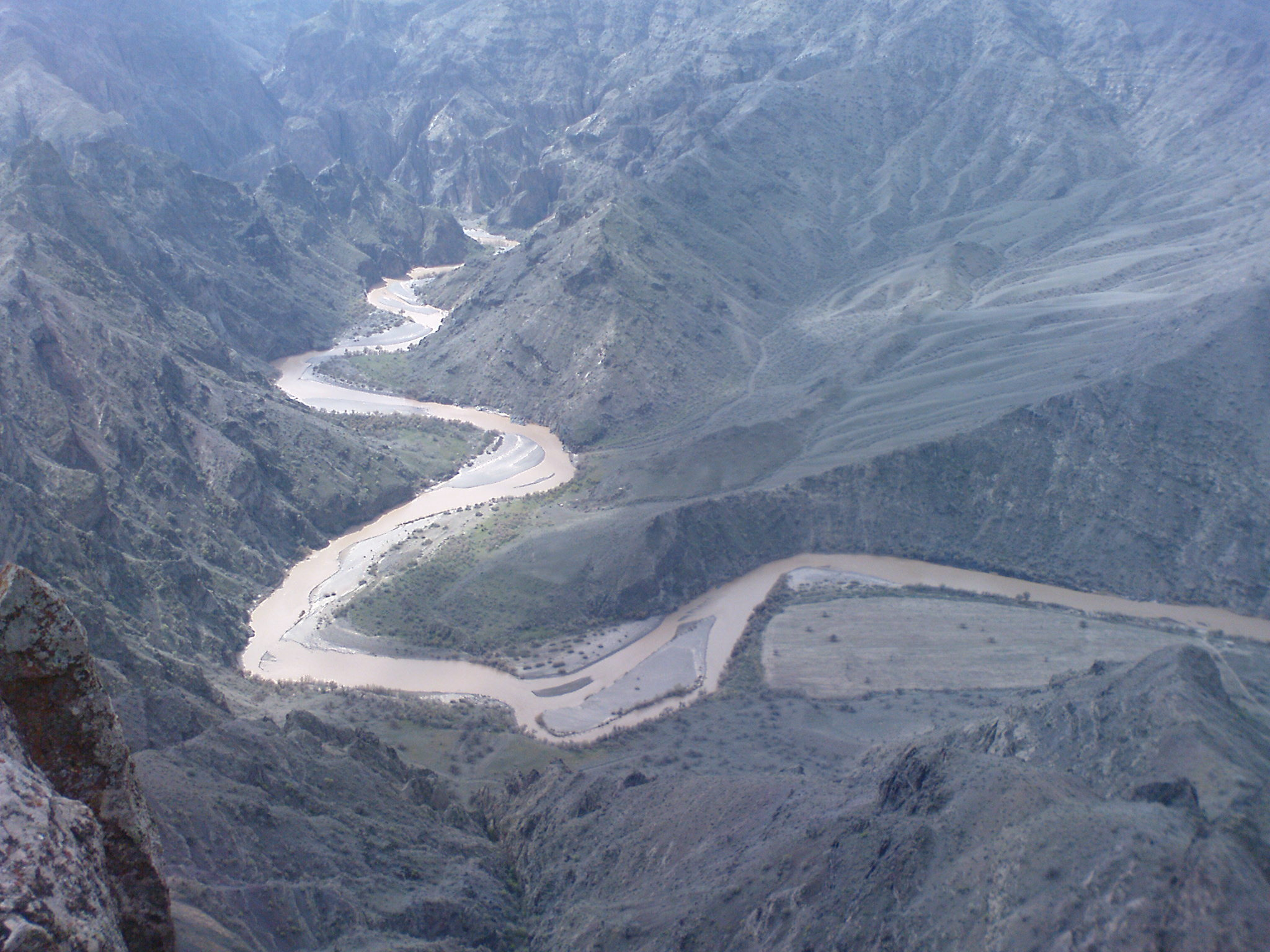
Aerial view of the Ghezel Ozan in the border area of Ardabil Province, Zanjan Province and East Azerbaijan Province.

The Ghezel Ozan (South Azerbaijani: قیزیل اؤزن (Red River), Persian: قزل اوزن / Qezel Owzan) (also spelled Ghezel Ozen) is one of the longest rivers in Iran, originating from the Chehel Cheshmeh Mountains between Saqqez and Divandarreh in Kurdistan Province flowing in northern Iran.

It flows through Kurdistan Province, Zanjan Province, East Azerbaijan Province, Ardabil Province, and Gilan Province.

It is one of two tributaries forming the Sefid-Rud river, with the Shahrood. The Sefīd-Rūd is a major river and tributary of the Caspian Sea. Its catchment area is about 48,600 km^{2} (18,800 sq mi).

== Course ==
The Ghezel Ozan headwaters are in the Zagros Mountains, in a region near Divan Darreh in Kurdistan Province. It runs northeastwards through Miyaneh County in East Azarbaijan and then Khalkhal County in Ardabil Province and then Zanjan County and Tarom County in Zanjan Province eastwards through the Alborz mountain range in Gilan Province.

At Rudbar in the southwestern Alborz, the Ghezel Ozan joins the Shah Rud−Shahrood river to form the Sefīd-Rūd river (meaning White River in Persian). Then the Sefid-Rud flows northwards in Gilan Province, through the Alborz range to the Caspian Sea.

== Nomenclature ==
Sometimes the Ghezel Ozan and the Sefīd-Rūd are considered a single river, and the words "Ghezel Ozan" and "Sefid-Rud" are used synonymously for the entire river that flows from the Zagros Mountains in Kordestan Province to the Caspian Sea.

== See also ==
- Alborz mountain range topics
- Zagros Mountains topics
