= Nurali Rural District =

Rural district in Lorestan province, Iran

Nurali Rural District Persian: دهستان نورعلي
- Rural District
- Location within Iran
- Coordinates: 34°09′N 47°58′E
- Country: Iran
- Province: Lorestan
- County: Delfan
- District: Central
- Established: 1987
- Capital: Deh Firuzvand-e Vosta

Population (2016)
  - Total: 7,119
- Time zone: UTC+3:30 (IRST)

Nurali Rural District (Persian: دهستان نورعلي) is in the Central District of Delfan County, Lorestan province, Iran. Its capital is the village of Deh Firuzvand-e Vosta. The previous capital of the rural district was the village of Azizabad-e Pain.

== Demographics ==
=== Population ===
At the time of the 2006 National Census, the rural district's population was 7,173 in 1,531 households. There were 7,391 inhabitants in 1,884 households at the following census of 2011. The 2016 census measured the population of the rural district as 7,119 in 1,910 households. The most populous of its 47 villages was Golam Bahri, with 1,148 people.

=== Other villages in the rural district ===
- Darreh-ye Deh-e Pahlavan
- Deh Kabud-e Chovari
- Doab-e Zali
- Morad Jan
- Hasanabad-e Sanjabi
- Seykavand-e Chovari
