= Khezel-e Sharqi Rural District =

Rural district in Hamadan province, Iran

Khezel-e Sharqi Rural District Persian: دهستان خزل شرقي
- Rural District
- Location within Iran
- Coordinates: 34°20′N 48°05′E
- Country: Iran
- Province: Hamadan
- County: Nahavand
- District: Khezel
- Established: 1987

Population (2016)
  - Total: 11,538
- Time zone: UTC+3:30 (IRST)

Khezel-e Sharqi Rural District (Persian: دهستان خزل شرقي) is in Khezel District of Nahavand County, Hamadan province, Iran.

== Demographics ==
=== Population ===
At the time of the 2006 National Census, the rural district's population was 12,926 in 3,028 households. There were 11,706 inhabitants in 3,375 households at the following census of 2011. The 2016 census measured the population of the rural district as 11,538 in 3,468 households. The most populous of its 42 villages was Abd ol Maleki, with 1,025 people.

=== Other villages in the rural district ===
- Deh Musa
- Deh Now-e Abd ol Maleki
- Firuzabad-e Sofla
- Kahriz-e Salah ol Din
- Kahriz-e Salim
- Sharifabad
- Vasaj
