= Zarrin Dasht District =

District in Hamadan province, Iran

Zarrin Dasht District Persian: بخش زرين دشت
- District
- Location within Iran
- Coordinates: 34°12′N 48°12′E
- Country: Iran
- Province: Hamadan
- County: Nahavand
- Established: 2002
- Capital: Barzul

Population (2016)
  - Total: 13,046
- Time zone: UTC+3:30 (IRST)

Zarrin Dasht District (Persian: بخش زرين دشت) is in Nahavand County, Hamadan province, Iran. Its capital is the city of Barzul.

== Demographics ==
=== Population ===
At the time of the 2006 National Census, the district's population was 14,435 in 3,625 households. The following census in 2011 counted 14,112 people in 4,120 households. The 2016 census measured the population of the district as 13,046 inhabitants in 4,035 households.

=== Administrative divisions ===
Zarrin Dasht District Population
Administrative Divisions	2006	2011	2016
Fazl RD	4,268	4,042	3,731
Garin RD	7,438	7,375	6,858
Barzul (city)	2,729	2,695	2,457
Total	14,435	14,112	13,046
RD = Rural District
