= Khezel District =

District in Hamadan province, Iran

Khezel District Persian: بخش خزل
- District
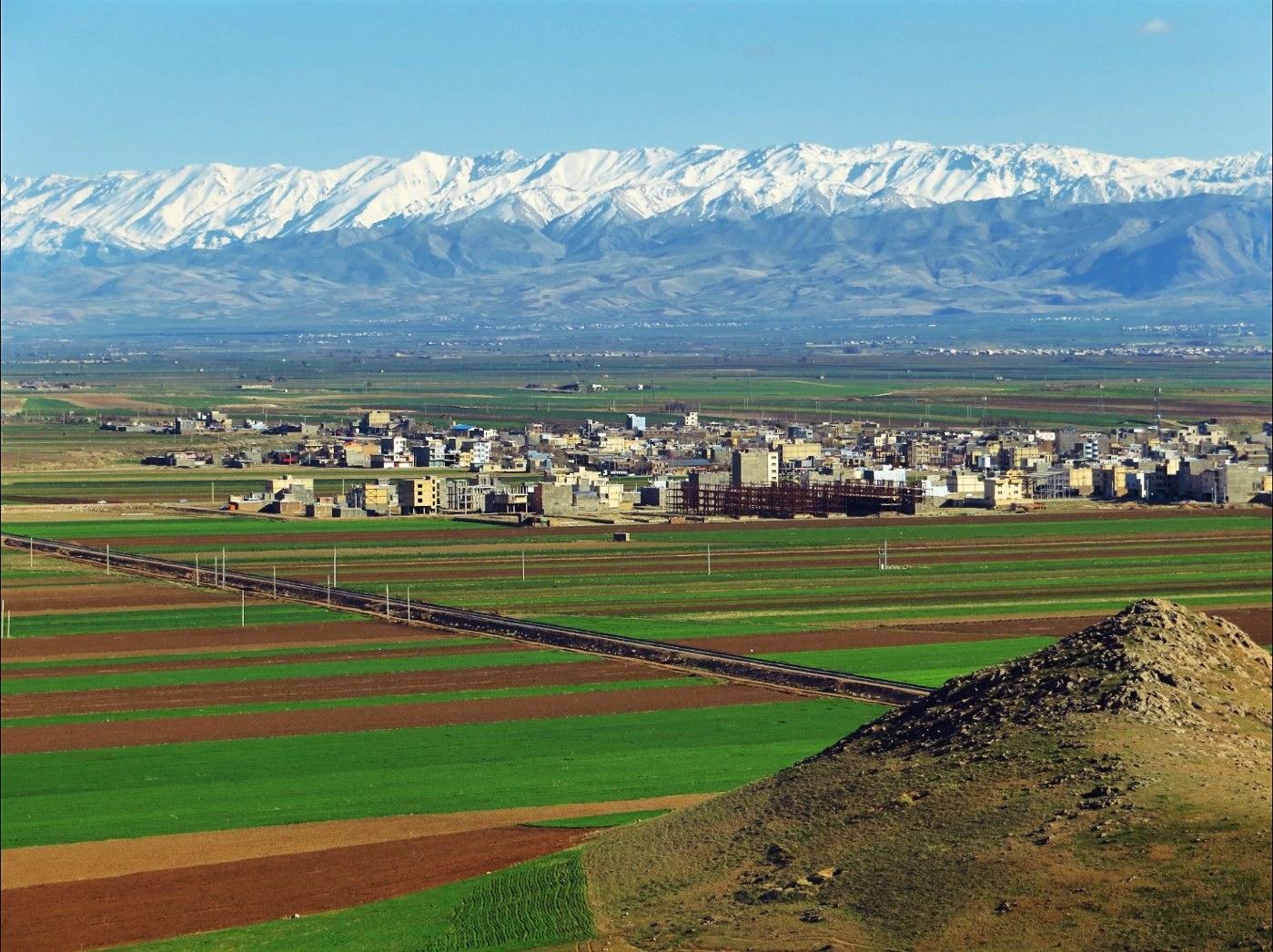
- Khezel District

- Location within Iran
- Coordinates: 34°18′N 48°05′E
- Country: Iran
- Province: Hamadan
- County: Nahavand
- Capital: Firuzan

Population (2016)
  - Total: 29,968
- Time zone: UTC+3:30 (IRST)

Khezel District (Persian: بخش خزل) is in Nahavand County, Hamadan province, Iran. Its capital is the city of Firuzan.

== Demographics ==
=== Population ===
At the time of the 2006 National Census, the district's population was 30,903 in 7,490 households. The following census in 2011 counted 30,081 people in 8,689 households. The 2016 census measured the population of the district as 29,968 inhabitants in 9,129 households.

=== Administrative divisions ===
Khezel District Population
Administrative Divisions	2006	2011	2016
Khezel-e Sharqi RD	12,926	11,706	11,538
Solgi RD	13,923	13,740	13,257
Firuzan (city)	4,054	4,635	5,173
Total	30,903	30,081	29,968
RD = Rural District
