= Nahavand County =

County in Hamadan province, Iran

Nahavand County Persian: شهرستان نهاوند
- County
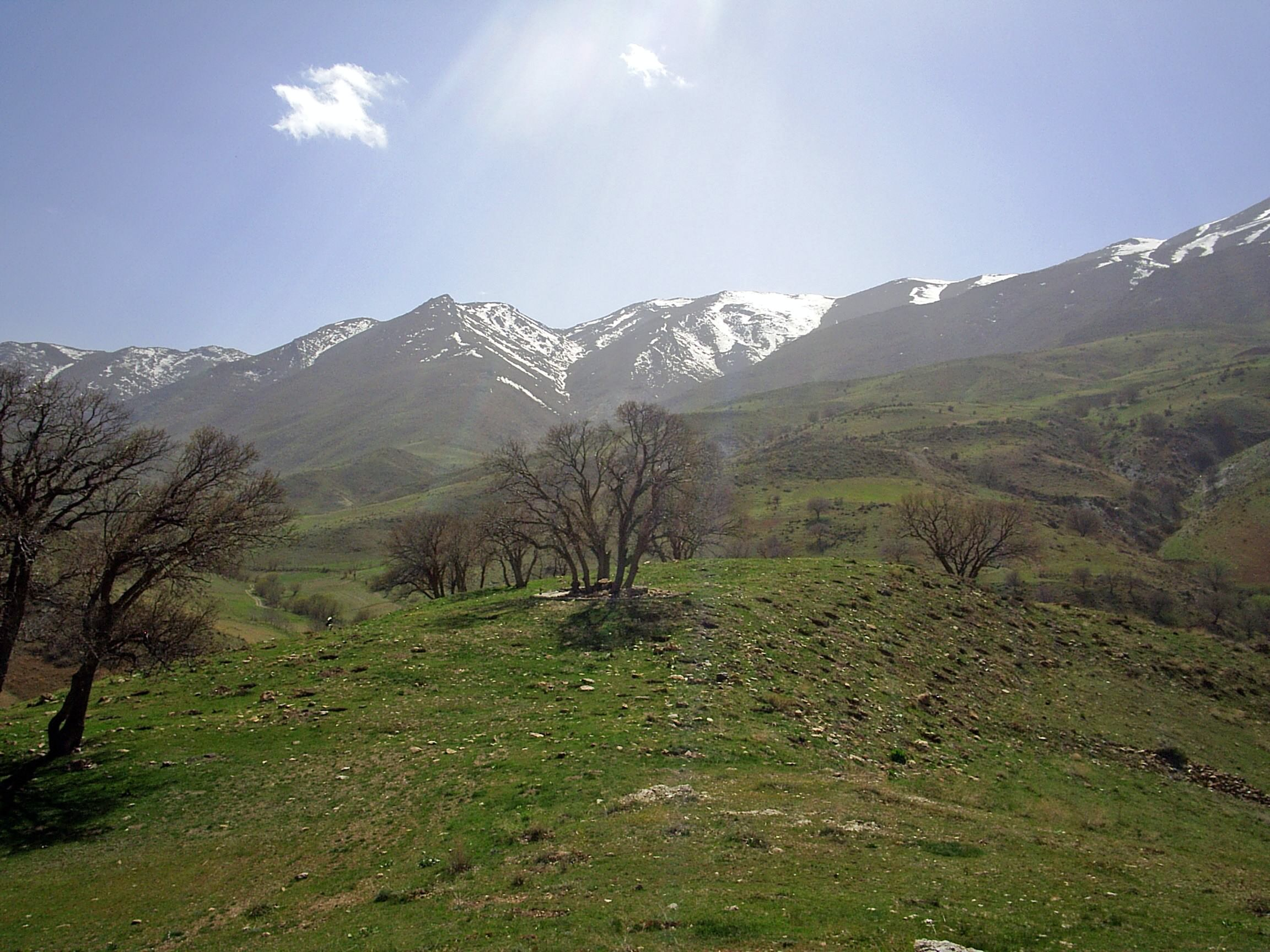
- Landscape in Nahavand County

- Location of Nahavand County in Hamadan province (bottom, green)

- Location of Hamadan province in Iran
- Coordinates: 34°13′N 48°13′E
- Country: Iran
- Province: Hamadan
- Capital: Nahavand
- Districts: Central, Giyan, Khezel, Zarrin Dasht

Population (2016)
  - Total: 178,787
- Time zone: UTC+3:30 (IRST)

Nahavand County (Persian: شهرستان نهاوند) is in Hamadan province, Iran. Its capital is the city of Nahavand.

== Demographics ==
=== Population ===
At the time of the 2006 National Census, the county's population was 178,683 in 46,283 households. The following census in 2011 counted 181,711 people in 53,821 households. The 2016 census measured the population of the county as 178,787 in 55,542 households.

=== Administrative divisions ===
Nahavand County's population history and administrative structure over three consecutive censuses are shown in the following table.

Nahavand County Population
Administrative Divisions	2006	2011	2016
Central District	116,092	119,191	117,270
Gamasiyab RD	14,597	14,983	13,616
Shaban RD	15,321	15,250	14,321
Tariq ol Eslam RD	13,956	13,513	13,171
Nahavand (city)	72,218	75,445	76,162
Giyan District	17,253	17,811	17,027
Giyan RD	2,705	3,038	2,863
Sarab RD	6,486	6,671	5,978
Giyan (city)	8,062	8,102	8,186
Khezel District	30,903	30,081	29,968
Khezel-e Sharqi RD	12,926	11,706	11,538
Solgi RD	13,923	13,740	13,257
Firuzan (city)	4,054	4,635	5,173
Zarrin Dasht District	14,435	14,112	13,046
Fazl RD	4,268	4,042	3,731
Garin RD	7,438	7,375	6,858
Barzul (city)	2,729	2,695	2,457
Total	178,683	181,711	178,787
RD = Rural District

== See also ==
Media related to Nahavand County at Wikimedia Commons
