= Khvoresh Rostam District =

District in Ardabil province, Iran

Khoresh-e Rostam District Persian: بخش خورش رستم
- District
- Location within Iran
- Coordinates: 37°18′N 48°27′E
- Country: Iran
- Province: Ardabil
- County: Khalkhal
- Capital: Hashjin

Population (2016)
  - Total: 13,839
- Time zone: UTC+3:30 (IRST)

Khoresh-e Rostam District (Persian: بخش خورش رستم) is in Khalkhal County, Ardabil province, Iran. Its capital is the city of Hashjin (Hashajin). The district is located east of the Qizil Üzan river, in the Alborz (Elburz) mountain range.

== Language ==
The native language of the people of Khvoresh Rostam District in Ardabil Province is Azerbaijani language (Azeri). Karani a dialect of Tati language, which is a northwestern Iranian language, is also spoken in the district.

== Demographics ==
=== Population ===
At the time of the 2006 National Census, the district's population was 14,577 in 3,765 households. The following census in 2011 counted 12,781 people in 3,808 households. The 2016 census measured the population of the district as 13,839 inhabitants living in 4,455 households.

=== Administrative divisions ===
Khvoresh Rostam District Population
Administrative Divisions	2006	2011	2016
Khvoresh Rostam-e Jonubi RD	5,775	4,745	4,875
Khvoresh Rostam-e Shomali RD	4,284	3,458	3,239
Hashjin (city)	4,518	4,578	5,725
Total	14,577	12,781	13,839
RD = Rural District

== See also ==
- Alborz (Elburz) mountain range topics
