= Khalkhal County =

County in Ardabil province, Iran

Khalkhal County Persian: شهرستان خلخال
- County
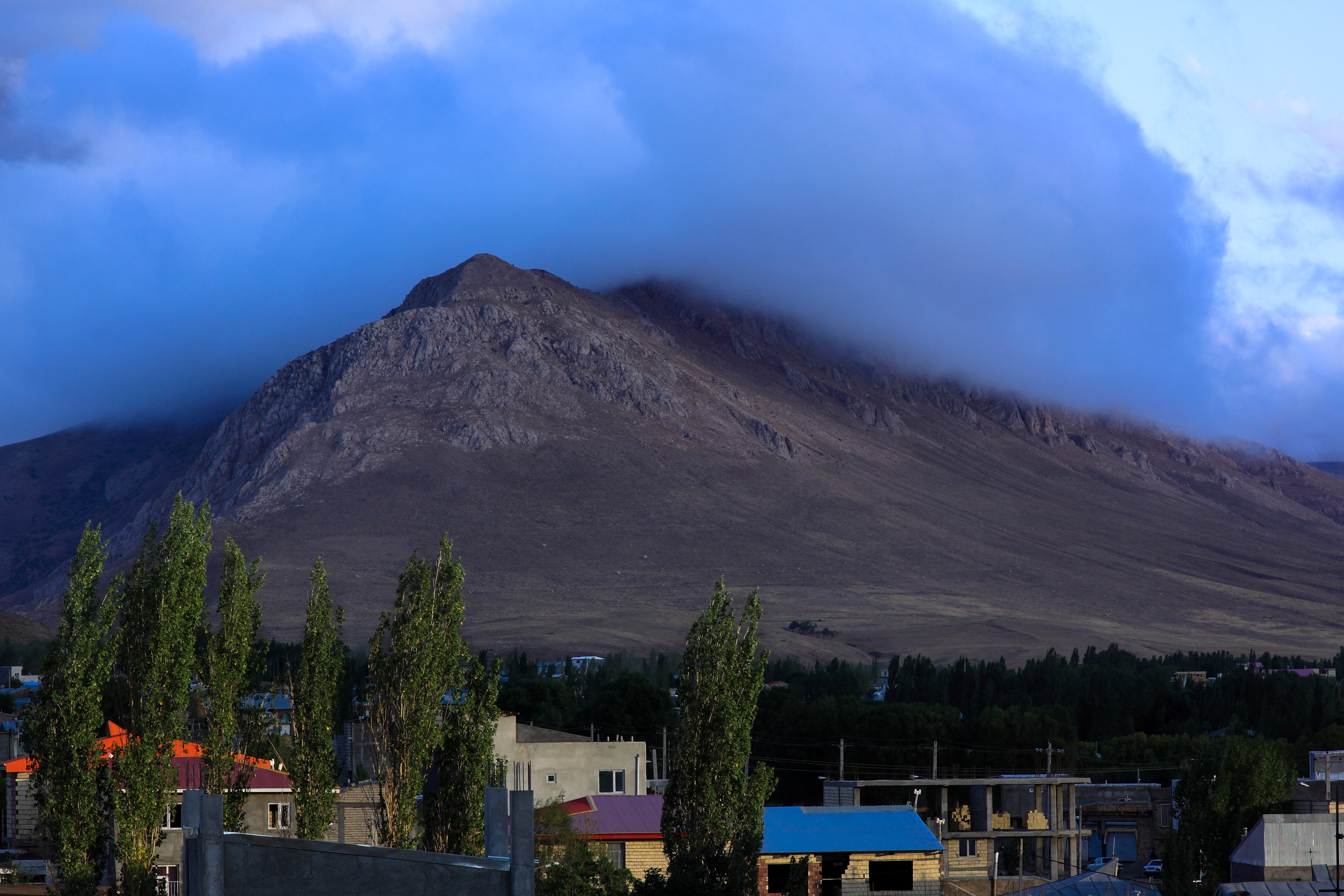
- Khalkhal

- Location of Khalkhal County in Ardabil province (bottom, pink)

- Location of Ardabil province in Iran
- Coordinates: 37°30′N 48°32′E
- Country: Iran
- Province: Ardabil
- Capital: Khalkhal
- Districts: Central, Khvoresh Rostam, Shahrud

Area
  - Total: 2,804 km^{2} (1,083 sq mi)
- Elevation: 1,843 m (6,047 ft)

Population (2016)
  - Total: 86,731
  - Density: 30.93/km^{2} (80.11/sq mi)
- Time zone: UTC+3:30 (IRST)

Khalkhal County (Persian: شهرستان خلخال) (Note: Azerbaijani: شهرستان خلخال بؤلگه‌سی) is in Ardabil province, Iran. Its capital is the city of Khalkhal.

== Demographics ==
=== Language ===
The majority of Khalkhal County residents are Azerbaijanis, but there are many Tats and Kurds living in the southern areas of the county, especially in Shahrud District and Khvoresh Rostam District.

=== Population ===
At the time of the 2006 National Census, the county's population was 92,315 in 22,969 households. The following census in 2011 counted 92,332 people in 25,763 households. The 2016 census measured the population of the county as 86,731 in 26,779 households.

=== Administrative divisions ===
Khalkhal County's population history and administrative structure over three consecutive censuses are shown in the following table.

Khalkhal County Population
Administrative Divisions	2006	2011	2016
Central District	64,037	66,901	61,122
Khanandabil-e Gharbi RD	5,572	5,550	4,237
Khanandabil-e Sharqi RD	15,102	15,946	14,374
Sanjabad-e Sharqi RD	4,842	4,240	3,207
Khalkhal (city)	38,521	41,165	39,304
Khvoresh Rostam District	14,577	12,781	13,839
Khvoresh Rostam-e Jonubi RD	5,775	4,745	4,875
Khvoresh Rostam-e Shomali RD	4,284	3,458	3,239
Hashjin (city)	4,518	4,578	5,725
Shahrud District	13,701	12,650	11,770
Palanga RD	5,067	5,619	5,000
Shahrud RD	1,864	1,423	1,213
Shal RD	4,390	3,503	3,210
Kolowr (city)	2,380	2,105	2,347
Total	92,315	92,332	86,731
RD = Rural District

== Tourist attractions ==
- Lerd tourist village in Shahrud District
- Sibieh Khani Waterfall in Lerd
- Andabil
- Gilavan
- Neor Lake

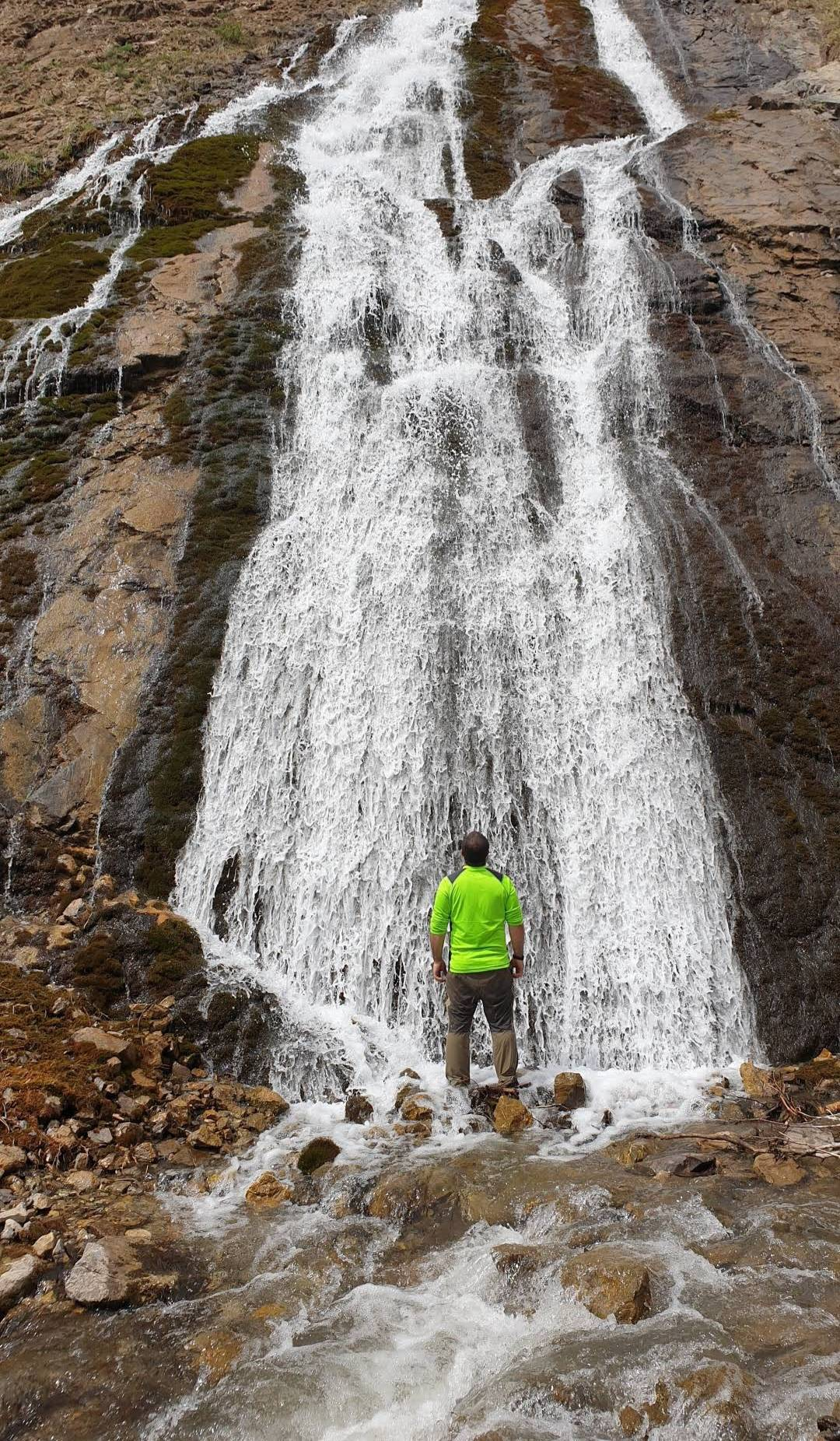
Sibieh Khani waterfall in Lerd tourist village, Khalkhal county is one of the popular tourist destinations in Iran.

== See also ==
Media related to Khalkhal County at Wikimedia Commons
