= Andabil, Ardabil =

Village in Ardabil province, Iran

Andabil Persian: اندبیل
- Village
- Location within Iran
- Coordinates: 37°37′59″N 48°32′49″E
- Country: Iran
- Province: Ardabil
- County: Khalkhal
- District: Central
- Rural District: Khanandabil-e Sharqi

Population (2016)
  - Total: 1,305
- Time zone: UTC+3:30 (IRST)

Andabil (Persian: اندبیل) (Note: Also romanized as Andabīl; also known as Andad) is a village in Khanandabil-e Sharqi Rural District of the Central District in Khalkhal County, Ardabil province, Iran.

== Demographics ==
=== Population ===
At the time of the 2006 National Census, the village's population was 1,400 in 334 households. The following census in 2011 counted 1,541 people in 473 households. The 2016 census measured the population of the village as 1,305 people in 453 households.

== Geography ==
Andabil is on the northeastern outskirts of the city of Khalkhal, along Route 22. It is 1.2 miles from Khalkhal, 2.1 miles from Aliabad, 2.2 miles from Bagh, 2.1 miles from Khujin and 1.4 miles from Khaneqah-e Sadat. Route 22 connects the village to Khalkhal city center to the southwest and to the town of Nav in the northeast, eventually joining the north–south direction Route 49 that connects to Azerbaijan.
