= Tark =

Tark may refer to:

- Tark, East Azerbaijan, a city in East Azerbaijan Province, Iran
- Tark, Ardabil, a village in Ardabil Province, Iran
- Bal Tark, a village in Gilan Province, Iran
- Tark Darreh, a village in West Azerbaijan Province, Iran
- Jerry Tarkanian (1930–2015), American basketball coach nicknamed "Tark"
- Tark (Middle-earth), an orcish word for a Man of Gondor, derived from the elvish word Tarkil (meaning noble man).

== See also ==
- Tork (disambiguation)
