= Owchghaz =

Owchghaz (Persian: اوچغاز), also rendered as Owjghaz or Jigas or Ujqaz or Uchqaz or Yujqaz or Owjiqaz or Ujeghaz or Owjqaz, may refer to:

- Owchghaz-e Olya
- Owchghaz-e Sofla
