= Torc (disambiguation) =

A torc is a large rigid or stiff neck ring in metal, made either as a single piece or from strands twisted together.

Torc or TORC may also refer to:

- Torc Robotics, a robotics company in southwestern Virginia
- Torque, physical quantity
- Truth or Consequences, New Mexico, a town
- TORC: The Off Road Championship, an American off-road racing series
- Torc Waterfall and Torc Mountain, both near Killarney, Ireland.

== See also ==
- Tork (disambiguation)
- Torque (disambiguation)
