= Lameh =

Lameh (Persian: لمه), also rendered as Lyuma and Lumeh, may refer to:

- Lameh Dasht, Ardabil Province
- Lameh Eslam, East Azerbaijan Province
- Lameh-ye Arameneh, East Azerbaijan Province
