= Kalestan =

Kalestan (Persian: كلستان), also rendered as Kialston and Kyalston, may refer to:

- Kalestan-e Olya, village in Iran.
- Kalestan-e Sofla, village in Iran.
