= Fajrabad =

Fajrabad (Persian: فجراباد) may refer to:

- Fajrabad, Ardabil
- Fajrabad, North Khorasan
- Fajrabad, West Azerbaijan
