= Khanandabil =

Khanandabil (Persian: خانندبيل) may refer to:

- Khanandabil-e Gharbi Rural District
- Khanandabil-e Sharqi Rural District
