= Khomos =

Khomos or Khames or Khemes (Persian: خمس) may refer to:

- Khames, Ardabil
- Khomos, Khuzestan
