= Alhashem =

Alhashem or Al Hashem or Al-e Hashem (Persian: ال هاشم), also known as Alishma, may refer to:

- Alhashem-e Olya
- Alhashem-e Sofla
