= Mostafalu =

Mostafalu or Mostafa Loo (Persian: مصطفي لو) may refer to:

- Mostafalu, Ardabil
- Mostafalu, Qazvin
- Mostafalu, Zanjan
