= Navashanaq =

Village in Ardabil province, Iran

Navashanaq Persian: نواشانق
- Village
- Location within Iran
- Coordinates: 37°42′53″N 48°29′49″E
- Country: Iran
- Province: Ardabil
- County: Khalkhal
- District: Central
- Rural District: Sanjabad-e Sharqi

Population (2016)
  - Total: 12
- Time zone: UTC+3:30 (IRST)

Navashanaq (Persian: نواشانق) (Note: Also romanized as Navāshānaq) is a village in Sanjabad-e Sharqi Rural District of the Central District in Khalkhal County, Ardabil province.

== Demographics ==
=== Population ===
At the time of the 2006 National Census, the village's population was 64 in 11 households. The following census in 2011 counted 51 people in 12 households. The 2016 census measured the population of the village as 12 people in five households.
