= Mahmudabad, Khalkhal =

Village in Ardabil province, Iran

Mahmudabad Persian: محموداباد
- Village
- Location within Iran
- Coordinates: 37°29′41″N 48°20′13″E
- Country: Iran
- Province: Ardabil
- County: Khalkhal
- District: Central
- Rural District: Khanandabil-e Gharbi

Population (2016)
  - Total: 52
- Time zone: UTC+3:30 (IRST)

Mahmudabad (Persian: محموداباد) (Note: Also romanized as Maḩmūdābād) is a village in Khanandabil-e Gharbi Rural District of the Central District in Khalkhal County, Ardabil province, Iran.

== Demographics ==
=== Population ===
At the time of the 2006 National Census, the village's population was 92 in 20 households. The following census in 2011 counted 75 people in 18 households. The 2016 census measured the population of the village as 52 people in 16 households.
