= Towlash =

Village in Ardabil province, Iran

Towlash Persian: طولش
- Village
- Location within Iran
- Coordinates: 37°32′55″N 48°32′37″E
- Country: Iran
- Province: Ardabil
- County: Khalkhal
- District: Central
- Rural District: Khanandabil-e Sharqi

Population (2016)
  - Total: 1,770
- Time zone: UTC+3:30 (IRST)

Towlash (Persian: طولش) (Note: Also romanized as Ţowlash and Ţūlāsh; also known as Tolasht and Tūlmān) is a village in Khanandabil-e Sharqi Rural District of the Central District in Khalkhal County, Ardabil province, Iran.

== Demographics ==
=== Population ===
At the time of the 2006 National Census, the village's population was 1,372 in 306 households. The following census in 2011 counted 1,736 people in 478 households. The 2016 census measured the population of the village as 1,770 people in 530 households.
