= Aghbolagh, Ardabil =

Village in Ardabil province, Iran

Aghbolagh Persian: اغبلاغ
- Village
- Location within Iran
- Coordinates: 37°38′05″N 48°21′39″E
- Country: Iran
- Province: Ardabil
- County: Khalkhal
- District: Central
- Rural District: Khanandabil-e Gharbi

Population (2016)
  - Total: 20
- Time zone: UTC+3:30 (IRST)

Aghbolagh (Persian: اغبلاغ) (Note: Also romanized as Āgh Bolāgh and Āghbolāgh; also known as Ak-Bulagi, Āq Bolāgh, Āq Bolaghī, Āqbolāgh, Āqbolāgh-e Gīvī, and Āqbulāqi) is a village in Khanandabil-e Gharbi Rural District of the Central District in Khalkhal County, Ardabil province, Iran.

== Demographics ==
=== Population ===
At the time of the 2006 National Census, the village's population was 88 in 20 households. The following census in 2011 counted 74 people in 20 households. The 2016 census measured the population of the village as 20 people in five households.
