= Yelujeh =

Village in Ardabil province, Iran

Yelujeh Persian: يلوجه
- Village
- Location within Iran
- Coordinates: 37°36′06″N 48°24′48″E
- Country: Iran
- Province: Ardabil
- County: Khalkhal
- District: Central
- Rural District: Khanandabil-e Gharbi

Population (2016)
  - Total: 271
- Time zone: UTC+3:30 (IRST)

Yelujeh (Persian: يلوجه) (Note: Also romanized as Yellūjeh and Yelūjeh; also known as Hija, Ilidzha, Ilija, Īljeh, and Yelījeh) is a village in Khanandabil-e Gharbi Rural District of the Central District in Khalkhal County, Ardabil province, Iran.

== Demographics ==
=== Population ===
At the time of the 2006 National Census, the village's population was 252 in 55 households. The following census in 2011 counted 262 people in 65 households. The 2016 census measured the population of the village as 271 people in 87 households.
