= Qezel Daraq =

Village in Ardabil province, Iran

Qezel Daraq Persian: قزل درق
- Village
- Location within Iran
- Coordinates: 37°30′12″N 48°26′21″E
- Country: Iran
- Province: Ardabil
- County: Khalkhal
- District: Central
- Rural District: Khanandabil-e Gharbi

Population (2016)
  - Total: 92
- Time zone: UTC+3:30 (IRST)

Qezel Daraq (Persian: قزل درق) (Note: Also known as Kyzyldara, Qezel Darreh, and Qizildara) is a village in Khanandabil-e Gharbi Rural District of the Central District in Khalkhal County, Ardabil province, Iran.

== Demographics ==
=== Population ===
At the time of the 2006 National Census, the village's population was 161 in 41 households. The following census in 2011 counted 159 people in 41 households. The 2016 census measured the population of the village as 92 people in 28 households.
