= Ilvanaq =

Village in Ardabil province, Iran

Ilvanaq Persian: ايلوانق
- Village
- Location within Iran
- Coordinates: 37°42′06″N 48°27′31″E
- Country: Iran
- Province: Ardabil
- County: Khalkhal
- District: Central
- Rural District: Khanandabil-e Sharqi

Population (2016)
  - Total: 166
- Time zone: UTC+3:30 (IRST)

Ilvanaq (Persian: ايلوانق) (Note: Also romanized as Īlvānaq; also known as ‘Eynālābād) is a village in Khanandabil-e Sharqi Rural District of the Central District in Khalkhal County, Ardabil province, Iran.

== Demographics ==
=== Population ===
At the time of the 2006 National Census, the village's population was 259 in 61 households. The following census in 2011 counted 239 people in 56 households. The 2016 census measured the population of the village as 166 people in 59 households.
