= Bafrajerd =

Village in Ardabil province, Iran

Bafrajerd Persian: بفراجرد
- Village
- Location within Iran
- Coordinates: 37°29′40″N 48°33′19″E
- Country: Iran
- Province: Ardabil
- County: Khalkhal
- District: Central
- Rural District: Khanandabil-e Sharqi

Population (2016)
  - Total: 1,138
- Time zone: UTC+3:30 (IRST)

Bafrajerd (Persian: بفراجرد) (Note: Also romanized as Bafrājerd; also known as Varāvard) is a village in Khanandabil-e Sharqi Rural District of the Central District in Khalkhal County, Ardabil province, Iran.

== Demographics ==
=== Population ===
At the time of the 2006 National Census, the village's population was 1,289 in 257 households. The following census in 2011 counted 1,331 people in 355 households. The 2016 census measured the population of the village as 1,138 people in 369 households.
