= Tarzana =

Tarzana may refer to:

- Tarzana, Los Angeles, a neighborhood of Los Angeles, California
- Tarzana, the Wild Girl, Italian: Tarzana, sesso selvaggio, 1969 Italian adventure film written and directed by Guido Malatesta
- Tarzana Kid, 1974 album by American singer-songwriter John Sebastian

== See also ==
- Tarzanaq, a village in Khanandabil-e Gharbi Rural District, in the Central District of Khalkhal County, Ardabil Province, Iran
- Tarzan (disambiguation)
