= Chalambar, Ardabil =

Village in Ardabil province, Iran

Chalambar Persian: چلنبر
- Village
- Location within Iran
- Coordinates: 37°41′44″N 48°29′28″E
- Country: Iran
- Province: Ardabil
- County: Khalkhal
- District: Central
- Rural District: Sanjabad-e Sharqi

Population (2016)
  - Total: 69
- Time zone: UTC+3:30 (IRST)

Chalambar (Persian: چلمبر) (Note: Also known as Chalanbar) is a village in Sanjabad-e Sharqi Rural District of the Central District in Khalkhal County, Ardabil province.

== Demographics ==
=== Population ===
At the time of the 2006 National Census, the village's population was 103 in 25 households. The following census in 2011 counted 72 people in 20 households. The 2016 census measured the population of the village as 69 people in 23 households.
