= Suran, Ardabil =

Village in Ardabil province, Iran

Suran Persian: سوران
- Village
- Location within Iran
- Coordinates: 37°29′46″N 48°18′46″E
- Country: Iran
- Province: Ardabil
- County: Khalkhal
- District: Central
- Rural District: Khanandabil-e Gharbi

Population (2016)
  - Total: 17
- Time zone: UTC+3:30 (IRST)

Suran (Persian: سوران) (Note: Also romanized as Sūrān) is a village in Khanandabil-e Gharbi Rural District of the Central District in Khalkhal County, Ardabil province, Iran.

== Demographics ==
=== Population ===
At the time of the 2006 National Census, the village's population was 29 in 11 households. The following census in 2011 counted 31 people in 16 households. The 2016 census measured the population of the village as 17 people in six households.
