= Gavdul, Ardabil =

Village in Ardabil province, Iran

Gavdul Persian: گاودول
- Village
- Location within Iran
- Coordinates: 37°40′04″N 48°25′59″E
- Country: Iran
- Province: Ardabil
- County: Khalkhal
- District: Central
- Rural District: Khanandabil-e Sharqi

Population (2016)
  - Total: 40
- Time zone: UTC+3:30 (IRST)

Gavdul (Persian: گاودول) (Note: Also romanized as Gāvdūl) is a village in Khanandabil-e Sharqi Rural District of the Central District in Khalkhal County, Ardabil province, Iran.

== Demographics ==
=== Population ===
At the time of the 2006 National Census, the village's population was 100 in 24 households. The following census in 2011 counted 90 people in 25 households. The 2016 census measured the population of the village as 40 people in 13 households.
