= Kahran =

Kahran or Kohran (Persian: كهران) may refer to:

- Kahran, Ardabil
- Kahran, East Azerbaijan

== See also ==
- Kuran (disambiguation)
