= Gezaz =

Village in Ardabil province, Iran

Gezaz Persian: گزاز
- Village
- Location within Iran
- Coordinates: 37°32′22″N 48°22′36″E
- Country: Iran
- Province: Ardabil
- County: Khalkhal
- District: Central
- Rural District: Khanandabil-e Gharbi

Population (2016)
  - Total: 322
- Time zone: UTC+3:30 (IRST)

Gezaz (Persian: گزاز) (Note: Also romanized as Gezāz; also known as Gizas) is a village in, and the capital of, Khanandabil-e Gharbi Rural District in the Central District of Khalkhal County, Ardabil province, Iran.

== Demographics ==
=== Population ===
At the time of the 2006 National Census, the village's population was 357 in 82 households. The following census in 2011 counted 389 people in 118 households. The 2016 census measured the population of the village as 322 people in 96 households.
