= Arsun =

Village in Ardabil province, Iran

Arsun Persian: ارسون
- Village
- Location within Iran
- Coordinates: 37°31′16″N 48°23′27″E
- Country: Iran
- Province: Ardabil
- County: Khalkhal
- District: Central
- Rural District: Khanandabil-e Gharbi

Population (2016)
  - Total: 83
- Time zone: UTC+3:30 (IRST)

Arsun (Persian: ارسون) (Note: Also romanized as Arsown, Arsūn and Ārsūn; also known as Arsin) is a village in Khanandabil-e Gharbi Rural District of the Central District in Khalkhal County, Ardabil province, Iran.

== Demographics ==
=== Population ===
At the time of the 2006 National Census, the village's population was 123 in 35 households. The following census in 2011 counted 116 people in 36 households. The 2016 census measured the population of the village as 83 people in 29 households.
