= Khaneqah-e Bafrajerd =

Village in Ardabil province, Iran

Khaneqah-e Bafrajerd Persian: خانقاه بفراجرد
- Village
- Location within Iran
- Coordinates: 37°32′14″N 48°34′28″E
- Country: Iran
- Province: Ardabil
- County: Khalkhal
- District: Central
- Rural District: Khanandabil-e Sharqi

Population (2016)
  - Total: 729
- Time zone: UTC+3:30 (IRST)

Khaneqah-e Bafrajerd (Persian: خانقاه بفراجرد) (Note: Also romanized as Khāneqāh Bafrājerd and Khāneqāh-e Bafrājerd; also known as Hanaga and Khanaga) is a village in Khanandabil-e Sharqi Rural District of the Central District in Khalkhal County, Ardabil province, Iran.

== Demographics ==
=== Population ===
At the time of the 2006 National Census, the village's population was 893 in 196 households. The following census in 2011 counted 840 people in 238 households. The 2016 census measured the population of the village as 729 people in 216 households.
