= Mezajin =

Village in Ardabil province, Iran

Mezajin Persian: مزجين
- Village
- Location within Iran
- Coordinates: 37°35′24″N 48°28′40″E
- Country: Iran
- Province: Ardabil
- County: Khalkhal
- District: Central
- Rural District: Khanandabil-e Sharqi

Population (2016)
  - Total: 404
- Time zone: UTC+3:30 (IRST)

Mezajin (Persian: مزجين) (Note: Also romanized as Mezajīn; also known as Mazjīnī, Mezahjīn, and Mizin) is a village in Khanandabil-e Sharqi Rural District of the Central District in Khalkhal County, Ardabil province, Iran.

== Demographics ==
=== Population ===
At the time of the 2006 National Census, the village's population was 542 in 124 households. The following census in 2011 counted 487 people in 132 households. The 2016 census measured the population of the village as 404 people in 133 households.
