= Khodaqoli Qeshlaq =

Village in Ardabil province, Iran

Khodaqoli Qeshlaq Persian: خداقلي قشلاق
- Village
- Location within Iran
- Coordinates: 37°44′23″N 48°30′06″E
- Country: Iran
- Province: Ardabil
- County: Khalkhal
- District: Central
- Rural District: Sanjabad-e Sharqi

Population (2016)
  - Total: 13
- Time zone: UTC+3:30 (IRST)

Khodaqoli Qeshlaq (Persian: خداقلي قشلاق) (Note: Also romanized as Khodāqolī Qeshlāq; also known as Khodā ‘Alī Qeshlāq) is a village in Sanjabad-e Sharqi Rural District of the Central District in Khalkhal County, Ardabil province.

== Demographics ==
=== Population ===
At the time of the 2006 National Census, the village's population was 15 in four households. The following census in 2011 counted a population below the reporting threshold. The 2016 census measured the population of the village as 13 people in four households.

== Overview ==
The people of the village came from Azerbaijan about 150 years ago. The language of the village is Turkish-Azerbaijani. Its customs are very similar to the people of Moghan. Khodaqoli Qeshlaq has such champions as Hossein Gholli (Doodu) and Taghi, Hamdi and Khodagoli in very recent times. The mosque is the shrine of the village and towns near and far. The main occupation is agriculture and animal husbandry. Natural and touristic attractions and tourist attractions include Delylik Dash, Kuyil, Kushabulagh, Ardoshidik, Darband and Zirishdik.
