= Tarazuj, Ardabil =

Village in Ardabil province, Iran

Tarazuj Persian: ترازوج
- Village
- Location within Iran
- Coordinates: 37°28′06″N 48°28′06″E
- Country: Iran
- Province: Ardabil
- County: Khalkhal
- District: Central
- Rural District: Khanandabil-e Gharbi

Population (2016)
  - Total: 154
- Time zone: UTC+3:30 (IRST)

Tarazuj (Persian: ترازوج) (Note: Also romanized as Tarāzūj; also known as Tarazi) is a village in Khanandabil-e Gharbi Rural District of the Central District in Khalkhal County, Ardabil province, Iran.

== Demographics ==
=== Population ===
At the time of the 2006 National Census, the village's population was 196 in 50 households. The following census in 2011 counted 180 people in 45 households. The 2016 census measured the population of the village as 154 people in 46 households.
