= Beyraq =

Beyraq (Persian: بيرق) may refer to:

- Beyraq, Ardabil
- Beyraq, East Azerbaijan
