= Murestan =

Village in Ardabil province, Iran

Murestan Persian: مورستان
- Village
- Location within Iran
- Coordinates: 37°45′16″N 48°35′16″E
- Country: Iran
- Province: Ardabil
- County: Khalkhal
- District: Central
- Rural District: Sanjabad-e Sharqi

Population (2016)
  - Total: 135
- Time zone: UTC+3:30 (IRST)

Murestan (Persian: مورستان) (Note: Also romanized as Mūrestān; also known as Mol’ston) is a village in Sanjabad-e Sharqi Rural District of the Central District in Khalkhal County, Ardabil province.

== Demographics ==
=== Population ===
At the time of the 2006 National Census, the village's population was 262 in 47 households. The following census in 2011 counted 198 people in 50 households. The 2016 census measured the population of the village as 135 people in 45 households.
