= Nia Khorram =

Village in Ardabil province, Iran

Nia Khorram Persian: نياخرم
- Village
- Location within Iran
- Coordinates: 37°32′16″N 48°20′59″E
- Country: Iran
- Province: Ardabil
- County: Khalkhal
- District: Central
- Rural District: Khanandabil-e Gharbi

Population (2016)
  - Total: 61
- Time zone: UTC+3:30 (IRST)

Nia Khorram (Persian: نياخرم) (Note: Also romanized as Nīā Khorram) is a village in Khanandabil-e Gharbi Rural District of the Central District in Khalkhal County, Ardabil province, Iran.

== Demographics ==
=== Population ===
At the time of the 2006 National Census, the village's population was 127 in 28 households. The following census in 2011 counted 91 people in 27 households. The 2016 census measured the population of the village as 61 people in 22 households.
