= Aq Bulagh, Ardabil =

Village in Ardabil province, Iran

Aq Bulagh Persian: اق بولاغ
- Village
- Location within Iran
- Coordinates: 37°42′24″N 48°33′08″E
- Country: Iran
- Province: Ardabil
- County: Khalkhal
- District: Central
- Rural District: Sanjabad-e Sharqi

Population (2016)
  - Total: 352
- Time zone: UTC+3:30 (IRST)

Aq Bulagh (Persian: اق بولاغ) (Note: Also romanized as Āq Būlāgh; also known as Āgh Bolāgh, Ak-Bulag, Āq Bolāgh, Āqbolāgh-e Kord, and Āqbulāq) is a village in Sanjabad-e Sharqi Rural District of the Central District in Khalkhal County, Ardabil province.

== Demographics ==
=== Population ===
At the time of the 2006 National Census, the village's population was 559 in 109 households. The following census in 2011 counted 480 people in 109 households. The 2016 census measured the population of the village as 352 people in 90 households.
