= Torque (comics) =

Torque, in comics, may refer to:

- Torque (DC Comics), a DC Comics supervillain
- Torque, three Marvel Comics characters:
  - Torque (Marvel Comics), a Marvel Comics superhero from the MC2 universe and member of X-People
  - Torque, a member of the Twisted Sisters
- Torque, two Valiant Comics characters:
  - Torque, the alias used by John Torkelson, who appeared in Harbinger
  - Torque Magnus, the son of Leeja Clane and Magnus, Robot Fighter

== See also ==
- Torque (disambiguation)
- Torquemada (comics)
