= Peruj =

Village in Ardabil province, Iran

Peruj Persian: پروج
- Village
- Location within Iran
- Coordinates: 37°35′22″N 48°22′23″E
- Country: Iran
- Province: Ardabil
- County: Khalkhal
- District: Central
- Rural District: Khanandabil-e Gharbi

Population (2016)
  - Total: 252
- Time zone: UTC+3:30 (IRST)

Peruj (Persian: پروج) (Note: Also romanized as Perūj; also known as Perūch and Pirik) or Paroch (Persian: پروچ) are Persian pronunciations for the Turkic name (South Azerbijani Turkic: Pirk/پیریک) of a village in Khanandabil-e Gharbi Rural District of the Central District in Khalkhal County, Ardabil province, Iran.

== Demographics ==
=== Population ===
At the time of the 2006 National Census, the village's population was 285 in 74 households. The following census in 2011 counted 301 people in 78 households. The 2016 census measured the population of the village as 252 people in 81 households.
