= Balil =

Balil or Belil (Persian: بليل) may refer to:

- Balil, Ardabil
- Belil, Yazd
