= Guran Sarab =

Village in Ardabil province, Iran

Guran Sarab Persian: گورانسراب
- Village
- Location within Iran
- Coordinates: 37°37′18″N 48°27′49″E
- Country: Iran
- Province: Ardabil
- County: Khalkhal
- District: Central
- Rural District: Khanandabil-e Sharqi

Population (2016)
  - Total: 878
- Time zone: UTC+3:30 (IRST)

Guran Sarab (Persian: گورانسراب) (Note: Also romanized as Gowrānsarāb and Gūrān Sarāb; also known as Kuransura and Kyuransura) is a village in Khanandabil-e Sharqi Rural District of the Central District in Khalkhal County, Ardabil province, Iran.

== Demographics ==
=== Population ===
At the time of the 2006 National Census, the village's population was 947 in 198 households. The following census in 2011 counted 1,005 people in 257 households. The 2016 census measured the population of the village as 878 people in 271 households.
