= Golujeh, Khalkhal =

Village in Ardabil province, Iran

Golujeh Persian: گلوجه
- Village
- Location within Iran
- Coordinates: 37°31′33″N 48°26′34″E
- Country: Iran
- Province: Ardabil
- County: Khalkhal
- District: Central
- Rural District: Khanandabil-e Gharbi

Population (2016)
  - Total: 180
- Time zone: UTC+3:30 (IRST)

Golujeh (Persian: گلوجه) (Note: Also romanized as Gollūjeh and Golūjeh; also known as Kollūjeh, Kuluja, and Kyulyudzha) is a village in Khanandabil-e Gharbi Rural District of the Central District in Khalkhal County, Ardabil province, Iran.

== Demographics ==
=== Population ===
At the time of the 2006 National Census, the village's population was 225 in 52 households. The following census in 2011 counted 231 people in 58 households. The 2016 census measured the population of the village as 180 people in 54 households.
