= Tork =

Tork or Torks may refer to:

== People with the surname Tork ==
- Dave Tork (born 1934), American pole vaulter
- Hanan Tork (born 1975), Egyptian actress and ballerina
- Oskar Tork, Estonian politician
- Peter Tork (1942–2019), American musician and actor, best known as a member of The Monkees

== Places ==
=== Iran ===
- Tork Amir, a village in Lorestan Province
- Tark, East Azerbaijan, a city in East Azerbaijan Province
- Tark, Ardabil, a village in Ardabil Province

== Other uses ==
- Tork Angegh, ancient Armenian masculine deity, also called Torq and Durq/Turq
- Tork: Prehistoric Punk, a 2005 platform video game for the Xbox
- Torkils (also Torks, Cyrillic: торки), Turkic tribe of the Middle Ages
- Tork, brand of away-from-home tissue products made by Essity

== See also ==
- Torc, rigid piece of personal adornment made from twisted metal
- Torc (disambiguation)
- Torque, tendency of a force to rotate an object about an axis
- Torque (disambiguation)
- Tark (disambiguation)
