= Majareh =

Village in Ardabil province, Iran

Majareh Persian: مجره
- Village
- Location within Iran
- Coordinates: 37°34′08″N 48°36′45″E
- Country: Iran
- Province: Ardabil
- County: Khalkhal
- District: Central
- Rural District: Khanandabil-e Sharqi

Population (2016)
  - Total: 1,127
- Time zone: UTC+3:30 (IRST)

Majareh (Persian: مجره) (Note: Also romanized as Majarah and Majreh; also known as Madgera, Madghareh, and Madzhera) is a village in Khanandabil-e Sharqi Rural District of the Central District in Khalkhal County, Ardabil province, Iran.

== Demographics ==
=== Population ===
At the time of the 2006 National Census, the village's population was 1,328 in 325 households. The following census in 2011 counted 1,295 people in 335 households. The 2016 census measured the population of the village as 1,127 people in 324 households.
