= Koli, Ardabil =

Village in Ardabil province, Iran

Koli Persian: كلي
- Village
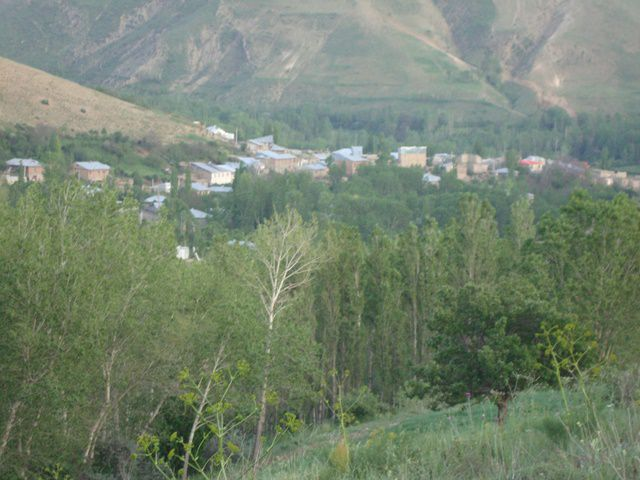

- Location within Iran
- Coordinates: 37°29′25″N 48°29′41″E
- Country: Iran
- Province: Ardabil
- County: Khalkhal
- District: Central
- Rural District: Khanandabil-e Gharbi

Population (2016)
  - Total: 312
- Time zone: UTC+3:30 (IRST)

Koli (Persian: كلي) (Note: Also romanized as Kolī; also known as Golī) is a village in Khanandabil-e Gharbi Rural District of the Central District in Khalkhal County, Ardabil province, Iran.

== Demographics ==
=== Population ===
At the time of the 2006 National Census, the village's population was 518 in 134 households. The following census in 2011 counted 437 people in 135 households. The 2016 census measured the population of the village as 312 people in 115 households.
