= Anaviz =

Village in Ardabil province, Iran

Anaviz Persian: اناويز
- Village
- Location within Iran
- Coordinates: 37°40′41″N 48°28′23″E
- Country: Iran
- Province: Ardabil
- County: Khalkhal
- District: Central
- Rural District: Khanandabil-e Sharqi

Population (2016)
  - Total: 181
- Time zone: UTC+3:30 (IRST)

Anaviz (Persian: اناويز) (Note: Also romanized as Anāvīz) is a village in Khanandabil-e Sharqi Rural District of the Central District in Khalkhal County, Ardabil province, Iran.

== Demographics ==
=== Population ===
At the time of the 2006 National Census, the village's population was 302 in 61 households. The following census in 2011 counted 242 people in 56 households. The 2016 census measured the population of the village as 181 people in 60 households.
