= Susahab =

Village in Ardabil province, Iran

Susahab Persian: سوسهاب
- Village
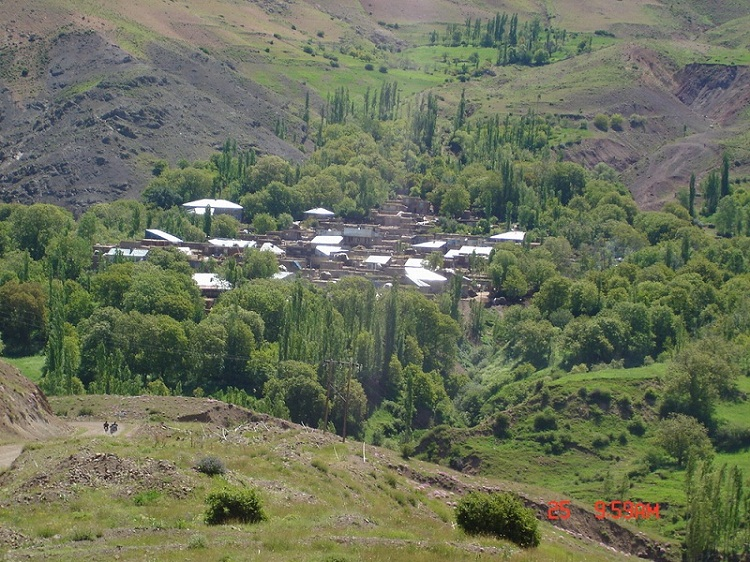
- Susahab Village

- Location within Iran
- Coordinates: 37°25′31″N 48°30′05″E
- Country: Iran
- Province: Ardabil
- County: Khalkhal
- District: Central
- Rural District: Khanandabil-e Gharbi

Population (2016)
  - Total: 434
- Time zone: UTC+3:30 (IRST)
- Area code: 045

Susahab (Persian: سوسهاب) (Note: Also romanized as Soosahab and Sūsahāb; also known as Susagan, Susagap, and Susava) is a village in Khanandabil-e Gharbi Rural District of the Central District in Khalkhal County, Ardabil province, Iran.

== Etymology ==
The village's name is believed to originate from the many springs there, the most important of which are Turkan Bolaghi, Soyuq Bolagh, Dash Bolagh, and Qani Bolagh.

== Demographics ==
=== Population ===
In the 2006 National Census, the village's population was 530 in 126 households. The following census in 2011 counted 552 people in 166 households, while 2016 census recorded 434 people in 151 households.

== Tourist attractions ==
Because of its natural features, Susahab is an important tourist destination. Agh Dagh, Khalkhal's highest mountain at 3,321 meters, is a popular choice for climbing.

== Gallery ==
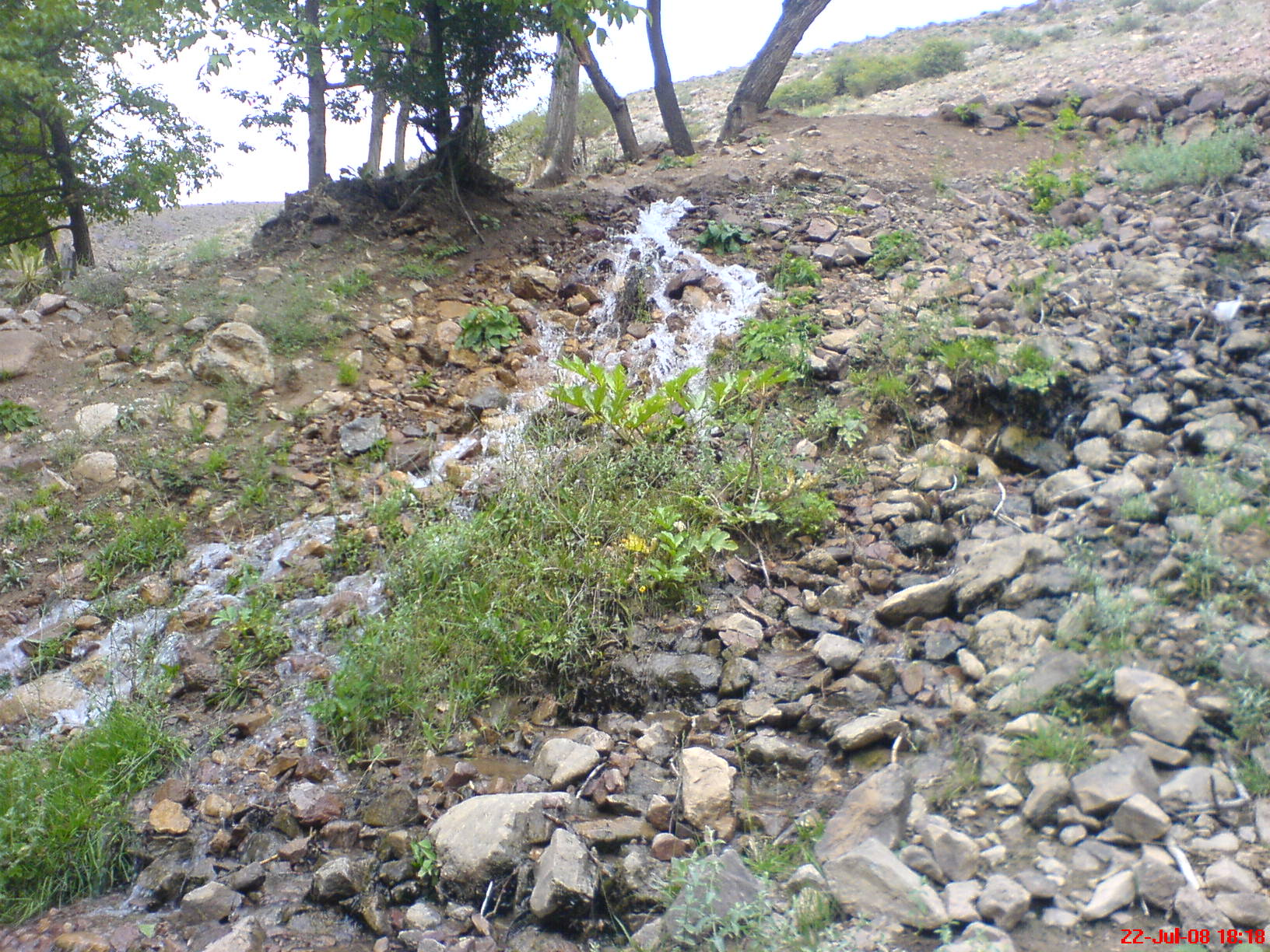

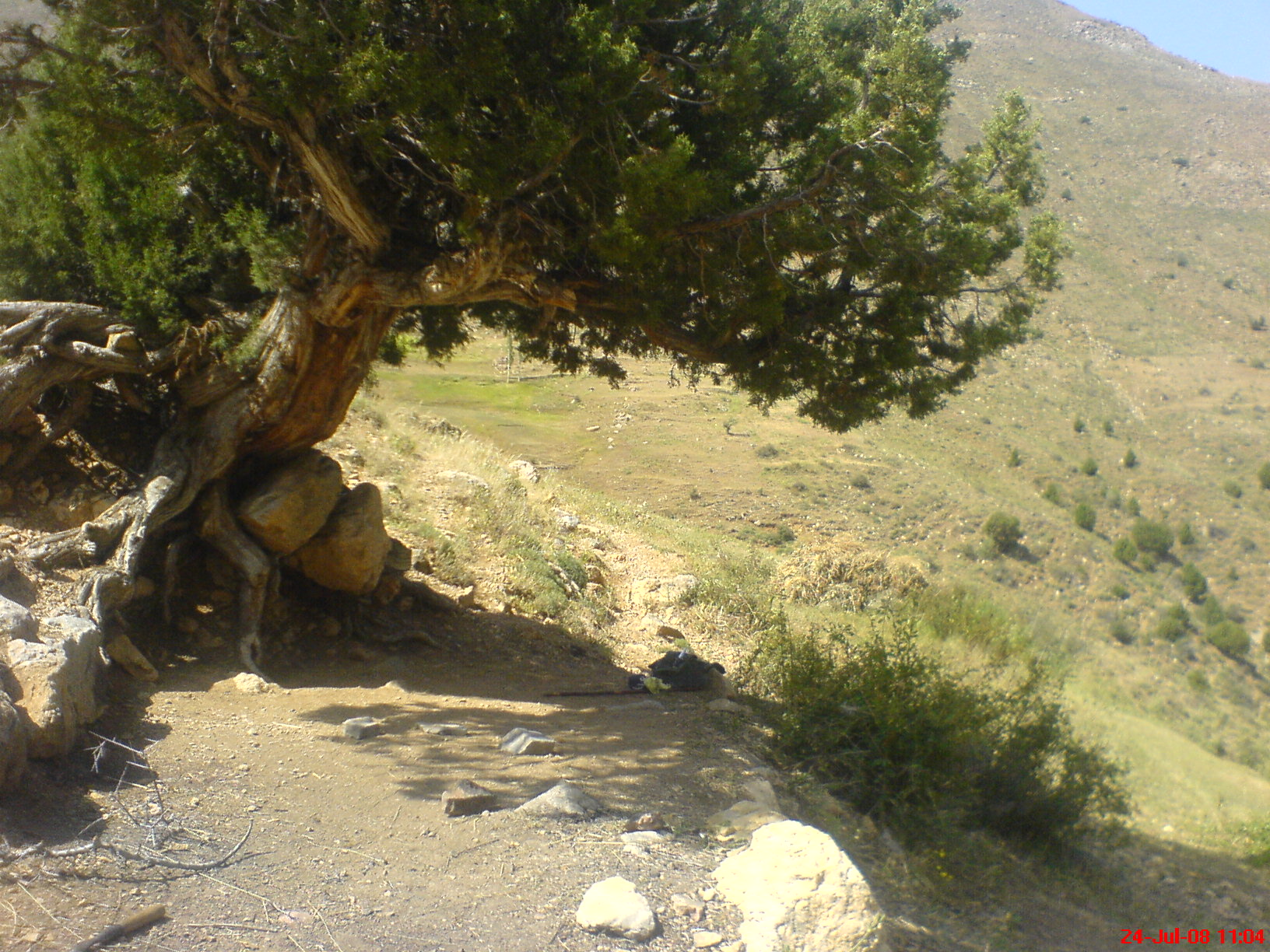

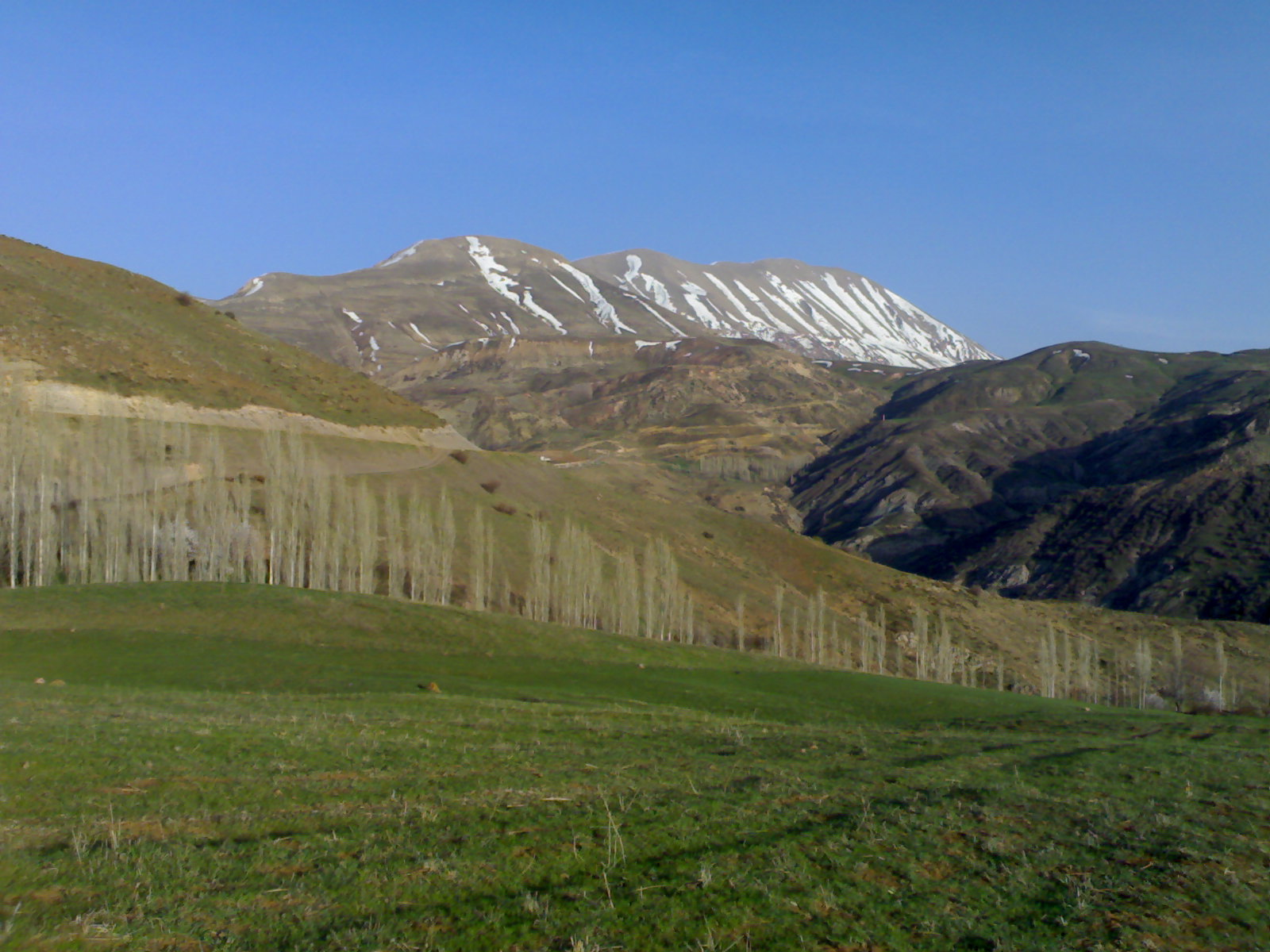

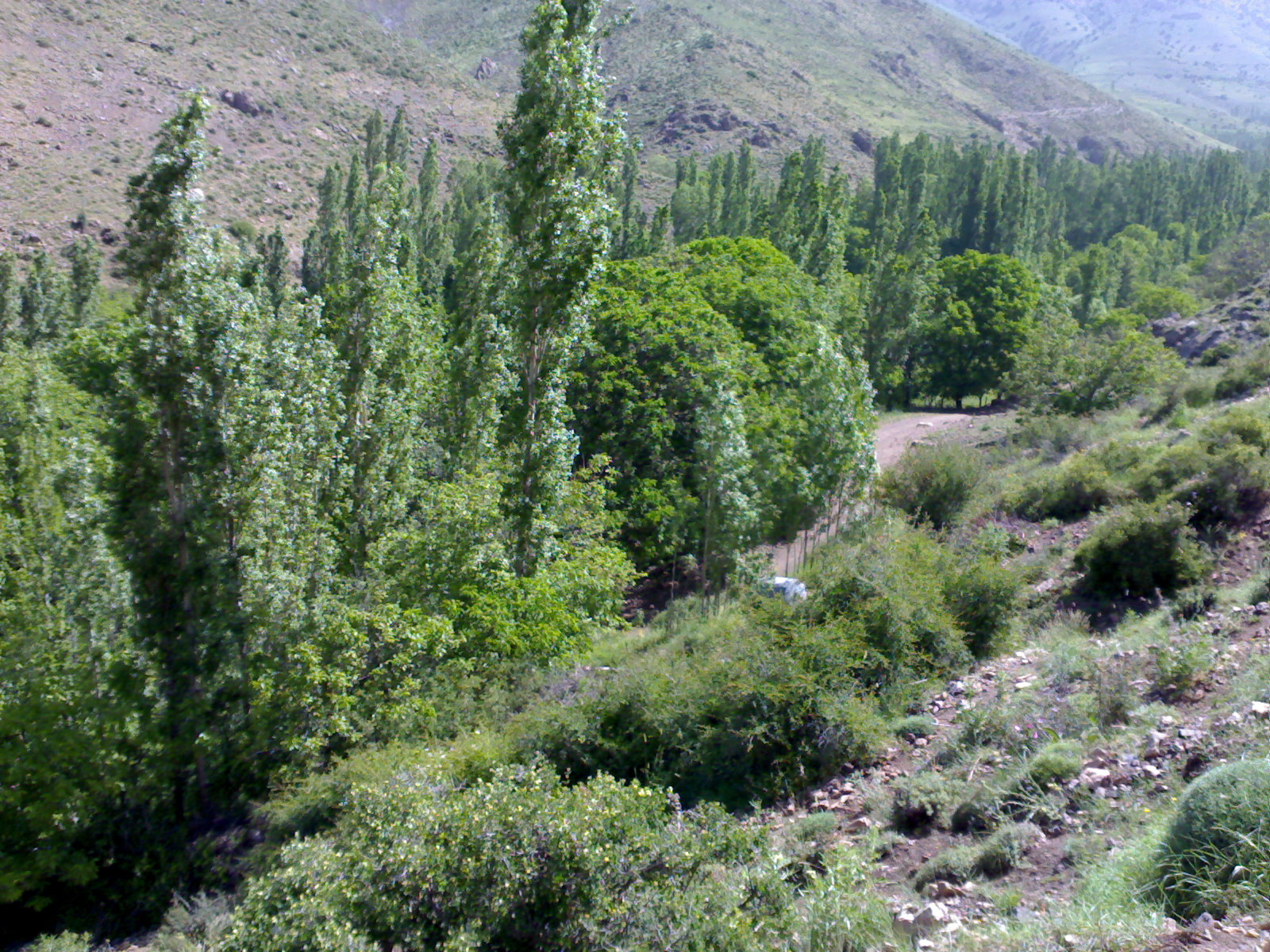

== See also ==
Media related to Susahab at Wikimedia Commons
