= Yuznab =

Village in Ardabil province, Iran

Yuznab Persian: يوزناب
- Village
- Location within Iran
- Coordinates: 37°32′06″N 48°18′26″E
- Country: Iran
- Province: Ardabil
- County: Khalkhal
- District: Central
- Rural District: Khanandabil-e Gharbi

Population (2016)
  - Total: 64
- Time zone: UTC+3:30 (IRST)

Yuznab (Persian: يوزناب) (Note: Also romanized as Yūznāb; also known as Izanap and Īzehnāb) is a village in Khanandabil-e Gharbi Rural District of the Central District in Khalkhal County, Ardabil province, Iran.

== Demographics ==
=== Population ===
At the time of the 2006 National Census, the village's population was 100 in 22 households. The following census in 2011 counted 94 people in 27 households. The 2016 census measured the population of the village as 64 people in 19 households.
