= Kalar, Ardabil =

Village in Ardabil province, Iran

Kalar Persian: كلار
- Village
- Location within Iran
- Coordinates: 37°41′41″N 48°31′29″E
- Country: Iran
- Province: Ardabil
- County: Khalkhal
- District: Central
- Rural District: Sanjabad-e Sharqi

Population (2016)
  - Total: 19
- Time zone: UTC+3:30 (IRST)

Kalar (Persian: كلار) (Note: Also romanized as Kalār; also known as Kal’var and Kolvār) is a village in Sanjabad-e Sharqi Rural District of the Central District in Khalkhal County, Ardabil province.

== Demographics ==
=== Population ===
At the time of the 2006 National Census, the village's population was 65 in 15 households. The following census in 2011 counted 44 people in 12 households. The 2016 census measured the population of the village as 19 people in five households.
