= Mil Aghardan =

Village in Ardabil province, Iran

Mil Aghardan Persian: ميل اغاردان
- Village
- Location within Iran
- Coordinates: 37°48′52″N 48°30′06″E
- Country: Iran
- Province: Ardabil
- County: Khalkhal
- District: Central
- Rural District: Sanjabad-e Sharqi

Population (2016)
  - Total: 23
- Time zone: UTC+3:30 (IRST)

Mil Aghardan (Persian: ميل اغاردان) (Note: Also romanized as Mīl Āghārdān and Mīlāghārdān; also known as Miragarden) is a village in Sanjabad-e Sharqi Rural District of the Central District in Khalkhal County, Ardabil province.

== Demographics ==
=== Population ===
At the time of the 2006 National Census, the village's population was 29 in six households. The following census in 2011 counted 32 people in eight households. The 2016 census measured the population of the village as 23 people in seven households.
