= Lonbar, Ardabil =

Village in Ardabil province, Iran

Lonbar Persian: لنبر
- Village
- Location within Iran
- Coordinates: 37°44′40″N 48°31′19″E
- Country: Iran
- Province: Ardabil
- County: Khalkhal
- District: Central
- Rural District: Sanjabad-e Sharqi

Population (2016)
  - Total: 921
- Time zone: UTC+3:30 (IRST)

Lonbar (Persian: لنبر) is a village about 100 km (62 mi) from the Caspian Sea. In northwestern Iran, it is the capital of Sanjabad-e Sharqi Rural District in the Central District of Khalkhal County, Ardabil province.

== Demographics ==
=== Population ===
At the time of the 2006 National Census, the village's population was 1,498 in 343 households. The following census in 2011 counted 1,309 people in 345 households. The 2016 census measured the population of the village as 921 people in 285 households. It was the most populous village in its rural district.
