= Ghafurabad, Ardabil =

Village in Ardabil province, Iran

Ghafurabad Persian: غفوراباد
- Village
- Location within Iran
- Coordinates: 37°42′17″N 48°32′53″E
- Country: Iran
- Province: Ardabil
- County: Khalkhal
- District: Central
- Rural District: Sanjabad-e Sharqi

Population (2016)
  - Total: 78
- Time zone: UTC+3:30 (IRST)

Ghafurabad (Persian: غفوراباد) (Note: Also romanized as Ghafūrābād) is a village in Sanjabad-e Sharqi Rural District of the Central District in Khalkhal County, Ardabil province.

== Demographics ==
=== Population ===
At the time of the 2006 National Census, the village's population was 98 in 21 households. The following census in 2011 counted 108 people in 26 households. The 2016 census measured the population of the village as 78 people in 20 households.
