= Asmarud =

Village in Ardabil province, Iran

Asmarud Persian: اسمرود
- Village
- Location within Iran
- Coordinates: 37°30′33″N 48°20′04″E
- Country: Iran
- Province: Ardabil
- County: Khalkhal
- District: Central
- Rural District: Khanandabil-e Gharbi

Population (2016)
  - Total: 14
- Time zone: UTC+3:30 (IRST)

Asmarud (Persian: اسمرود) (Note: Also romanized as Asmarūd and Esmrūd) is a village in Khanandabil-e Gharbi Rural District of the Central District in Khalkhal County, Ardabil province, Iran.

== Demographics ==
=== Population ===
At the time of the 2006 National Census, the village's population was 69 in 18 households. The following census in 2011 counted 16 people in six households. The 2016 census measured the population of the village as 14 people in six households.
