= Garm Khaneh =

Village in Ardabil province, Iran

Garm Khaneh Persian: گرمخانه
- Village
- Location within Iran
- Coordinates: 37°32′38″N 48°24′24″E
- Country: Iran
- Province: Ardabil
- County: Khalkhal
- District: Central
- Rural District: Khanandabil-e Gharbi

Population (2016)
  - Total: 121
- Time zone: UTC+3:30 (IRST)

Garm Khaneh (Persian: گرمخانه) (Note: Also romanized as Garm Khāneh and Garmkhāneh; also known as Karmakhan and Qarmakhan) is a village in Khanandabil-e Gharbi Rural District of the Central District in Khalkhal County, Ardabil province, Iran.

== Demographics ==
=== Population ===
At the time of the 2006 National Census, the village's population was 167 in 43 households. The following census in 2011 counted 168 people in 48 households. The 2016 census measured the population of the village as 121 people in 40 households.
