= Tarzanaq =

Village in Ardabil province, Iran

Tarzanaq Persian: ترزنق
- Village
- Location within Iran
- Coordinates: 37°34′04″N 48°26′15″E
- Country: Iran
- Province: Ardabil
- County: Khalkhal
- District: Central
- Rural District: Khanandabil-e Gharbi

Population (2016)
  - Total: 362
- Time zone: UTC+3:30 (IRST)

Tarzanaq (Persian: ترزنق) (Note: Also known as Tarzanagh and Tarzanak) is a village in Khanandabil-e Gharbi Rural District of the Central District in Khalkhal County, Ardabil province, Iran.

== Demographics ==
=== Population ===
At the time of the 2006 National Census, the village's population was 497 in 114 households. The following census in 2011 counted 460 people in 141 households. The 2016 census measured the population of the village as 362 people in 116 households.
