= Balil, Ardabil =

Village in Ardabil province, Iran

Balil Persian: بليل
- Village
- Location within Iran
- Coordinates: 37°35′23″N 48°31′29″E
- Country: Iran
- Province: Ardabil
- County: Khalkhal
- District: Central
- Rural District: Khanandabil-e Sharqi

Population (2016)
  - Total: 220
- Time zone: UTC+3:30 (IRST)

Balil (Persian: بليل) (Note: Also romanized as Balīl; also known as Bīlabīl) is a village in Khanandabil-e Sharqi Rural District of the Central District in Khalkhal County, Ardabil province, Iran.

== Demographics ==
=== Population ===
At the time of the 2006 National Census, the village's population was 238 in 58 households. The following census in 2011 counted 246 people in 69 households. The 2016 census measured the population of the village as 220 people in 77 households.
