= Khames, Ardabil =

Village in Ardabil province, Iran

Khames Persian: خمس
- Village
- Location within Iran
- Coordinates: 37°31′12″N 48°38′18″E
- Country: Iran
- Province: Ardabil
- County: Khalkhal
- District: Central
- Rural District: Khanandabil-e Sharqi

Population (2016)
  - Total: 943
- Time zone: UTC+3:30 (IRST)

Khames (Persian: خمس) (Note: Also romanized as Khemes; also known as Hamis and Khyms) is a village in Khanandabil-e Sharqi Rural District of the Central District in Khalkhal County, Ardabil province, Iran.

== Demographics ==
=== Population ===
At the time of the 2006 National Census, the village's population was 1,051 in 295 households. The following census in 2011 counted 877 people in 282 households. The 2016 census measured the population of the village as 943 people in 325 households.
