= Zartoshtabad =

Village in Ardabil province, Iran

Zartoshtabad Persian: زرتشت اباد
- Village
- Location within Iran
- Coordinates: 37°36′31″N 48°29′41″E
- Country: Iran
- Province: Ardabil
- County: Khalkhal
- District: Central
- Rural District: Khanandabil-e Sharqi

Population (2016)
  - Total: 61
- Time zone: UTC+3:30 (IRST)

Zartoshtabad (Persian: زرتشت اباد) (Note: Also romanized as Zartoshtābād; also known as Āb-e Zarī, Fajrābād, Zardoshtābād, and Zardushabad) is a village in Khanandabil-e Sharqi Rural District of the Central District in Khalkhal County, Ardabil province, Iran.

== Demographics ==
=== Population ===
At the time of the 2006 National Census, the village's population was 63 in 13 households. The following census in 2011 counted 62 people in 14 households. The 2016 census measured the population of the village as 61 people in 16 households.
