= Khujin =

Village in Ardabil province, Iran

Khujin Persian: خوجين
- Village
- Location within Iran
- Coordinates: 37°35′37″N 48°33′08″E
- Country: Iran
- Province: Ardabil
- County: Khalkhal
- District: Central
- Rural District: Khanandabil-e Sharqi

Population (2016)
  - Total: 2,633
- Time zone: UTC+3:30 (IRST)

Khujin (Persian: خوجين) (Note: Also romanized as Khowjīn and Khūjīn) is a village in, and the capital of, Khanandabil-e Sharqi Rural District in the Central District of Khalkhal County, Ardabil province, Iran.

== Demographics ==
=== Population ===
At the time of the 2006 National Census, the village's population was 2,720 in 773 households. The following census in 2011 counted 3,068 people in 871 households. The 2016 census measured the population of the village as 2,633 people in 799 households. It was the most populous village in its rural district.
