= Owchghaz-e Olya =

Village in Ardabil province, Iran

Owchghaz-e Olya Persian: اوچغاز عليا
- Village
- Location within Iran
- Coordinates: 37°47′36″N 48°30′39″E
- Country: Iran
- Province: Ardabil
- County: Khalkhal
- District: Central
- Rural District: Sanjabad-e Sharqi

Population (2016)
  - Total: 761
- Time zone: UTC+3:30 (IRST)

Owchghaz-e Olya (Persian: اوچغازعليا) (Note: Also romanized as Owchghāz-e ‘Olyā; also known as Balūkān, Būlū Kāndī, Owjīqāz-e Bālā, Ūchqāz-e Bālā, Ūjeghāz-e Bālā, Ūjqāz, Ūjqāz-e Bālā, Ūjqāz-e ‘Olyā, Verkhnyaya Dzhigas, and Yūjqāz-e Bālā) is a village in Sanjabad-e Sharqi Rural District of the Central District in Khalkhal County, Ardabil province.

== Demographics ==
=== Population ===
At the time of the 2006 National Census, the village's population was 821 in 175 households. The following census in 2011 counted 886 people in 236 households. The 2016 census measured the population of the village as 761 people in 228 households.
