= Alhashem-e Sofla =

Village in Ardabil province, Iran

Alhashem-e Sofla Persian: ال هاشم سفلي
- Village
- Location within Iran
- Coordinates: 37°32′47″N 48°30′39″E
- Country: Iran
- Province: Ardabil
- County: Khalkhal
- District: Central
- Rural District: Khanandabil-e Sharqi

Population (2016)
  - Total: 281
- Time zone: UTC+3:30 (IRST)

Alhashem-e Sofla (Persian: ال هاشم سفلي) (Note: Also romanized as Āl-e Hāshem-e Soflá and Ālhāshem-e Soflá; also known as Āl Hāshem-e Pā‘īn and Marghzār) is a village in Khanandabil-e Sharqi Rural District of the Central District in Khalkhal County, Ardabil province, Iran.

== Demographics ==
=== Population ===
At the time of the 2006 National Census, the village's population was 320 in 68 households. The following census in 2011 counted 279 people in 77 households. The 2016 census measured the population of the village as 281 people in 89 households.
