= Mangerton Mountain =

Mountain in Killarney, Ireland

Mangerton (and Mangerton Mountain Group)
- An Mhangarta
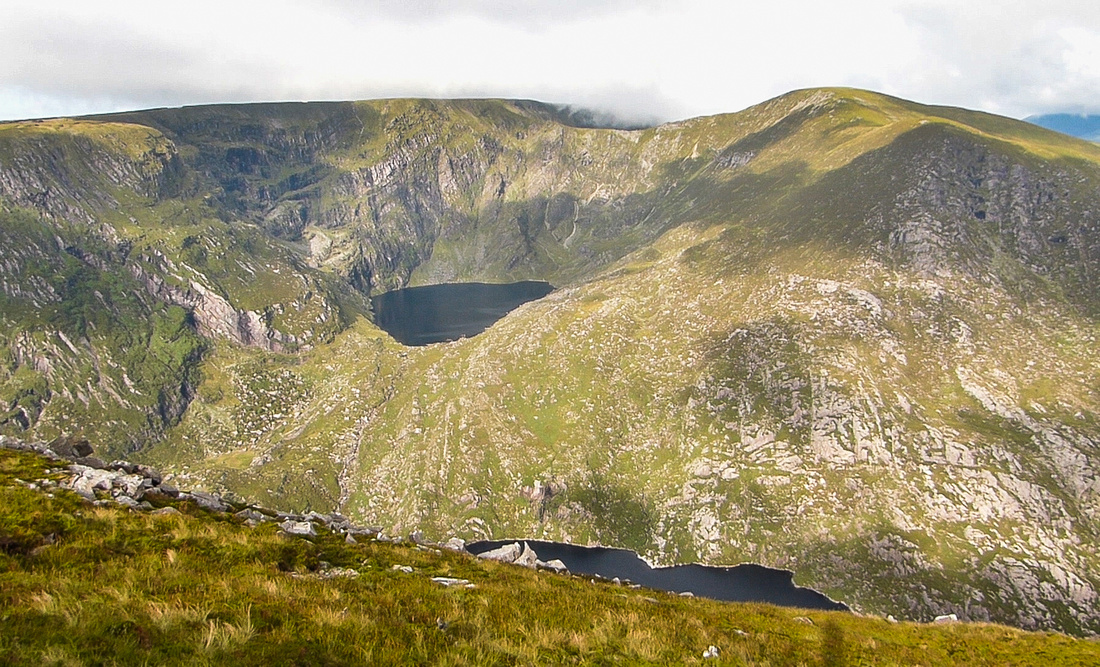
- Mangerton (c) with the hanging lake of Lough Erhogh (c) and Mangerton North Top (r)

Highest point
- Elevation: 838.2 m (2,750 ft)
- Prominence: 583 m (1,913 ft)
- Listing: Marilyn, Hewitt, Arderin, Simm, Vandeleur-Lynam
- Coordinates: 51°58′13″N 9°29′04″W

Naming
- English translation: long haired (mountain)
- Language of name: Irish

Geography
- Location within island of Ireland
- Location: County Kerry, Ireland
- Parent range: Mangerton Mountain Group
- OSI/OSNI grid: V980807
- Topo map: OSi Discovery 78

Geology
- Rock age: Devonian
- Mountain type(s): Green sandstone & purple siltstone

Climbing
- Easiest route: Devil's Punchbowl

Mangerton or Mangerton Mountain (Irish: An Mhangarta, meaning 'the long-haired (mountain)'), at 838 metres (2,749 ft), is the 19th-highest peak in Ireland on the Arderin list, and the 26th–highest mountain according to the Vandeleur-Lynam list. Mangerton is the tallest mountain in the Mangerton Mountain Group, also called the Mangerton Mountains or the Mountains of East Kerry, a range that includes five other major mountains that have a height above 2,000 feet (610 m). Mangerton's western slopes lie within the Killarney National Park. On Mangerton's north-western face lies a deep corrie lake called the Devil's Punchbowl, which is a popular scenic destination for hill walkers; although the mountain is often overlooked by walkers due to the proximity of its more scenic and accessible neighbour, Torc Mountain. The far northern slopes of Mangerton was the site of an important 13th-century battle between the Mac Cárthaigh (Gaelic forces), and the FitzGeralds (Norman forces), known as the "Tooreencormick battle site".

== Naming ==
Irish academic Paul Tempan notes in the Irish Hill and Mountain Names database that Mangerton is most likely a translation of Irish: An Mhangarta, meaning "the long-haired". Tempan discussed the possibility that an alternative interpretation of Irish: An Mhangartach may be worth considering, as it could be the noun Irish: mangart with the suffix ach. Tempan notes P. S. Dinneen's Foclóir Gaedhilge agus Béarla—Irish-English Dictionary (1927), defines Irish: mangart as "movement" or "shaking". Thus the adjective (not listed in any dictionary) could mean "moving", "shaking", or "quaking", which could refer to the physical movement of Mangerton bog prevalent on the southern slopes, or could be understood figuratively as meaning "vacillating" or "fickle".

== Geography ==
=== Mangerton ===
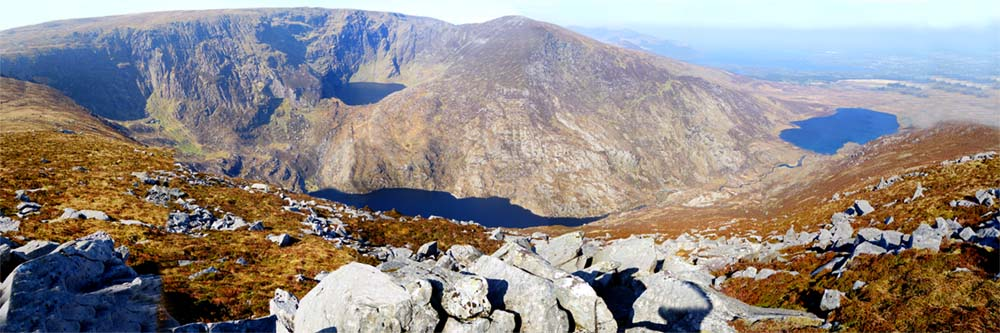
Mangerton Mountain (l), Lough Erhogh (c), and Mangerton North Top (r), seen from across the Horse's Glen from the summit of Stoompa

Mangerton's flat boggy summit plateau includes the satellite summits of Mangerton North Top 782 metres (2,566 ft) and Glencappul Top 700 metres (2,300 ft), and its "horseshoe-shaped" massif includes the summit of Stoompa 705 metres (2,313 ft). The Horses' Glen (or Glencappul), and the Devil's Punchbowl carve deep hollows, or corries on the north-west and north-east sides of Mangerton's massif, but the southern flanks form a huge plateau, one of the most extensive areas of mountain wilderness in Ireland, where herds of red deer and sika deer still roam.

There are three lochs that flow from Managerton's corries into the Horse's Glen (or Glencappul), namely the lowest, Lough Garagarry (Loch Garaigre), the middle, Lough Mannagh (Loch Meáin) and the Lough Erhogh, which is a hanging glacial lake set into a corrie on Mangerton's north-east face.

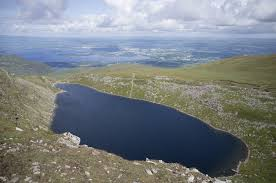
Devil's Punchbowl on the north-west face of Mangerton

The Devil's Punchbowl (Irish: Poll Ifrinn), (Note: The name is associated with a legend regarding the local Chieftain O'Donoghue. Chieftain O'Donoghue Ross dined with the devil on Mangerton. During an argument that developed, the chieftain punched the devil in the face and ran off down the mountain. The devil bit a chunk out of the summit and threw it after him. He missed, and it landed in Muckross Lake to form Devil's Island.) at 670 metres (2,200 ft) on Mangerton's north-west face is a deep oval-shaped corrie filled by a loch in its base that drains into the Owengarriff River from which Torc Waterfall is formed, before finally flowing into the Lakes of Killarney below. Mangerton's western slopes lie within the Killarney National Park.

Mangerton Mountain's height and topographic prominence, qualifies it to meet the British Isles Marilyn classification, as well as the Arderin, Simm and Hewitt classifications. Mangerton Mountain ranks as the 10th-highest mountain in Ireland on the MountainViews Online Database, 100 Highest Irish Mountains, where the prominence threshold is over 100 metres (e.g. higher mountains with sub-100-metre prominences are excluded).

=== Range ===
Surrounding Mangerton are 25 other peaks with an elevation above 100 metres (330 ft) in a range known as the Mangerton Group (or Mangerton Mountains). The range is bounded by the "square" road system surrounding Mangerton, being the N71 to the north and the west side, the N22 to the east side, and the narrow R569 road from Kenmare to the N22 via Kilgarvan on the south side. Most notable are Dromderalough (650 metres (2,130 ft)), and its slightly higher Dromderalough North-East Top (654 metres (2,146 ft)), as well as Crohane (650 metres (2,130 ft)), and Knockbrack (610 metres (2,000 ft)). It also includes the tourist peak of Torc Mountain 535 metres (1,755 ft) in the north-west corner.

== Hill walking ==
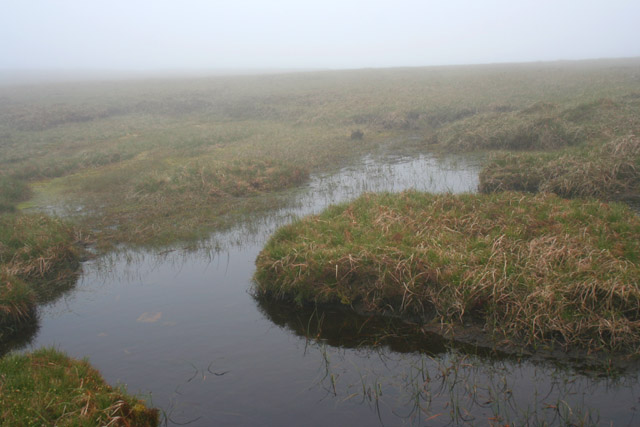
Mangerton's summit plateau

Mangerton's flat boggy summit plateau means that it can get overlooked when guidebooks of Ireland's best walks are compiled, particularly given its proximity to the rocky ridges and summits of the MacGillycuddy's Reeks; sometimes even nearby Torc Mountain is recommended instead. However, Mangerton's scale, summit views and deep corries are well regarded, and its proximity to Killarney town and ease of access are recognised by climbers.

The most direct route to the summit of Mangerton is via the 4–5 hour 10-kilometre (6.2 mi) Devil's Punchbowl Route. It starts from the concrete slab bridge (at V984847), and follows a worn track southwards up to the Devil's Punchbowl at 670 metres (2,200 ft), before reaching the Mangerton summit plateau via the west ridge of the Punchbowl, and then walking circa 300 metres across the plateau to the true summit of Mangerton itself, before returning via the same route (or taking the steeper eastern arete of the Punchbowl). The summit plateau of Mangerton can be difficult to navigate in poor or misty weather as there are few features.

A variation of the Devil's Punchbowl Route is the inclusion of Stoompa, in a 5–6 hour 13.5-kilometre (8.4 mi) route, that can either be done as an extension of the Devil's Punchbowl route (e.g. over and back from Mangerton's summit to Stoopma), or as a "horseshoe" or "loop-route" that starts up the Devil's Punchbowl on the westside but finishes by descending down the northern slopes of Stoompa on the eastside.

== Tooreencormick battle site ==
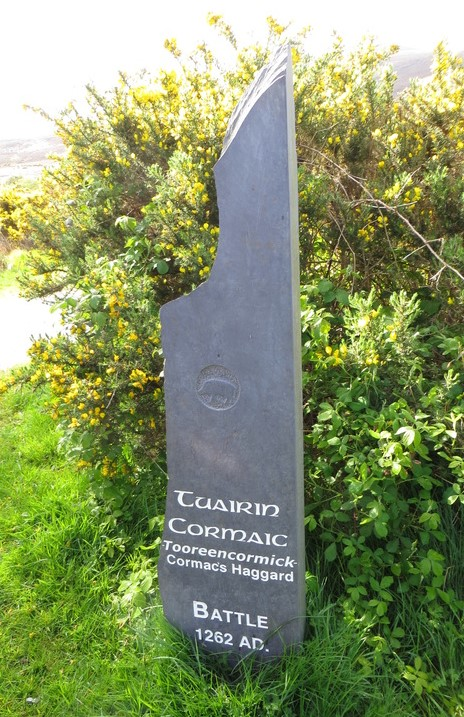
Memorial stone for the 1262 battle site of Tooreencormick

The far northern slope of Mangerton was the site of a battle in 1262 between the Mac Cárthaigh (Gaelic forces, being the Kingdom of Desmond) and the FitzGeralds (Anglo-Norman forces, being the Geraldines), following the rout at the Battle of Callann Glen near Kilgarvan the previous year. The battle site is marked on the ordnance maps and also by a commemorative stone monument, and is known as Tooreencormick (Irish: Tuairín Cormaic, meaning 'little field of Cormac') after Cormac MacCarthy Reagh, who was killed during the clash (his brother Fínghin Mac Carthaigh had been killed at the Battle of Callann). Other notable knights including Gerald Roche, "the third best baron in Erin", were slain at Tooreencormick. Despite the losses, the battle is considered a MacCarthy success as the Anglo-Normans were kept out of South Kerry and West Cork (i.e. the Kingdom of Desmond), for the next three centuries.

In spite of such two-edged victories, the battle of Callann and Tuairin Cormaic, for good or for evil, effectually prevented the establishment of an Anglo-Norman rule in [The Kingdom of] Desmond. It is that owing to dissensions among the Irish tribes the earls of Desmond eventually ' overtopped them all ', but in the region from which they drew their title they had more of the character of a Celtic chief than of a feudal lord, and it was left to the more resolute Tudor statesman and ruthless Tudor generals to break down the clan-system there.

— Henry Orphan, Ireland under the Normans 1169–1216 (1911)

== List of peaks ==
The MountainViews Online Database lists 26 Mangerton Mountain Group peaks more than 100 metres (330 ft) in height.

Marilyn: Any height, and prominence over 150 metres (492 ft)

Peaks of the Mangerton Mountain Group (MountainViews Online Database, December 2018)
Height rank	Prom. rank	Name	Irish name (if different)	Translation	Height (m)	Prom. (m)	Height (ft)	Prom. (ft)	Topo. map	OSI Grid Reference
1	1	Mangerton	An Mhangara	The long-haired	838	583	2,750	1,913	78	V980808
2	12	Mangerton North Top	—	—	782	67	2,566	220	78	V984818
3	11	Stoompa	Stumpa	Stump	705	90	2,313	295	79	W006817
4	25	Glencappul Top	—	Horse's Glen	700	12	2,297	39	78	V991819
5	20	Dromderalough North-East Top (Note: This peak is slightly higher than Dromderalough itself; Previously called Glencappul SE Top in the MountainViews Online Database.)	—	—	654	29	2,146	95	78	V969796
6	2	Crohane	An Cruachán	Little stack (Note: Paul Tempan notes: This peak has the classic hay-stack shape which is typical of mountains whose names in cruach/cruachán. Near Lough Nabroda are some crags with rhyolite formations which, though less spectacular, resemble the organ pipe formations at the Giant's Causeway.)	650	385	2,133	1,263	79	W050829
7	15	Dromderalough	Drom idir Dhá Loch	Ridge between two lakes (Note: Paul Tempan notes: The lakes are more distinctive landmarks than the hills hereabouts. The name is only recorded in English, but probably has the same origin as the townland of Dromdiralough, which is a few kilometres to the NE near Lough Guitane.)	650	45	2,133	148	78	V961790
8	26	Dromderalough North-West Top	—	—	625	12	2,051	39	78	V956792
9	16	Knockbrack	Cnoc Breac	Speckled hill	610	45	2,001	148	78	V953779
10	22	Stoompa East Top	—	—	608	23	1,995	75	79	W018819
11	4	Peakeen Mountain (Note: Paul Tempan notes: There is no Irish given on the Discovery map for this name, although two other peaks are named Péicín, possibly erroneously. Also known as Kilcurrane.)	Péicín	Boundary marker	555	280	1,820	919	78	V903765
12	13	Knockrower	Cnoc Ramhar	Fat hill	554	59	1,818	194	78	V937785
13	10	Peakeen Mountain West Top	—	—	539	93	1,767	305	78	V890765
14	3	Torc Mountain	Sliabh Torc	Mountain of wild boar (Note: Paul Tempan notes: The name of Torc Mountain, like Mount Eagle and the Wolf's Step on the Dingle Peninsula, reminds us of a wild animal once common in the forests of Ireland. Wild boar is significant in Celtic mythology, being depicted on Celtic artefacts found in continental Europe, Ireland and Britain. It represents physical strength and heroic fighting skills.)	535	300	1,755	984	78	V955839
15	23	Peakeen Mountain Far North-West Top	—	—	526	22	1,724	73	78	V888769
16	24	Peakeen Mountain North-West Top	—	—	523	17	1,715	56	78	V889766
17	6	Knockanaguish	Cnoc an Uaignis	Hill of the solitude	509	178	1,670	584	78	V919768
18	8	Derrygarriff	Doire Gharbh (Note: Paul Tempan notes: There is a mapping problem regarding the names of several peaks in this area in that the Irish and English names are not matched up. The Irish version of Derrygarriff is given as Péicín, but this name clearly belongs to Peakeen Mountain. The correct Irish version is Doire Gharbh, which has been assigned (erroneously?) on the 1:25,000 map to the lower peak between Moll's Gap and Lough Barfinnihy.)	Rough (oak) grove	492	128	1,614	420	78	V872774
19	18	Crohane SW Top	—	—	477	32	1,565	105	79	W043821
20	19	Torc Mountain West Top	—	—	470	32	1,542	105	78	V950837
21	7	Bennaunmore (Note: Paul Tempan notes:On the east side an old pilgrimage path leading to Gougane Barra passes some columns of rock similar to "the Organ" at the Giant's Causeway. Bennaunmore is a remnant of an old volcano.)	An Beannán Mór	The big (little) peak	454	149	1,490	489	79	W034819
22	14	Carrigawaddra	Carraig an Mhadra	The dog's rock	425	50	1,394	164	79	W060820
23	17	Foardal	An Fordal	pass gap; wandering (Note: Paul Tempan notes: Foardal is a townland in the parish of Knockane. A pass near here called Mameordile or Mamanordill is a feature on the boundary of the baronies of Glanarought and Dunkerron as described in the Civil Survey of 1654-56. This name seems to be related to Ir. Fordal and appears to refer neither Moll's Gap nor Windy Gap, but to a pass between these two places. If so, it is not a pass which is in use now. This is perhaps unsurprising, given the boggy terrain around the Glas Loughs, and if the name Fordal means 'wandering, going astray', it may indicate that it was never considered a particularly useful route.)	410	36	1,344	118	78	V885781
24	5	Esknabrock	Eisc na mBroc	Ravine of badgers	406	251	1,332	823	79	W027772
25	21	Shaking Rock (Note: Paul Tempan notes: The name refers to a delicately balanced boulder which is near the summit of this peak.)	—	—	402	27	1,319	89	78	V928793
26	9	Inchimore	An Inse Mhór	Big river-meadow	256	100	840	328	78	V922737

== See also ==
- Lists of mountains in Ireland
- List of mountains of the British Isles by height
- List of Marilyns in the British Isles
- List of Hewitt mountains in England, Wales and Ireland
