= Aliabad, Khanandabil-e Sharqi =

Village in Ardabil province, Iran

Aliabad Persian: علی‌آباد
- Village
- Location within Iran
- Coordinates: 37°39′02″N 48°30′49″E
- Country: Iran
- Province: Ardabil
- County: Khalkhal
- District: Central
- Rural District: Khanandabil-e Sharqi

Population (2016)
  - Total: 1,582
- Time zone: UTC+3:30 (IRST)

Aliabad (Persian: علی‌آباد) (Note: Also romanized as ‘Alīābād; also known as Al’var and Ālvār) is a village in Khanandabil-e Sharqi Rural District of the Central District in Khalkhal County, Ardabil province, Iran.

== Demographics ==
=== Population ===
At the time of the 2006 National Census, the village's population was 1,330 in 266 households. The following census in 2011 counted 1,624 people in 392 households. The 2016 census measured the population of the village as 1,582 people in 481 households.
