= Mostafalu, Ardabil =

Village in Ardabil province, Iran

Mostafalu Persian: مصطفي لو
- Village
- Location within Iran
- Coordinates: 37°46′45″N 48°30′56″E
- Country: Iran
- Province: Ardabil
- County: Khalkhal
- District: Central
- Rural District: Sanjabad-e Sharqi

Population (2016)
  - Total: 405
- Time zone: UTC+3:30 (IRST)

Mostafalu (Persian: مصطفي لو) (Note: Also romanized as Moşţafálū and Moşţafālū; also known as Mustafali) is a village in Sanjabad-e Sharqi Rural District of the Central District in Khalkhal County, Ardabil province.

== Demographics ==
=== Population ===
At the time of the 2006 National Census, the village's population was 496 in 91 households. The following census in 2011 counted 477 people in 121 households. The 2016 census measured the population of the village as 405 people in 114 households.
