= Owchghaz-e Sofla =

Village in Ardabil province, Iran

Owchghaz-e Sofla Persian: اوچغازسفلي
- Village
- Location within Iran
- Coordinates: 37°45′33″N 48°30′02″E
- Country: Iran
- Province: Ardabil
- County: Khalkhal
- District: Central
- Rural District: Sanjabad-e Sharqi

Population (2016)
  - Total: 19
- Time zone: UTC+3:30 (IRST)

Owchghaz-e Sofla (Persian: اوچغازسفلي) (Note: Also romanized as Owchghāz-e Soflá; also known as Jigas, Nizhnyaya Dzhigas, Owjīqāz-e Pā’īn, Owjqāz-e Pā’īn, Srednyaya Dzhigas, Ūchqāz, Ūchqāz-e Pā’īn, Ūjeghāz-e Soflá, Ūjqāz, Ūjqāz Pā’īn, Ūjqāz-e Pā’īn, Ūjqāz-e Soflá, Ūjqāz-e Vasaţ, and Yūjqāz-e Pā’īn) is a village in Sanjabad-e Sharqi Rural District of the Central District in Khalkhal County, Ardabil province.

== Demographics ==
=== Population ===
At the time of the 2006 National Census, the village's population was 67 in nine households. The following census in 2011 counted 33 people in seven households. The 2016 census measured the population of the village as 19 people in five households.
