= Kahran, Ardabil =

Village in Ardabil province, Iran

Kahran Persian: كهران
- Village
- Location within Iran
- Coordinates: 37°33′18″N 48°19′47″E
- Country: Iran
- Province: Ardabil
- County: Khalkhal
- District: Central
- Rural District: Khanandabil-e Gharbi

Population (2016)
  - Total: 99
- Time zone: UTC+3:30 (IRST)

Kahran (Persian: كهران) (Note: Also romanized as Kahrān; also known as Kyagran) is a village in Khanandabil-e Gharbi Rural District of the Central District in Khalkhal County, Ardabil province, Iran.

== Demographics ==
=== Population ===
At the time of the 2006 National Census, the village's population was 169 in 35 households. The following census in 2011 counted 127 people in 32 households. The 2016 census measured the population of the village as 99 people in 28 households.
