= Sanjabad-e Sharqi Rural District =

Rural district in Ardabil province, Iran

Sanjabad-e Sharqi Rural District Persian: دهستان سنجبد شرقي
- Rural District
- Location within Iran
- Coordinates: 37°46′N 48°32′E
- Country: Iran
- Province: Ardabil
- County: Khalkhal
- District: Central
- Established: 1987
- Capital: Lonbar

Population (2016)
  - Total: 3,207
- Time zone: UTC+3:30 (IRST)

Sanjabad-e Sharqi Rural District (Persian: دهستان سنجبد شرقي) is in the Central District of Khalkhal County, Ardabil province, Iran. Its capital is the village of Lonbar.

== Demographics ==
=== Population ===
At the time of the 2006 National Census, the rural district's population was 4,842 in 1,054 households. There were 4,240 inhabitants in 1,108 households the following census of 2011. The 2016 census measured the population of the rural district as 3,207 in 973 households. The most populous of its 16 villages was Lonbar, with 921 people.

=== Other villages in the rural district ===
- Aq Bulagh
- Chalambar
- Ghafurabad
- Hajjiabad
- Kalar
- Kalestan-e Olya
- Kalestan-e Sofla
- Khodaqoli Qeshlaq
- Mil Aghardan
- Mostafalu
- Murestan
- Navashanaq
- Owchghaz-e Olya
- Owchghaz-e Sofla
