= Lameh Dasht =

Village in Ardabil province, Iran

Lameh Dasht Persian: لمعه دشت
- Village
- Location within Iran
- Coordinates: 37°36′34″N 48°22′02″E
- Country: Iran
- Province: Ardabil
- County: Khalkhal
- District: Central
- Rural District: Khanandabil-e Gharbi
- Elevation: 1,814 m (5,951 ft)

Population (2016)
  - Total: 977
- Time zone: UTC+3:30 (IRST)

Lameh Dasht (Persian: لمعه دشت) (Note: Also romanized as Lam‘eh Dasht; also known as Lumadasht and Lyumedesht) is a village in Khanandabil-e Gharbi Rural District of the Central District in Khalkhal County, Ardabil province, Iran.

== Demographics ==
=== Population ===
At the time of the 2006 National Census, the village's population was 1,079 in 255 households. The following census in 2011 counted 1,268 people in 347 households. The 2016 census measured the population of the village as 977 people in 310 households. It was the most populous village in its rural district.

== Geography ==
Lameh Dasht is located in a mountainous region at an elevation of 1,814 meters (5,951 ft) above sea level, approximately 12 km northeast of the city of Khalkhal.

== Economy ==
The economy relies on agriculture and livestock farming, typical of Iran's highland villages.

== Transportation ==
The village is connected to Ardabil via Regional Road 335203.
