= Khaneqah-e Sadat =

Village in Ardabil province, Iran

Khaneqah-e Sadat Persian: خانقاه سادات
- Village
- Location within Iran
- Coordinates: 37°37′10″N 48°33′58″E
- Country: Iran
- Province: Ardabil
- County: Khalkhal
- District: Central
- Rural District: Khanandabil-e Sharqi

Population (2016)
  - Total: 303
- Time zone: UTC+3:30 (IRST)

Khaneqah-e Sadat (Persian: خانقاه سادات) (Note: Also romanized as Khāneqāh Sādāt and Khāneqāh-e Sādāt; also known as Khanaya) is a village in Khanandabil-e Sharqi Rural District of the Central District in Khalkhal County, Ardabil province, Iran.

== Demographics ==
=== Population ===
At the time of the 2006 National Census, the village's population was 304 in 70 households. The following census in 2011 counted 386 people in 111 households. The 2016 census measured the population of the village as 303 people in 84 households.
