= Kalestan-e Olya =

Village in Ardabil province, Iran

Kalestan-e Olya Persian: كلستان عليا
- Village
- Location within Iran
- Coordinates: 37°44′38″N 48°34′05″E
- Country: Iran
- Province: Ardabil
- County: Khalkhal
- District: Central
- Rural District: Sanjabad-e Sharqi

Population (2016)
  - Total: 210
- Time zone: UTC+3:30 (IRST)

Kalestan-e Olya (Persian: كلستان عليا) (Note: Also romanized as Kalestān-e ‘Olyā; also known as Golestān-e Bālā, Kalestān, Kialston, and Kyal’ston) is a village in Sanjabad-e Sharqi Rural District of the Central District in Khalkhal County, Ardabil province.

== Demographics ==
=== Population ===
At the time of the 2006 National Census, the village's population was 365 in 98 households. The following census in 2011 counted 264 people in 78 households. The 2016 census measured the population of the village as 210 people in 75 households.
