= Kalestan-e Sofla =

Village in Ardabil province, Iran

Kalestan-e Sofla Persian: كلستان سفلي
- Village
- Location within Iran
- Coordinates: 37°44′23″N 48°32′39″E
- Country: Iran
- Province: Ardabil
- County: Khalkhal
- District: Central
- Rural District: Sanjabad-e Sharqi

Population (2016)
  - Total: 127
- Time zone: UTC+3:30 (IRST)

Kalestan-e Sofla (Persian: كلستان سفلي) (Note: Also romanized as Kalestān-e Soflá; also known as Golestān-e Pā’īn and Kyal’ston) is a village in Sanjabad-e Sharqi Rural District of the Central District in Khalkhal County, Ardabil province.

== Demographics ==
=== Population ===
At the time of the 2006 National Census, the village's population was 261 in 63 households. The following census in 2011 counted 192 people in 58 households. The 2016 census measured the population of the village as 127 people in 44 households.
