= Beyraq, Ardabil =

Village in Ardabil province, Iran

Beyraq Persian: بيرق
- Village
- Location within Iran
- Coordinates: 37°28′56″N 48°25′14″E
- Country: Iran
- Province: Ardabil
- County: Khalkhal
- District: Central
- Rural District: Khanandabil-e Gharbi

Population (2016)
  - Total: 215
- Time zone: UTC+3:30 (IRST)

Beyraq (Persian: بيرق) (Note: Also known as Peirak and Peyrak) is a village in Khanandabil-e Gharbi Rural District of the Central District in Khalkhal County, Ardabil province, Iran.

== Demographics ==
=== Population ===
At the time of the 2006 National Census, the village's population was 332 in 97 households. The following census in 2011 counted 317 people in 98 households. The 2016 census measured the population of the village as 215 people in 79 households.
