= Alhashem-e Olya =

Village in Ardabil province, Iran

Alhashem-e Olya Persian: ال هاشم عليا
- Village
- Location within Iran
- Coordinates: 37°32′40″N 48°29′51″E
- Country: Iran
- Province: Ardabil
- County: Khalkhal
- District: Central
- Rural District: Khanandabil-e Sharqi

Population (2016)
  - Total: 284
- Time zone: UTC+3:30 (IRST)

Alhashem-e Olya (Persian: آل هاشم عليا) (Note: Also romanized as Ālhāshem-e ‘Olyā; also known as Āl Hāshem, Āl-e Hāshem, Āl-e Hāshem-e Bālā, and Alishma) is a village in Khanandabil-e Sharqi Rural District of the Central District in Khalkhal County, Ardabil province, Iran.

== Demographics ==
=== Population ===
At the time of the 2006 National Census, the village's population was 307 in 62 households. The following census in 2011 counted 307 people in 91 households. The 2016 census measured the population of the village as 284 people in 94 households.
