= Fajrabad, West Azerbaijan =

Fajrabad فجراباد
- Village
- Location within Iran
- Coordinates: 37°03′00″N 45°08′00″E
- Country: Iran
- Province: West Azerbaijan
- County: Oshnavieh
- Bakhsh: Central
- Rural District: Oshnavieh-ye Shomali
- Elevation: 1,412 m (4,633 ft)

Population (2006)
  - Total: 349
- Time zone: UTC+3:30 (IRST)
  - Summer (DST): UTC+4:30 (IRDT)

Fajrabad (Persian: فجراباد, also Romanized as Fajrābād; also known as Gorgābād) is a village in Oshnavieh-ye Shomali Rural District, in the Central District of Oshnavieh County, West Azerbaijan Province, Iran. At the time of the 2006 census, its population was 349 people in 60 families.
