= Khanandabil-e Sharqi Rural District =

Rural district in Ardabil province, Iran

Khanandabil-e Sharqi Rural District Persian: دهستان خانندبيل شرقي
- Rural District
- Location within Iran
- Coordinates: 37°35′N 48°33′E
- Country: Iran
- Province: Ardabil
- County: Khalkhal
- District: Central
- Established: 1987
- Capital: Khujin

Population (2016)
  - Total: 14,374
- Time zone: UTC+3:30 (IRST)

Khanandabil-e Sharqi Rural District (Persian: دهستان خانندبيل شرقي) is in the Central District of Khalkhal County, Ardabil province, Iran. Its capital is the village of Khujin.

== Demographics ==
=== Population ===
At the time of the 2006 National Census, the rural district's population was 15,102 in 3,576 households. There were 15,946 inhabitants in 4,400 households at the following census of 2011. The 2016 census measured the population of the rural district as 14,374 in 4,500 households. The most populous of its 24 villages was Khujin, with 2,633 people.

=== Other villages in the rural district ===
- Alhashem-e Olya
- Alhashem-e Sofla
- Aliabad
- Anaviz
- Andabil
- Bafrajerd
- Balil
- Gavdul
- Guran Sarab
- Ilvanaq
- Khames
- Khaneqah-e Bafrajerd
- Khaneqah-e Sadat
- Majareh
- Mezajin
- Towlash
- Zartoshtabad
- Zaviyeh-ye Sadat
