= Lameh Eslam =

Lameh Eslam لمه اسلام
- Village
- Location within Iran
- Coordinates: 38°54′33″N 46°41′59″E
- Country: Iran
- Province: East Azerbaijan
- County: Khoda Afarin
- Bakhsh: Minjavan
- Rural District: Minjavan-e Gharbi

Population (2006)
  - Total: 234
- Time zone: UTC+3:30 (IRST)
  - Summer (DST): UTC+4:30 (IRDT)

Lameh Eslam (Persian: لمه اسلام, also Romanized as Lameh Eslām; also known as Lam‘eh Eslām, Lam‘eh Eslām-e Bālā, Lam‘eh-ye Eslām, Luma, Lūmeh, and Lyuma) is a village in Minjavan-e Gharbi Rural District, Minjavan District, Khoda Afarin County, East Azerbaijan Province, Iran. At the 2006 census, its population was 234, in 36 families.
