= Tark Darreh =

Tark Darreh ترك دره
- Village
- Location within Iran
- Coordinates: 36°30′02″N 46°45′29″E
- Country: Iran
- Province: West Azerbaijan
- County: Shahin Dezh
- Bakhsh: Central
- Rural District: Safa Khaneh

Population (2006)
  - Total: 135
- Time zone: UTC+3:30 (IRST)
  - Summer (DST): UTC+4:30 (IRDT)

Tark Darreh (Persian: ترك دره; also known as Tarkeh Darreh) is a village in Safa Khaneh Rural District, in the Central District of Shahin Dezh County, West Azerbaijan Province, Iran. At the 2006 census, its population was 135, in 25 families.
