= Torc Mountain =

Mountain in Killarney, Ireland

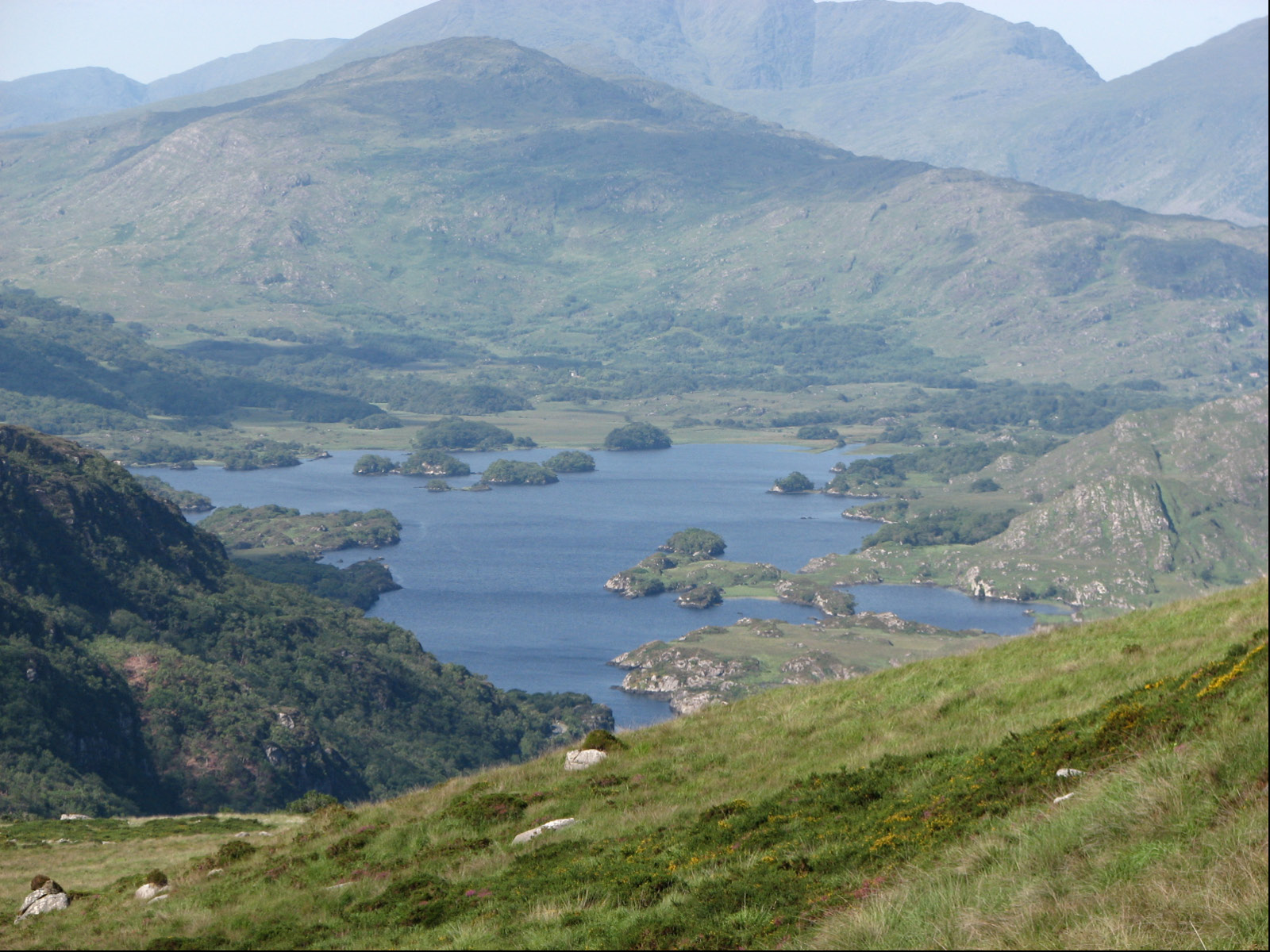
- View from the summit of Torc Mountain looking westwards to the Upper Lake in the Black Valley

Highest point
- Elevation: 535 m (1,755 ft)
- Prominence: 300 m (980 ft)
- Listing: Marilyn, Arderin
- Coordinates: 52°00′0″N 9°31′0″W

Naming
- Native name: Sliabh Torc
- English translation: mountain of wild boar

Geography
- Location within island of Ireland
- Location: County Kerry, Ireland
- Parent range: Mangerton Mountain Group
- OSI/OSNI grid: V955839
- Topo map: OSi Discovery 78

Geology
- Rock age: Devonian
- Mountain type(s): Green sandstone & purple siltstone, (Glenflesk Chloritic Sandstone Formation)

Climbing
- Easiest route: Old Kenmare Road

Torc Mountain (Irish: Sliabh Torc, meaning 'mountain of wild boar'), at 535 metres (1,755 ft), is the 329th–highest peak in Ireland on the Arderin list. It is a popular mountain for hill walkers as it has a stone or boarded path (using railway sleepers) from its base at Torc Waterfall to its summit, which has views of the Lakes of Killarney. Torc Mountain is part of the Mangerton Mountain Group range in County Kerry, Ireland.

== Naming ==
The word Torc comes from the Irish translation of a "wild boar", and the area is associated with legends involving wild boars – Irish academic Paul Tempan notes that: "Wild boar is significant in Celtic mythology, being depicted on Celtic artefacts found in continental Europe, Ireland and Britain; it represents physical strength and heroic fighting skills". One legend is of a man who was cursed by the Devil to spend each night transformed into a wild boar, but when his secret was revealed by a local farmer, he burst into flames and disappeared into the nearby Devil's Punchbowl on Mangerton Mountain from which the Owengarriff River emerged to hide the entrance to his cave beneath the Torc Waterfall. There is also the story of how the legendary Irish warrior, Fionn MacCumhaill, killed a magical boar on Torc mountain with his golden spear.

== Geography ==
Torc Mountain is part of the Mangerton Mountain Group which is a massif to the south of Killarney that includes 26 other named peaks with a height above 100 metres (330 ft). Torc sits in the north-west corner of the massif and immediately west of Torc Mountain is the subsidiary summit of Torc Mountain West Top 470 metres (1,540 ft). Torc's height and prominence, qualifies it on the British Isles Marilyn classification, as well as the Arderin classification.

== Hill walking ==
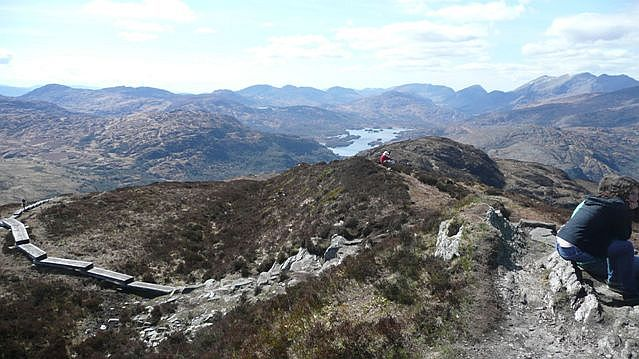
View westwards into the Black Valley, with the wooden railway "sleeper" boardwalk visible at left.

Torc is popular for hill walkers as it can be accessed from a marked stone-step path its base at Torc Waterfall, which then becomes a small road (the Old Kenmare Road) from the top of Torc Waterfall to the mountain itself, and then finishes with a track of wooden railway "sleepers" over the underlying bogland to its summit at 535 metres (1,755 ft). The route can thus be completed without full hiking boots, and requires no special navigational skills.

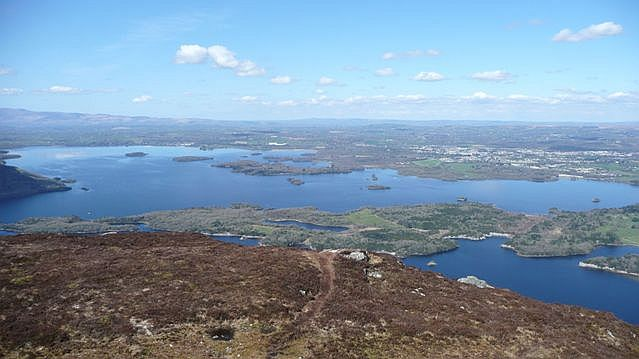
View northwards down to Muckross Lake and Lough Leane.

The summit of Torc has views of the Lakes of Killarney, the Black Valley, the MacGillycuddy's Reeks and Muckross House and grounds. The route from the Torc Waterfall car-park (at V966847), to the summit of Torc Mountain and back is 8–kilometres and takes 3 hours.

Hill walkers can avoid the circa 100 steps of Torc Waterfall and start instead from the upper Torc Waterfall car-park (at 55 metres, V967842), to complete the shorter 7.5–kilometre hour 2.5–hour route to the summit of Torc Mountain, via the Old Kenmare Road, and back to the upper car-park.

The northerly views from the summit of Torc Mountain can be achieved by climbing the steep stone steps up the lower Cardiac Hill, which is half-way up the north facing slopes of Torc Mountain, and which can be accessed from the N71 Road, half a kilometre from the Torc Waterfall car-park.

== Bibliography ==
- Dillion, Paddy (1993). The Mountains of Ireland: A Guide to Walking the Summits. Cicerone. ISBN 978-1852841102.
- Fairbairn, Helen (2014). Ireland's Best Walks: A Walking Guide. Collins Press. ISBN 978-1848892118.
- MountainViews (Simon Stewart) (2013). A Guide to Ireland's Mountain Summits: Vandeleur-Lynams & Arderins. Collins Books. ISBN 978-1-84889-164-7.
- Ryan, Jim (2006). Carrauntoohil and MacGillycuddy's Reeks: A Walking Guide to Ireland's Highest Mountains. Collins Press. ISBN 978-1905172337.

== See also ==
- Lists of mountains in Ireland
- List of mountains of the British Isles by height
- Torc Waterfall
- Mangerton Mountain Group
- The Black Valley
