= Tark, Ardabil =

Village in Ardabil province, Iran

Tark Persian: ترك
- Village
- Location within Iran
- Coordinates: 37°32′29″N 48°25′59″E
- Country: Iran
- Province: Ardabil
- County: Khalkhal
- District: Central
- Rural District: Khanandabil-e Gharbi

Population (2016)
  - Total: 69
- Time zone: UTC+3:30 (IRST)

Tark (Persian: ترك) (Note: Also romanized as Tork; also known as Tarch) is a village in Khanandabil-e Gharbi Rural District of the Central District in Khalkhal County, Ardabil province, Iran.

== Demographics ==
=== Population ===
At the time of the 2006 National Census, the village's population was 112 in 24 households. The following census in 2011 counted 92 people in 24 households. The 2016 census measured the population of the village as 69 people in 21 households.
