= Torc Waterfall =

Waterfall in Killarney, Ireland

- Easach Toirc
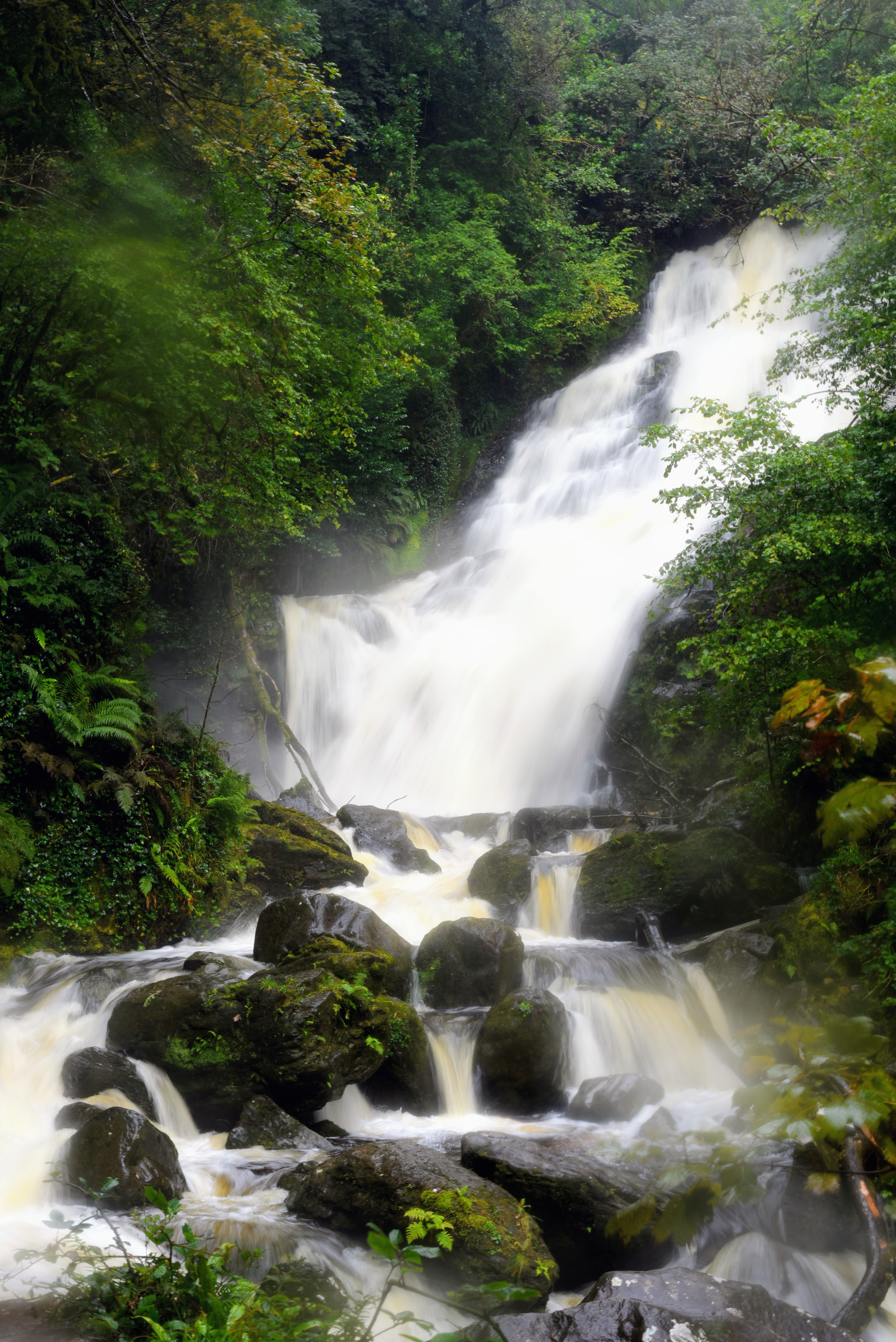
- Torc Waterfall near Killarney
- Interactive map of Torc Waterfall
- Location: Killarney, Ireland
- OSI/OSNI grid: V966847
- Coordinates: 52.005024°N 9.5066471°W
- Type: Cascade
- Elevation: 55 metres (180 ft)
- Total height: 20 metres (66 ft)
- Run: 110 metres (360 ft)
- Watercourse: Owengarriff River

Torc Waterfall (from Irish Easach Toirc, meaning 'cascade of the wild boar') is a 20 metres (66 ft) high, 110 metres (360 ft) long cascade waterfall formed by the Owengarriff River as it drains from the Devil's Punchbowl corrie lake at Mangerton Mountain. The waterfall, which lies at the base of Torc Mountain, in the Killarney National Park, is 4.3 miles (7 kilometres) from Killarney in County Kerry, Ireland. The waterfall is a popular site on the Ring of Kerry and the Kerry Way tours.

== Naming ==
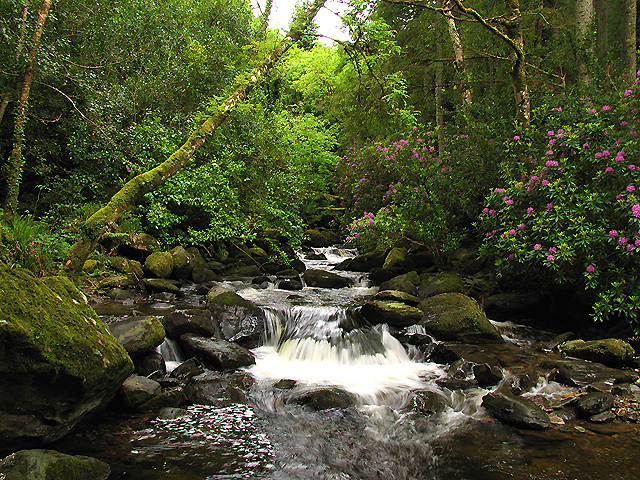
Lower section of Torc Waterfall

The word Torc is from the Irish translation of a "wild boar", and the area is associated with legends involving wild boars. One legend is of a man who was cursed by the Devil to spend each night transformed into a wild boar, but when his secret was revealed by a local farmer, he burst into flames and disappeared into the nearby Devils Punchbowl on Mangerton Mountain from which the Owengarriff River emerged to hide the entrance to his cave beneath the Torc Waterfall. There is also the story of how the legendary Irish warrior, Fionn MacCumhaill, killed a magical boar on Torc mountain with his golden spear. This story is also more frequently attributed to BenBulben mountain.

== Geology ==
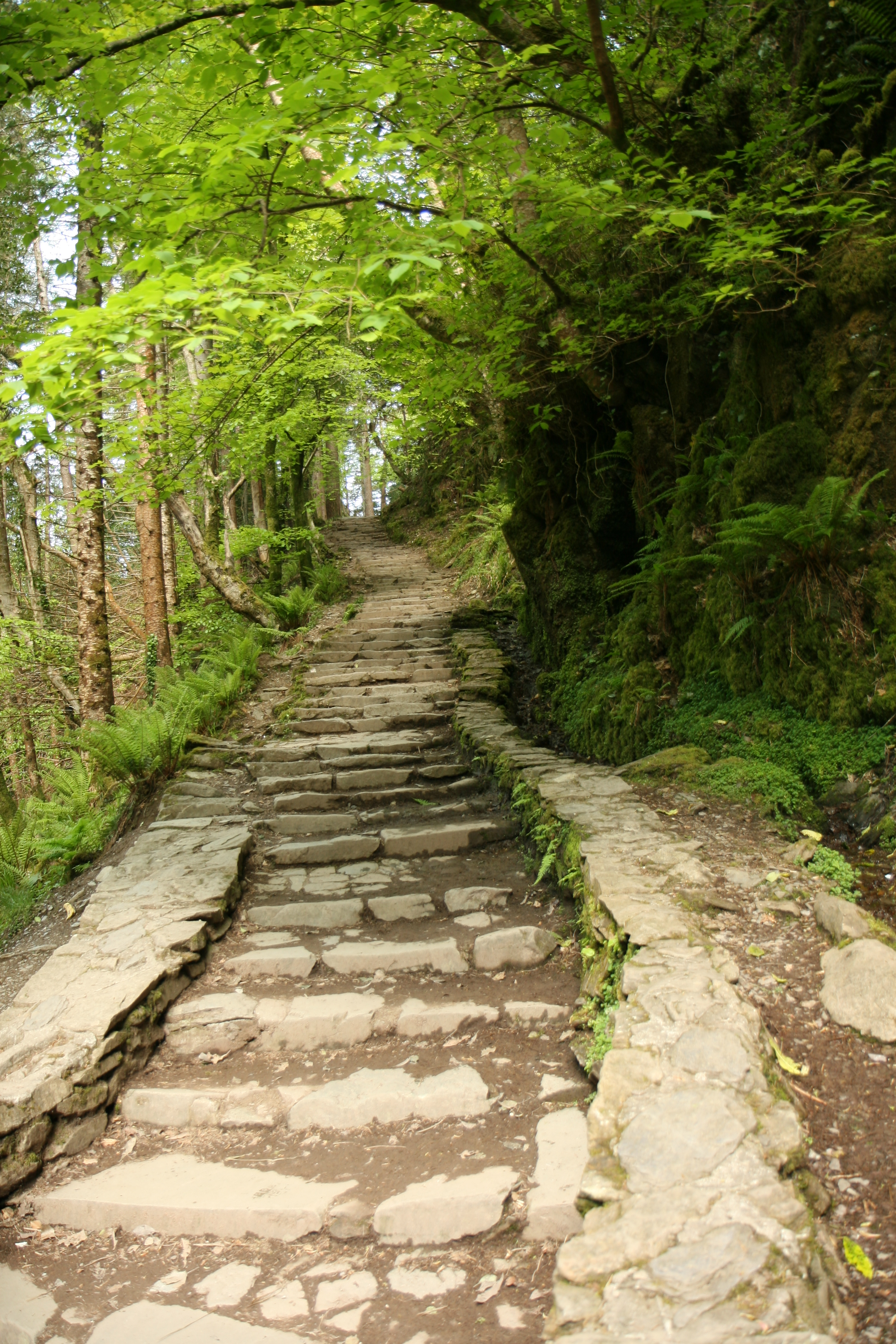
Pathway up the Torc Waterfall

The 20 meters high waterfall is formed by the Owengarriff River as it drains from the Devil's Punchbowl lough, a deep cirque high above in Mangerton Mountain.

Torc Waterfall sits on a geological fault called the Muckross to Millstreet Fault Line. Torc Mountain consists of 400 million-year-old Devonian Old Red Sandstone, but the base around Muckross Lake is circa 100 million years younger and consists of Carboniferous Limestone. At some stage, after the limestone was deposited, a period of tectonic-plate collision occurred and the land under Torc was lifted up 3,000 metres, re-exposing the underlying older sandstone.

== Visiting ==
Torc Waterfall is 4.3 miles (7 kilometres) from Killarney, and 1.6 miles (2.5 kilometres) from the gates of Muckross House, in the Killarney National Park. The cascade is one of the main points on the 200-kilometre (120-mile) Kerry Way walking tour, and a popular stop-off location on the larger Ring of Kerry tour.

The waterfalls are a 200-metre walk from the car park (at V966847) just off the N71 road, and the climb to the top of the waterfalls is by way of a stone path of about a hundred steps (and circa 55 metres in elevation gain), and takes around 30 minutes to complete. Red deer are frequently seen and heard in the area.

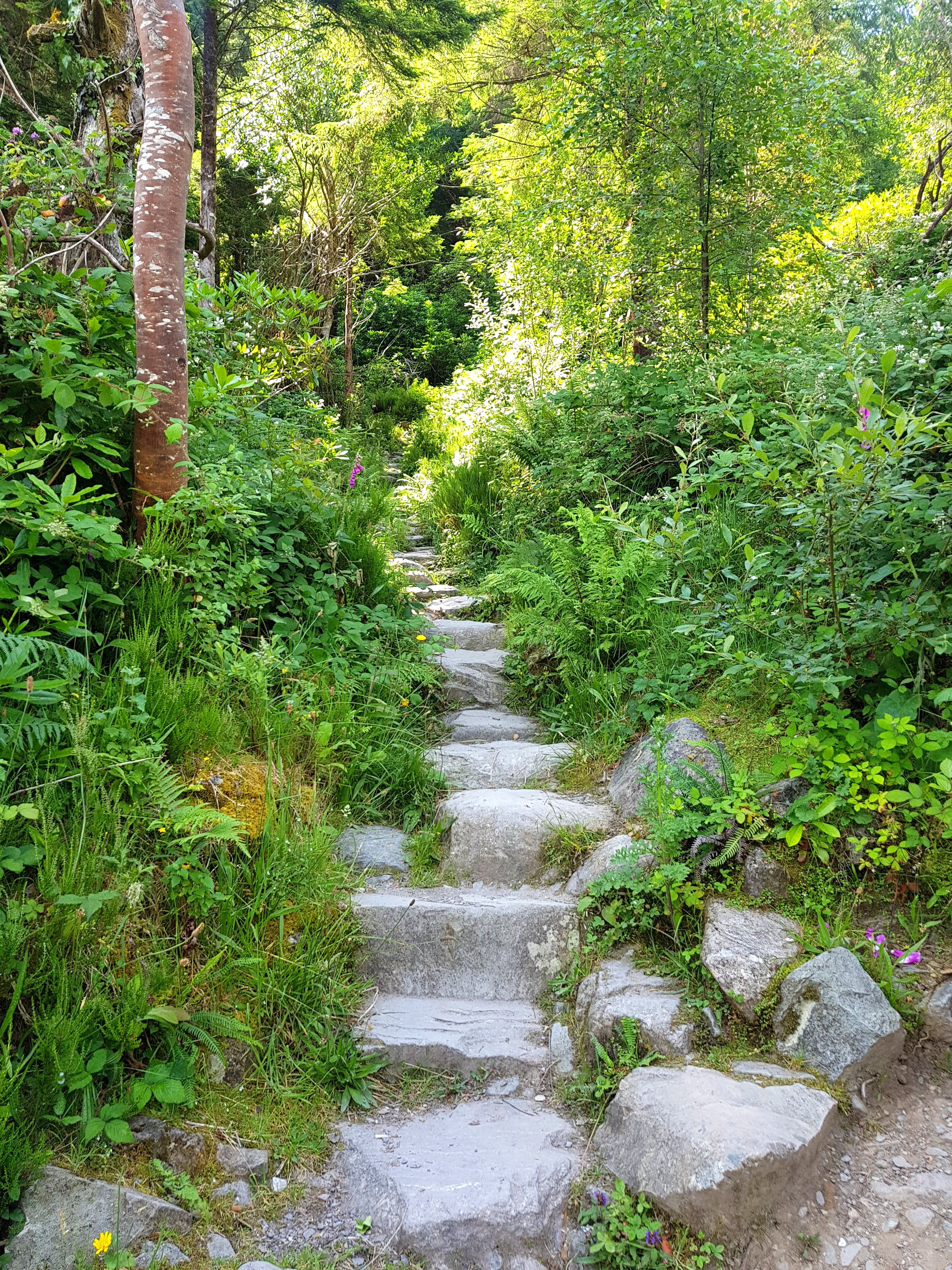
Steps up Cardiac Hill

Killarney National Park has a number of loop-trails around the Torc Waterfall of varying lengths, called the Blue, Yellow and Red Trails. The Red Trail climbs Cardiac Hill (also called Huntsman's Hill or the Cardiac Steps), and involves climbing a very steep series of stone steps (the starting point is half a kilometre west of the waterfall car-park off the N71) to an observation point and stone beehive hut, half-way up Torc Mountain at circa 300 metres (980 ft), giving views of the Lakes of Killarney, and then looping back eastwards to join the Old Kenmare Road and descend via Torc Waterfall.

A marked hiking trail also runs from the waterfall to the top of Torc Mountain 535 metres (1,755 ft) via the Old Kenmare Road, however, hikers can avoid Torc Waterfall and start from the upper car-park above the waterfall (at 55 metres, V967842), to complete the 8–kilometre 3 hour route to the summit of Torc Mountain and back.

== See also ==
- List of waterfalls
- Ladies View
- Moll's Gap
- Black Valley
- Gap of Dunloe
