= Torque (disambiguation) =

In physics and engineering, torque is the tendency of a force to rotate an object.

Torque can also refer to:

== Places ==
- Torque, townland in the civil parish of Newtown, barony of Moycashel, County Westmeath, Ireland

== Arts, entertainment, and media ==
=== Fictional characters ===
- Torque (DC Comics), supervillain
- Torque (Marvel Comics), X-People superhero
- Torque, in the television series A Man Called Sloane
- Torque, in the Freedom Planet video game
- Torque, the protagonist of The Suffering video-game series
- Kamen Rider Torque, Kamen Rider Dragon Knight character

=== Other uses in arts, entertainment, and media ===
- Torque (band), American thrash metal band formed in San Francisco in 1994
- Torque (film), action movie (2004)
- Torque (magazine), monthly motorsport periodical
- Torque, Australian television series about cars, hosted by Peter Wherrett (1970s-80s)

== Technology ==
- Torque (game engine), open-source, cross-platform 3D computer-game engine
- Kyocera Torque, Android smartphone by Kyocera
- Torque, Android application in the Microsoft Garage program
- TORQUE (Terascale Open-source Resource and Queue Manager), open-source, resource & queue managing computer program

== Other uses ==
- Montevideo City Torque, Uruguayan football club
- Torc, or torque, a type of ancient jewelry

== See also ==
- Toque, a type of hat
- Toque (disambiguation)
- Torc (disambiguation)
- Tork (disambiguation)
