= Mostafalu, Qazvin =

Mostafalu مصطفي لو
- Village
- Location within Iran
- Coordinates: 36°33′10″N 49°19′15″E
- Country: Iran
- Province: Qazvin
- County: Qazvin
- Bakhsh: Tarom Sofla
- Rural District: Khandan

Population (2006)
  - Total: 112
- Time zone: UTC+3:30 (IRST)
  - Summer (DST): UTC+4:30 (IRDT)

Mostafalu (Persian: مصطفي لو, also Romanized as Moşţafálū) is a village in Khandan Rural District, Tarom Sofla District, Qazvin County, Qazvin Province, Iran. At the 2006 census, its population was 112, in 30 families.
