= Khomos, Khuzestan =

Khomos خمس
- Village
- Location within Iran
- Coordinates: 30°45′50″N 48°50′59″E
- Country: Iran
- Province: Khuzestan
- County: Shadegan
- Bakhsh: Central
- Rural District: Buzi

Population (2006)
  - Total: 148
- Time zone: UTC+3:30 (IRST)
  - Summer (DST): UTC+4:30 (IRDT)

Khomos (Persian: خمس) is a village in Buzi Rural District, in the Central District of Shadegan County, Khuzestan Province, Iran. At the 2006 census, its population was 148, in 24 families.
