= Khanandabil-e Gharbi Rural District =

Rural district in Ardabil province, Iran

Khanandabil-e Gharbi Rural District Persian: دهستان خانندبيل غربي
- Rural District
- Location within Iran
- Coordinates: 37°34′N 48°25′E
- Country: Iran
- Province: Ardabil
- County: Khalkhal
- District: Central
- Established: 1987
- Capital: Gezaz

Population (2016)
  - Total: 4,237
- Time zone: UTC+3:30 (IRST)

Khanandabil-e Gharbi Rural District (Persian: دهستان خانندبيل غربي) is in the Central District of Khalkhal County, Ardabil province, Iran. Its capital is the village of Gezaz.

== Demographics ==
=== Population ===
At the time of the 2006 National Census, the rural district's population was 5,572 in 1,351 households. There were 5,550 inhabitants in 1,578 households at the following census of 2011. The 2016 census measured the population of the rural district as 4,237 in 1,373 households. The most populous of its 24 villages was Lameh Dasht, with 977 people.

=== Other villages in the rural district ===
- Aghbolagh
- Arsun
- Asmarud
- Beyraq
- Garm Khaneh
- Golujeh
- Kahran
- Koli
- Mahmudabad
- Nia Khorram
- Peruj
- Qezel Daraq
- Suran
- Susahab
- Tarazuj
- Tark
- Tarzanaq
- Varesabad
- Yelujeh
- Yuznab
