= Bal Tark =

Baltork بلترك
- Village
- Location within Iran
- Coordinates: 36°43′24″N 50°21′23″E
- Country: Iran
- Province: Gilan
- County: Rudsar
- Bakhsh: Rahimabad
- Rural District: Siyarastaq Yeylaq

Population (2006)
  - Total: 40
- Time zone: UTC+3:30 (IRST)
  - Summer (DST): UTC+4:30 (IRDT)

Baltork (Persian: بلترك, also Romanized as Bāltork) is a village in Siyarastaq Yeylaq Rural District, Rahimabad District, Rudsar County, Gilan Province, Iran. At the 2006 census, its population was 40, in 20 families.
