= Central District (Khalkhal County) =

District in Ardabil province, Iran

Central District (Khalkhal County) Persian: بخش مرکزی شهرستان خلخال
- District
- Location within Iran
- Coordinates: 37°39′N 48°29′E
- Country: Iran
- Province: Ardabil
- County: Khalkhal
- Capital: Khalkhal

Population (2016)
  - Total: 61,122
- Time zone: UTC+3:30 (IRST)

The Central District of Khalkhal County (Persian: بخش مرکزی شهرستان خلخال) is in Ardabil province, Iran. Its capital is the city of Khalkhal.

== Demographics ==
=== Population ===
At the time of the 2006 National Census, the district's population was 64,037 in 15,600 households. The following census in 2011 counted 66,901 people in 18,299 households. The 2016 census measured the population of the district as 61,122 inhabitants living in 18,347 households.

=== Administrative divisions ===
Central District (Khalkhal County) Population
| Administrative Divisions | 2006 | 2011 | 2016 |
|---|---|---|---|
| Khanandabil-e Gharbi RD | 5,572 | 5,550 | 4,237 |
| Khanandabil-e Sharqi RD | 15,102 | 15,946 | 14,374 |
| Sanjabad-e Sharqi RD | 4,842 | 4,240 | 3,207 |
| Khalkhal (city) | 38,521 | 41,165 | 39,304 |
| Total | 64,037 | 66,901 | 61,122 |
RD = Rural District
