= Tourism in Iran =

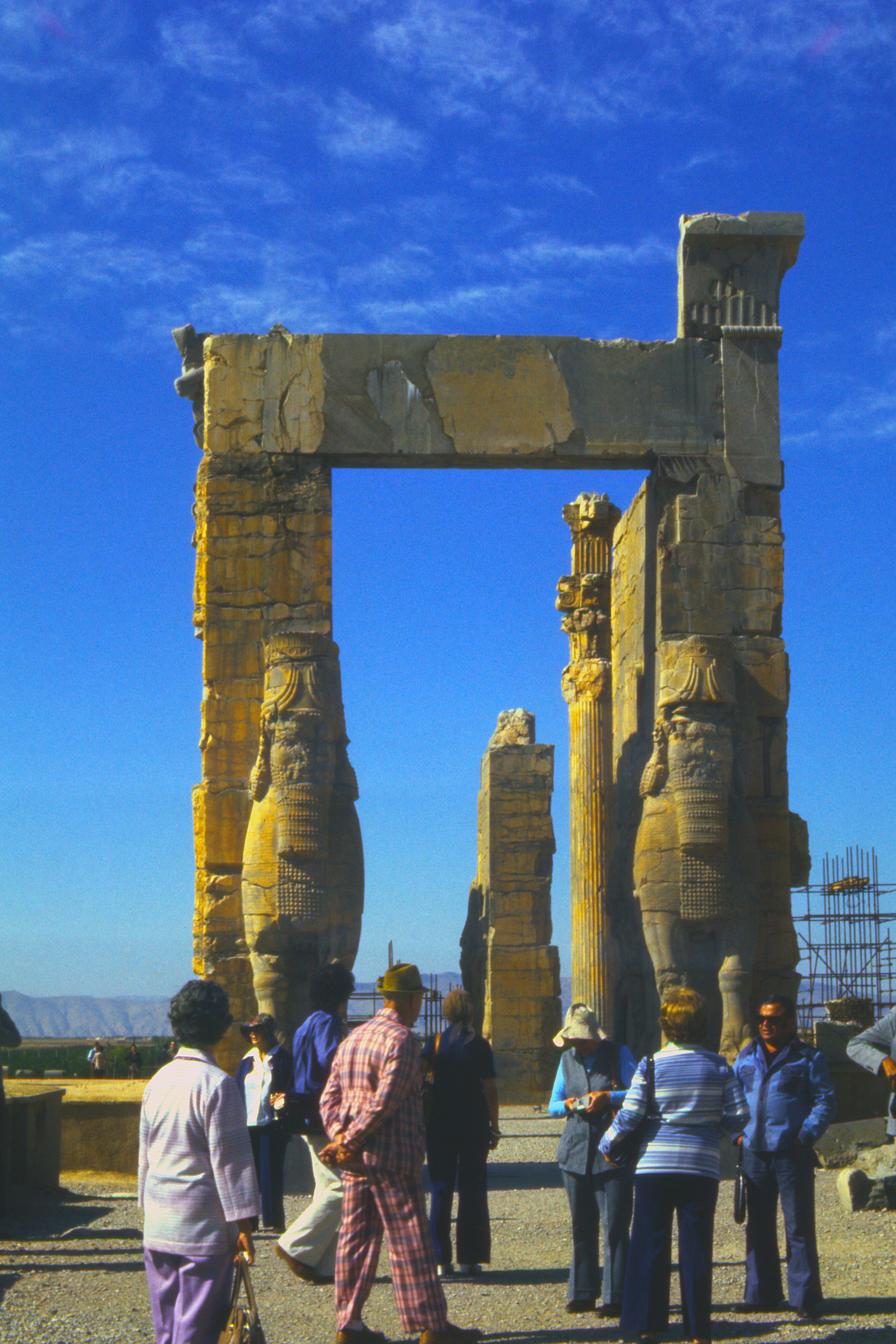
Tourists in Persepolis in 1976

Tourism in Iran is a major sector of the Iranian economy, contributing about 3% to the national GDP in 2023. Over 7 million tourists visited the country in 2024. Major destinations for tourists include the Alborz and Zagros mountains, which provide a range of hiking and skiing opportunities, and beaches on the Persian Gulf and the Caspian Sea. A large percentage of these tourists are from China, Russia, Afghanistan, Pakistan and Iraq.

The international tourism sector is sensitive to political unrest and fluctuates widely year by year. Further problems are the lack of infrastructure ( roads, toilets, and hotels), enforcement of Islamic law (particularly dress codes for women), difficulty in currency conversions, lack of internet, and security concerns.

Iran first attempted to cultivate a major tourist industry under the rule of Shah Mohammad Reza Pahlavi. International tourism sharply decreased after the 1979 Islamic Revolution, and gradually grew in the decades after. After 2023, international tourism to Iran again dropped markedly because of security problems including the detention of foreign nationals in Iran (hostage diplomacy).

The United States Department of State advises westerners not to travel to Iran due to arbitrary arrests made by the Iranian government to induce ransom payments. During times of unrest and conflict, most recently in late 2025 and 2026, the State Department has issued a Level 4 "do not travel" travel advisory for potential visitors, and advised dual nationals to conceal their non-Iranian passports.

== Background ==
Kish Island attracted around 1 million visitors in 2012–13, the majority of whom were Iranian, but the area also attracted non-Iranian Muslims interested in Islamic-style beach holidays where men and women use separate beaches.

Before the Iranian revolution in 1979, tourism was characterized by significant numbers of visitors traveling to Iran for its attractions, including culture and landscape suitable for a range of activities.

Since the revolution, however, a majority of foreign visitors to Iran have been religious pilgrims and business people. In Iran there are many Shi'ite shrines, the two main ones being Imam Reza Shrine in Mashhad and Fatimah al-Ma'sūmah Shrine in Qom. Each year millions of pilgrims from Iran and other Shi'ite countries visit these holy places. Official figures do not distinguish between those traveling to Iran for business and those coming for pleasure, and they also include many diaspora Iranians returning to visit their families in Iran or making pilgrimages to holy Shia sites near Mashhad, Qom and elsewhere.

Tourism declined dramatically during the Iran–Iraq War in the 1980s.

In 2013, the number of foreign tourists in Iran reached 4.76 million, contributing more than US$2 billion to the national economy.

Over five million tourists visited Iran in the fiscal year of 2014–2015, four percent more year-on-year.

According to a report published by World Travel and Tourism Council in 2015, the size of its tourism industry was estimated as having the potential to create jobs for 1,285,500 and rise by 4.1% pa to 1,913,000 jobs in 2025. Based on the report in the year of 2014, travel and tourism directly supported 413,000 jobs (1.8% of total employment). This was expected to rise by 4.4% in 2015 and rise by 4.3% pa to 656,000 jobs (2.2% of total employment) by 2025.

In October 2018, Ali Asghar Moonesan, the head of Iran's Cultural Heritage, Handicrafts and Tourism Organization (ICHTO), announced that the number of tourists who visited Iran in the first six months of the Iranian year (starting March 21) rose by 51 percent compared to the same period in 2017.

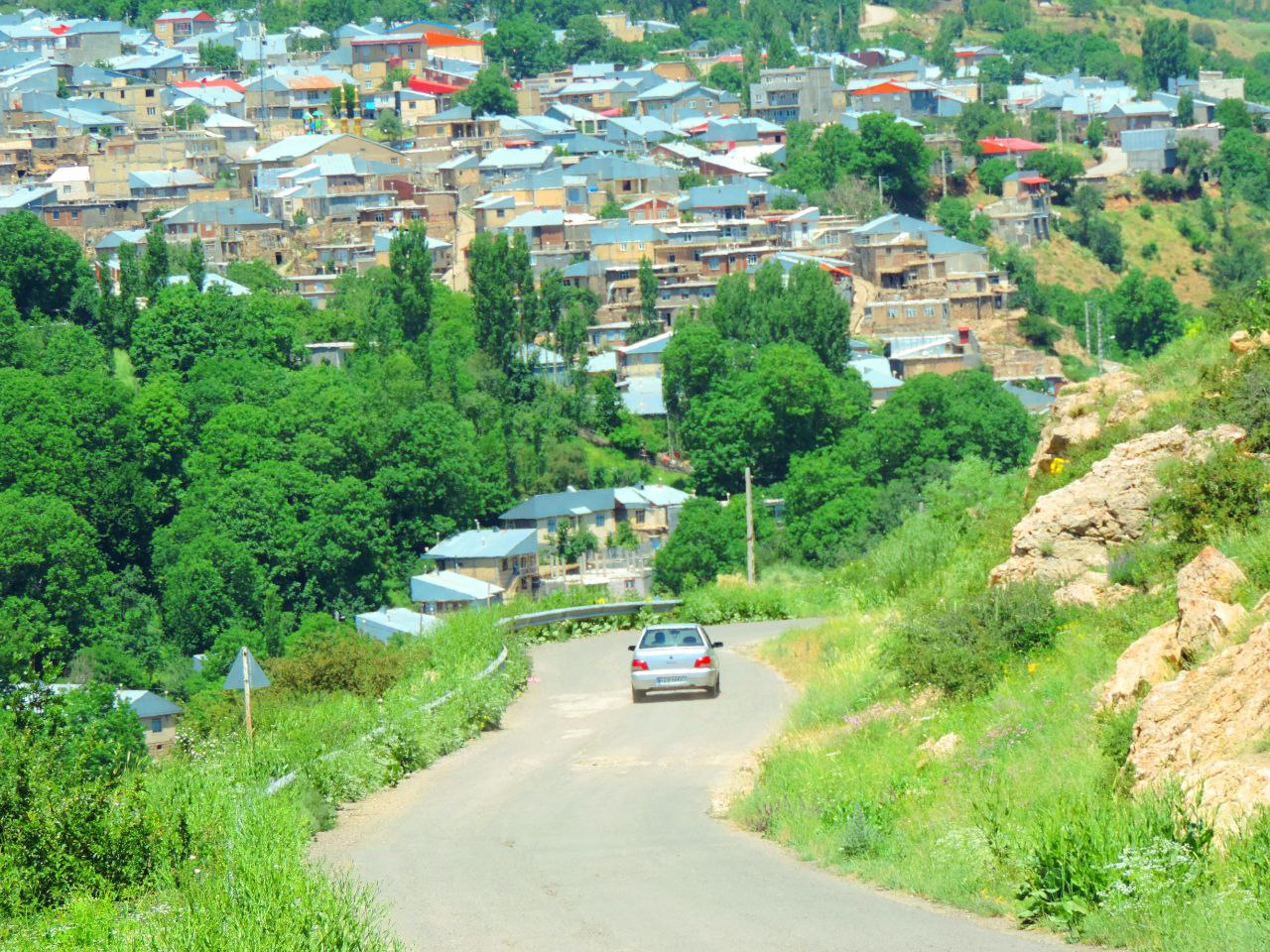
Lerd tourist village in Khalkhal county, Ardabil province

== Foreign visitors ==
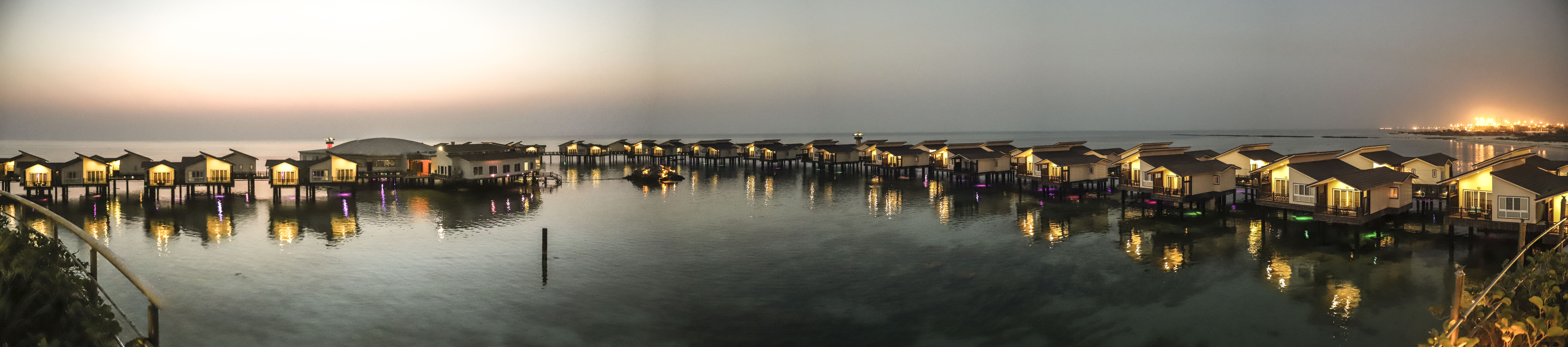
Kish Island

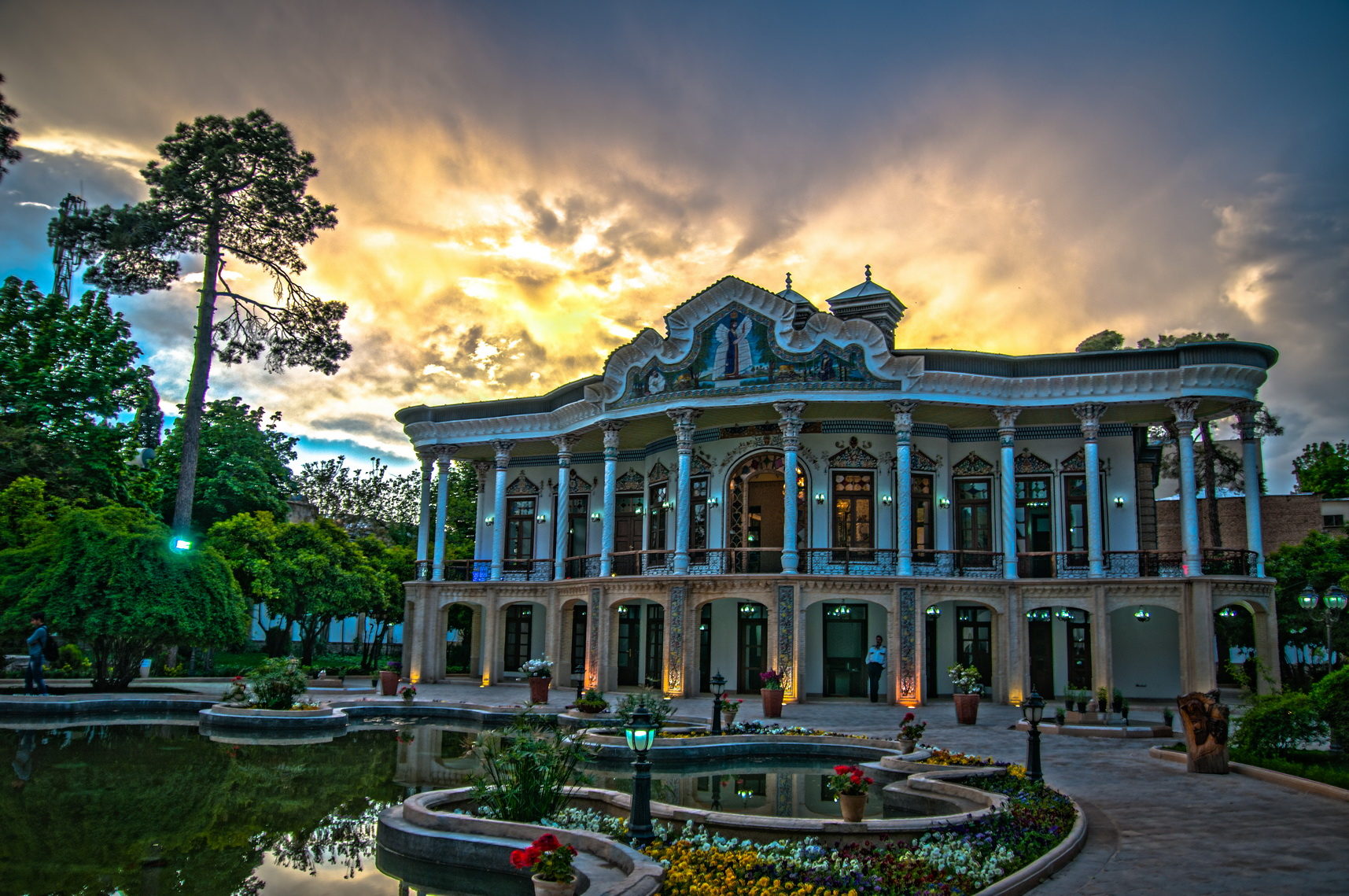
Shapouri House, Shiraz

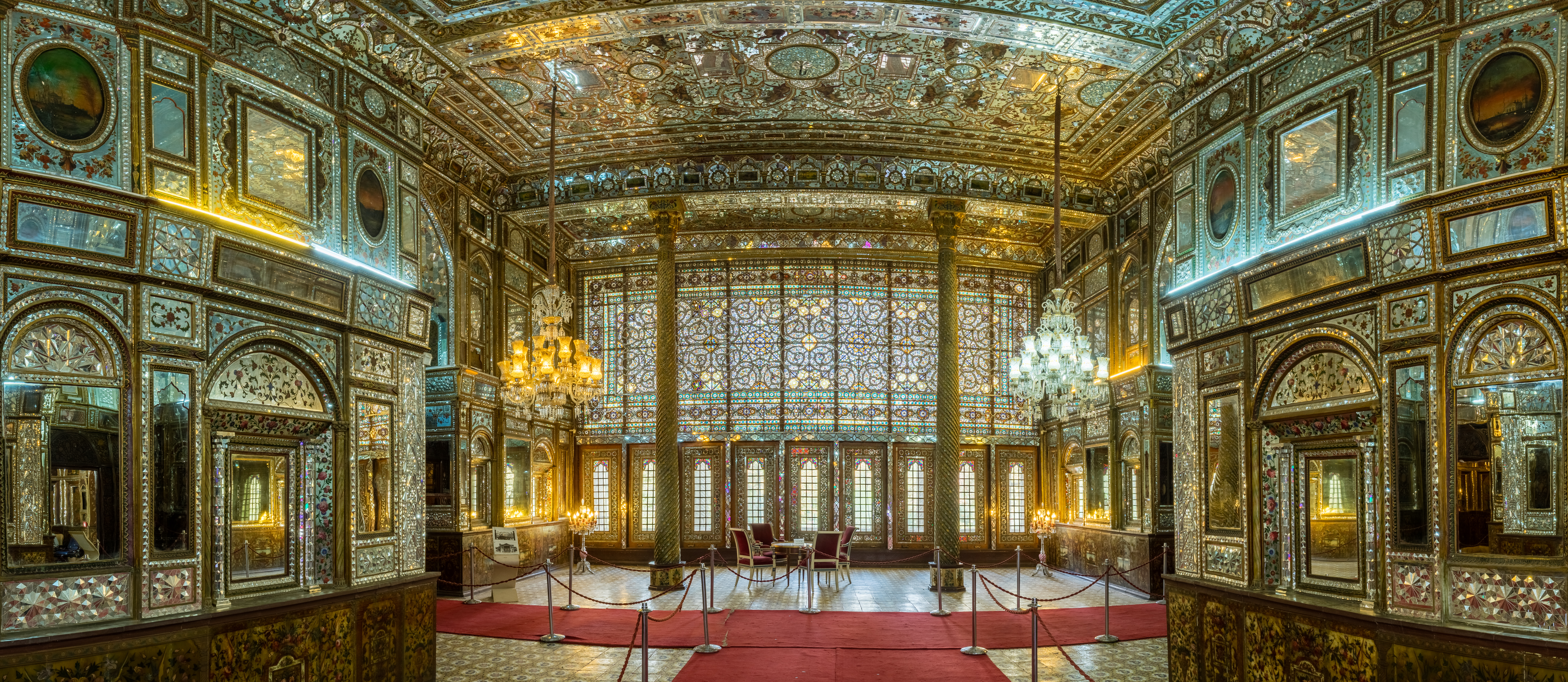
Golestan Palace, Tehran

Number of foreign tourists in Iran

The 2008 figures from the World Tourism Organization for the origin of visitors to Iran show that building up visitors from the Islamic and wider Asian world would have to start from a low base. Around three-quarters of those entering Iran in 1999 came from Europe. According to the New York Times, unlike most Americans who stopped visiting Iran after the Revolution, European tourists continued to visit the country in similar numbers after the Revolution. This was mainly because the Revolution was Anti-American in nature, but not so much Anti-European.

Citizens of the US, United Kingdom, and Canada must by law have a tour guide with them at all times.

Organized tours from Germany, France, the UK and other European countries come to Iran to visit archaeological sites and monuments. Iran had 21 places on the world cultural heritage list as of August 2017, attracting many cultural tourists.

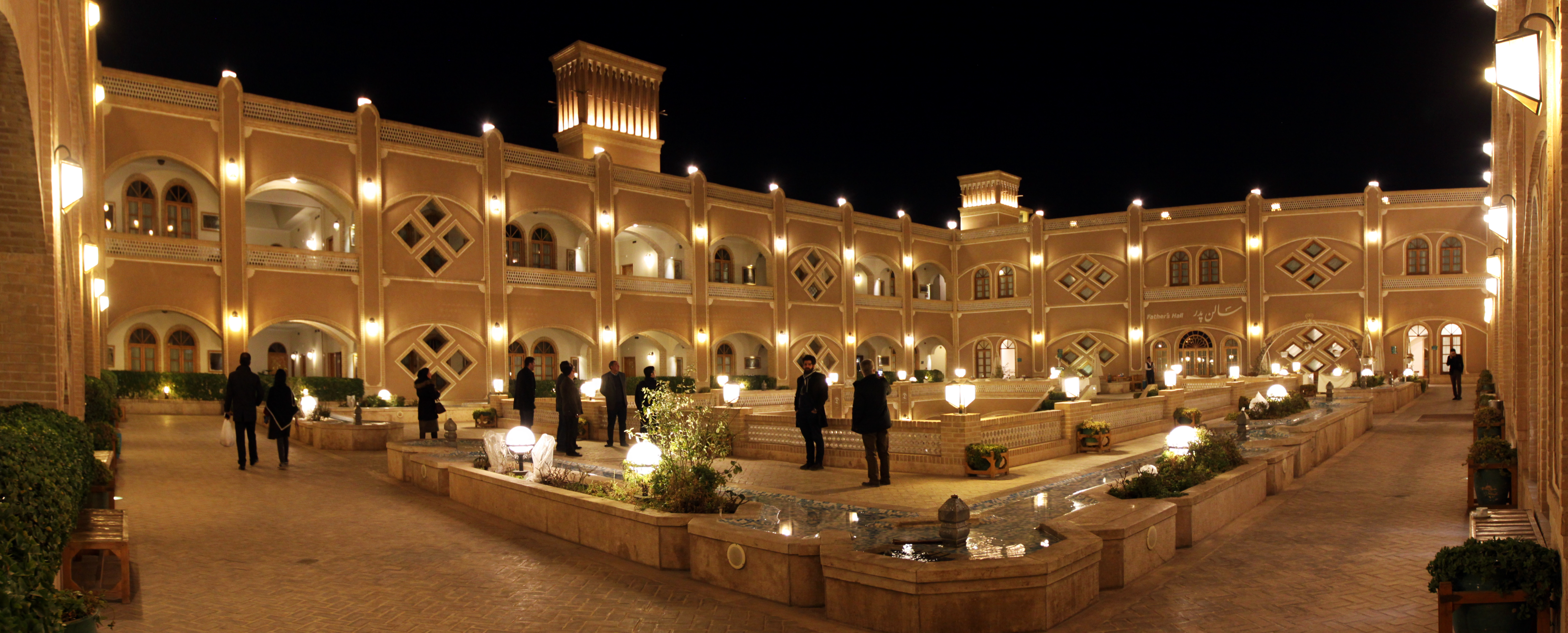
Yazd Historical hotel

According to official statistics, about 1,659,000 foreign tourists visited Iran in 2004 – although government statistics do not distinguish between tourism, business and religious pilgrims; most came from Asian countries, including the republics of Central Asia, while a small share (about 10%) came from North America and the European Union, including Germany, Italy, Bulgaria, France and Belgium. The most popular tourist destinations were Mazandaran province, Yazd, Isfahan, Mashhad, Gilan province and Fars province. There is scope for increased visitors from the Islamic world, and possibly also from non-Muslim countries with which Iran is developing business and political links, such as China and India.

From 2004, the country experienced a 100 percent growth in foreign tourist arrivals until mid-2008, when the number of foreign arrivals surged up to 2.5 million. In particular, there was an enormous increase in the number of German tourists traveling to Iran.

The World Travel and Tourism Council claims that business and personal tourism rose by 11.3% and 4.6%, respectively, in real terms in 2007, with the growth in personal tourism modestly below that of the preceding year.

In 2011, most of Iran's international visitors arrived in Iran solely for the purpose of leisure travel. Leisure tourists arriving from abroad are also often relatives of Iranian citizens or expatriates residing outside of Iran returning to visit. Another key segment of international arrival traffic are pilgrims come to pay a visit to holy sites in the country.

The number of international arrivals increased, up from 2.2 million people in 2009 to 3.6 million in 2011, with per capita spending of $1,850 per visit on average.

Over five million tourists visited Iran in the fiscal year of 2014–2015, ending March 21, four percent more year-on-year.

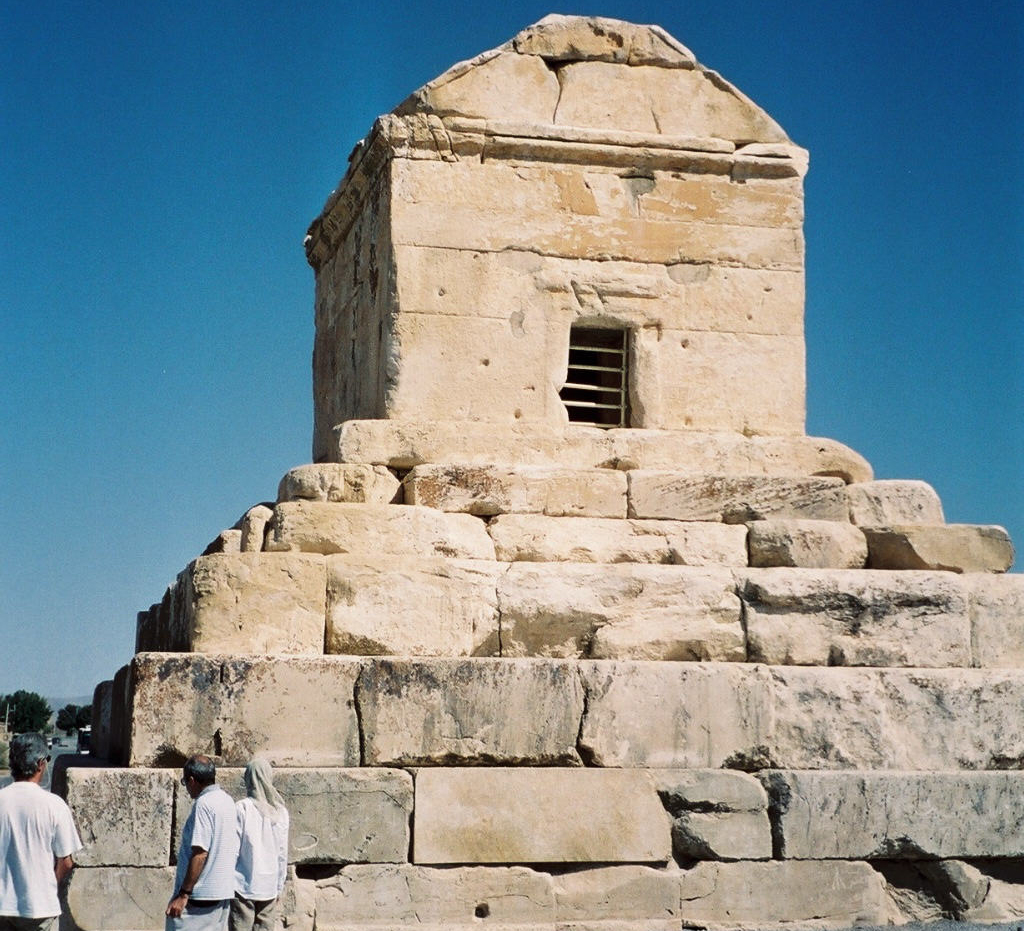
Cyrus' tomb lies in Pasargadae, a UNESCO World Heritage Site. Iran is home to 30 historic sites which have been inscribed on UNESCO World Heritage List.

(Source: EIU)	2004	2005	2006 est.
International tourism, arrivals ('000)	1,656	1,720	1,769
International tourism, receipts (US$ m)	917	971	1,022

Mazandaran is the first tourist destination in Iran. In 2023, in the first 9 months of the year, more than 100 million people visited the province.

=== Visa requirement ===
Iran has tried to improve its complex and time-consuming visa application process, and started to issue week-long visas for the nationals of 68 countries at airports.

Iran has road border crossings connecting it with Iraq, Turkey, Afghanistan, Pakistan, Turkmenistan, Armenia and Azerbaijan. Rail lines from Turkey and Turkmenistan can also be used to enter Iran. About 70% of visitors arrived by land in 2002, about 29% by air and less than 1% by sea. In April 2005, the Imam Khomeini International Airport was reopened under the management of a consortium of four local airlines—Mahan Air, Aseman, Caspian Air and Kish Air—although no formal contract appeared to have been awarded.

After the COVID-19 pandemic, Iran decided to boost its tourism sector. It announced to waive visa fees for spectators of the 2022 FIFA World Cup, who wished to visit Iran.

== Infrastructure and the economy ==
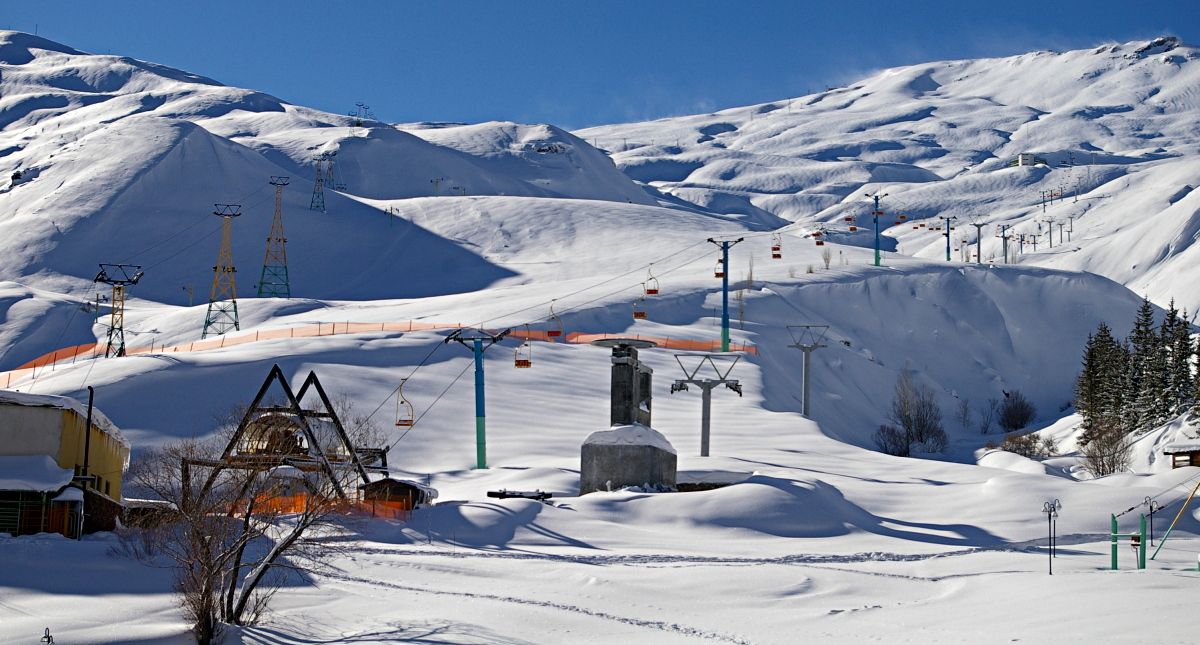
Dizin ski resort near Tehran

In the early 2000s the industry still faced serious limitations in infrastructure, communications, regulatory norms, and personnel training. In late 2003, there were about 640 hotels in Iran and around 63,000 beds.

In FY 2003 Iran had about 69,000 restaurants and 6,000 hotels and other lodging places; about 80 percent of these establishments were in urban areas. Some 875 restaurants and hotels were publicly managed by cooperatives and government organizations. More than 95 percent of restaurants and hotels had fewer than five employees, and only 38 had more than 100 employees. In FY 2002 this sector employed more than 166,000 people, 42,000 of whom worked in places of lodging. Of the 56,618 beds in all hotels, about half were located in three- to five-star hotels.

In recent years, 235 hotels, hotel apartments, motels and guesthouses have become operational nationwide. As of 2010, 400 hotels and 200 hotel apartments are under construction nationwide. Some 66 percent of these projects are underway in the provinces of Tehran, Gilan, Mazandaran, Razavi Khorasan and Isfahan.

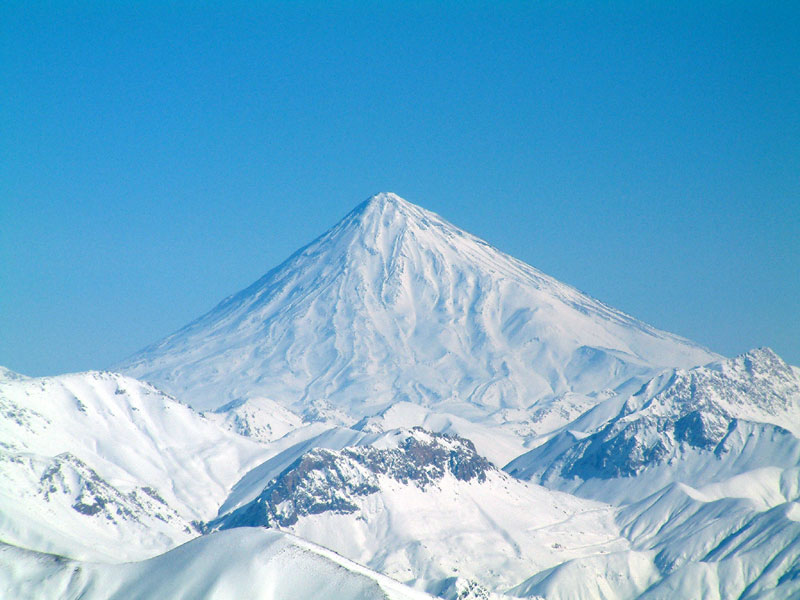
Mount Damavand in Amol

=== Cultural Heritage, Handicrafts and Tourism Organization of Iran ===
Reason for domestic travel and overnight stay
1. Visiting friends and relatives (49.0%)
2. Sightseeing and entertainment (24.0%)
3. Pilgrimage (17.0%)
4. Medical (6.00%)
5. Other (4.00%)

Iran's Cultural Heritage, Tourism and Handicrafts Organization is responsible for the establishment, development and operation of tourism facilities in Iran, planning for the repair or extension of tourism facilities through direct investment or providing loans to the private sector or entering into partnership with the private sector, issuing licenses and supervising the establishment and administration of hotels and restaurants and travel agencies and qualification and rating of these units.

Area considered for further expansion in the tourism sector in Iran are eco tourism, coastlines, restoration of historical relics, handicraft townships, and health tourism (e.g. water therapy). 30,000 people come to Iran each year to receive medical treatment (2012). Iran might become the leading country in the Islamic World when it comes to medical tourism due to a number of reasons that include the country's geographical position, the fluctuation of Iranian currency that leads to lower prices in healthcare services, as well as the development in medical research and technology. The growth rate of the healthcare system which, according to the World Tourism Organization, has increased of 5% in last decade, seems to indicate that in the future Iran will be one of the most visited countries by medical tourists, above all coming from the neighbouring countries, such as Azerbaijan, Iraq and Persian Gulf States.

Officials state that Iran has in recent years earned about US$1bn a year from tourism. Close to 1.8% of national employment is generated in the tourism sector.

Weak advertising, unstable regional conditions, a poor public image in some parts of the world, and absence of efficient planning schemes in the tourism sector have all hindered the growth of tourism.

Iran's '20-Year Vision' document projects investment of over $32 billion in the country's tourism sector and targets 20 million tourists by 2025. In order to encourage domestic and foreign direct investment in this sector, the 50 percent tax exemption previously granted to tourism enterprises has been extended to include five-star hotels. Tariffs for utilities comply with industrial ones. Investment in Iran's free trade zones are exempt from taxes for up to 20 years. As of 2016, international hotel operators investing in Iran are Rotana (Abu Dhabi), Accor (France), Meliá (Spain) and Steigenberger (Germany) among others.

== Outward tourism ==
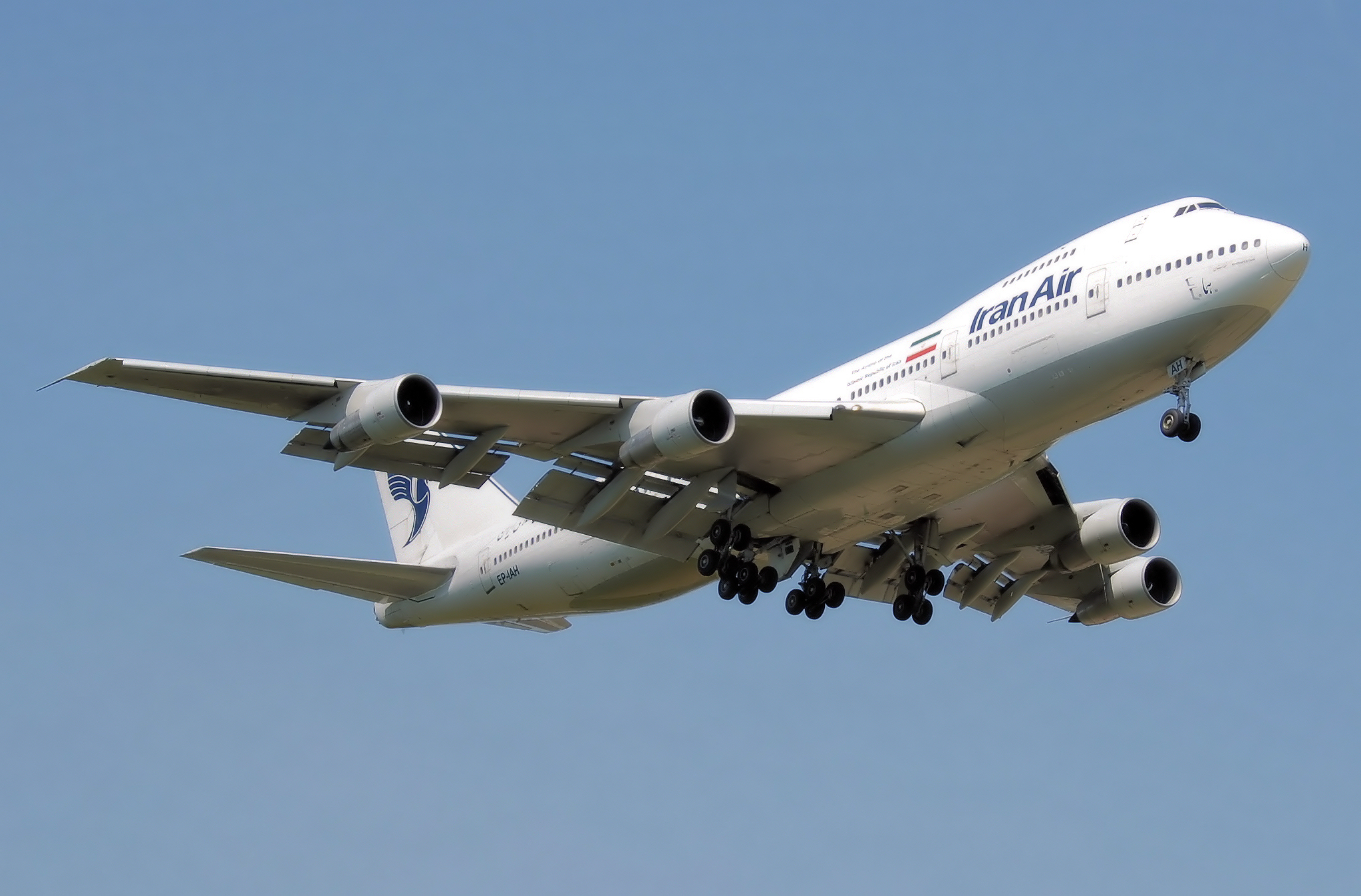
Iran Air is Iran's national airline

(Source: EIU)	2004	2005	2006 est.
International tourism, departures ('000)	3,478	3,648	3,986
International tourism, expenditure (US$ m)	4,353	1,380	1,579

Traditionally, only a small number of wealthy Iranian tourists traveled abroad, and the majority of the trips were business departures, mostly to neighboring states in the Persian Gulf and the wider Middle East (1 million each year), Central Asia and Turkey (~1 million). Although this is likely to continue to characterize much Iranian travel abroad, since the change of regime in Iraq in 2003, Iranians from all walks of life have visited their western neighbor. In addition, a large proportion of Iranians traveling abroad are likely to be visiting family, especially in Europe, the US and Australia (~1 million). Up until early 2012, because the Iranian rial was overvalued, the Iranian government was subsidizing its travelers abroad (2010). In 2011, some 27 million travelers and businessmen passed the Iranian custom departments.

Following the Iranian subsidy reform plan, airfares in Iran went up by 65% in 2012. In 2012, Iranians spent $18.5 billion on outward tourism. They spent $12 billion to purchase airplane tickets from foreign airlines between the years 2012–2015.

== See also ==
- Visa policy of Iran
- Visitor attractions in Iran
