= Asbu =

Asbu or Esbu (Persian: اسبو) may refer to:

- Asbu, Ardabil
- Asbu, Khalkhal, Ardabil Province
- Esbu, Mazandaran
- Arab States Broadcasting Union (ASBU)
