= Kehel, Ardabil =

Village in Ardabil province, Iran

Kehel Persian: كهل
- Village
- Location within Iran
- Coordinates: 37°13′12″N 48°49′00″E
- Country: Iran
- Province: Ardabil
- County: Khalkhal
- District: Shahrud
- Rural District: Shal

Population (2016)
  - Total: 162
- Time zone: UTC+3:30 (IRST)

Kehel (Persian: كهل) is a village in Shal Rural District of Shahrud District in Khalkhal County, Ardabil province, Iran.

== Demographics ==
=== Population ===
At the time of the 2006 National Census, the village's population was 131 in 40 households. The following census in 2011 counted 144 people in 39 households. The 2016 census measured the population of the village as 162 people in 56 households.
