= Sowmeeh-ye Rudbar =

Village in Ardabil province, Iran

Sowmeeh-ye Rudbar Persian: صومعه رودبار
- Village
- Location within Iran
- Coordinates: 37°14′12″N 48°47′27″E
- Country: Iran
- Province: Ardabil
- County: Khalkhal
- District: Shahrud
- Rural District: Shal

Population (2016)
  - Total: 34
- Time zone: UTC+3:30 (IRST)

Sowmeeh-ye Rudbar (Persian: صومعه رودبار) (Note: Also romanized as Şowme‘eh-ye Rūdbār; also known as Şowma‘eh Sarā) is a village in Shal Rural District of Shahrud District in Khalkhal County, Ardabil province, Iran.

== Demographics ==
=== Population ===
At the time of the 2006 National Census, the village's population was 64 in 17 households. The following census in 2011 counted 74 people in 17 households. The 2016 census measured the population of the village as 34 people in 15 households.
