= Tazeh Kand-e Gandomabad =

Village in Ardabil province, Iran

Tazeh Kand-e Gandomabad Persian: تازه كندگندم اباد
- Village
- Location within Iran
- Coordinates: 37°09′02″N 48°51′51″E
- Country: Iran
- Province: Ardabil
- County: Khalkhal
- District: Shahrud
- Rural District: Shal

Population (2016)
  - Total: 11
- Time zone: UTC+3:30 (IRST)

Tazeh Kand-e Gandomabad (Persian: تازه كندگندم اباد) (Note: Also romanized as Tāzeh Kand-e Gandomābād; also known as Taza-Kend and Tāzeh Kand) is a village in Shal Rural District of Shahrud District in Khalkhal County, Ardabil province, Iran.

== Demographics ==
=== Population ===
At the time of the 2006 National Census, the village's population was 52 in 11 households. The following census in 2011 counted 38 people in eight households. The 2016 census measured the population of the village as 11 people in five households.
