= Khaneqah-e Gilavan =

Village in Ardabil province, Iran

Khaneqah-e Gilavan Persian: خانقاه گيلوان
- Village
- Location within Iran
- Coordinates: 37°17′30″N 48°49′37″E
- Country: Iran
- Province: Ardabil
- County: Khalkhal
- District: Shahrud
- Rural District: Shal

Population (2016)
  - Total: 175
- Time zone: UTC+3:30 (IRST)

Khaneqah-e Gilavan (Persian: خانقاه گيلوان) (Note: Also romanized as Khāneqāh-e Gīlavān; also known as Kanaga, Kanjeh, Khānehqāh, Khāneqāh, and Khānehqāh-e Gīlavān) is a village in Shal Rural District of Shahrud District in Khalkhal County, Ardabil province, Iran.

== Demographics ==
=== Population ===
At the time of the 2006 National Census, the village's population was 112 in 40 households. The following census in 2011 counted 152 people in 57 households. The 2016 census measured the population of the village as 175 people in 58 households.
