= Jalalabad, Ardabil =

Village in Ardabil province, Iran

Jalalabad Persian: جلال اباد
- Village
- Location within Iran
- Coordinates: 37°11′42″N 48°52′53″E
- Country: Iran
- Province: Ardabil
- County: Khalkhal
- District: Shahrud
- Rural District: Shal

Population (2016)
  - Total: 52
- Time zone: UTC+3:30 (IRST)

Jalalabad (Persian: جلال اباد) (Note: Also romanized as Jalālābād) is a village in Shal Rural District of Shahrud District in Khalkhal County, Ardabil province, Iran.

== Demographics ==
=== Population ===
At the time of the 2006 National Census, the village's population was 82 in 14 households. The following census in 2011 counted 71 people in 15 households. The 2016 census measured the population of the village as 52 people in 19 households.
