= Taharom Dasht =

Village in Ardabil province, Iran

Taharom Dasht Persian: طهارم دشت
- Village
- Location within Iran
- Coordinates: 37°16′13″N 48°45′23″E
- Country: Iran
- Province: Ardabil
- County: Khalkhal
- District: Shahrud
- Rural District: Shal

Population (2016)
  - Total: 93
- Time zone: UTC+3:30 (IRST)

Taharom Dasht (Persian: طهارم دشت) (Note: Also romanized as Ţahārom Dasht; also known as Ţahārem, Ţahārom, and Ţārom Dasht) is a village in Shal Rural District of Shahrud District in Khalkhal County, Ardabil province, Iran.

== Demographics ==
=== Population ===
Taharam Dasht is a village in Iran, located in Ardabil Province, Khalkhal County, Shahroud District. It lies along the Khalkhal–Masuleh road. According to available data, Taharam Dasht has a permanent population of about 124 people.

Taharam Dasht is one of the oldest villages in the Shahroud region. In the past, the ancestors of this village were engaged in occupations such as dyeing, goldsmithing, pottery, and other traditional crafts, and traces of these activities can still be seen today despite the passage of many years.

Interestingly, the village has two shrines (Imamzadehs), two mosques, and two cemeteries. One of the shrines has recently been renovated through the efforts of local residents and now features a steel dome painted green and brick walls. The courtyard of this shrine, which is enclosed by concrete blocks, also contains an ancient mulberry tree.

One of the mosques in the village is very old and is located in a position that overlooks all directions of the village. At present, most of the residents of Taharam Dasht are engaged in gardening and orchard-related work.

It is worth noting that due to its location on one of the main connecting routes of the Shahroud region, as well as its relatively milder climate compared to other nearby villages, Taharam Dasht was once a center of trade and exchange for the upstream villages in the area. However, with the expansion of urbanization, many residents have migrated to cities, and occupations such as animal husbandry (almost completely) and agriculture (to some extent) have declined.

Taharam Dasht is located approximately 40 kilometers west of Masuleh and 52 kilometers south of the city of Khalkhal. There are two connecting routes from Taharam Dasht to Ab Bar (in Tarom County, Zanjan Province). About 90 percent of these routes are paved, while the remaining sections are unpaved. One of the routes is approximately 82 kilometers long, and the other is about 77 kilometer. The following census in 2011 counted 128 people in 40 households. The 2016 census measured the population of the village as 93 people in 38 households.

== See also ==
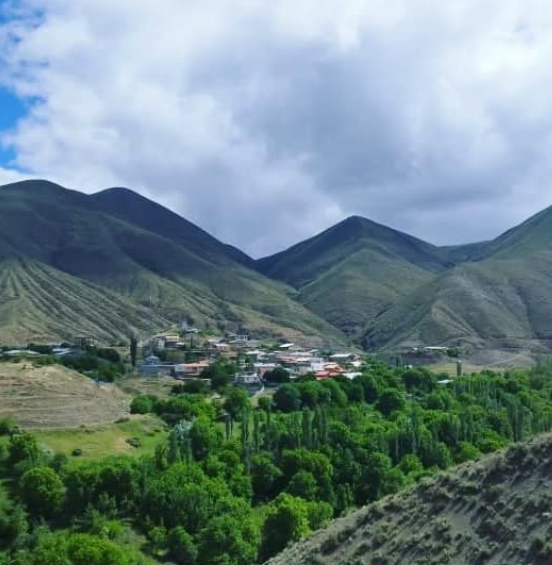
