= Qeshlaq-e Gilvan =

Village in Ardabil province, Iran

Qeshlaq-e Gilvan Persian: قشلاق گيلوان
- Village
- Location within Iran
- Coordinates: 37°17′39″N 48°46′03″E
- Country: Iran
- Province: Ardabil
- County: Khalkhal
- District: Shahrud
- Rural District: Shal

Population (2016)
  - Total: 109
- Time zone: UTC+3:30 (IRST)

Qeshlaq-e Gilvan (Persian: قشلاق گيلوان) (Note: Also romanized as Qeshlāq-e Gīlvān) is a village in Shal Rural District of Shahrud District in Khalkhal County, Ardabil province, Iran.

== Demographics ==
=== Population ===
At the time of the 2006 National Census, the village's population was 219 in 59 households. The following census in 2011 counted 202 people in 53 households. The 2016 census measured the population of the village as 109 people in 44 households.
