= Karin, Ardabil =

Village in Ardabil province, Iran

Karin Persian: كرين
- Village
- Location within Iran
- Coordinates: 37°18′57″N 48°40′02″E
- Country: Iran
- Province: Ardabil
- County: Khalkhal
- District: Shahrud
- Rural District: Palanga

Population (2016)
  - Total: 268
- Time zone: UTC+3:30 (IRST)

Karin (Persian: كرين) (Note: Also romanized as Karīn; also known as Karan-e Bozorg) is a village in, and the capital of, Palanga Rural District in Shahrud District of Khalkhal County, Ardabil province, Iran.

== Demographics ==
=== Population ===
At the time of the 2006 National Census, the village's population was 539 in 153 households. The following census in 2011 counted 429 people in 128 households. The 2016 census measured the population of the village as 268 people in 110 households.
