= Qeshlaq-e Diz =

Village in Ardabil province, Iran

Qeshlaq-e Diz Persian: قشلاق ديز
- Village
- Location within Iran
- Coordinates: 37°18′10″N 48°43′20″E
- Country: Iran
- Province: Ardabil
- County: Khalkhal
- District: Shahrud
- Rural District: Shal

Population (2016)
  - Total: 173
- Time zone: UTC+3:30 (IRST)

Qeshlaq-e Diz (Persian: قشلاق ديز) (Note: Also romanized as Qeshlāq-e Dīz) is a village in Shal Rural District of Shahrud District in Khalkhal County, Ardabil province, Iran.

== Demographics ==
=== Population ===
At the time of the 2006 National Census, the village's population was 330 in 79 households. The following census in 2011 counted 320 people in 79 households. The 2016 census measured the population of the village as 173 people in 59 households.
