= Derav, Iran =

Village in Ardabil province, Iran

Derav Persian: درو
- Village
- Location within Iran
- Coordinates: 37°24′45″N 48°42′06″E
- Country: Iran
- Province: Ardabil
- County: Khalkhal
- District: Shahrud
- Rural District: Shahrud

Population (2016)
  - Total: 439
- Time zone: UTC+3:30 (IRST)

Derav (Persian: درو) (Note: Also romanized as Derow; also known as Dehru) is a village in Shahrud Rural District of Shahrud District in Khalkhal County, Ardabil province, Iran.

== Demographics ==
=== Population ===
At the time of the 2006 National Census, the village's population was 567 in 202 households. The following census in 2011 counted 475 people in 194 households. The 2016 census measured the population of the village as 439 people in 178 households. It was the most populous village in its rural district.
