= Farajabad, Ardabil =

Village in Ardabil province, Iran

Farajabad Persian: فرج اباد
- Village
- Location within Iran
- Coordinates: 37°13′38″N 48°42′09″E
- Country: Iran
- Province: Ardabil
- County: Khalkhal
- District: Shahrud
- Rural District: Palanga

Population (2016)
  - Total: 22
- Time zone: UTC+3:30 (IRST)

Farajabad (Persian: فرج اباد) (Note: Also romanized as Farajābād) is a village in Palanga Rural District of Shahrud District in Khalkhal County, Ardabil province, Iran.

== Demographics ==
=== Population ===
At the time of the 2006 National Census, the village's population was 76 in 20 households. The following census in 2011 counted 59 people in 20 households. The 2016 census measured the population of the village as 22 people in eight households.
