= Gandomabad =

Village in Ardabil province, Iran

Gandomabad Persian: گندم اباد
- Village
- Location within Iran
- Coordinates: 37°10′16″N 48°50′25″E
- Country: Iran
- Province: Ardabil
- County: Khalkhal
- District: Shahrud
- Rural District: Shal

Population (2016)
  - Total: 33
- Time zone: UTC+3:30 (IRST)

Gandomabad (Persian: گندم اباد) (Note: Also romanized as Gandomābād; also known as Gandam-Ab, Gandomāb, and Yeylāg-e Gandomābād) is a village in Shal Rural District of Shahrud District in Khalkhal County, Ardabil province, Iran.

== Demographics ==
=== Population ===
At the time of the 2006 National Census, the village's population was 78 in 20 households. The following census in 2011 counted 62 people in 18 households. The 2016 census measured the population of the village as 33 people in 13 households.
