= Chamlu Gabin =

Village in Ardabil province, Iran

Chamlu Gabin Persian: چملوگبين
- Village
- Location within Iran
- Coordinates: 37°10′04″N 48°47′42″E
- Country: Iran
- Province: Ardabil
- County: Khalkhal
- District: Shahrud
- Rural District: Shal

Population (2016)
  - Total: 75
- Time zone: UTC+3:30 (IRST)

Chamlu Gabin (Persian: چملوگبين) (Note: Also romanized as Chamlū Gabīn; also known as Chamlagaban, Chamleh Jaban, Chamlūgaben, and Yāhalīq (ياهليق)) is a village in Shal Rural District of Shahrud District in Khalkhal County, Ardabil province, Iran. It is located in the Alborz (Elburz) mountain range.

== Demographics ==
=== Population ===
At the time of the 2006 National Census, the village's population was 68 in 20 households. The following census in 2011 counted 59 people in 20 households. The 2016 census measured the population of the village as 75 people in 35 households.
