= Ahmadabad, Khalkhal =

Village in Ardabil province, Iran

Ahmadabad Persian: احمداباد
- Village
- Location within Iran
- Coordinates: 37°10′54″N 48°47′07″E
- Country: Iran
- Province: Ardabil
- County: Khalkhal
- District: Shahrud
- Rural District: Shal

Population (2016)
  - Total: 38
- Time zone: UTC+3:30 (IRST)

Ahmadabad (Persian: احمداباد) (Note: Also romanized as Aḩmadābād) is a village in Shal Rural District of Shahrud District in Khalkhal County, Ardabil province, Iran.

== Demographics ==
=== Population ===
At the time of the 2006 National Census, the village's population was 50 in 10 households. The following census in 2011 counted 37 people in 11 households. The 2016 census measured the population of the village as 38 people in 17 households.
