= Sheykh Alilar =

Village in Ardabil province, Iran

Sheykh Alilar Persian: شيخ علي لر
- Village
- Location within Iran
- Coordinates: 37°08′58″N 48°48′05″E
- Country: Iran
- Province: Ardabil
- County: Khalkhal
- District: Shahrud
- Rural District: Shal

Population (2016)
  - Total: 8
- Time zone: UTC+3:30 (IRST)

Sheykh Alilar (Persian: شيخ علي لر) (Note: Also romanized as Sheykh ‘Alīlar and Sheikhali Lar; also known as Sheykh Alar, Sheykh ‘Alī, and Sheykh-Ali) is a village in Shal Rural District of Shahrud District in Khalkhal County, Ardabil province, Iran.

== Demographics ==
=== Population ===
At the time of the 2006 National Census, the village's population was 19 in eight households. The following census in 2011 counted 28 people in 13 households. The 2016 census measured the population of the village as eight people in four households.
