= Shal, Ardabil =

Village in Ardabil province, Iran

Shal Persian: شال
- Village
- Location within Iran
- Coordinates: 37°19′50″N 48°44′58″E
- Country: Iran
- Province: Ardabil
- County: Khalkhal
- District: Shahrud
- Rural District: Shal

Population (2016)
  - Total: 1,217
- Time zone: UTC+3:30 (IRST)

Shal (Persian: شال) (Note: Also romanized as Shāl) is a village in, and the capital of, Shal Rural District in Shahrud District of Khalkhal County, Ardabil province, Iran.

== Demographics ==
=== Population ===
At the time of the 2006 National Census, the village's population was 1,594 in 378 households. The following census in 2011 counted 881 people in 295 households. The 2016 census measured the population of the village as 1,217 people in 397 households. It was the most populous village in its rural district.
