= Diz, Shahrud =

Village in Ardabil province, Iran

Diz Persian: ديز
- Village
- Location within Iran
- Coordinates: 37°19′12″N 48°44′29″E
- Country: Iran
- Province: Ardabil
- County: Khalkhal
- District: Shahrud
- Rural District: Shal

Population (2016)
  - Total: 415
- Time zone: UTC+3:30 (IRST)

Diz (Persian: ديز) (Note: Also romanized as Dīz; also known as Dizeh) is a village in Shal Rural District of Shahrud District in Khalkhal County, Ardabil province, Iran.

== Demographics ==
=== Population ===
At the time of the 2006 National Census, the village's population was 509 in 136 households. The following census in 2011 counted 473 people in 133 households. The 2016 census measured the population of the village as 415 people in 147 households.
