= Deylamabad =

Village in Ardabil province, Iran

Deylamabad Persian: ديلم اباد
- Village
- Location within Iran
- Coordinates: 37°22′34″N 48°46′55″E
- Country: Iran
- Province: Ardabil
- County: Khalkhal
- District: Shahrud
- Rural District: Shahrud

Population (2016)
  - Total: 169
- Time zone: UTC+3:30 (IRST)

Deylamabad (Persian: ديلم اباد) (Note: Also romanized as Deylamābād; also known as Dalamdeh, Dalmā Deh, and Deylamdeh) is a village in Shahrud Rural District of Shahrud District in Khalkhal County, Ardabil province, Iran.

== Demographics ==
=== Population ===
At the time of the 2006 National Census, the village's population was 218 in 51 households. The following census in 2011 counted 191 people in 50 households. The 2016 census measured the population of the village as 169 people in 54 households.
