= Gilavan, Ardabil =

Village in Ardabil province, Iran

Gilavan Persian: گيلوان
- Village
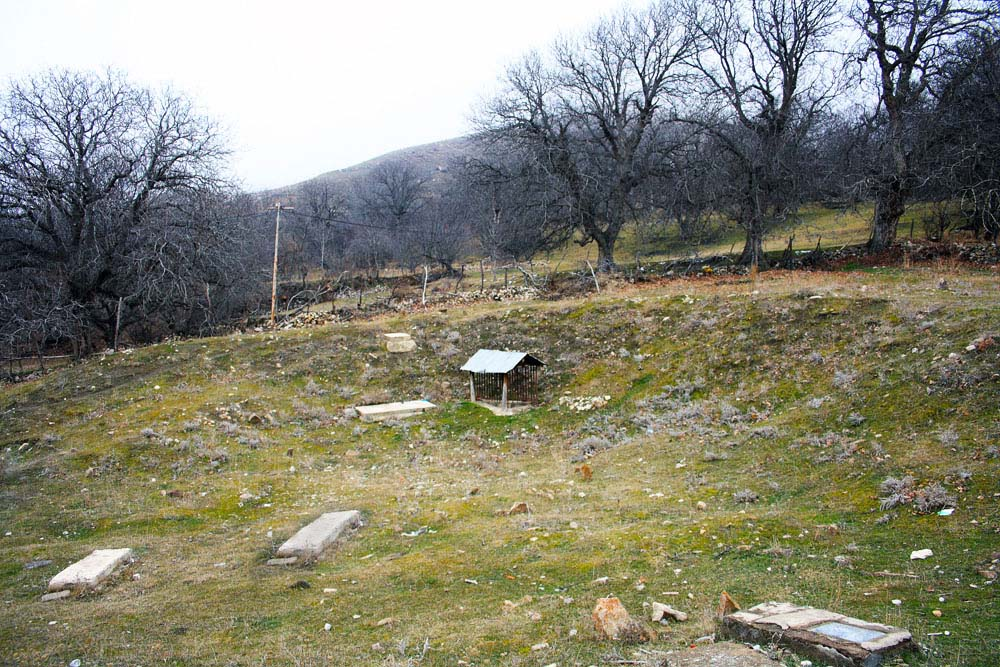
- The village of Gilavan

- Location within Iran
- Coordinates: 37°17′28″N 48°48′49″E
- Country: Iran
- Province: Ardabil
- County: Khalkhal
- District: Shahrud
- Rural District: Shal

Population (2016)
  - Total: 158
- Time zone: UTC+3:30 (IRST)

Gilavan (Persian: گيلوان) (Note: Also romanized as Gīlavān; also known as Kīlvān) is a village in Shal Rural District of Shahrud District in Khalkhal County, Ardabil province, Iran.

== Demographics ==
=== Population ===
At the time of the 2006 National Census, the village's population was 245 in 92 households. The following census in 2011 counted 201 people in 84 households. The 2016 census measured the population of the village as 158 people in 77 households.
