= Majulan =

Village in Ardabil province, Iran

Majulan Persian: ماجولان
- Village
- Location within Iran
- Coordinates: 37°14′09″N 48°50′50″E
- Country: Iran
- Province: Ardabil
- County: Khalkhal
- District: Shahrud
- Rural District: Shal

Population (2016)
  - Total: 178
- Time zone: UTC+3:30 (IRST)

Majulan (Persian: ماجولان) (Note: Also romanized as Mājūlān; also known as Badzhalan, Bājalān, Mājelān, and Mājlān) is a village in Shal Rural District of Shahrud District in Khalkhal County, Ardabil province, Iran.

== Demographics ==
=== Population ===
At the time of the 2006 National Census, the village's population was 258 in 74 households. The following census in 2011 counted 239 people in 80 households. The 2016 census measured the population of the village as 178 people in 82 households.
