= Mian Rudan, Ardabil =

Village in Ardabil province, Iran

Mian Rudan Persian: ميان رودان
- Village
- Location within Iran
- Coordinates: 37°25′25″N 48°36′12″E
- Country: Iran
- Province: Ardabil
- County: Khalkhal
- District: Shahrud
- Rural District: Palanga

Population (2016)
  - Total: 761
- Time zone: UTC+3:30 (IRST)

Mian Rudan (Persian: ميان رودان) (Note: Also romanized as Mīān Rūdān; also known as Mianrud) is a village in Palanga Rural District of Shahrud District in Khalkhal County, Ardabil province, Iran.

== Demographics ==
=== Population ===
At the time of the 2006 National Census, the village's population was 647 in 156 households. The following census in 2011 counted 760 people in 199 households. The 2016 census measured the population of the village as 761 people in 233 households.
