= Askestan =

Village in Ardabil province, Iran

Askestan Persian: اسكستان
- Village
- Location within Iran
- Coordinates: 37°27′59″N 48°40′15″E
- Country: Iran
- Province: Ardabil
- County: Khalkhal
- District: Shahrud
- Rural District: Shahrud

Population (2016)
  - Total: 336
- Time zone: UTC+3:30 (IRST)

Askestan (Persian: اسكستان) (Note: Also romanized as Askestān; also known as Asgestān and Askistan) is a village in Shahrud Rural District of Shahrud District in Khalkhal County, Ardabil province, Iran.

== Demographics ==
=== Population ===
At the time of the 2006 National Census, the village's population was 641 in 190 households. The following census in 2011 counted 469 people in 165 households. The 2016 census measured the population of the village as 336 people in 138 households.
