= Til, Ardabil =

Village in Ardabil province, Iran

Til Persian: تيل
- Village
- Location within Iran
- Coordinates: 37°15′18″N 48°39′32″E
- Country: Iran
- Province: Ardabil
- County: Khalkhal
- District: Shahrud
- Rural District: Palanga

Population (2016)
  - Total: 699
- Time zone: UTC+3:30 (IRST)

Til (Persian: تيل) (Note: Also romanized as Tīl)) is a village in Palanga Rural District of Shahrud District in Khalkhal County, Ardabil province, Iran.

== Demographics ==
=== Population ===
At the time of the 2006 National Census, the village's population was 928 in 221 households. The following census in 2011 counted 821 people in 194 households. The 2016 census measured the population of the village as 699 people in 206 households.
