= Olkash =

Village in Ardabil province, Iran

Olkash Persian: الكش
- Village
- Location within Iran
- Coordinates: 37°09′08″N 48°46′51″E
- Country: Iran
- Province: Ardabil
- County: Khalkhal
- District: Shahrud
- Rural District: Shal

Population (2016)
  - Total: 49
- Time zone: UTC+3:30 (IRST)

Olkash (Persian: الكش) (Note: Also known as Alenkash and Ulkash) is a village in Shal Rural District of Shahrud District in Khalkhal County, Ardabil province, Iran.

== Demographics ==
=== Population ===
At the time of the 2006 National Census, the village's population was 92 in 18 households. The following census in 2011 counted 80 people in 21 households. The 2016 census measured the population of the village as 49 people in 13 households.
