= Dasht Andar =

Village in Ardabil province, Iran

Dasht Andar Persian: دشت اندر
- Village
- Location within Iran
- Coordinates: 37°13′38″N 48°45′22″E
- Country: Iran
- Province: Ardabil
- County: Khalkhal
- District: Shahrud
- Rural District: Shal

Population (2016)
  - Total: 16
- Time zone: UTC+3:30 (IRST)

Dasht Andar (Persian: دشت اندر) is a village in Shal Rural District of Shahrud District in Khalkhal County, Ardabil province, Iran.

== Demographics ==
=== Population ===
At the time of the 2006 National Census, the village's population was 47 in 14 households. The following census in 2011 counted 30 people in 12 households. The 2016 census measured the population of the village as 16 people in seven households.
