= Tazeh Kand-e Galvazan =

Village in Ardabil province, Iran

Tazeh Kand-e Galvazan Persian: تازه كندگلوزان
- Village
- Location within Iran
- Coordinates: 37°12′50″N 48°43′53″E
- Country: Iran
- Province: Ardabil
- County: Khalkhal
- District: Shahrud
- Rural District: Shal

Population (2016)
  - Total: 154
- Time zone: UTC+3:30 (IRST)

Tazeh Kand-e Galvazan (Persian: تازه كندگلوزان) (Note: Also romanized as Tāzeh Kand-e Galvazān; also known as Tāzeh Kand) is a village in Shal Rural District of Shahrud District in Khalkhal County, Ardabil province, Iran.

== Demographics ==
=== Population ===
At the time of the 2006 National Census, the village's population was 201 in 48 households. The following census in 2011 counted 174 people in 47 households. The 2016 census measured the population of the village as 154 people in 59 households.
