= Azizabad, Khalkhal =

Village in Ardabil province, Iran

Azizabad Persian: عزيزاباد
- Village
- Location within Iran
- Coordinates: 37°17′14″N 48°41′33″E
- Country: Iran
- Province: Ardabil
- County: Khalkhal
- District: Shahrud
- Rural District: Palanga

Population (2016)
  - Total: 24
- Time zone: UTC+3:30 (IRST)

Azizabad (Persian: عزيزاباد) (Note: Also romanized as ‘Azīzābād; also known as Karūn Kesh) is a village in Palanga Rural District of Shahrud District in Khalkhal County, Ardabil province, Iran.

== Demographics ==
=== Population ===
At the time of the 2006 National Census, the village's population was 50 in 12 households. The following census in 2011 counted 27 people in eight households. The 2016 census measured the population of the village as 24 people in nine households.
