= Aliabad, Shal =

Village in Ardabil province, Iran

Aliabad Persian: علی‌آباد
- Village
- Location within Iran
- Coordinates: 37°15′22″N 48°48′23″E
- Country: Iran
- Province: Ardabil
- County: Khalkhal
- District: Shahrud
- Rural District: Shal

Population (2016)
  - Total: 29
- Time zone: UTC+3:30 (IRST)

Aliabad (Persian: علی‌آباد) (Note: Also romanized as ‘Alīābād) is a village in Shal Rural District of Shahrud District in Khalkhal County, Ardabil province, Iran.

== Demographics ==
=== Population ===
At the time of the 2006 National Census, the village's population was 35 in 10 households. The following census in 2011 counted 30 people in nine households. The 2016 census measured the population of the village as 29 people in 11 households.
