= Kolowr =

City in Ardabil province, Iran

Kolowr Persian: كلور
- City
- Location within Iran
- Coordinates: 37°23′22″N 48°43′22″E
- Country: Iran
- Province: Ardabil
- County: Khalkhal
- District: Shahrud

Population (2016)
  - Total: 2,347
- Time zone: UTC+3:30 (IRST)

Kolowr (Persian: كلور) (Note: Also romanized as Kolour and Kolūr; also known as Kulur; Tati: Kelur) is a city in, and the capital of, Shahrud District in Khalkhal County, Ardabil province, in northwestern Iran. It also serves as the administrative center for Shahrud Rural District. It is in the Alborz (Elburz) mountain range.

== Demographics ==
=== Language ===
The native language in Kolowr and other areas of Shahrud District is Tati.

=== Population ===
At the time of the 2006 National Census, the city's population was 2,380 in 675 households. The following census in 2011 counted 2,347 people in 784 households. The 2016 census measured the population of the city as 2,347 people in 784 households.
