= Shahrud Rural District =

Rural district in Ardabil province, Iran

Shahrud Rural District Persian: دهستان شاهرود
- Rural District
- Location within Iran
- Coordinates: 37°27′N 48°43′E
- Country: Iran
- Province: Ardabil
- County: Khalkhal
- District: Shahrud
- Established: 1987
- Capital: Kolowr

Population (2016)
  - Total: 1,213
- Time zone: UTC+3:30 (IRST)

Shahrud Rural District (Persian: دهستان شاهرود) is in Shahrud District of Khalkhal County, Ardabil province, Iran. It is administered from the city of Kolowr.

== Demographics ==
=== Population ===
At the time of the 2006 National Census, the rural district's population was 1,864 in 574 households. There were 1,423 inhabitants in 509 households at the following census of 2011. The 2016 census measured the population of the rural district as 1,213 in 479 households. The most populous of its four villages was Derav, with 439 people.

=== Other villages in the rural district ===
- Asbu
- Askestan
- Deylamabad
