= Asbu, Ardabil =

Village in Ardabil province, Iran

Asbu Persian: اسبو
- Village
- Location within Iran
- Coordinates: 37°26′48″N 48°40′19″E
- Country: Iran
- Province: Ardabil
- County: Khalkhal
- District: Shahrud
- Rural District: Shahrud

Population (2016)
  - Total: 269
- Time zone: UTC+3:30 (IRST)

Asbu (Persian: اسبو) (Note: Also romanized as Asbū; also known as Aspā and Asū) is a village in Shahrud Rural District of Shahrud District in Khalkhal County, Ardabil province, Iran.

== Demographics ==
=== Population ===
At the time of the 2006 National Census, the village's population was 438 in 131 households. The following census in 2011 counted 288 people in 100 households. The 2016 census measured the population of the village as 269 people in 109 households.
