= Shal Rural District =

Rural district in Ardabil province, Iran

Shal Rural District Persian: دهستان شال
- Rural District
- Location within Iran
- Coordinates: 37°16′N 48°48′E
- Country: Iran
- Province: Ardabil
- County: Khalkhal
- District: Shahrud
- Established: 1987
- Capital: Shal

Population (2016)
  - Total: 3,210
- Time zone: UTC+3:30 (IRST)

Shal Rural District (Persian: دهستان شال) is in Shahrud District of Khalkhal County, Ardabil province, Iran. Its capital is the village of Shal.

== Demographics ==
=== Population ===
At the time of the 2006 National Census, the rural district's population was 4,390 in 1,153 households. There were 3,503 inhabitants in 1,075 households at the following census of 2011. The 2016 census measured the population of the rural district as 3,210 in 1,165 households. The most populous of its 23 villages was Shal, with 1,217 people.

=== Other villages in the rural district ===
- Ahmadabad
- Aliabad
- Chamlu Gabin
- Dasht Andar
- Diz
- Gandomabad
- Gilavan
- Jalalabad
- Kehel
- Khaneqah-e Gilavan
- Majulan
- Olkash
- Qeshlaq-e Diz
- Qeshlaq-e Gilvan
- Sheykh Alilar
- Sowmeeh-ye Rudbar
- Taharom Dasht
- Tazeh Kand-e Galvazan
- Tazeh Kand-e Gandomabad
