= Lerd, Ardabil =

Village in Ardabil province, Iran

Lerd Persian: لرد
- Village
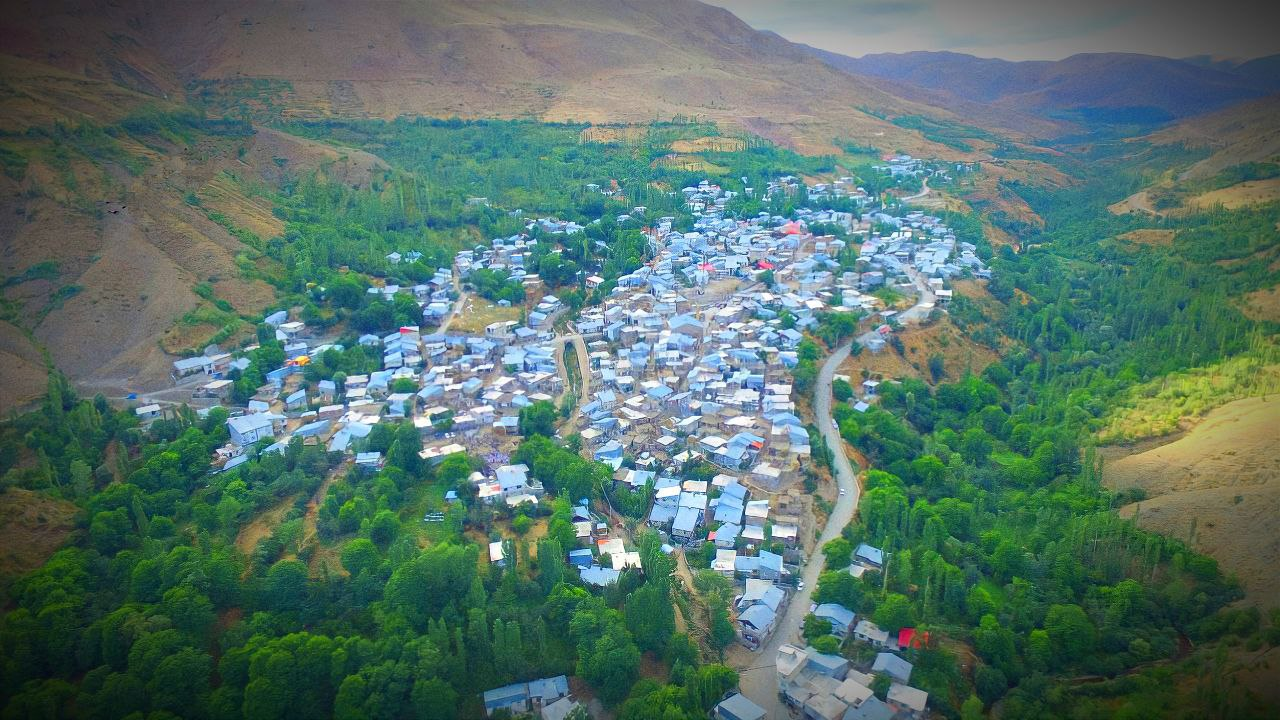

- Location within Iran
- Coordinates: 37°21′27″N 48°37′52″E
- Country: Iran
- Province: Ardabil
- County: Khalkhal
- District: Shahrud
- Rural District: Palanga

Population (2016)
  - Total: 3,226
- Time zone: UTC+3:30 (IRST)

Lerd (Persian: لرد) (Note: Also romanized as Lard; also known as Lert) is a tourist village in Palanga Rural District of Shahrud District in Khalkhal County, Ardabil province, Iran.

== Demographics ==
=== Language ===
The native people of Lerd speak Tati.

=== Population ===
At the time of the 2006 National Census, the city's population was 2,827 residents in 640 households. The census in 2011 counted 3,523 people in 926 households. The 2016 census measured the population of the city as 3,226 people in 983 households. It was the most populous village in its rural district.

== Climate ==
Lord is in the mountainous region of the high Agh Dagh Mountain.

== Tourist attractions ==
This village is considered the tourism pole of Khalkhal County. Among the souvenirs of this village are local women's clothes, dairy products, honey, walnuts, pears, and apples. The tomb of Imamzadeh Mohammad, the famous Sibieh Khani waterfall, and Kokholan-Bar stone cave are located at the entrance of the village.

== Souvenirs ==
The most famous handicrafts of this village, we can mention the local dress for women (in Tati language: sheh shelwar), which expresses the historical identity of the people of Lerd village.

== Gallery ==
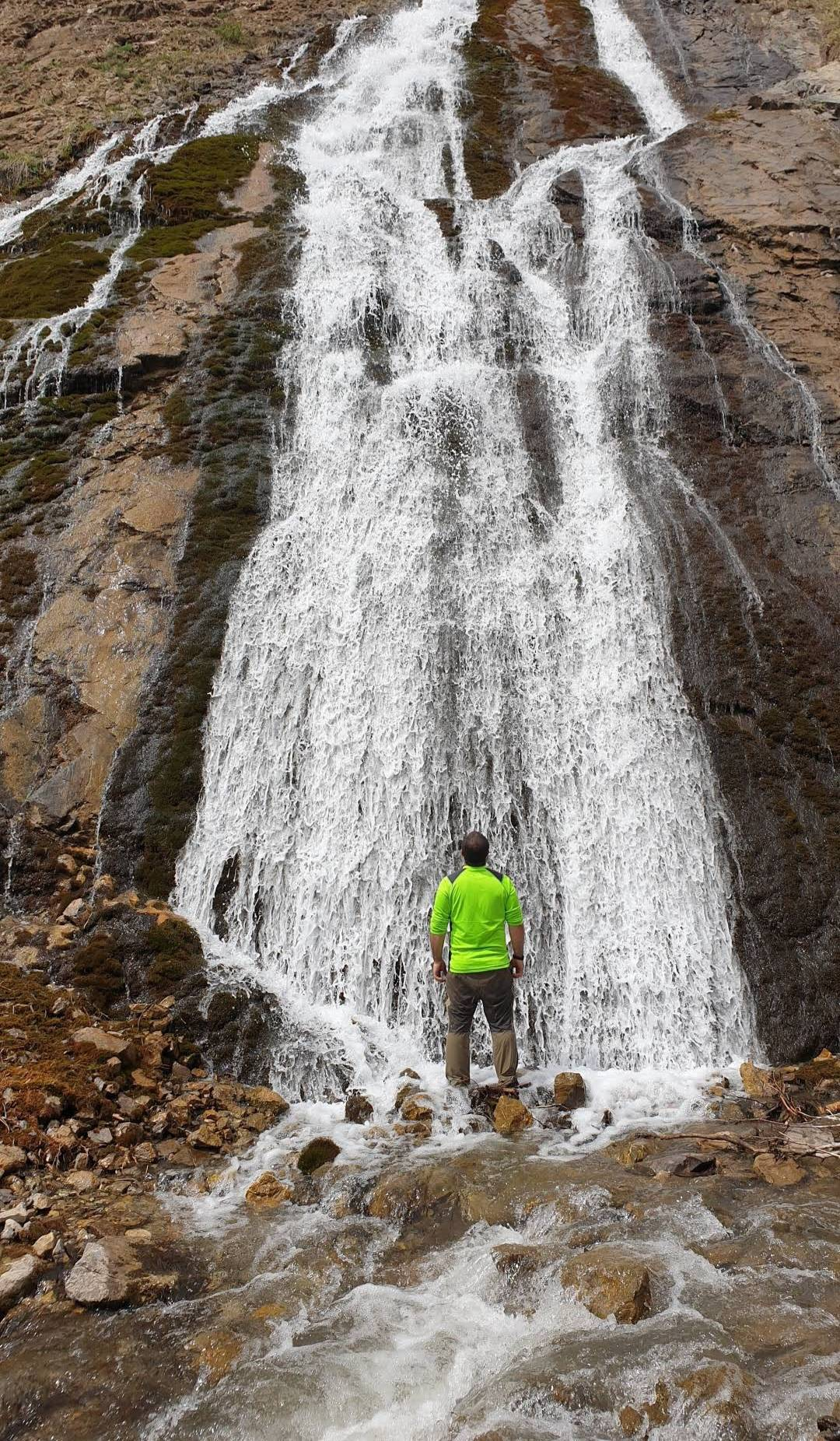
Sibieh Khani waterfall in Lerd tourist village, Ardabil province is one of the popular tourist destinations in Iran.

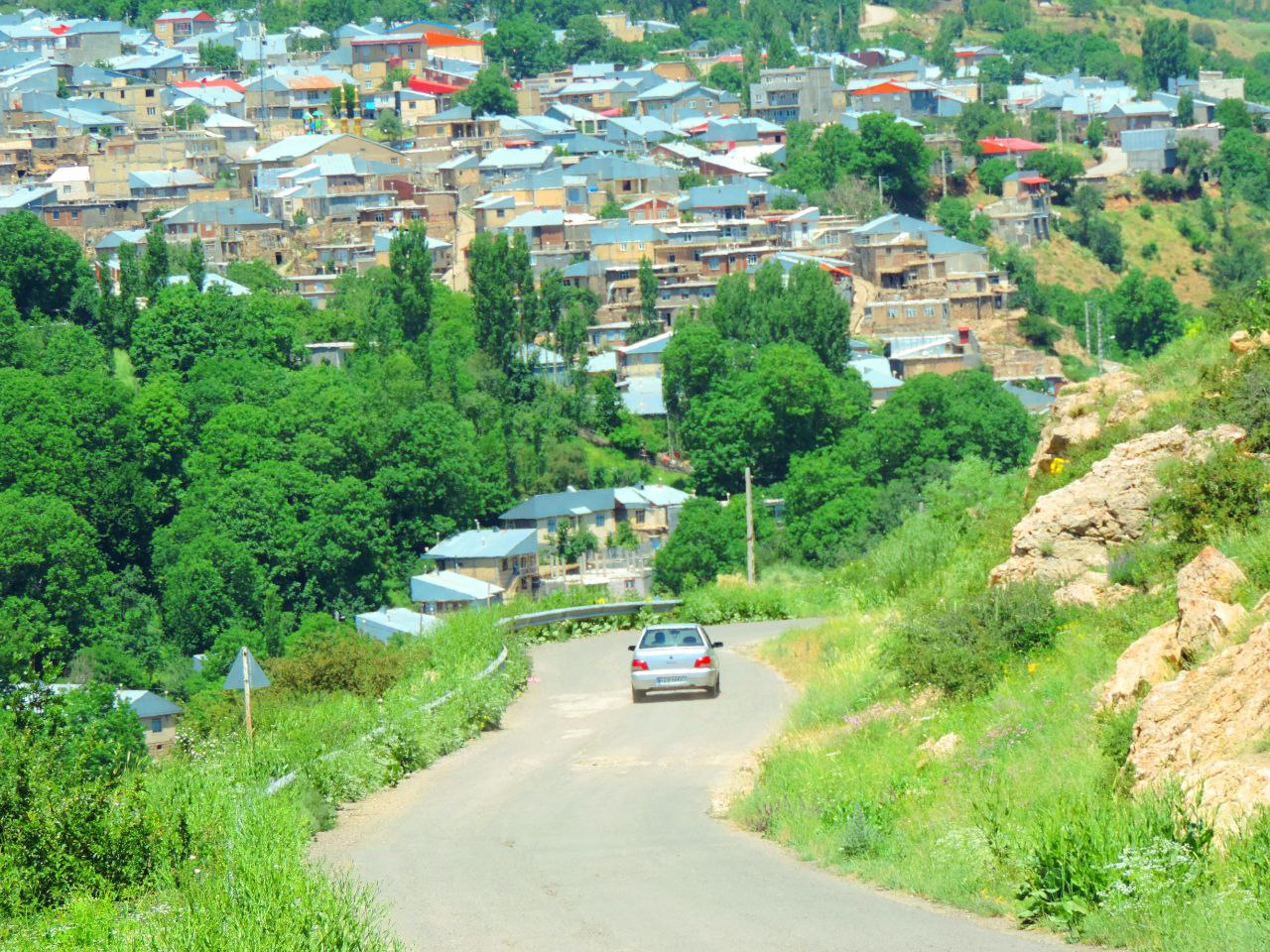

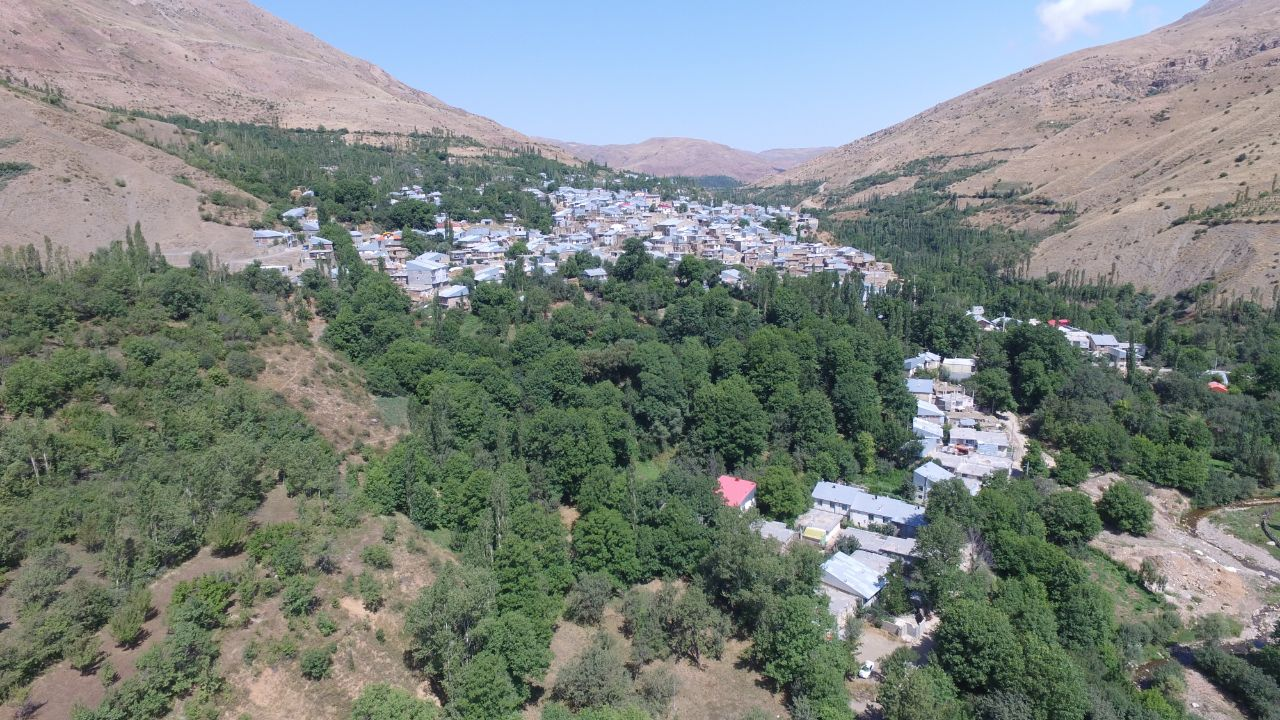
A picture from above

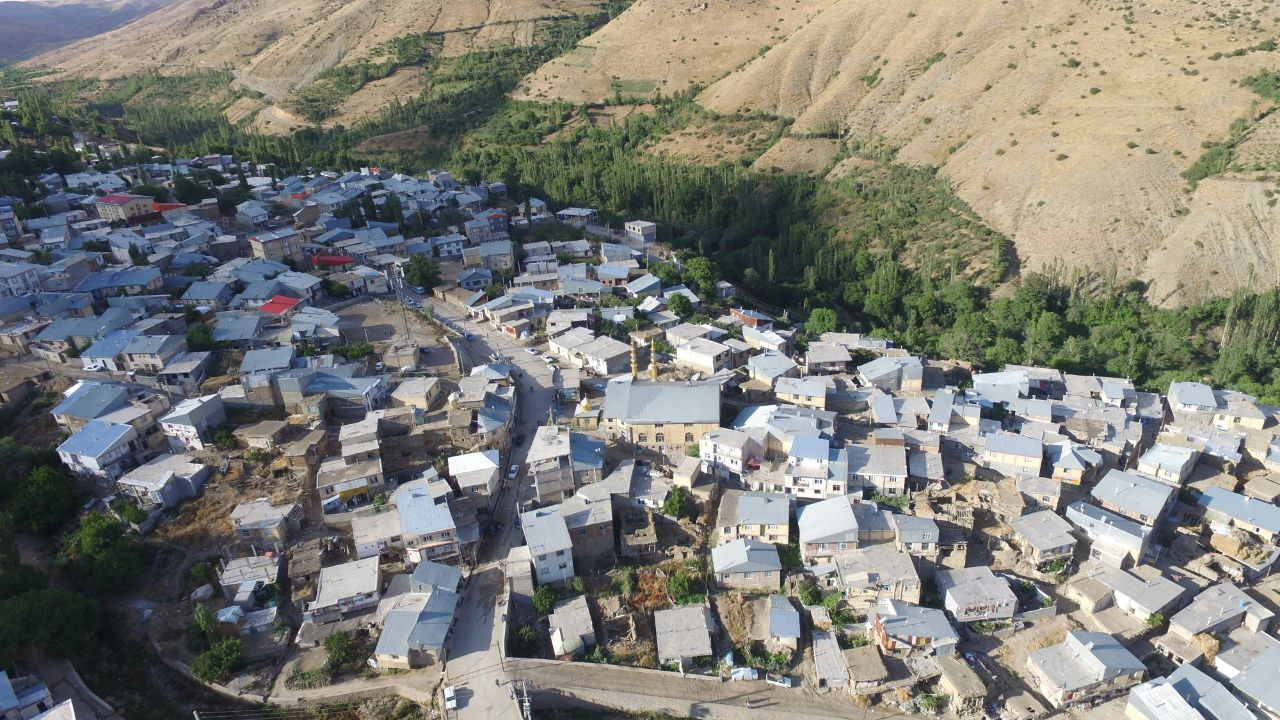
A picture from above

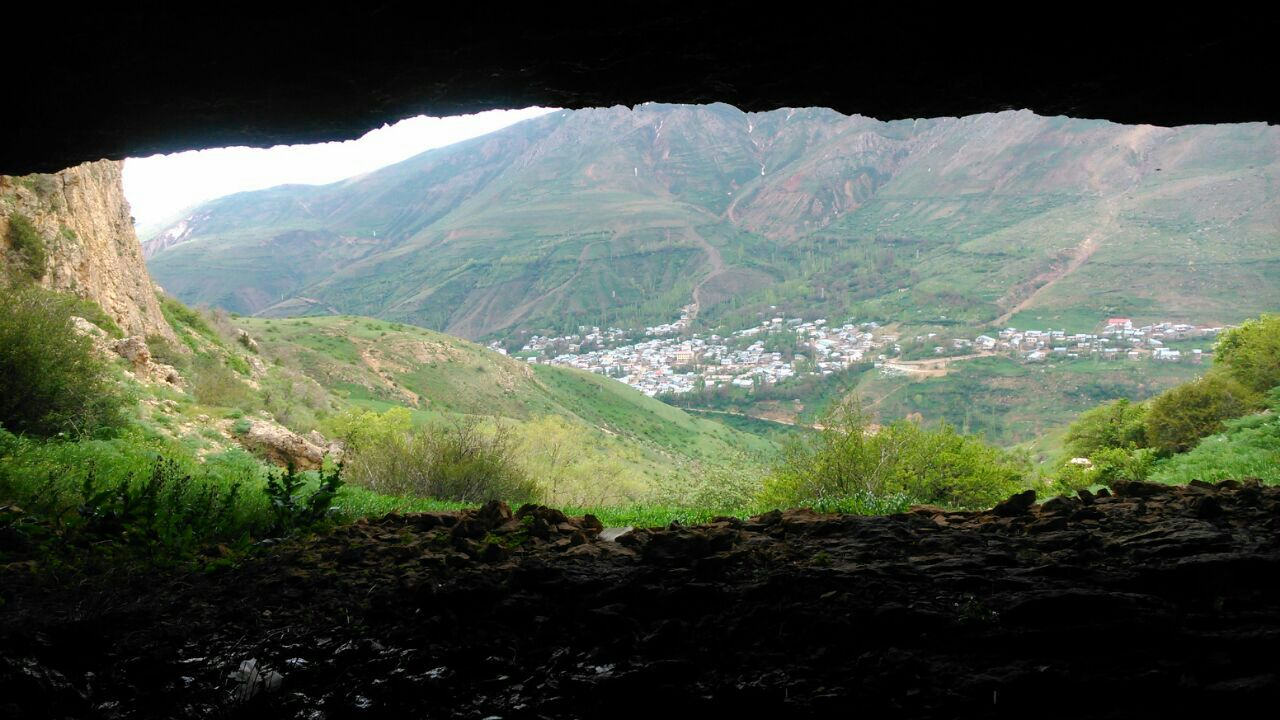

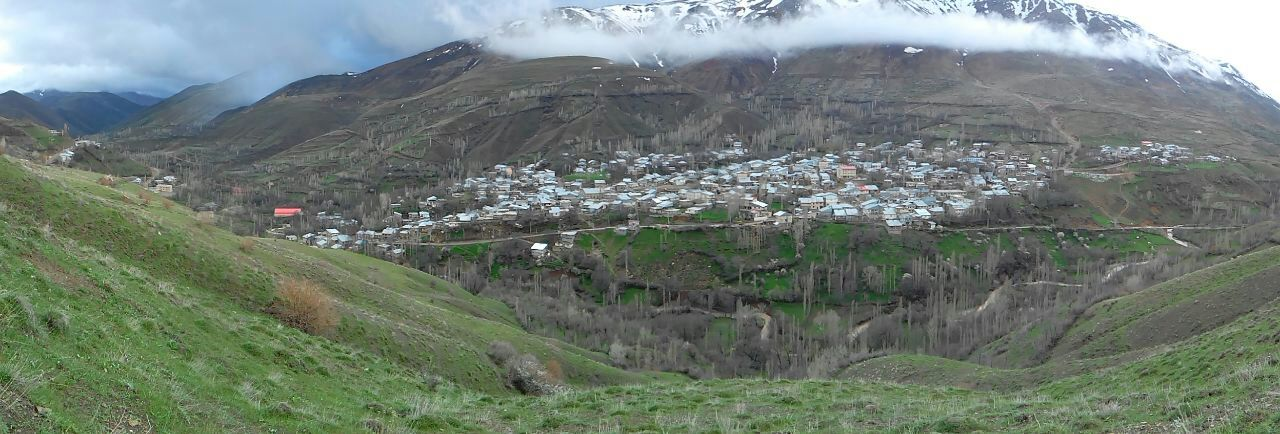

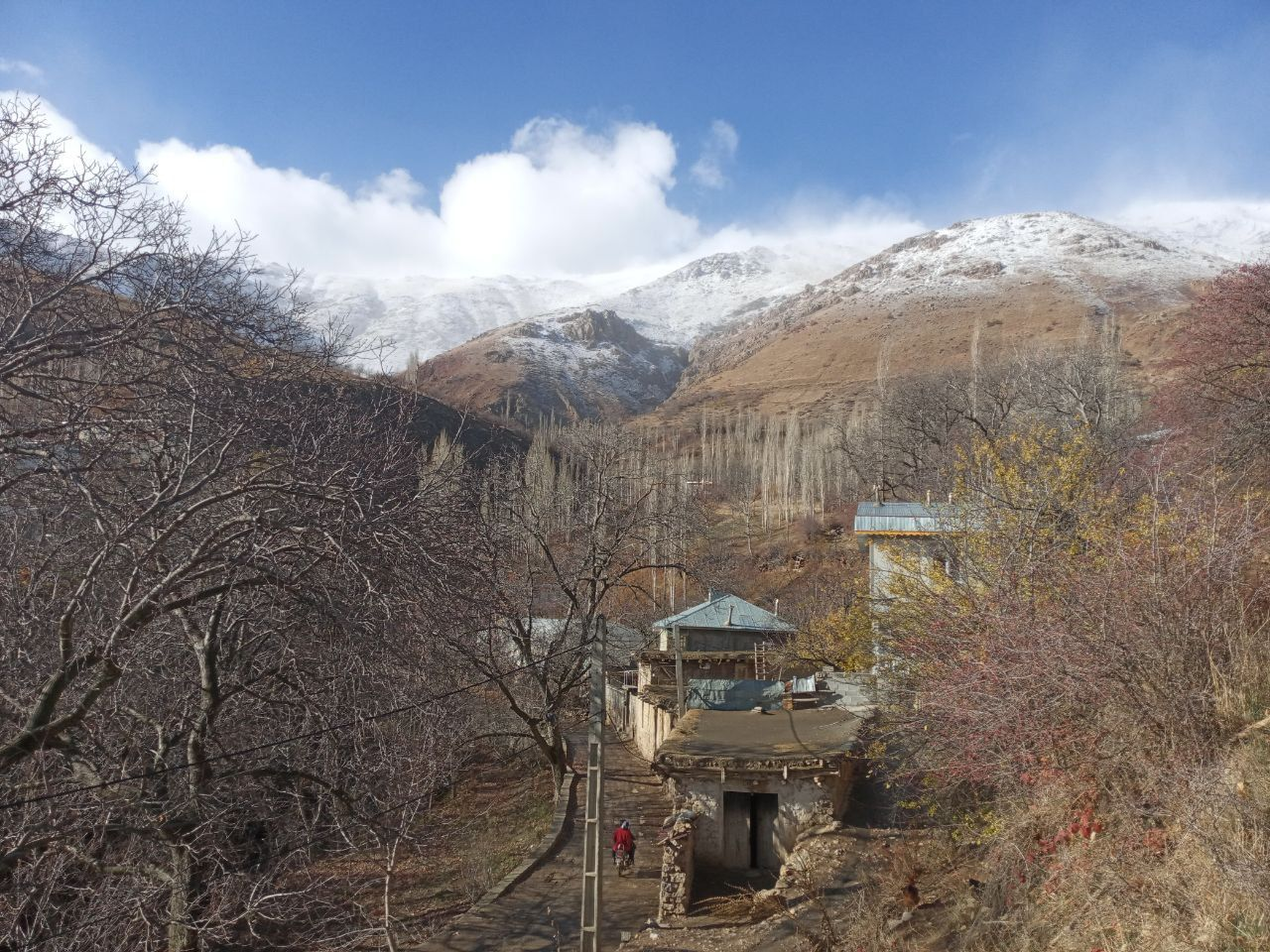

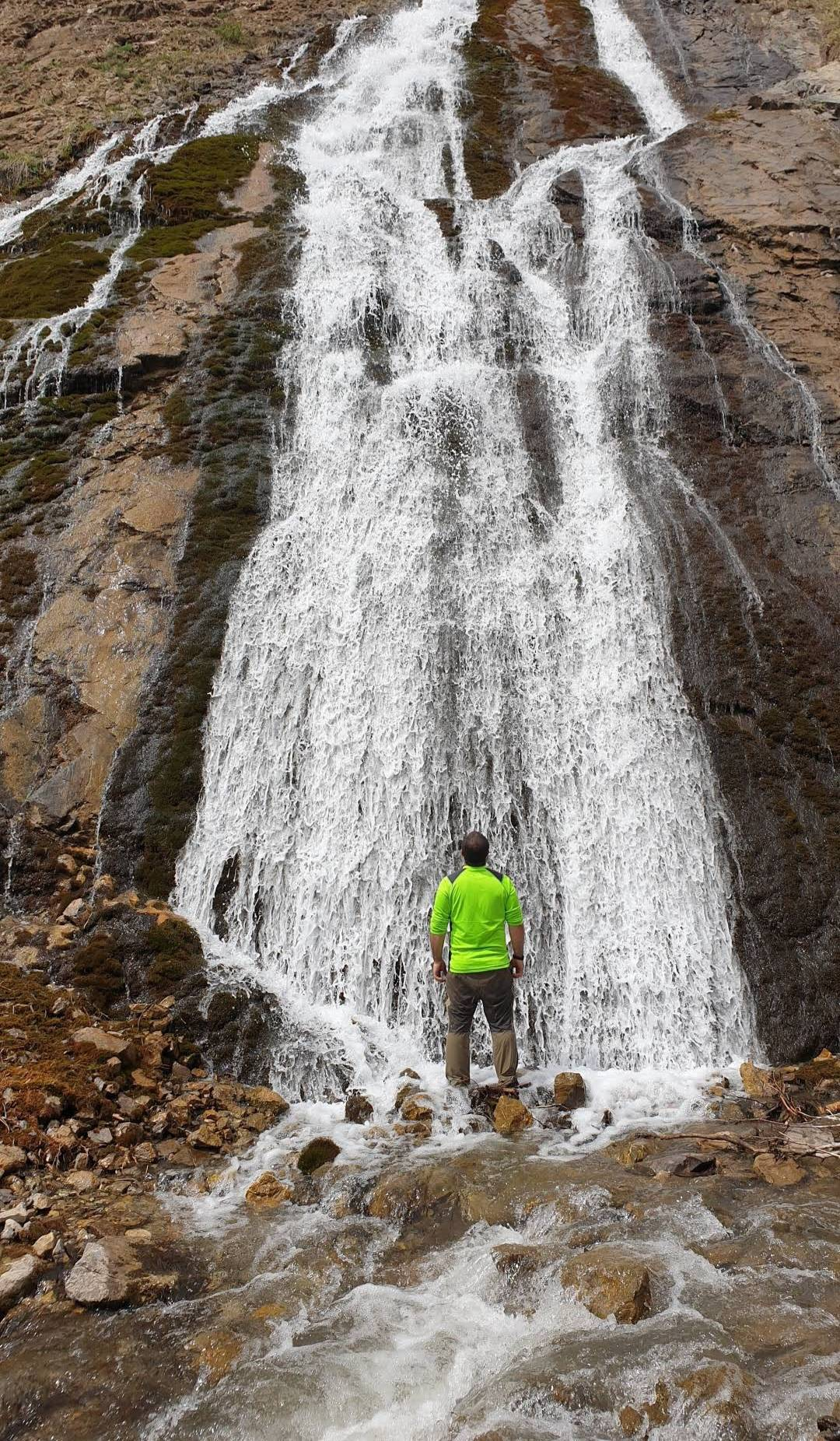
Sibieh Khani is one of the most popular tourist destinations in Ardabil province and Lerd's tourist village.

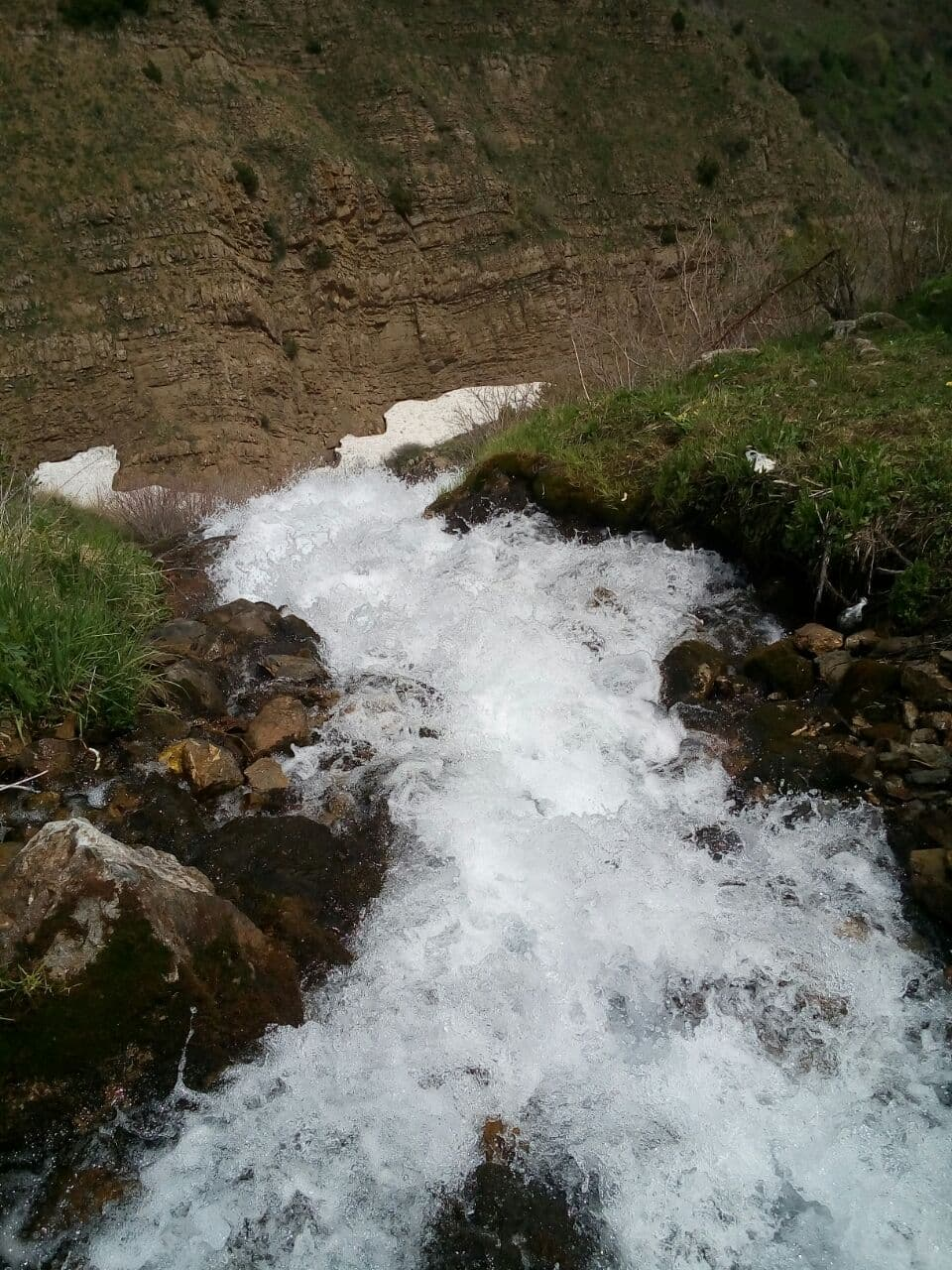
Sibieh Khani is one of the most popular tourist destinations in Ardabil province and Lerd's tourist village.

== See also ==
- Sibieh Khani Waterfall
- Khalkhal
- Tageo
