= Palanga Rural District =

Rural district in Ardabil province, Iran

Palanga Rural District Persian: دهستان پلنگا
- Rural District
- Location within Iran
- Coordinates: 37°20′N 48°38′E
- Country: Iran
- Province: Ardabil
- County: Khalkhal
- District: Shahrud
- Established: 1987
- Capital: Karin

Population (2016)
  - Total: 5,000
- Time zone: UTC+3:30 (IRST)

Palanga Rural District (Persian: دهستان پلنگا) is in Shahrud District of Khalkhal County, Ardabil province, Iran. Its capital is the village of Karin.

== Demographics ==
=== Population ===
At the time of the 2006 National Census, the rural district's population was 5,067 in 1,202 households. There were 5,619 inhabitants in 1,475 households in the following census of 2011. The 2016 census measured the population of the rural district as 5,000 in 1,549 households. The most populous of its seven villages was Lerd, with 3,226 people.

=== Other villages in the rural district ===
- Azizabad
- Farajabad
- Mian Rudan
- Til
