= Shapouri House =

Historic house in Shiraz, Iran

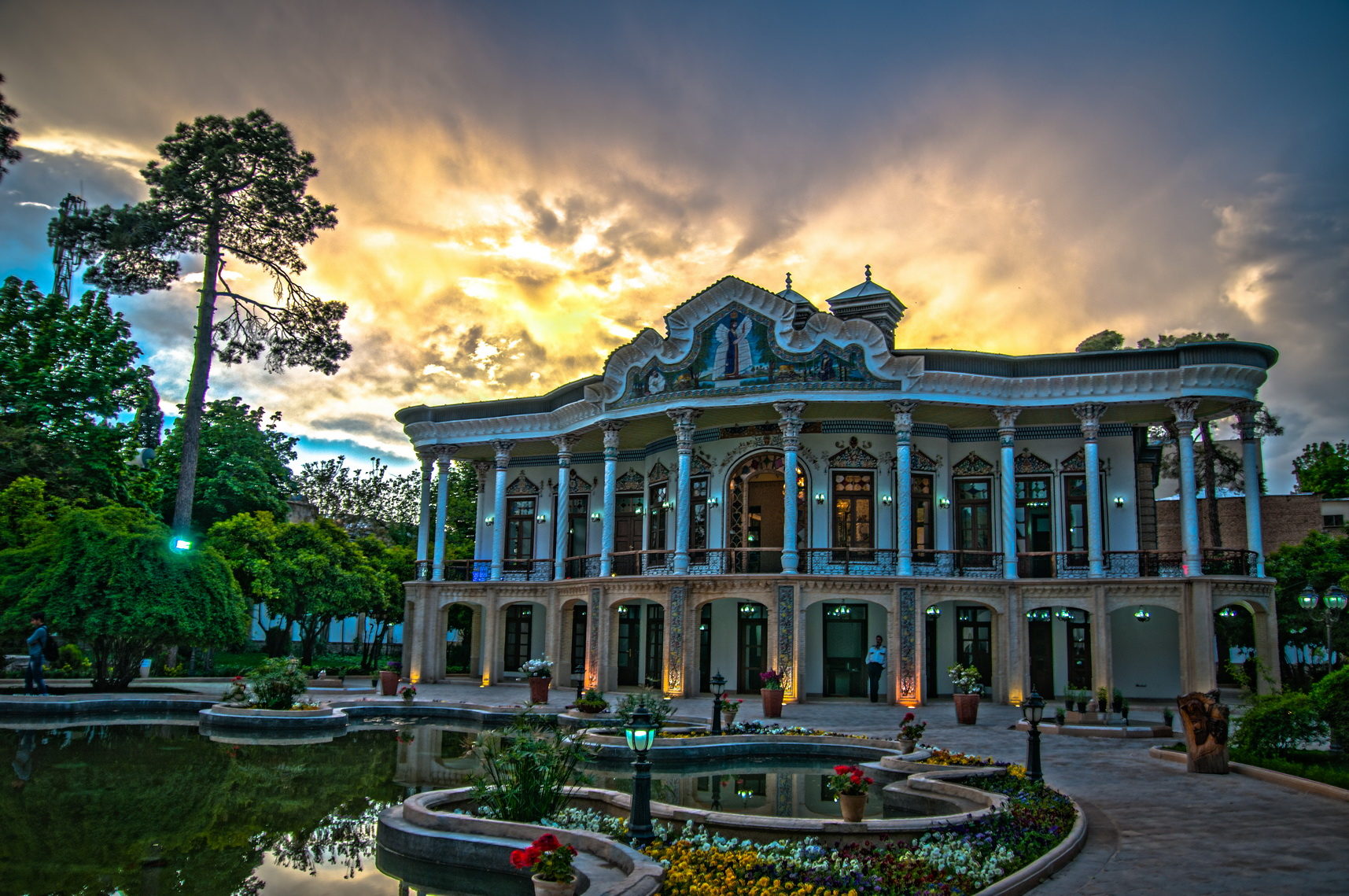
- Interactive map of Shapouri House
- Location: Shiraz, Iran

History
- Built for: Abdolsaheb Shapouri

Site notes
- Architect: Abolghasem Mohandesi

Shapouri House (Persian: خانه شاپوری) is an early 20th-century building and garden in the city of Shiraz, Iran. It was designed by Abolghasem Mohandesi and built in the early Pahlavi era between 1930 and 1935; the owner was Abdolsaheb Shapouri, a wealthy Iranian merchant.

The house is located in central Shiraz, in an area known as Anvari. It has 840 square metres of underpinning and 4635 square metres of garden area, and is built in two floors. It was registered as a national building in 2000 with registration number 2781.

== Gallery ==
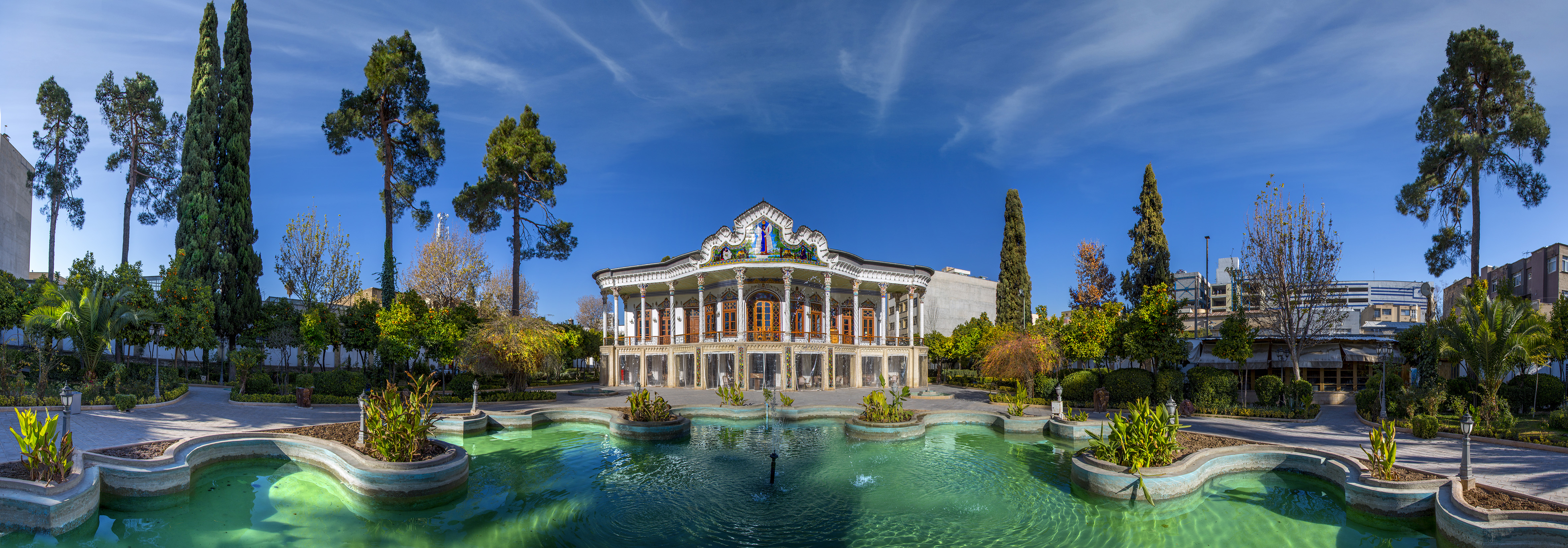
Panoramic image of Shapouri House

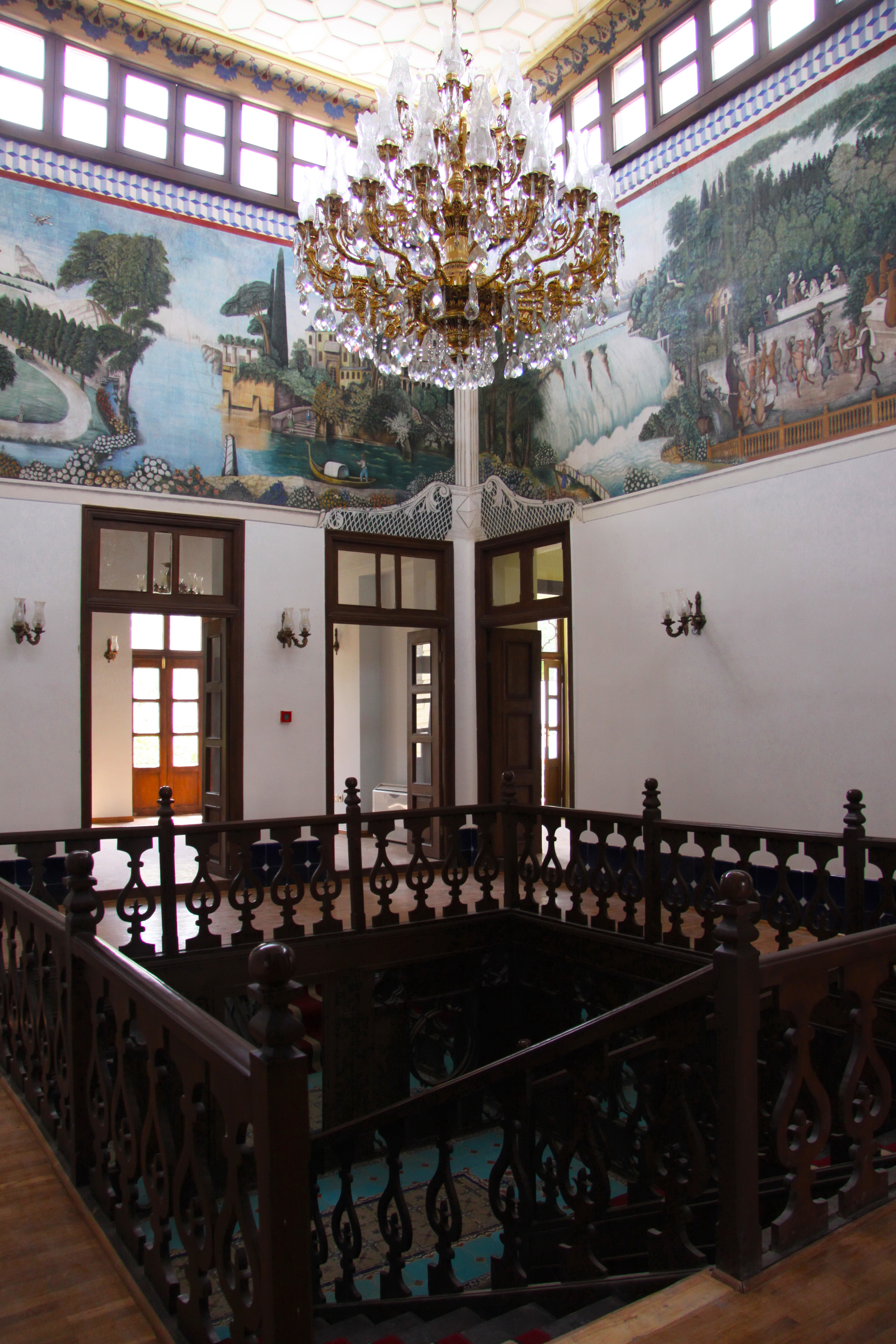
Interior

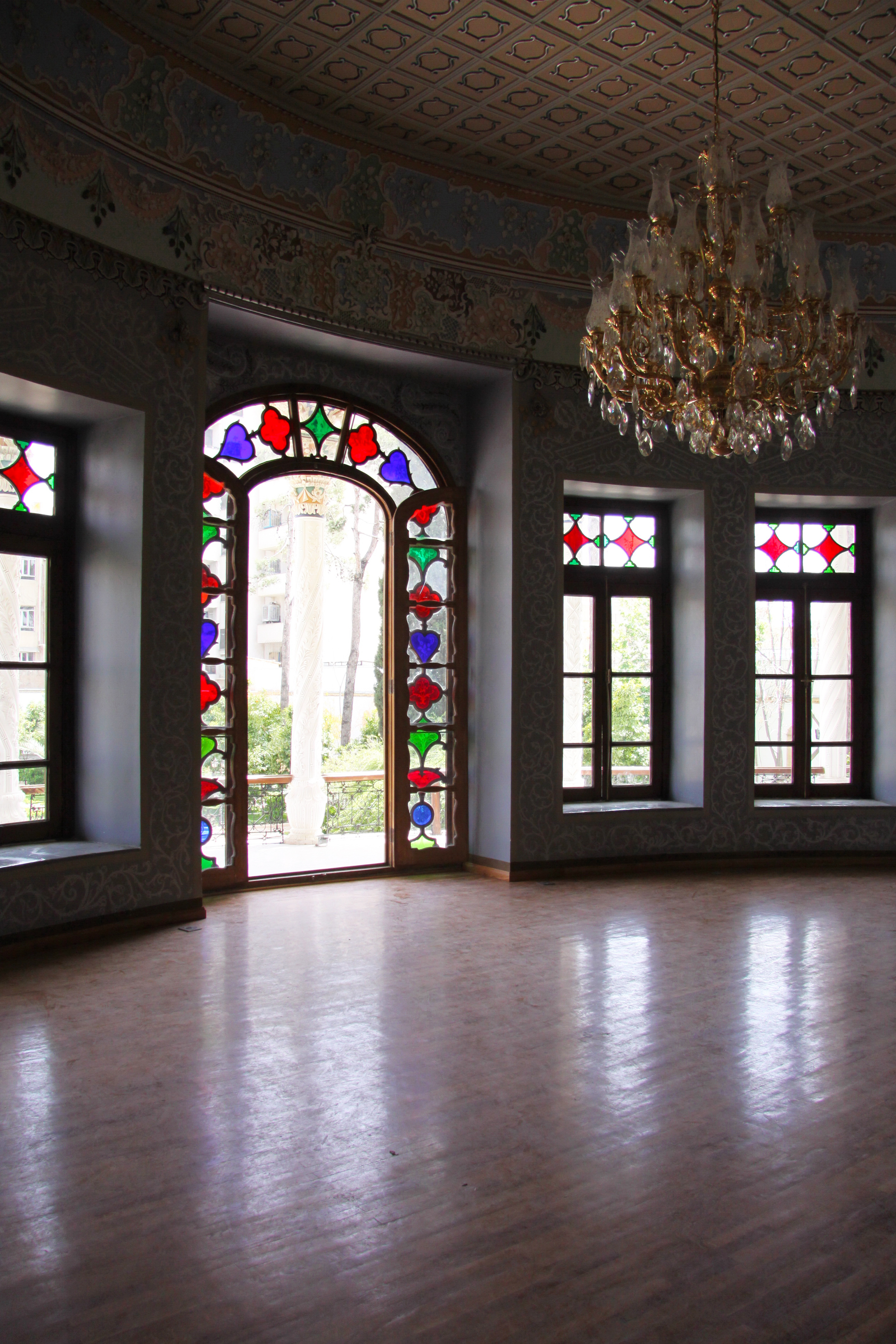
Interior
