= Esbu, Mazandaran =

Coordinates: 37°26′43″N 48°40′10″E

Asbu اسبو
- Village
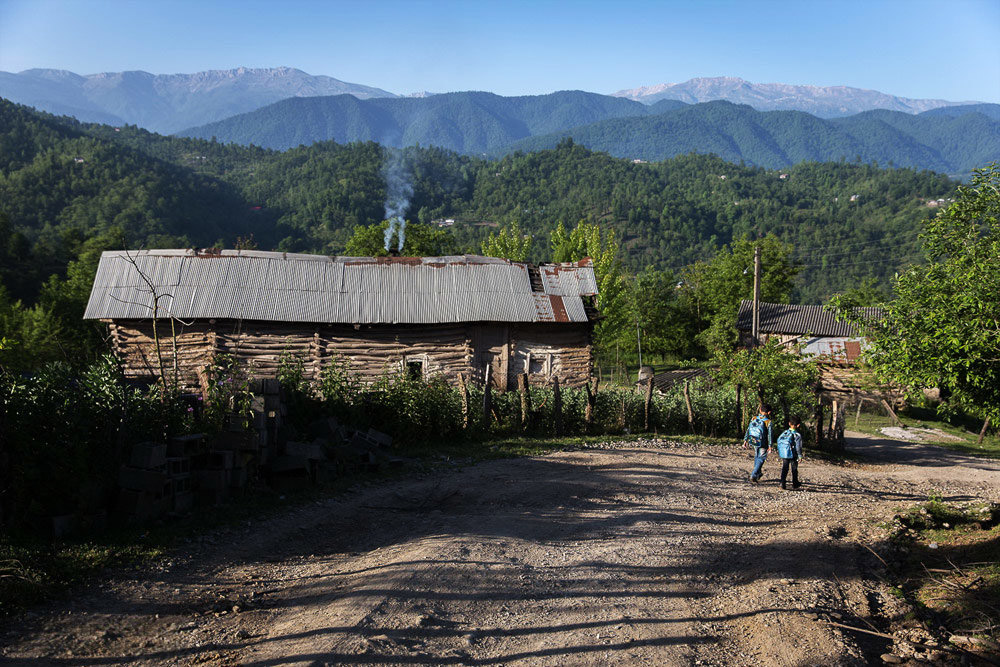
- Interactive map of Asbu
- Country: Iran
- Province: Mazandaran
- County: Babol
- Bakhsh: Bandpey-ye Sharqi
- Rural District: Sajjadrud

Population (2006)
  - Total: 161
- Time zone: UTC+3:30 (IRST)
  - Summer (DST): UTC+4:30 (IRDT)

Esbu (Persian: اسبو, also Romanized as Esbū) is a village in Sajjadrud Rural District, Bandpey-ye Sharqi District, Babol County, Mazandaran Province, Iran. At the 2006 census, its population was 161, in 39 families.
