= Shahrud District =

District in Ardabil province, Iran

Shahrud District Persian: بخش شاهرود
- District
- Location within Iran
- Coordinates: 37°21′N 48°43′E
- Country: Iran
- Province: Ardabil
- County: Khalkhal
- Capital: Kolowr

Population (2016)
  - Total: 11,770
- Time zone: UTC+3:30 (IRST)

Shahrud District (Persian: بخش شاهرود) is in Khalkhal County, Ardabil province, Iran. Its capital is the city of Kolowr. The district is in the Alborz (Elburz) mountain range.

== Demographics ==
=== Language ===
Tati is the main language of the district.

=== Population ===
At the time of the 2006 National Census, the district's population was 13,701 in 3,604 households. The following census in 2011 counted 12,650 people in 3,693 households. The 2016 census measured the population of the district as 11,770 inhabitants living in 3,977 households.

=== Administrative divisions ===
Shahrud District Population
Administrative Divisions	2006	2011	2016
Palanga RD	5,067	5,619	5,000
Shahrud RD	1,864	1,423	1,213
Shal RD	4,390	3,503	3,210
Kolowr (city)	2,380	2,105	2,347
Total	13,701	12,650	11,770
RD = Rural District

== See also ==
- Alborz (Elburz) mountain range topics
