= List of cities, towns and villages in Hamadan province =

A list of cities, towns and villages in Hamadan Province of west-central Iran:

== Alphabetical ==
Cities are in bold text; all others are villages.

=== A ===
Ab Anbar | Ab Barik | Ab Barik | Ab Hendu | Ab Meshkin | Abarlaq-e Olya | Abarlaq-e Sofla | Abaru | Abbasabad | Abbasabad | Abbasiyeh | Abd ol Maleki | Abd ol Mowmen | Abdalan | Abdar | Abdol Rahim | Abdolabad | Abrumand | Abshineh | Abu Darda | Abu ol Fathabad | Aghcheh Kharabeh | Aghcheh Qayah | Ahmadabad | Ahmadabad | Ahmadabad | Ahmadabad | Ahmadabad | Ahmadabad | Ahmadabad-e Daryab | Ahmadabad-e Olya | Ahmadabad-e Tappeh | Ahmadiyeh | Ahu Tappeh | Ajin | Ajorlu | Akanlu | Akbarabad | Akbarabad | Akbarabad | Akbarabad | Akhtachi | Akleh | Alamdar | Alamdar-e Olya | Alamdar-e Sofla | Alan-e Olya | Alan-e Sofla | Alanjeh | Alavi | Alfavut | Ali Morad Khvah | Ali Sadr | Aliabad | Aliabad | Aliabad | Aliabad | Aliabad-e Aq Hesar | Aliabad-e Ayvora | Aliabad-e Damaq | Aliabad-e Pir Shams ol Din | Aliabad-e Posht Shahr | Aliabad-e Varkaneh | Alijuq | Aminabad | Aminabad | Aminabad | Aminabad | Amir ol Omara | Amirabad | Amirabad | Amirabad | Amirabad | Amirabad-e Ali Nur | Amirabad-e Kord | Amiriyeh | Amzajerd | Anbar Qanbar | Anjir Baghi | Anjireh | Ansar ol Emam | Ansar | Anuch | Aq Bolagh | Aq Bolagh-e Aqdaq | Aq Bolagh-e Latgah | Aq Bolagh-e Morshed | Aq Chay | Aq Darreh | Aq Dash | Aq Kahriz | Aq Kand | Aq Kand | Aq Tappeh | Aq Tappeh | Aqa Bolaghi | Aqa Jan Bolaghi | Aqaj | Aqcheh Kharabeh | Aqchelu | Aqdash | Aqdash | Arablu | Arges-e Olya | Arges-e Sofla | Arikan | Arpa Darreh | Arteh Bolagh | Artiman | Arzan Fud | Arzuvaj | Asadabad | Asadabad | Asgarabad | Ashaq Qaleh | Ashmizan | Asleh | Avarzaman | Ayvora | Azandarian | Azim Darreh | Aznahri

=== B ===
Baba Ali | Baba Hesari | Baba Kamal | Baba Khanjar | Baba Nazar | Baba Pir | Baba Pir Ali | Baba Qasem | Baba Rais | Baba Rostam | Baba Rud | Baban | Babolqani | Bad Khvoreh | Badamak | Badiabad | Badkuh | Baghcheh Ghaz | Baghcheh | Baghcheh | Bahar | Baharab | Bahareh | Bahramabad | Balajub | Band Aman | Banesareh | Baqerabad | Baraband | Barakatabad | Barfiyan | Bargecheh | Barjak | Barreh Farakh | Barzul | Bashirabad | Bashqurtaran | Bazeran | Behkandan | Belartu | Beshik Tappeh | Biaj | Bian | Biatan-e Olya | Biatan-e Sofla | Bid Korpeh-ye Olya | Bid Korpeh-ye Sofla | Bid Korpeh-ye Vosta | Bifanaj | Bighash | Bish Aghaj | Bitervan | Borjaki | Boyukabad | Bozineh Jerd | Bujan | Bujin | Buli Industrial Estate | Bur | Burbur | Buyaqchi

=== C ===
Chahar Bolagh | Chahar Cheshmeh | Chahar Suq | Chahar Taq | Chal Boqa | Chaleh Kand | Challu | Cham Kabud | Changarin | Charoq | Chashin | Chasht Khvoreh | Chayan | Chayan | Chenaran | Chenar-e Olya | Chenar-e Sofla | Chenari | Cheshmeh Ali | Cheshmeh Kabud | Cheshmeh Kabud | Cheshmeh Mahi | Cheshmeh Malek | Cheshmeh Pahn | Cheshmeh Pahn-e Nanaj | Cheshmeh Qandab | Cheshmeh Qassaban | Cheshmeh Saran | Cheshmeh Valad | Cheshmeh Zowraq | Cheshmeh-ye Ali Mohammad | Chopoqlu | Chopoqlu | Chopoqlu | Choqa Sarahi | Chowtash | Chulak Qapanuri | Chulak-e Asali | Churmaq | Churmaq

=== D ===
Dahnejerd | Daillar | Dali Chu | Damaq | Daqdaqabad | Dar Qeshlaq | Darani-ye Olya | Darani-ye Sofla | Darband | Darcham | Darreh Chenar | Darreh Mianeh-ye Olya | Darreh Mianeh-ye Sofla | Darreh Mirza | Darreh Rast | Darreh-ye Ebrahim | Darreh-ye Omid Ali | Darsibeh | Darvaz | Daryab | Das Qaleh | Dashtabad | Dashteh | Dastjerd | Dastjerd | Davijan | Deh Bureh | Deh Bureh | Deh Chaneh | Deh Choqai | Deh Dalian | Deh Ful | Deh Golan | Deh Mianeh | Deh Musa | Deh Now | Deh Now | Deh Now-e Abd ol Maleki | Deh Now-e Olya | Deh Now-e Sofla | Deh Nush | Deh Piaz | Deh Sefid | Deh Sorkheh | Deh-e Heydar | Deh-e Qarah Chay | Deh-e Shaker | Dehlaq | Dehlaq | Dehnow-e Aliabad | Dehnow-e Avarzaman | Dehqanabad-e Chulak | Dinarabad | Dingeleh Kahriz | Dizaj | Do Cheshmeh | Do Rudan | Doraneh | Dow Baraleh | Dowlai | Dowlatabad | Dowlatabad | Dowlatabad | Dowlatabad-e Hajjilu | Dowlujerdin-e Bala | Duli | Durijan | Durnian

=== E ===
Ebrahimabad | Emamzadeh Abdollah | Emamzadeh Khatun | Emamzadeh Pir Nahan | Emamzadeh Zeyyed | Eskanan | Eslamabad | Eslamabad | Eynabad | Eynabad | Eynabad | Eznav | Eznav | Eznaveleh

=== F ===
Fahrumand | Famenin | Farasfaj | Farmaniyeh | Farsban | Farsejin | Farvaz | Faryazan | Fasijan | Fathabad | Feyzabad | Fiazaman | Firuzabad | Firuzabad | Firuzabad-e Sofla | Firuzabad-e Tayemeh | Firuzan

=== G ===
Gamasa | Gamasb | Gamin Qaleh | Ganj Dar | Ganj Tappeh | Ganjab | Ganjeh | Gara Choqa | Gareh Choqa | Garjai | Garmak | Gashani | Gav Savar | Gav Zaban | Gavanlu | Gavanlu | Gavkaran | Gerd-e Cham | Gerdian | Ghazyatan | Gholamali | Gilabad | Givaki | Giyan | Godar Pahn | Gol Darreh-ye Anuch | Gol Gol | Gol Heydar | Gol Khondan | Gol Tappeh | Golabad | Goldasteh | Gol-e Zard | Goliyan | Golparabad | Golshir | Golushjerd | Gomush Bolagh | Gonbad Chay | Gonbad | Gonbad | Gonbadan | Gonbad-e Kabud | Gonbaleh | Gonbaleh | Gondeh Jin | Gondeh Jin | Gonduz | Gostar | Gozal Abdal | Gozar Gajin | Gug Tappeh | Gujak | Gulvand | Gur Gaz | Gurjiu | Gushalan | Gusheh-ye Badi ol Zaman | Gusheh-ye Kasavand | Gusheh-ye Sad-e Vaqas

=== H ===
Habashi | Habibabad | Hadiabad | Hajji Kheder | Hajji Maqsud | Hajji Tu | Hajjiabad | Hajjiabad | Hajjiabad | Hajjiabad | Hajjiabad-e Kark | Hakan | Hamadan | Hamadan Garrison | Hameh Kasi | Hameh Kasi | Hamilabad | Hamzehlu-ye Olya | Hamzehlu-ye Sofla | Haramabad | Harunabad | Haryan | Hasan Abdal | Hasan Kusej | Hasan Qeshlaq | Hasan Teymur | Hasanabad | Hasanabad | Hasanabad-e Emam | Hasanabad-e Qush Bolagh | Hasanabad-e Sheverin | Hatamabad | Heriraz | Hesamabad | Hesamabad | Hesar-e Qarah Baghi | Hesar-e Qujeh Baghi | Heydarabad | Heydareh-ye Dar-e Emam | Heydareh-ye Posht-e Shahr | Heyran | Hezar Jerib | Hizaj | Holvar-e Olya | Holvar-e Sofla | Hom-e Khosrow | Horhoreh | Hoseynabad Gian | Hoseynabad | Hoseynabad | Hoseynabad | Hoseynabad-e Baba Khanjar | Hoseynabad-e Bahar | Hoseynabad-e Chulak | Hoseynabad-e Latka | Hoseynabad-e Nazem | Hoseynabad-e Serkan | Hoseynabad-e Shamlu | Hudaraj | Hush

=== I ===
Idahlu | Idahlu | Ilanlu | Iraneh | Istgah-e Mokhabarati Shahid Qandi | Isti Bolagh | Ivak

=== J ===
Jafarabad | Jafarabad | Jafarabad | Jafarabad | Jafariyeh | Jaganlu | Jahadabad | Jahanabad | Jahanabad | Jamishlu | Jamshidabad | Jannatabad | Jaria | Javar Sajin | Jazvan | Jera | Jerbanlu | Jeyhunabad | Jighi | Jijan Kuh | Jijian Rud | Jin Taraqayah | Jowkar | Jowzan | Jurab | Juraqan

=== K ===
Kabudrahang | Kafraj | Kahard | Kahkadan | Kahriz | Kahriz-e Baba Hoseyn | Kahriz-e Boqazi | Kahriz-e Hoseynabad-e Nazem | Kahriz-e Jamal | Kahriz-e Salah ol Din | Kahriz-e Salim | Kaj | Kal Kabud | Kalb Hesari | Kalilabad | Kalleh Sar | Kallik | Kamak-e Olya | Kamak-e Sofla | Kamalvand | Kamandan | Kamankaran | Kamar Boneh | Kamari | Kamazan | Kand Halan | Kand Tappeh | Kand-e Bolaghi | Kangavar-e Kohneh | Kanjvaran-e Olya | Kanjvaran-e Sofla | Kanjvaran-e Vosta | Karafs | Karak | Karateh-ye Vasaj | Karimabad | Karimabad | Karimabad | Karkan | Kark-e Olya | Kark-e Sofla | Karkhaneh | Karkhaneh-ye Qand | Kartilabad | Karvaneh | Kasavand | Kaslan Qayah | Kavanaj | Kerdabad | Kesb | Keykaleh | Keyni Sayeh | Khabar Arkhi | Khakriz | Khaku | Khalaj | Khalatabad | Khaleq Verdi | Khalil Kord | Khanjarabad | Khedri | Kheradmand | Kheyr Qoli | Kheyrabad | Kheyrabad | Kheyrabad | Kheyrabad | Khimeh Gah | Khomajin | Khomajin | Khomeygan | Khondab | Khvajeh Hesar | Khvajeh Hoseyni | Khvajeh Kandi | Khvorvandeh | Khvoshabad | Khvoshab-e Olya | Khvoshab-e Sofla | Kitu | Kohneh Hesar | Kohnush | Kolanjan | Koleh Bid | Kollijah | Kondor | Konjineh | Korzan | Kowzareh | Kuhani | Kuhin | Kur Kahriz | Kurijan | Kusaj Khalil | Kushkabad | Kutah Darreh | Kuy Bolagh

=== L ===
Lak Lak | Lak | Laleh Dan | Lalejin | Lamiyan | Latgah | Latif | Lavashan | Leylan | Leyli Yadegar | Lilas | Luluhar

=== M ===
Madabad | Madan Kuh | Mahanabad | Mahbar | Mahdaviyeh | Mahmudabad | Mahmudabad | Mahmudabad | Mahmudabad | Mahmudabad | Mahmudiyeh | Mahmudvand | Mahnian | Malayer | Malayer Industrial Estate | Malek-e Ashtar | Malian | Malicheh | Malicheh | Malusan | Mangavi | Manizan | Mansurabad | Manuchehr | Marta Bolagh | Marvil | Maryanaj | Masalhan | Masjedin | Mavi | Mazraeh-ye Bid | Mazraeh-ye Deymur | Mazraeh-ye Givdarreh | Mazraeh-ye Mehdiabad | Mazraeh-ye Sarem | Mehdiabad | Mehdiabad | Mehrabad | Menjan | Mesinak | Meyvaleh | Mian Deh | Mianabad | Miangaran | Mianzulan | Mihamleh-ye Olya | Mihamleh-ye Sofla | Milab | Milajerd | Minabad | Mirza Hesari | Mirzaiyeh | Mishen | Mobarakabad | Mobarakabad | Mobarakabad | Mobarakin | Mohajarabad | Mohajeran | Mohammadabad | Mohammadabad-e Chulak | Mohammadi | Mohammadiyeh-e Olya | Mohammadiyeh-e Sofla | Mohara | Mokarrabi | Mokhvor | Molham Darreh | Molla Bodagh | Molla Vali | Monavvar Tappeh | Moradabad | Moradabad | Morghabad | Moslemabad | Motamedabad | Motasemabad | Mowdaran | Muijin | Musa Bolaghi | Musaabad | Musaabad

=== N ===
Nahandar | Nahavand | Nahran | Najafabad | Najafabad | Najafiyeh | Nakilabad | Nakin | Namazgah | Namileh | Nanaj | Nasehabad | Naserabad | Nasirabad | Navar | Nazul | Negar Khatun | Negarabad | Nehenjeh | Nematabad | Nesar | Neshar | Nezamabad | Niyanj | Niyar | Noqaddeh | Nosratabad | Nosratabad-e Behraz | Nosratabad-e Laklak | Now Deh | Now Deh | Nowabad | Nozheh Air Base | Nurabad-e Hajjilu | Nurabad-e Simineh

=== O ===
Ojaq | Omman | Ommatlar | Omrabad | Ordaklu | Oshshaq | Oshtoran | Oshtorjin | Oshtormel | Oshvand | Ovraqin | Owliai | Owrteh Qamish | Owryad | Ozundarreh

=== P ===
Pa Tappeh-ye Gunesban | Pahnabad | Pahneh Bar | Panbeh Dar | Pariyan | Parluk | Parvaraq | Pavan | Payandeh | Peyhan | Pileh Jin | Pir Anbar | Pir Badam | Pir Beg | Pir Gheyb | Pir Khodaverdi | Pir Malu | Pir Mishan | Pir Savaran | Pir Shams ol Din | Pir Yusof | Piruz | Pol Shekasteh | Pol-e Shekasteh | Poli Kan | Poshtjin

=== Q ===
Qabanqoli | Qabaq Tappeh | Qabaq Tappeh-ye Kord | Qader Khalaj | Qaderabad | Qaderabad | Qadimi | Qahavand | Qajar Ab-e Olya | Qajar Ab-e Sofla | Qaleh Juq | Qaleh Now | Qaleh Now-e Gunesban | Qaleh Nowruz | Qaleh Qazi | Qaleh-ye Astijan | Qaleh-ye Baba Khan | Qaleh-ye Bakhtiar | Qaleh-ye Barudab | Qaleh-ye Fattahiyeh | Qaleh-ye Jowzan | Qaleh-ye Juq Zamani | Qaleh-ye Kartilabad | Qaleh-ye Qobad | Qaleh-ye Shater Bali | Qaleh-ye Sheykh | Qaleh-ye Zendlij | Qaleh-ye Zorati | Qanqanlu | Qara Gol | Qara Kand | Qara Qayeh | Qarah Aghaj | Qarah Bolagh | Qarah Bolagh | Qarah Day | Qarah Tegini | Qarakand | Qaranqu Darreh | Qaratlu | Qaraylar | Qasabestan | Qasemabad | Qasemabad | Qasemabad | Qasemabad-e Laklak | Qatar Aghaj | Qatar Qui | Qater Owlan | Qayesh | Qazi Mardan | Qelish Baghi | Qepchaq | Qerkh Bolagh | Qerkhlar | Qeshlaq Baba Rostam | Qeshlaq | Qeshlaq-e Anuch | Qeshlaq-e Deh Ful | Qeshlaq-e Dehnow | Qeshlaq-e Gomar | Qeshlaq-e Hameh Kasi | Qeshlaq-e Mohammadi | Qeshlaq-e Najaf | Qeshlaq-e Olya | Qeshlaq-e Pust Shuran | Qeshlaq-e Qobad | Qeshlaq-e Shirazi | Qeshlaq-e Sofla | Qeshlaq-e Valiollah | Qeydli Bolagh | Qeynarjeh | Qezel Hesar | Qezelabad | Qezeljeh | Qezeljeh | Qezeljeh-ye Khorqan | Qilab | Qohurd-e Olya | Qohurd-e Sofla | Qoli Kandi | Qoli Laleh-ye Olya | Qoli Laleh-ye Sofla | Qoliabad | Qolqol | Qolqolabad | Qomshaneh | Qomshaneh | Qorveh-e Darjazin | Quch Tappeh | Qurjineh | Qushijeh | Qushjeh | Quzan | Quzlijeh | Quzlijeh

=== R ===
Rah Hamvar | Rahimabad | Rahjerd | Rahmanabad-e Anuch | Rakin | Ramishan | Rastguyan | Rasulabad-e Olya | Rasulabad-e Sofla | Ravan | Ravand-e Olya | Ravand-e Vosta | Rayegan-e Olya | Rayegan-e Sofla | Razaj | Razan | Raziabad | Razin | Razini | Reza Baghi | Rezvankadeh | Rivasijan | Robat-e Sheverin | Robat-e Zafarani | Rostamabad | Rowan | Rud Avar | Rudbari | Rud-e Hasan-e Olya | Rud-e Hasan-e Sofla

=== S ===
Sabzabad | Sadatabad | Sadd-e Ekbatan | Sad-e Vaqas | Sadeqabad | Sadeqabad-e Qapanuri | Sadeqlu | Safa Riz | Sahamabad | Salehabad | Salilak | Salim Sarai | Saluk | Samavak | Samen | Samiran | Sanaj | Sang Garan Kuh | Sangdeh | Sang-e Sefid | Sang-e Sefid | Sang-e Sefid-e Nanaj | Sangestan | Sanjuzan | Sar Duran | Sarab | Sarab-e Tajar | Saravak | Saray | Sarayjuq | Sarbanlar | Sardarabad | Sari Bolagh | Sari Qamish | Sarijlu | Sarkan | Sarlah | Sayan | Saziyan | Sefid Khaneh | Segavi | Seydabad | Seyfabad | Seyyed Shahab | Shaban | Shad Kandi | Shademaneh | Shahrab | Shahrak | Shahrestaneh | Shamsabad | Shanabad | Shanjur | Sharifabad | Sharifabad-e Quzan | Sharifabad-e Tajar | Shatzal | Shavand | Shaveh | Sheverin | Sheykh Jarrah | Shilandar-e Sofla | Shir Barat | Shirabad | Shiravand | Shirin Su | Shirinabad | Shirinabad | Showqabad | Shush Ab | Siah Choqa | Siah Darreh | Siah Darreh-ye Olya | Siah Goleh | Siah Kamar | Sib Dar | Silak | Silvar | Simin-e Abaru | Simin-e Zagheh | Sirab | Siravand | Sirdarreh | Sistaneh | Sohran | Soleymanabad | Soltanabad | Solulan | Sonqorabad | Sorkh Kand | Sorkh Lijeh | Sorkhab | Sorkhabad | Subashi | Sulijeh | Suri | Surtajin | Sutlaq | Suzan

=== T ===
Tafrijan | Taherlu | Tahunabad | Tajarak | Tajar-e Alavi | Tajar-e Samen | Takht | Takhtiabad | Takyeh | Taleh Jerd-e Olya | Taleh Jerd-e Sofla | Tamachi | Tamuzan | Tappeh Ali | Tappeh Yazdan | Tappeh-ye Dibi | Taqiabad | Taraqayah | Tarik Darreh-ye Bala | Tarik Darreh-ye Pain | Tarkhinabad | Tas Tappeh | Tasbandi | Tasran | Tavaleh | Tavaneh | Taveh | Tavilan-e Olya | Tavilan-e Sofla | Tayemeh | Tayemeh | Tazeh Kand | Tazeh Kand | Tazehnab-e Mohammad Baqer | Tazehnab-e Olya | Tazehnab-e Sofla | Tazehnab-e Vosta | Tekkeh | Termianak | Timi Jan | Tokmeh Dash | Tuchaqaz | Tui Jin | Tulki Tappeh | Tusk-e Olya | Tusk-e Sofla | Tutal | Tuyserkan

=== U ===
Uch Tappeh | Uch Tappeh

=== V ===
Vafr-e Jin | Vafs | Vahandeh | Vahman | Vahnan | Valashejerd | Vali Mohammad | Vali Sir Ab | Valiabad | Vandarabad | Varayeneh | Varazaneh | Varchaq | Vardavard-e Olya | Vardavard-e Sofla | Vardavard-e Vosta | Varkaneh | Varkesh | Varqestan | Varvazin | Vasaj | Vashan | Vashur | Vasleh | Vasmaq | Velashjerd | Vesht | Veyar | Vezendan | Vian | Virai

=== Y ===
Yalfan | Yaqubabad | Yarom Qayah | Yaromjeh Bagh | Yeganeh | Yekanabad | Yekleh | Yengejeh | Yengejeh-ye Karafs | Yengi Kand | Yengi Qaleh | Yeserlu | Yunes | Yunji | Yusefabad | Yushanlu

=== Z ===
Zafarabad | Zagheh | Zagheh-ye Anuch | Zaghlijeh | Zakan | Zamanabad | Zamanabad | Zamanabad-e Mohammadabad | Zangeneh | Zangeneh-ye Sofla | Zapon | Zaramin-e Olya | Zaramin-e Sofla | Zaraqan | Zarb Ali | Zareabad | Zarrin Bagh | Zeraq | Zereshgi | Zinabad | Zirabiyeh
