= Kahriz-e Jamal =

Kahriz-e Jamal كهريزجمال
- Village
- Location within Iran
- Coordinates: 34°20′06″N 48°08′46″E
- Country: Iran
- Province: Hamadan
- County: Nahavand
- Bakhsh: Khezel
- Rural District: Khezel-e Sharqi

Population (2006)
  - Total: 382
- Time zone: UTC+3:30 (IRST)
  - Summer (DST): UTC+4:30 (IRDT)

Kahriz-e Jamal (Persian: كهريزجمال, also Romanized as Kahrīz-e Jamāl and Kahrīz Jamāl; also known as Kahrīz-e Jamāl od Dīn) is a village in Khezel-e Sharqi Rural District, Khezel District, Nahavand County, Hamadan Province, Iran. At the 2006 census, its population was 382, in 91 families.
