= Kand-e Bolaghi =

Kand-e Bolaghi كندبلاغي
- Village
- Location within Iran
- Coordinates: 35°25′48″N 48°19′22″E
- Country: Iran
- Province: Hamadan
- County: Kabudarahang
- Bakhsh: Shirin Su
- Rural District: Shirin Su

Population (2006)
  - Total: 221
- Time zone: UTC+3:30 (IRST)
  - Summer (DST): UTC+4:30 (IRDT)

Kand-e Bolaghi (Persian: كندبلاغي, also Romanized as Kand-e Bolāghī and Kand Bolāghī; also known as Gonbad Bolaghi, Kand Bulākhe, and Kand-e Bolāqī) is a village in Shirin Su Rural District, Shirin Su District, Kabudarahang County, Hamadan Province, Iran. At the 2006 census, its population was 221, in 47 families.
