= Dow Baraleh =

Dow Baraleh دوبراله
- Village
- Location within Iran
- Coordinates: 34°54′08″N 48°02′01″E
- Country: Iran
- Province: Hamadan
- County: Asadabad
- Bakhsh: Central
- Rural District: Chaharduli

Population (2006)
  - Total: 288
- Time zone: UTC+3:30 (IRST)
  - Summer (DST): UTC+4:30 (IRDT)

Dow Baraleh (Persian: دوبراله, also Romanized as Dow Barāleh, Dubarālah, Dūberāleh, and Do Barāleh; also known as Dobrāla) is a village in Chaharduli Rural District, in the Central District of Asadabad County, Hamadan Province, Iran. At the 2006 census, its population was 288, in 61 families.
