= Shirinabad, Malayer =

Shirinabad شيرين اباد
- Village
- Location within Iran
- Coordinates: 34°21′49″N 48°44′34″E
- Country: Iran
- Province: Hamadan
- County: Malayer
- Bakhsh: Central
- Rural District: Haram Rud-e Olya

Population (2006)
  - Total: 342
- Time zone: UTC+3:30 (IRST)
  - Summer (DST): UTC+4:30 (IRDT)

Shirinabad (Persian: شيرين اباد, also Romanized as Shīrīnābād) is a village in Haram Rud-e Olya Rural District, in the Central District of Malayer County, Hamadan Province, Iran. At the 2006 census, its population was 342, in 89 families.
