= Badkuh =

Badkuh بادكوه
- Village
- Location within Iran
- Coordinates: 35°29′15″N 49°04′46″E
- Country: Iran
- Province: Hamadan
- County: Razan
- Bakhsh: Central
- Rural District: Kharqan

Population (2006)
  - Total: 146
- Time zone: UTC+3:30 (IRST)
  - Summer (DST): UTC+4:30 (IRDT)

Badkuh (Persian: بادكوه, also Romanized as Bādkūh) is a village in Kharqan Rural District in the Central District of Razan County, Hamadan Province, Iran. In the 2006 census, its population was 146, residing in 37 families.
