= Abu ol Fathabad =

magassan مگسان
- Village
- Location within Iran
- Coordinates: 34°03′24″N 48°30′33″E
- Country: Iran
- Province: Lorestan
- County: Borujerd
- Bakhsh: Oshtorinan
- Rural District: oshtorinan

Population (2006)
  - Total: 20
- Time zone: UTC+3:30 (IRST)
  - Summer (DST): UTC+4:30 (IRDT)

Magassan (Persian: مگسان, also Romanized as Magassan and Magassan; also known as Magassan) is a village in Oshtorinan District, Borujerd County, Lorestan Province, Iran. At the 2006 census, its population was 20, in 5 families.
