= Kalb Hesari =

Kalb Hesari كلب حصاري
- Village
- Location within Iran
- Coordinates: 35°22′01″N 48°23′45″E
- Country: Iran
- Province: Hamadan
- County: Kabudarahang
- Bakhsh: Gol Tappeh
- Rural District: Ali Sadr

Population (2006)
  - Total: 168
- Time zone: UTC+3:30 (IRST)
  - Summer (DST): UTC+4:30 (IRDT)

Kalb Hesari (Persian: كلب حصاري, also Romanized as Kalb Ḩeşārī) is a village in Ali Sadr Rural District, Gol Tappeh District, Kabudarahang County, Hamadan Province, Iran. At the 2006 census, its population was 168, in 38 families.
