= Qeshlaq-e Valiollah =

Qeshlaq-e Valiollah قشلاق ولي اله
- Village
- Location within Iran
- Coordinates: 34°21′08″N 48°13′27″E
- Country: Iran
- Province: Hamadan
- County: Nahavand
- Bakhsh: Khezel
- Rural District: Khezel-e Sharqi

Population (2006)
  - Total: 85
- Time zone: UTC+3:30 (IRST)
  - Summer (DST): UTC+4:30 (IRDT)

Qeshlaq-e Valiollah (Persian: قشلاق ولي اله, also Romanized as Qeshlāq-e Valīollāh and Qeshlāq Valīollah) is a village in Khezel-e Sharqi Rural District, Khezel District, Nahavand County, Hamadan Province, Iran. At the 2006 census, its population was 85, in 19 families.
