= Qaleh-ye Astijan =

Qaleh-ye Astijan قلعه استيجان
- Village
- Location within Iran
- Coordinates: 34°40′42″N 48°19′29″E
- Country: Iran
- Province: Hamadan
- County: Tuyserkan
- Bakhsh: Central
- Rural District: Khorram Rud

Population (2006)
  - Total: 244
- Time zone: UTC+3:30 (IRST)
  - Summer (DST): UTC+4:30 (IRDT)

Qaleh-ye Astijan (Persian: قلعه استيجان, also Romanized as Qal‘eh-ye Āstījān; also known as Qal‘eh-ye Āsījān) is a village in Khorram Rud Rural District, in the Central District of Tuyserkan County, Hamadan Province, Iran. At the 2006 census, its population was 244, in 77 families.
