= Razaj =

Razaj رزج
- Village
- Location within Iran
- Coordinates: 34°53′43″N 49°08′48″E
- Country: Iran
- Province: Hamadan
- County: Hamadan
- Bakhsh: Shara
- Rural District: Jeyhun Dasht

Population (2006)
  - Total: 335
- Time zone: UTC+3:30 (IRST)
  - Summer (DST): UTC+4:30 (IRDT)

Razaj (Persian: رزج; also known as Razach) is a village in Jeyhun Dasht Rural District, Shara District, Hamadan County, Hamadan Province, Iran. At the 2006 census, its population was 335, in 67 families.
