= Deh Golan, Hamadan =

Deh Golan دهگلان
- Village
- Location within Iran
- Coordinates: 34°42′35″N 48°06′04″E
- Country: Iran
- Province: Hamadan
- County: Asadabad
- Bakhsh: Central
- Rural District: Seyyed Jamal ol Din

Population (2006)
  - Total: 234
- Time zone: UTC+3:30 (IRST)
  - Summer (DST): UTC+4:30 (IRDT)

Deh Golan (Persian: دهگلان, also Romanized as Deh Golān; also known as Deh Bozān) is a village in Seyyed Jamal ol Din Rural District, in the Central District of Asadabad County, Hamadan province, Iran. At the 2006 census, its population was 234, in 61 families.
