= Cheshmeh Valad =

Cheshmeh Valad چشمه ولد
- Village
- Location within Iran
- Coordinates: 34°52′41″N 47°59′02″E
- Country: Iran
- Province: Hamadan
- County: Asadabad
- Bakhsh: Central
- Rural District: Chaharduli

Population (2006)
  - Total: 54
- Time zone: UTC+3:30 (IRST)
  - Summer (DST): UTC+4:30 (IRDT)

Cheshmeh Valad (Persian: چشمه ولد) is a village in Chaharduli Rural District, in the Central District of Asadabad County, Hamadan Province, Iran. At the 2006 census, its population was 54, made up of 14 families.
