= Zaghlijeh =

Zaghlijeh زاغليجه
- Village
- Location within Iran
- Coordinates: 35°09′10″N 49°22′33″E
- Country: Iran
- Province: Hamadan
- County: Famenin
- Bakhsh: Pish Khowr
- Rural District: Pish Khowr

Population (2006)
  - Total: 95
- Time zone: UTC+3:30 (IRST)
  - Summer (DST): UTC+4:30 (IRDT)

Zaghlijeh (Persian: زاغليجه, also Romanized as Zāghlījeh; also known as Zāghalījeh, Zāghaljeh, and Zāgh Līcheh) is a village in Pish Khowr Rural District, Pish Khowr District, Famenin County, Hamadan Province, Iran. At the 2006 census, its population was 95, in 28 families.
