= Gur Gaz =

Gur Gaz گورگز
- Village
- Location within Iran
- Coordinates: 34°56′00″N 48°47′28″E
- Country: Iran
- Province: Hamadan
- County: Hamadan
- Bakhsh: Central
- Rural District: Sangestan

Population (2006)
  - Total: 211
- Time zone: UTC+3:30 (IRST)
  - Summer (DST): UTC+4:30 (IRDT)

Gur Gaz (Persian: گورگز, also Romanized as Gūr Gaz and Gūr Goz; also known as Gorgoz, Gūrgūz, and Kūrgōs) is a village in Sangestan Rural District, in the Central District of Hamadan County, Hamadan Province, Iran. At the 2006 census, its population was 211, in 47 families.
