= Qezeljeh-ye Khorqan =

Qezeljeh-ye Khorqan قزلجه خرقان
- Village
- Location within Iran
- Coordinates: 35°36′15″N 48°54′43″E
- Country: Iran
- Province: Hamadan
- County: Razan
- Bakhsh: Central
- Rural District: Kharqan

Population (2006)
  - Total: 323
- Time zone: UTC+3:30 (IRST)
  - Summer (DST): UTC+4:30 (IRDT)

Qezeljeh-ye Khorqan (Persian: قزلجه خرقان, also Romanized as Qezeljeh-ye Khorqān; also known as Qezeljeh) is a village in Kharqan Rural District, in the Central District of Razan County, Hamadan Province, Iran. At the 2006 census, its population was 323, in 73 families.
