= Rivasijan =

Rivasijan ريواسيجان
- Village
- Location within Iran
- Coordinates: 34°34′38″N 48°25′55″E
- Country: Iran
- Province: Hamadan
- County: Tuyserkan
- Bakhsh: Central
- Rural District: Hayaquq-e Nabi

Population (2006)
  - Total: 291
- Time zone: UTC+3:30 (IRST)
  - Summer (DST): UTC+4:30 (IRDT)

Rivasijan (Persian: ريواسيجان, also Romanized as Rīvāsījān and Rivasjan) is a village in Hayaquq-e Nabi Rural District, in the Central District of Tuyserkan County, Hamadan Province, Iran. At the 2006 census, its population was 291, in 82 families.
