= Dar Qeshlaq =

Dar Qeshlaq دارقشلاق
- Village
- Location within Iran
- Coordinates: 35°29′32″N 48°03′21″E
- Country: Iran
- Province: Hamadan
- County: Kabudarahang
- Bakhsh: Gol Tappeh
- Rural District: Mehraban-e Sofla

Population (2006)
  - Total: 266
- Time zone: UTC+3:30 (IRST)
  - Summer (DST): UTC+4:30 (IRDT)

Dar Qeshlaq (Persian: دارقشلاق, also Romanized as Dār Qeshlāq; also known as Dar Gheshlagh and Dār Kushlāq) is a village in Mehraban-e Sofla Rural District, Gol Tappeh District, Kabudarahang County, Hamadan Province, Iran. At the 2006 census, its population was 266, in 57 families.
