= Deh Choqai =

Deh Choqai ده چقايي
- Village
- Location within Iran
- Coordinates: 34°05′01″N 48°27′45″E
- Country: Iran
- Province: Hamadan
- County: Nahavand
- Bakhsh: Central
- Rural District: Gamasiyab

Population (2006)
  - Total: 541
- Time zone: UTC+3:30 (IRST)
  - Summer (DST): UTC+4:30 (IRDT)

Deh Choqai (Persian: ده چقايي, also Romanized as Deh Choqā’ī and Deh Cheqā’ī; also known as Choqā’ī, Deh Chagha’ī and Deh Cheqāsī) is a village in Gamasiyab Rural District, in the Central District of Nahavand County, Hamadan Province, Iran. At the 2006 census, its population was 541, in 142 families.
