= Shatzal =

Shatzal شطزل
- Village
- Location within Iran
- Coordinates: 34°18′11″N 47°58′26″E
- Country: Iran
- Province: Hamadan
- County: Nahavand
- Bakhsh: Khezel
- Rural District: Khezel-e Sharqi

Population (2006)
  - Total: 102
- Time zone: UTC+3:30 (IRST)
  - Summer (DST): UTC+4:30 (IRDT)

Shatzal (Persian: شطزل, also Romanized as Shaţz̧al and Shaţzal; also known as Shaşt Zāl, Shast Zall, and Shaţţ Z̄al Sha‘bān) is a village in Khezel-e Sharqi Rural District, Khezel District, Nahavand County, Hamadan Province, Iran. At the 2006 census, its population was 102, in 23 families.
