= Shir Barat =

Shir Barat شيربرات
- Village
- Location within Iran
- Coordinates: 35°38′00″N 48°22′57″E
- Country: Iran
- Province: Hamadan
- County: Kabudarahang
- Bakhsh: Shirin Su
- Rural District: Shirin Su

Population (2006)
  - Total: 221
- Time zone: UTC+3:30 (IRST)
  - Summer (DST): UTC+4:30 (IRDT)

Shir Barat (Persian: شيربرات, also Romanized as Shīr Barāt; also known as Shīrīn Barād) is a village in Shirin Su Rural District, Shirin Su District, Kabudarahang County, Hamadan Province, Iran. At the 2006 census, its population was 221, in 49 families.
