= Gol Heydar =

Gol Heydar گل حيدر
- Village
- Location within Iran
- Coordinates: 34°03′45″N 48°25′00″E
- Country: Iran
- Province: Hamadan
- County: Nahavand
- Bakhsh: Central
- Rural District: Gamasiyab

Population (2006)
  - Total: 680
- Time zone: UTC+3:30 (IRST)
  - Summer (DST): UTC+4:30 (IRDT)

Gol Heydar (Persian: گل حيدر, also Romanized as Gol Ḩeydar; also known as Gorgeh Dar and Gorg Ḩeydar) is a village in Gamasiyab Rural District, in the Central District of Nahavand County, Hamadan Province, Iran. At the 2006 census, its population was 680, in 170 families.
