= Zarrin Bagh =

Zarrin Bagh زرين باغ
- Village
- Location within Iran
- Coordinates: 34°17′41″N 48°03′07″E
- Country: Iran
- Province: Hamadan
- County: Nahavand
- Bakhsh: Khezel
- Rural District: Khezel-e Sharqi

Population (2006)
  - Total: 267
- Time zone: UTC+3:30 (IRST)
  - Summer (DST): UTC+4:30 (IRDT)

Zarrin Bagh (Persian: زرين باغ, also Romanized as Zarrīn Bāgh; also known as Zarrīnī) is a village in Khezel-e Sharqi Rural District, Khezel District, Nahavand County, Hamadan Province, Iran. At the 2006 census, its population was 267, in 59 families.
