= Tasbandi =

Tasbandi طاسبندي
- Village
- Location within Iran
- Coordinates: 34°33′41″N 48°47′26″E
- Country: Iran
- Province: Hamadan
- County: Malayer
- Bakhsh: Jowkar
- Rural District: Tork-e Gharbi

Population (2006)
  - Total: 554
- Time zone: UTC+3:30 (IRST)
  - Summer (DST): UTC+4:30 (IRDT)

Tasbandi (Persian: طاسبندي, also Romanized as Ţāsbandī) is a village in Tork-e Gharbi Rural District, Jowkar District, Malayer County, Hamadan Province, Iran. At the 2006 census, its population was 554, in 130 families.
