= Zapon =

Zapon زاپن
- Village
- Location within Iran
- Coordinates: 34°23′02″N 48°11′22″E
- Country: Iran
- Province: Hamadan
- County: Nahavand
- Bakhsh: Khezel
- Rural District: Khezel-e Sharqi

Population (2006)
  - Total: 220
- Time zone: UTC+3:30 (IRST)
  - Summer (DST): UTC+4:30 (IRDT)

Zapon (Persian: زاپن, also Romanized as Zāpon; also known as Zāpūn) is a village in Khezel-e Sharqi Rural District, Khezel District, Nahavand County, Hamadan Province, Iran. At the 2006 census, its population was 220, in 45 families.
