= Dali Chu =

Dali Chu داليچو
- Village
- Location within Iran
- Coordinates: 35°31′17″N 48°01′13″E
- Country: Iran
- Province: Hamadan
- County: Kabudarahang
- Bakhsh: Gol Tappeh
- Rural District: Mehraban-e Sofla

Population (2006)
  - Total: 470
- Time zone: UTC+3:30 (IRST)
  - Summer (DST): UTC+4:30 (IRDT)

Dali Chu (Persian: داليچو, also Romanized as Dālī Chū and Dalīchoo; also known as Dā’ī Chū and Dālūchū) is a village in Mehraban-e Sofla Rural District, Gol Tappeh District, Kabudarahang County, Hamadan province, Iran. At the 2006 census, its population was 470, in 100 families.
