= Darreh Rast =

Darreh Rast دره راست
- Village
- Location within Iran
- Coordinates: 34°01′44″N 48°59′55″E
- Country: Iran
- Province: Hamadan
- County: Malayer
- Bakhsh: Zand
- Rural District: Kamazan-e Sofla

Population (2006)
  - Total: 29
- Time zone: UTC+3:30 (IRST)
  - Summer (DST): UTC+4:30 (IRDT)

Darreh Rast (Persian: دره راست, also Romanized as Darreh Rāst) is a village in Kamazan-e Sofla Rural District, Zand District, Malayer County, Hamadan Province, Iran. At the 2006 census, its population was 29, in 10 families.
