= Daillar =

Daillar داييلر
- Village
- Location within Iran
- Coordinates: 34°31′13″N 48°50′00″E
- Country: Iran
- Province: Hamadan
- County: Malayer
- Bakhsh: Jowkar
- Rural District: Tork-e Gharbi

Population (2006)
  - Total: 41
- Time zone: UTC+3:30 (IRST)
  - Summer (DST): UTC+4:30 (IRDT)

Daillar (Persian: داييلر, also Romanized as Dā’īllar and Dā’īlar; also known as Lā’īdar and Lā’īlū) is a village in Tork-e Gharbi Rural District, Jowkar District, Malayer County, Hamadan province, Iran. At the 2006 census, its population was 41, in 13 families.
