= Kangavar-e Kohneh =

Kangavar-e Kohneh كنگاوركهنه
- Village
- Location within Iran
- Coordinates: 34°20′31″N 47°58′34″E
- Country: Iran
- Province: Hamadan
- County: Nahavand
- Bakhsh: Khezel
- Rural District: Khezel-e Sharqi

Population (2006)
  - Total: 335
- Time zone: UTC+3:30 (IRST)
  - Summer (DST): UTC+4:30 (IRDT)

Kangavar-e Kohneh (Persian: كنگاوركهنه, also Romanized as Kangāvar-e Kohneh and Kangāvar Kohneh; also known as Kangarvar-i-Kuhna) is a village in Khezel-e Sharqi Rural District, Khezel District, Nahavand County, Hamadan Province, Iran. At the 2006 census, its population was 335, in 85 families.
