= Tas Tappeh =

Tas Tappeh طاس تپه
- Village
- Location within Iran
- Coordinates: 35°09′50″N 48°29′00″E
- Country: Iran
- Province: Hamadan
- County: Kabudarahang
- Bakhsh: Central
- Rural District: Sardaran

Population (2006)
  - Total: 318
- Time zone: UTC+3:30 (IRST)
  - Summer (DST): UTC+4:30 (IRDT)

Tas Tappeh (Persian: طاس تپه, also Romanized as Ţās Tappeh; also known as Tash Tepe) is a village in Sardaran Rural District, in the Central District of Kabudarahang County, Hamadan Province, Iran. At the 2006 census, its population was 318, in 67 families.
