= Deh Dalian =

Deh Dalian ده دليان
- Village
- Location within Iran
- Coordinates: 34°48′17″N 48°42′41″E
- Country: Iran
- Province: Hamadan
- County: Hamadan
- Bakhsh: Central
- Rural District: Sangestan

Population (2006)
  - Total: 339
- Time zone: UTC+3:30 (IRST)
  - Summer (DST): UTC+4:30 (IRDT)

Deh Dalian (Persian: ده دليان, also Romanized as Deh Dalīān, Deh Delīān, and Deh Delyān) is a village in Sangestan Rural District, in the Central District of Hamadan County, Hamadan Province, Iran. At the 2006 census, its population was 339, in 87 families.
