= Vali Mohammad =

Vali Mohammad ولي محمد
- Village
- Location within Iran
- Coordinates: 35°09′07″N 48°22′50″E
- Country: Iran
- Province: Hamadan
- County: Kabudarahang
- Bakhsh: Central
- Rural District: Kuhin

Population (2006)
  - Total: 563
- Time zone: UTC+3:30 (IRST)
  - Summer (DST): UTC+4:30 (IRDT)

Vali Mohammad (Persian: ولي محمد, also Romanized as Valī Moḩammad; also known as Dalī Moḩammad and Dil-i-Muhammad) is a village in Kuhin Rural District, in the Central District of Kabudarahang County, Hamadan Province, Iran. At the 2006 census, its population was 563, in 111 families.
