= Mohara =

Mohara محرا
- Village
- Location within Iran
- Coordinates: 34°33′19″N 48°52′07″E
- Country: Iran
- Province: Hamadan
- County: Malayer
- Bakhsh: Jowkar
- Rural District: Tork-e Gharbi

Population (2006)
  - Total: 120
- Time zone: UTC+3:30 (IRST)
  - Summer (DST): UTC+4:30 (IRDT)

Mohara (Persian: محرا, also Romanized as Moḩarā and Moḩarrā; also known as Mohreh) is a village in Tork-e Gharbi Rural District, Jowkar District, Malayer County, Hamadan Province, Iran. At the 2006 census, its population was 120, in 33 families.
