= Qeshlaq-e Najaf =

Qeshlaq-e Najaf قشلاق نجف
- Village
- Location within Iran
- Coordinates: 34°22′20″N 48°14′42″E
- Country: Iran
- Province: Hamadan
- County: Nahavand
- Bakhsh: Khezel
- Rural District: Khezel-e Sharqi

Population (2006)
  - Total: 228
- Time zone: UTC+3:30 (IRST)
  - Summer (DST): UTC+4:30 (IRDT)

Qeshlaq-e Najaf (Persian: قشلاق نجف, also Romanized as Qeshlāq-e Najaf and Qeshlaq Najaf; also known as Qeshlāq-e Najafbeh) is a village in Khezel-e Sharqi Rural District, Khezel District, Nahavand County, Hamadan Province, Iran. At the 2006 census, its population was 228, in 43 families.
