= Anjir Baghi =

Anjir Baghi انجيرباغي
- Village
- Location within Iran
- Coordinates: 35°11′33″N 48°31′54″E
- Country: Iran
- Province: Hamadan
- County: Kabudarahang
- Bakhsh: Central
- Rural District: Sardaran

Population (2006)
  - Total: 224
- Time zone: UTC+3:30 (IRST)
  - Summer (DST): UTC+4:30 (IRDT)

Anjir Baghi (Persian: انجيرباغي, also Romanized as Anjīr Bāghī; also known as Enjīl Bāghī and Injil Bāqi) is a village in Sardaran Rural District, in the Central District of Kabudarahang County, Hamadan Province, Iran. At the 2006 census, its population was 224, in 52 families.
