= Khvajeh Hesar =

Khvajeh Hesar خواجه حصار
- Village
- Location within Iran
- Coordinates: 35°00′00″N 49°20′21″E
- Country: Iran
- Province: Hamadan
- County: Famenin
- Bakhsh: Pish Khowr
- Rural District: Pish Khowr

Population (2006)
  - Total: 50
- Time zone: UTC+3:30 (IRST)
  - Summer (DST): UTC+4:30 (IRDT)

Khvajeh Hesar (Persian: خواجه حصار, also Romanized as Khvājeh Ḩeşār; also known as Khājeh Ḩeşārī, Khvājeh Ḩeşārī, Khwajehsar, and Kīveh Jīlar) is a village in Pish Khowr Rural District, Pish Khowr District, Famenin County, Hamadan Province, Iran. At the 2006 census, its population was 50, in 11 families.
