= Nehenjeh =

Nahanjeh نهنجه
- Village
- Location within Iran
- Coordinates: 34°32′28″N 48°43′02″E
- Country: Iran
- Province: Hamadan
- County: Malayer
- Bakhsh: Jowkar
- Rural District: Tork-e Gharbi

Population (2006)
  - Total: 202
- Time zone: UTC+3:30 (IRST)
  - Summer (DST): UTC+4:30 (IRDT)

Nehenjeh (Persian: نهنجه, also Romanized as Nahanjeh; also known as Nanjeh and Nenjeh) is a village in Tork-e Gharbi Rural District, Jowkar District, Malayer County, Hamadan Province, Iran. At the 2006 census, its population was 202, in 56 families.
