= Darsibeh =

Darsibeh دارسيبه
- Village
- Location within Iran
- Coordinates: 34°16′11″N 48°00′25″E
- Country: Iran
- Province: Hamadan
- County: Nahavand
- Bakhsh: Khezel
- Rural District: Khezel-e Sharqi

Population (2006)
  - Total: 269
- Time zone: UTC+3:30 (IRST)
  - Summer (DST): UTC+4:30 (IRDT)

Darsibeh (Persian: دارسيبه, also Romanized as Dārsībeh; also known as Dārsīb) is a village in Khezel-e Sharqi Rural District, Khezel District, Nahavand County, Hamadan Province, Iran. At the 2006 census, its population was 269, in 65 families.
