= Qazi Mardan =

Qazi Mardan قاضي مردان
- Village
- Location within Iran
- Coordinates: 34°46′37″N 48°00′51″E
- Country: Iran
- Province: Hamadan
- County: Asadabad
- Bakhsh: Central
- Rural District: Darbandrud

Population (2006)
  - Total: 232
- Time zone: UTC+3:30 (IRST)
  - Summer (DST): UTC+4:30 (IRDT)

Qazi Mardan (Persian: قاضي مردان, also Romanized as Qāẕī Mardān and Qāzī Mardān; also known as Meymardān) is a village in Darbandrud Rural District, in the Central District of Asadabad County, Hamadan Province, Iran. At the 2006 census, its population was 232, in 45 families.
