= Chal Boqa =

Chal Boqa چال بقا
- Village
- Location within Iran
- Coordinates: 35°25′14″N 48°55′39″E
- Country: Iran
- Province: Hamadan
- County: Razan
- Bakhsh: Sardrud
- Rural District: Sardrud-e Sofla

Population (2006)
  - Total: 278
- Time zone: UTC+3:30 (IRST)
  - Summer (DST): UTC+4:30 (IRDT)

Chal Boqa (Persian: چال بقا, also Romanized as Chāl Boqā; also known as Chābūgha, Chāl Boghā’, Chālbūgha, and Shālbaqā) is a village in Sardrud-e Sofla Rural District, Sardrud District, Razan County, Hamadan Province, Iran. At the 2006 census, its population was 278, in 57 families.
