= Pir Khodaverdi =

Pir Khodaverdi (Pir Shahverdi) پیرشاهوردی
- Village
- Location within Iran
- Coordinates: 34°19′30″N 48°55′43″E
- Country: Iran
- Province: Hamadan
- County: Malayer
- Bakhsh: Central
- Rural District: Kuh Sardeh

Population (2006)
  - Total: 119
- Time zone: UTC+3:30 (IRST)
  - Summer (DST): UTC+4:30 (IRDT)

Pir Shahverdi (After 78's Islamic revolution: Pir Khodaverdi) (Persian: پیرشاهوردی also Persian: پيرخداوردي, also Romanized as Pīr-e Shāhverdī, Pileh Shāhvardī, Pīr Shāhverdī and Pīr Khodāverdī) is a village in Kuh Sardeh Rural District, in the Central District of Malayer County, Hamadan Province, Iran. At the 2006 census, its population was 119, in 29 families.
