= Panbeh Dar =

Panbeh Dar پنبه در
- Village
- Location within Iran
- Coordinates: 34°03′55″N 48°26′44″E
- Country: Iran
- Province: Hamadan
- County: Nahavand
- Bakhsh: Central
- Rural District: Gamasiyab

Population (2006)
  - Total: 151
- Time zone: UTC+3:30 (IRST)
  - Summer (DST): UTC+4:30 (IRDT)

Panbeh Dar (Persian: پنبه در; also known as Panbeh Deh) is a village in Gamasiyab Rural District, in the Central District of Nahavand County, Hamadan Province, Iran. At the 2006 census, its population was 151, in 33 families.
