= Ghazyatan =

Ghazyatan غازياتان
- Village
- Location within Iran
- Coordinates: 35°19′56″N 48°55′54″E
- Country: Iran
- Province: Hamadan
- County: Razan
- Bakhsh: Central
- Rural District: Razan

Population (2006)
  - Total: 160
- Time zone: UTC+3:30 (IRST)
  - Summer (DST): UTC+4:30 (IRDT)

Ghazyatan (Persian: غازياتان, also Romanized as Ghāzyātān; also known as Ghār Yātān, Qāzītūn, Qazīyātān, and Qāzyātān) is a village in Razan Rural District, in the Central District of Razan County, Hamadan Province, Iran. At the 2006 census, its population was 160, in 48 families.
