= Hasan Teymur =

Hasan Teymur حسن تيمور
- Village
- Location within Iran
- Coordinates: 35°22′33″N 48°21′49″E
- Country: Iran
- Province: Hamadan
- County: Kabudarahang
- Bakhsh: Gol Tappeh
- Rural District: Ali Sadr

Population (2006)
  - Total: 154
- Time zone: UTC+3:30 (IRST)
  - Summer (DST): UTC+4:30 (IRDT)

Hasan Teymur (Persian: حسن تيمور, also Romanized as Ḩasan Teymūr and Hasan Teimoor; also known as Hasan Temur) is a village in Ali Sadr Rural District, Gol Tappeh District, Kabudarahang County, Hamadan Province, Iran. At the 2006 census, its population was 154, in 39 families.
