= Kamar Boneh =

Kamar Boneh كمربنه
- Village
- Location within Iran
- Coordinates: 34°10′30″N 48°38′06″E
- Country: Iran
- Province: Hamadan
- County: Malayer
- Bakhsh: Samen
- Rural District: Samen

Population (2006)
  - Total: 84
- Time zone: UTC+3:30 (IRST)
  - Summer (DST): UTC+4:30 (IRDT)

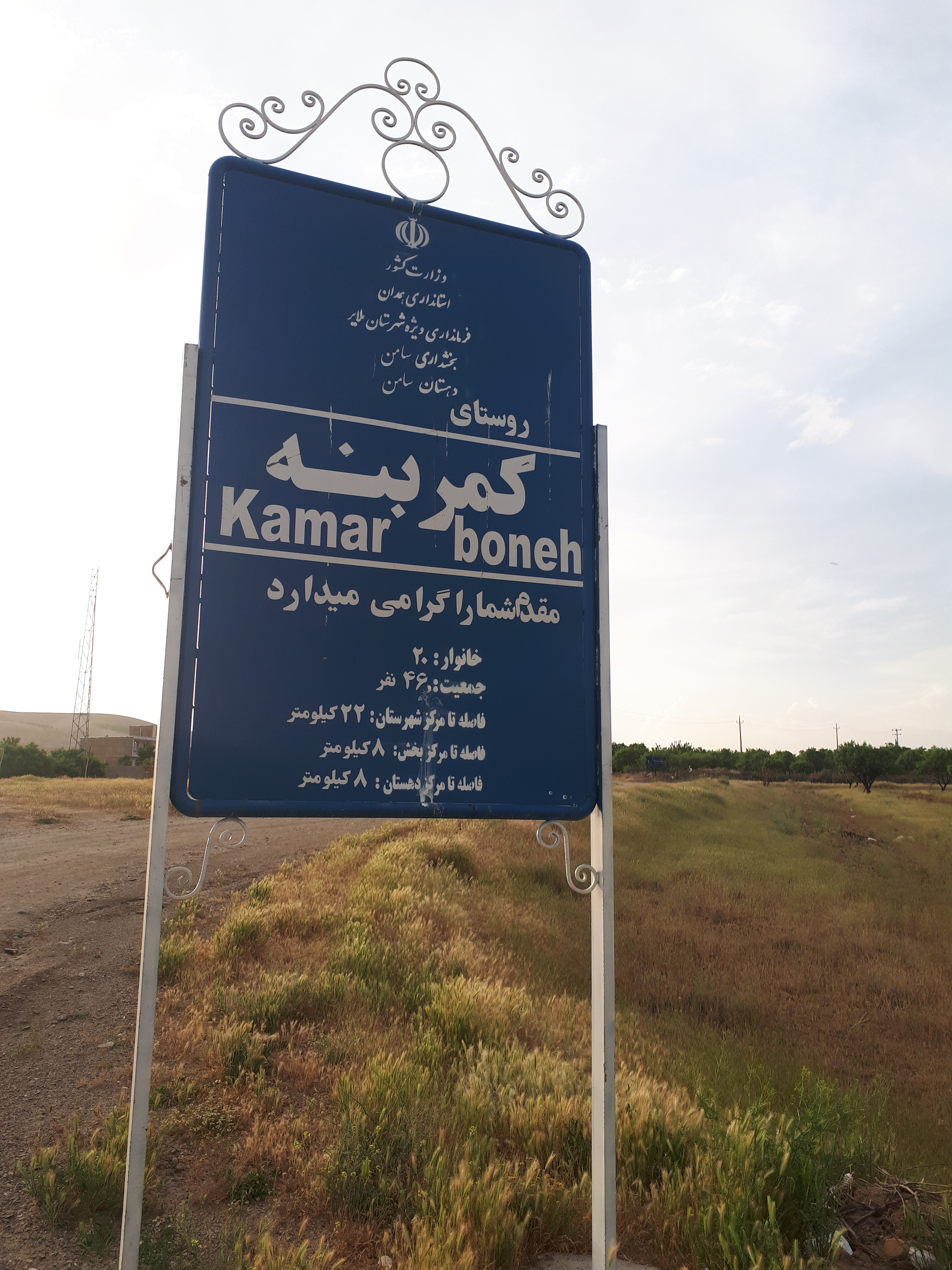
A sign for Kamar Boneh village in Samen District, Malayer County, Hamadan Province in Iran.

Kamar Boneh (Persian: كمربنه; also known as Kamarbūneh) is a village in Samen Rural District, Samen District, Malayer County, Hamadan Province, Iran. At the 2006 census, its population was 84, in 27 families.
