= Virai =

Virai ويرايي
- Village
- Location within Iran
- Coordinates: 34°43′20″N 48°13′37″E
- Country: Iran
- Province: Hamadan
- County: Asadabad
- Bakhsh: Central
- Rural District: Seyyed Jamal ol Din

Population (2006)
  - Total: 614
- Time zone: UTC+3:30 (IRST)
  - Summer (DST): UTC+4:30 (IRDT)

Virai (Persian: ويرايي, also Romanized as Vīrā’ī; also known as Shīrāzel, Shīrazīl, Shīreh Zelī, Shīrzellī, and Vīrānī) is a village in Seyyed Jamal ol Din Rural District, in the Central District of Asadabad County, Hamadan Province, Iran. At the 2006 census, its population was 614, in 152 families.
