= Kuy Bolagh =

Kuy Bolagh كوي بلاغ
- Village
- Country: Iran
- Province: Hamadan
- County: Famenin
- Bakhsh: Pish Khowr
- Rural District: Pish Khowr

Population (2006)
  - Total: 24
- Time zone: UTC+3:30 (IRST)
  - Summer (DST): UTC+4:30 (IRDT)

Kuy Bolagh (Persian: كوي بلاغ, also Romanized as Kūy Bolāgh) is a village in Pish Khowr Rural District, Pish Khowr District, Famenin County, Hamadan Province, Iran. At the 2006 census, its population was 24, in 9 families.
