= Alijuq =

Alijuq عه‌ليجوق(کوردستان کوچک)
- Village
- Location within Iran
- Coordinates: 34°36′31″N 48°51′07″E
- Country: Iran
- Province: Hamadan
- County: Malayer
- Bakhsh: Jowkar
- Rural District: Tork-e Gharbi

Population (2006)
  - Total: 171
- Time zone: UTC+3:30 (IRST)
  - Summer (DST): UTC+4:30 (IRDT)

Alijuq (Persian: عليجوق, also Romanized as ‘Alījūq) is a village in Tork-e Gharbi Rural District, Jowkar District, Malayer County, Hamadan Province, Iran. At the 2006 census, its population was 171, in 44 families. The common language of this village is Kurdish and people speak Kurdish in their daily work.
