= Vasleh =

Vasleh وصله
- Village
- Location within Iran
- Coordinates: 35°12′46″N 48°20′47″E
- Country: Iran
- Province: Hamadan
- County: Kabudarahang
- Bakhsh: Central
- Rural District: Kuhin

Population (2006)
  - Total: 340
- Time zone: UTC+3:30 (IRST)
  - Summer (DST): UTC+4:30 (IRDT)

Vasleh (Persian: وصله, also Romanized as Vaşleh, Vaslah, and Wasleh) is a village in Kuhin Rural District, in the Central District of Kabudarahang County, Hamadan Province, Iran. At the 2006 census, its population was 340, made up of 59 families.
