= Siah Goleh =

Siah Goleh سياه گله
- Village
- Location within Iran
- Coordinates: 34°56′45″N 47°58′06″E
- Country: Iran
- Province: Hamadan
- County: Asadabad
- Bakhsh: Central
- Rural District: Chaharduli

Population (2006)
  - Total: 284
- Time zone: UTC+3:30 (IRST)
  - Summer (DST): UTC+4:30 (IRDT)

Siah Goleh (Persian: سياه گله, also Romanized as Sīāh Goleh, Seyāh Geleh, and Sīāh Geleh; also known as Sīāhgileh and Siyahgella) is a village in Chaharduli Rural District, in the Central District of Asadabad County, Hamadan Province, Iran. At the 2006 census, its population was 284, in 61 families.
