= Mobarakin =

Mobarakin مباركين
- Village
- Location within Iran
- Coordinates: 35°05′53″N 49°25′27″E
- Country: Iran
- Province: Hamadan
- County: Famenin
- Bakhsh: Pish Khowr
- Rural District: Pish Khowr

Population (2006)
  - Total: 149
- Time zone: UTC+3:30 (IRST)
  - Summer (DST): UTC+4:30 (IRDT)

Mobarakin (Persian: مباركين, also Romanized as Mobārakīn) is a village in Pish Khowr Rural District, Pish Khowr District, Famenin County, Hamadan Province, Iran. At the 2006 census, its population was 149, in 42 families.
