= Reza Baghi =

Reza Baghi رضاباغي
- Village
- Location within Iran
- Coordinates: 35°10′58″N 49°18′52″E
- Country: Iran
- Province: Hamadan
- County: Famenin
- Bakhsh: Pish Khowr
- Rural District: Pish Khowr

Population (2006)
  - Total: 82
- Time zone: UTC+3:30 (IRST)
  - Summer (DST): UTC+4:30 (IRDT)

Reza Baghi (Persian: رضاباغي, also Romanized as Reẕā Bāghī; also known as Reẕā Bāgh and Riza Bāgh) is a village in Pish Khowr Rural District, Pish Khowr District, Famenin County, Hamadan Province, Iran. At the 2006 census, its population was 82, in 25 families.
