= Ashaq Qaleh =

Village in Hamadan, Iran

Ashaq Qaleh اشاق قلعه
- Village
- Location within Iran
- Coordinates: 34°34′15″N 48°48′47″E
- Country: Iran
- Province: Hamadan
- County: Malayer
- Bakhsh: Jowkar
- Rural District: Tork-e Gharbi

Population (2006)
  - Total: 248
- Time zone: UTC+3:30 (IRST)
  - Summer (DST): UTC+4:30 (IRDT)

Ashaq Qaleh (Persian: اشاق قلعه, also Romanized as Āshāq Qal‘eh, Ashāq Qal‘eh, Ashshāq Qal‘eh, and Esḩāq Qal‘eh; also known as Āshāqī Qal‘eh, Es-hagh Ghal”eh, Eshāqī Qal‘eh, and Is-hāq Qal‘eh) is a village in Tork-e Gharbi Rural District, Jowkar District, Malayer County, Hamadan Province, Iran. At the 2006 census, its population was 248, in 53 families.
