= Niyanj =

Niyanj نينج
- Village
- Location within Iran
- Coordinates: 35°20′55″N 48°55′02″E
- Country: Iran
- Province: Hamadan
- County: Razan
- Bakhsh: Central
- Rural District: Razan

Population (2006)
  - Total: 464
- Time zone: UTC+3:30 (IRST)
  - Summer (DST): UTC+4:30 (IRDT)

Niyanj (Persian: نينج, also Romanized as Nīyanj and Neyanj) is a village in Razan Rural District, in the Central District of Razan County, Hamadan Province, Iran. At the 2006 census, its population was 464, in 104 families.
