= Qaleh-ye Zorati =

Qaleh-ye Zorati قلعه ذراتي
- Village
- Location within Iran
- Coordinates: 34°06′44″N 48°22′56″E
- Country: Iran
- Province: Hamadan
- County: Nahavand
- Bakhsh: Central
- Rural District: Shaban

Population (2006)
  - Total: 104
- Time zone: UTC+3:30 (IRST)
  - Summer (DST): UTC+4:30 (IRDT)

Qaleh-ye Zorati (Persian: قلعه ذراتي, also Romanized as Qal‘eh-ye Z̄orātī, Qal‘eh-ye Z̄oratī, and Qal‘eh-ye Z̄orratī; also known as Kāla Zarat, Kāla Zarati, and Qal‘eh-ye Zarāt) is a village in Shaban Rural District, in the Central District of Nahavand County, Hamadan Province, Iran. At the 2006 census, its population was 104, in 28 families.
