= Qoli Laleh-ye Sofla =

Qoli Laleh-ye Sofla قلي لاله سفلي
- Village
- Location within Iran
- Coordinates: 34°31′41″N 48°15′35″E
- Country: Iran
- Province: Hamadan
- County: Tuyserkan
- Bakhsh: Qolqol Rud
- Rural District: Qolqol Rud

Population (2006)
  - Total: 403
- Time zone: UTC+3:30 (IRST)
  - Summer (DST): UTC+4:30 (IRDT)

Qoli Laleh-ye Sofla (Persian: قلي لاله سفلي, also Romanized as Qolī Lāleh-ye Sofla; also known as Gol Lāleh, Qolī Lāleh, Qolī Lāleh-ye Pā’īn, and Quli Lāleh) is a village in Qolqol Rud Rural District, Qolqol Rud District, Tuyserkan County, Hamadan Province, Iran. At the 2006 census, its population was 403, in 94 families.
