= Shilandar-e Sofla =

Shilandar-e Sofla شيلاندرسفلي
- Village
- Location within Iran
- Coordinates: 34°40′03″N 48°10′07″E
- Country: Iran
- Province: Hamadan
- County: Asadabad
- Bakhsh: Central
- Rural District: Seyyed Jamal ol Din

Population (2006)
  - Total: 79
- Time zone: UTC+3:30 (IRST)
  - Summer (DST): UTC+4:30 (IRDT)

Shilandar-e Sofla (Persian: شيلاندرسفلي, also Romanized as Shīlāndar-e Soflá; also known as Shīlāndar) is a village in Seyyed Jamal ol Din Rural District, in the Central District of Asadabad County, Hamadan Province, Iran. At the 2006 census, its population was 79, in 15 families.
