= Qaleh-ye Kartilabad =

Qaleh-ye Kartilabad قلعه كرتيل اباد
- Village
- Location within Iran
- Coordinates: 34°20′28″N 48°39′07″E
- Country: Iran
- Province: Hamadan
- County: Malayer
- Bakhsh: Samen
- Rural District: Haram Rud-e Sofla

Population (2006)
  - Total: 129
- Time zone: UTC+3:30 (IRST)
  - Summer (DST): UTC+4:30 (IRDT)

Qaleh-ye Kartilabad (Persian: قلعه كرتيل اباد, also Romanized as Qal‘eh-ye Kartīlābād; also known as Ghal”eh Kartil Abad) is a village in Haram Rud-e Sofla Rural District, Samen District, Malayer County, Hamadan Province, Iran. In the 2006 census, its population was 129, in 39 families.
