= Mokarrabi =

Mokarrabi مكربي
- Village
- Location within Iran
- Coordinates: 34°37′30″N 48°41′52″E
- Country: Iran
- Province: Hamadan
- County: Malayer
- Bakhsh: Jowkar
- Rural District: Tork-e Gharbi

Population (2006)
  - Total: 73
- Time zone: UTC+3:30 (IRST)
  - Summer (DST): UTC+4:30 (IRDT)

Mokarrabi (Persian: مكربي, also Romanized as Mokarrabī and Mokarrebī; also known as Makrebi Asdollah Khan) is a village in Tork-e Gharbi Rural District, Jowkar District, Malayer County, Hamadan Province, Iran. At the 2006 census, its population was 73, in 12 families.
