= Abdalan =

Abdalan ابدالان
- Village
- Location within Iran
- Coordinates: 34°39′10″N 48°14′44″E
- Country: Iran
- Province: Hamadan
- County: Tuyserkan
- Bakhsh: Central
- Rural District: Khorram Rud

Population (2006)
  - Total: 431
- Time zone: UTC+3:30 (IRST)
  - Summer (DST): UTC+4:30 (IRDT)

Abdalan (Persian: ابدالان, also Romanized as Abdālān; also known as ‘Abdehlān) is a village in Khorram Rud Rural District, in the Central District of Tuyserkan County, Hamadan Province, Iran. At the 2006 census, its population was 431, in 111 families.
