= Gujak =

Gujak گوجك
- Village
- Location within Iran
- Coordinates: 34°32′27″N 48°50′25″E
- Country: Iran
- Province: Hamadan
- County: Malayer
- Bakhsh: Jowkar
- Rural District: Tork-e Gharbi

Population (2006)
  - Total: 80
- Time zone: UTC+3:30 (IRST)
  - Summer (DST): UTC+4:30 (IRDT)

Gujak (Persian: گوجك, also Romanized as Gūjak, Goojek, and Gowjak) is a village in Tork-e Gharbi Rural District, Jowkar District, Malayer County, Hamadan Province, Iran. At the 2006 census, its population was 80, in 18 families.
