= Khvajeh Kandi =

Khvajeh Kandi خواجه كندي
- Village
- Location within Iran
- Coordinates: 35°21′43″N 48°23′06″E
- Country: Iran
- Province: Hamadan
- County: Kabudarahang
- Bakhsh: Gol Tappeh
- Rural District: Ali Sadr

Population (2006)
  - Total: 252
- Time zone: UTC+3:30 (IRST)
  - Summer (DST): UTC+4:30 (IRDT)

Khvajeh Kandi (Persian: خواجه كندي, also Romanized as Khvājeh Kandī) is a village in Ali Sadr Rural District, Gol Tappeh District, Kabudarahang County, Hamadan Province, Iran. At the 2006 census, its population was 252, in 55 families.
