= Gulvand =

Gulvand گولوند
- Village
- Location within Iran
- Coordinates: 34°22′51″N 48°58′31″E
- Country: Iran
- Province: Hamadan
- County: Malayer
- Bakhsh: Central
- Rural District: Kuh Sardeh

Population (2006)
  - Total: 112
- Time zone: UTC+3:30 (IRST)
  - Summer (DST): UTC+4:30 (IRDT)

Gulvand (Persian: گولوند, also Romanized as Gūlvand and Goolvand; also known as Golband, Golvandeh, Gulband, and Gūlbeh) is a village in Kuh Sardeh Rural District, in the Central District of Malayer County, Hamadan Province, Iran. At the 2006 census, its population was 112, in 22 families.
