= Tahunabad =

Tahunabad طاحون اباد
- Village
- Location within Iran
- Coordinates: 34°50′19″N 48°51′59″E
- Country: Iran
- Province: Hamadan
- County: Hamadan
- Bakhsh: Shara
- Rural District: Jeyhun Dasht

Population (2006)
  - Total: 69
- Time zone: UTC+3:30 (IRST)
  - Summer (DST): UTC+4:30 (IRDT)

Tahunabad (Persian: طاحون اباد, also Romanized as Tāhūnābād, Ţāḩūnābād, and Tāḩūnābād) is a village in Jeyhun Dasht Rural District, Shara District, Hamadan County, Hamadan Province, Iran. At the 2006 census, its population was 69, in 23 families.
