= Nesar =

Nesar نثار
- Village
- Location within Iran
- Coordinates: 34°04′37″N 48°28′07″E
- Country: Iran
- Province: Hamadan
- County: Nahavand
- Bakhsh: Central
- Rural District: Gamasiyab

Population (2006)
  - Total: 574
- Time zone: UTC+3:30 (IRST)
  - Summer (DST): UTC+4:30 (IRDT)

Nesar (Persian: نثار, also Romanized as Nes̄ār and Nesār) is a village in Gamasiyab Rural District, in the Central District of Nahavand County, Hamadan Province, Iran. At the 2006 census, its population was 574, in 158 families.
