= Gurjiu =

Gurjiu گورجيو
- Village
- Location within Iran
- Coordinates: 34°11′09″N 48°24′20″E
- Country: Iran
- Province: Hamadan
- County: Nahavand
- Bakhsh: Central
- Rural District: Shaban

Population (2006)
  - Total: 51
- Time zone: UTC+3:30 (IRST)
  - Summer (DST): UTC+4:30 (IRDT)

Gurjiu (Persian: گورجيو, also Romanized as Gūrjīū; also known as Kabūtar Haleh and Kaftar Ḩalah) is a village in Shaban Rural District, in the Central District of Nahavand County, Hamadan Province, Iran. At the 2006 census, its population was 51, in 13 families.
