= Deh Nush =

Deh Nush دهنوش
- Village
- Location within Iran
- Coordinates: 34°45′40″N 48°00′11″E
- Country: Iran
- Province: Hamadan
- County: Asadabad
- Bakhsh: Central
- Rural District: Darbandrud

Population (2006)
  - Total: 279
- Time zone: UTC+3:30 (IRST)
  - Summer (DST): UTC+4:30 (IRDT)

Deh Nush (Persian: دهنوش, also Romanized as Deh Nūsh) is a village in Darbandrud Rural District, in the Central District of Asadabad County, Hamadan Province, Iran. At the 2006 census, its population was 279, in 64 families.
