= Golshir =

Golshir گل شير
- Village
- Location within Iran
- Coordinates: 34°24′00″N 48°41′00″E
- Country: Iran
- Province: Hamadan
- County: Malayer
- Bakhsh: Jowkar
- Rural District: Jowkar

Population (2006)
  - Total: 137
- Time zone: UTC+3:30 (IRST)
  - Summer (DST): UTC+4:30 (IRDT)

Golshir (Persian: گل شير, also Romanized as Golshīr; also known as Afsarīyeh) is a village in Jowkar Rural District, Jowkar District, Malayer County, Hamadan Province, Iran. At the 2006 census, its population was 137, in 41 families.
