= Oshtorjin =

Oshtorjin اشترجين
- Village
- Location within Iran
- Coordinates: 34°46′33″N 48°10′20″E
- Country: Iran
- Province: Hamadan
- County: Asadabad
- Bakhsh: Central
- Rural District: Seyyed Jamal ol Din

Population (2006)
  - Total: 531
- Time zone: UTC+3:30 (IRST)
  - Summer (DST): UTC+4:30 (IRDT)

Oshtorjin (Persian: اشترجين, also Romanized as Oshtorjīn; also known as Ostorjīn) is a village in Seyyed Jamal ol Din Rural District, in the Central District of Asadabad County, Hamadan Province, Iran. At the 2006 census, its population was 531, in 110 families.
