= Pir Badam =

Pir Badam پيربادام
- Village
- Location within Iran
- Coordinates: 35°34′02″N 48°08′20″E
- Country: Iran
- Province: Hamadan
- County: Kabudarahang
- Bakhsh: Gol Tappeh
- Rural District: Mehraban-e Sofla

Population (2006)
  - Total: 467
- Time zone: UTC+3:30 (IRST)
  - Summer (DST): UTC+4:30 (IRDT)

Pir Badam (Persian: پيربادام, also Romanized as Pīr Bādām) is a village in Mehraban-e Sofla Rural District, Gol Tappeh District, Kabudarahang County, Hamadan Province, Iran. At the 2006 census, its population was 467, in 107 families.
