= Sulijeh =

Sulijeh سوليجه
- Village
- Location within Iran
- Coordinates: 35°16′07″N 48°20′04″E
- Country: Iran
- Province: Hamadan
- County: Kabudarahang
- Bakhsh: Gol Tappeh
- Rural District: Ali Sadr

Population (2006)
  - Total: 238
- Time zone: UTC+3:30 (IRST)
  - Summer (DST): UTC+4:30 (IRDT)

Sulijeh (Persian: سوليجه, also Romanized as Sūlījeh and Sowlījeh; also known as Soolcheh and Sulujeh) is a village in Ali Sadr Rural District, Gol Tappeh District, Kabudarahang County, Hamadan Province, Iran. At the 2006 census, its population was 238, in 53 families.
