= Biaj =

Biaj بياج
- Village
- Location within Iran
- Coordinates: 34°48′54″N 48°05′57″E
- Country: Iran
- Province: Hamadan
- County: Asadabad
- Bakhsh: Central
- Rural District: Seyyed Jamal ol Din

Population (2006)
  - Total: 118
- Time zone: UTC+3:30 (IRST)
  - Summer (DST): UTC+4:30 (IRDT)

Biaj (Persian: بياج, also Romanized as Bīāj, Bayāj, and Beyāj; also known as Beyāch) is a village in Seyyed Jamal ol Din Rural District, in the Central District of Asadabad County, Hamadan Province, Iran. At the 2006 census, its population was 118, in 26 families.
