= Arteh Bolagh =

Arteh Bolagh ارته بلاغ
- Village
- Location within Iran
- Coordinates: 34°19′35″N 48°32′57″E
- Country: Iran
- Province: Hamadan
- County: Malayer
- Bakhsh: Samen
- Rural District: Haram Rud-e Sofla

Population (2006)
  - Total: 22
- Time zone: UTC+3:30 (IRST)
  - Summer (DST): UTC+4:30 (IRDT)

Arteh Bolagh (Persian: ارته بلاغ, also Romanized as Ārteh Bolāgh and Ārtah Bolāgh; also known as Ūrteh Bolāgh) is a village in Haram Rud-e Sofla Rural District, Samen District, Malayer County, Hamadan Province, Iran. At the 2006 census, its population was 22, in 5 families.
