= Segavi =

Segavi سگاوي
- Village
- Location within Iran
- Coordinates: 34°35′07″N 48°06′03″E
- Country: Iran
- Province: Hamadan
- County: Tuyserkan
- Bakhsh: Qolqol Rud
- Rural District: Miyan Rud

Population (2006)
  - Total: 261
- Time zone: UTC+3:30 (IRST)
  - Summer (DST): UTC+4:30 (IRDT)

Segavi (Persian: سگاوي, also Romanized as Segāvī and Sagavī; also known as Sakāvī and Sekāvī) is a village in Miyan Rud Rural District, Qolqol Rud District, Tuyserkan County, Hamadan Province, Iran. At the 2006 census, its population was 261, in 72 families.
