= Qeshlaq-e Deh Ful =

Qeshlaq-e Deh Ful قشلاق دهفول
- Village
- Location within Iran
- Coordinates: 34°14′38″N 48°20′15″E
- Country: Iran
- Province: Hamadan
- County: Nahavand
- Bakhsh: Central
- Rural District: Tariq ol Eslam

Population (2006)
  - Total: 117
- Time zone: UTC+3:30 (IRST)
  - Summer (DST): UTC+4:30 (IRDT)

Qeshlaq-e Deh Ful (Persian: قشلاق دهفول, also Romanized as Qeshlāq-e Deh Fūl; also known as Gheslagh Dehfool, Qeshlāq-e Dehmūl, and Qeshlāq-e Dehpūl) is a village in Tariq ol Eslam Rural District, in the Central District of Nahavand County, Hamadan Province, Iran. At the 2006 census, its population was 117, in 24 families.
