= Zereshgi =

Zereshgi زرشگي
- Village
- Location within Iran
- Coordinates: 34°10′00″N 48°42′59″E
- Country: Iran
- Province: Hamadan
- County: Malayer
- Bakhsh: Samen
- Rural District: Samen

Population (2006)
  - Total: 88
- Time zone: UTC+3:30 (IRST)
  - Summer (DST): UTC+4:30 (IRDT)

Zereshgi (Persian: زرشگي, also Romanized as Zereshgī; also known as Zereshkī) is a village in Samen Rural District, Samen District, Malayer County, Hamadan Province, Iran. At the 2006 census, its population was 88, in 32 families.
