= Qeshlaq-e Shirazi =

Qeshlaq-e Shirazi قشلاق شيرازي
- Village
- Location within Iran
- Coordinates: 34°23′02″N 48°56′21″E
- Country: Iran
- Province: Hamadan
- County: Malayer
- Bakhsh: Central
- Rural District: Kuh Sardeh

Population (2006)
  - Total: 155
- Time zone: UTC+3:30 (IRST)
  - Summer (DST): UTC+4:30 (IRDT)

Qeshlaq-e Shirazi (Persian: قشلاق شيرازي, also Romanized as Qeshlāq-e Shīrāzī) is a village in Kuh Sardeh Rural District, in the Central District of Malayer County, Hamadan Province, Iran. At the 2006 census, its population was 155, in 27 families.
