= Payandeh =

Payandeh پاينده
- Village
- Location within Iran
- Coordinates: 35°26′31″N 48°51′11″E
- Country: Iran
- Province: Hamadan
- County: Razan
- Bakhsh: Sardrud
- Rural District: Sardrud-e Sofla

Population (2006)
  - Total: 429
- Time zone: UTC+3:30 (IRST)
  - Summer (DST): UTC+4:30 (IRDT)

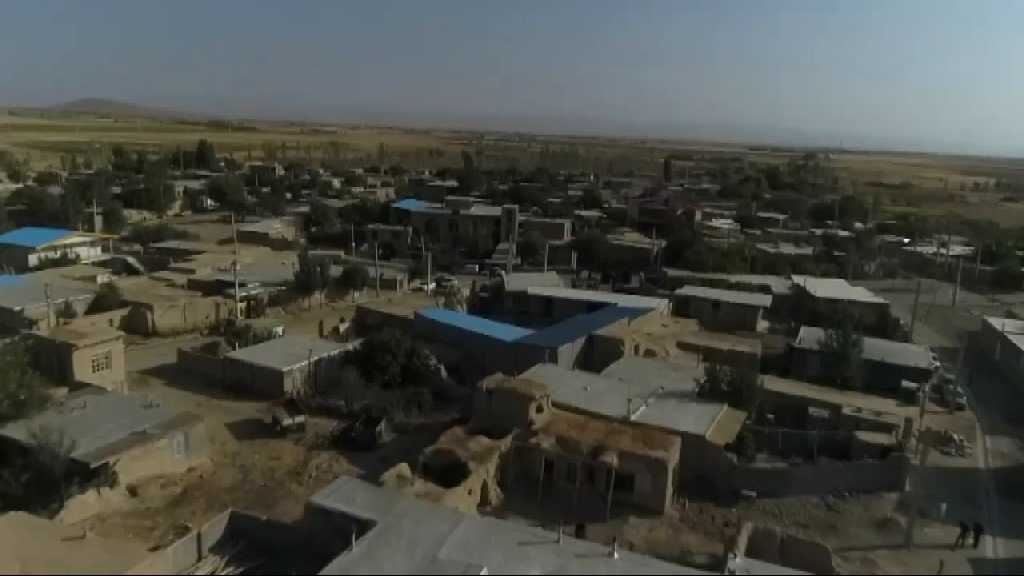
Payandeh village in October 2016

Payandeh (Persian: پاينده, also Romanized as Pāyandeh) is a village in Sardrud-e Sofla Rural District, Sardrud District, Razan County, Hamadan Province, Iran. At the 2006 census, its population was 429, in 114 families.
