= Baba Hesari =

Coordinates: 35°08′03″N 49°19′53″E

Baba Hesari باباحصاری
- Village
- Interactive map of Baba Hesari
- Country: Iran
- Province: Hamadan
- County: Famenin
- Bakhsh: Pish Khowr
- Rural District: Pish Khowr

Population (2006)
  - Total: 125
- Time zone: UTC+3:30 (IRST)
  - Summer (DST): UTC+4:30 (IRDT)

Baba Hesari (Persian: باباحصاری, also Romanized as Bābā Ḩeşārī) is a village in Pish Khowr Rural District, Pish Khowr District, Famenin County, Hamadan Province, Iran. At the 2006 census, its population was 125, in 32 families.
