= Kutah Darreh =

Kutah Darreh كوتاه دره
- Village
- Location within Iran
- Coordinates: 34°19′14″N 47°57′14″E
- Country: Iran
- Province: Hamadan
- County: Nahavand
- Bakhsh: Khezel
- Rural District: Khezel-e Sharqi

Population (2006)
  - Total: 102
- Time zone: UTC+3:30 (IRST)
  - Summer (DST): UTC+4:30 (IRDT)

Kutah Darreh (Persian: كوتاه دره, also Romanized as Kūtāh Darreh) is a village in Khezel-e Sharqi Rural District, Khezel District, Nahavand County, Hamadan Province, Iran. At the 2006 census, its population was 102, in 25 families.
