= Qater Owlan =

Qater Owlan قاطراولن
- Village
- Location within Iran
- Coordinates: 35°22′31″N 48°55′54″E
- Country: Iran
- Province: Hamadan
- County: Razan
- Bakhsh: Central
- Rural District: Razan

Population (2006)
  - Total: 47
- Time zone: UTC+3:30 (IRST)
  - Summer (DST): UTC+4:30 (IRDT)

Qater Owlan (Persian: قاطراولن, also Romanized as Qāţer Owlan, Qāţer Ālan, and Qāţer Olan; also known as Ghater Olan and Qātir Aulan) is a village in Razan Rural District, in the Central District of Razan County, Hamadan Province, Iran. At the 2006 census, its population was 47, in 9 families.
