= Owryad =

Owryad اورياد
- Village
- Location within Iran
- Coordinates: 35°15′46″N 48°22′21″E
- Country: Iran
- Province: Hamadan
- County: Kabudarahang
- Bakhsh: Central
- Rural District: Kuhin

Population (2006)
  - Total: 290
- Time zone: UTC+3:30 (IRST)
  - Summer (DST): UTC+4:30 (IRDT)

Owryad (Persian: اورياد, also Romanized as Owryād, Oryād, and Uryād; also known as Ūryāt) is a village in Kuhin Rural District, in the Central District of Kabudarahang County, Hamadan Province, Iran. At the 2006 census, its population was 290, in 62 families.
