= Darreh Mirza =

Darreh Mirza دره ميرزا
- Village
- Location within Iran
- Coordinates: 34°22′34″N 48°00′27″E
- Country: Iran
- Province: Hamadan
- County: Nahavand
- Bakhsh: Khezel
- Rural District: Khezel-e Sharqi

Population (2006)
  - Total: 349
- Time zone: UTC+3:30 (IRST)
  - Summer (DST): UTC+4:30 (IRDT)

Darreh Mirza (Persian: دره ميرزا, also Romanized as Darreh Mīrzā) is a village in Khezel-e Sharqi Rural District, Khezel District, Nahavand County, Hamadan Province, Iran. At the 2006 census, its population was 349, in 81 families.
