= Azim Darreh =

Azim Darreh عظيم دره
- Village
- Location within Iran
- Coordinates: 35°20′30″N 48°24′47″E
- Country: Iran
- Province: Hamadan
- County: Kabudarahang
- Bakhsh: Gol Tappeh
- Rural District: Ali Sadr

Population (2006)
  - Total: 95
- Time zone: UTC+3:30 (IRST)
  - Summer (DST): UTC+4:30 (IRDT)

Azim Darreh (Persian: عظيم دره, also Romanized as ʿAẓīm Darreh and Aẓīmdarreh) is a village in Ali Sadr Rural District, Gol Tappeh District, Kabudarahang County, Hamadan Province, Iran. At the 2006 census, its population was 95, in 18 families.
