= Deh-e Qarah Chay =

Deh-e Qarah Chay ده قره چاي
- Village
- Country: Iran
- Province: Hamadan
- County: Famenin
- Bakhsh: Pish Khowr
- Rural District: Pish Khowr

Population (2006)
  - Total: 169
- Time zone: UTC+3:30 (IRST)
  - Summer (DST): UTC+4:30 (IRDT)

Deh-e Qarah Chay (Persian: ده قره چاي, also Romanized as Deh-e Qarah Chāy) is a village in Pish Khowr Rural District, Pish Khowr District, Famenin County, Hamadan Province, Iran. At the 2006 census, its population was 169, in 42 families.
