= Yarom Qayah =

Yarom Qayah يارمقيه
- Village
- Location within Iran
- Coordinates: 35°04′08″N 49°22′54″E
- Country: Iran
- Province: Hamadan
- County: Famenin
- Bakhsh: Pish Khowr
- Rural District: Pish Khowr

Population (2006)
  - Total: 33
- Time zone: UTC+3:30 (IRST)
  - Summer (DST): UTC+4:30 (IRDT)

Yarom Qayah (Persian: يارمقيه, also Romanized as Yārom Qayah and Yārom Qayeh; also known as Yāramgiya) is a village in Pish Khowr Rural District, Pish Khowr District, Famenin County, Hamadan Province, Iran. At the 2006 census, its population was 33, in 10 families.
