= Aqchelu =

Aqchelu اقچلو
- Village
- Location within Iran
- Coordinates: 35°07′53″N 48°29′30″E
- Country: Iran
- Province: Hamadan
- County: Kabudarahang
- Bakhsh: Central
- Rural District: Sardaran

Population (2006)
  - Total: 464
- Time zone: UTC+3:30 (IRST)
  - Summer (DST): UTC+4:30 (IRDT)

Aqchelu (Persian: اقچلو, also Romanized as Āqchelū and Oqchelū; also known as Okhchaloo, Okh Chalū, Ukhchalu, and Ūkhchelū) is a village in Sardaran Rural District, in the Central District of Kabudarahang County, Hamadan Province, Iran. At the 2006 census, its population was 464, in 114 families.
