= Buyaqchi =

Buyaqchi بوياقچي
- Village
- Location within Iran
- Coordinates: 34°50′51″N 49°05′21″E
- Country: Iran
- Province: Hamadan
- County: Hamadan
- Bakhsh: Shara
- Rural District: Jeyhun Dasht

Population (2006)
  - Total: 179
- Time zone: UTC+3:30 (IRST)
  - Summer (DST): UTC+4:30 (IRDT)

Buyaqchi (Persian: بوياقچي, also Romanized as Būyāqchī and Buiakhchi; also known as Bowyākhchī, Boyaghchi, and Boyāqchī) is a village in Jeyhun Dasht Rural District, Shara District, Hamadan County, Hamadan Province, Iran. At the 2006 census, its population was 179, in 34 families.
