= Kheyr Qoli =

Kheyr Qoli خيرقلي
- Village
- Location within Iran
- Coordinates: 34°12′08″N 48°24′05″E
- Country: Iran
- Province: Hamadan
- County: Nahavand
- Bakhsh: Central
- Rural District: Shaban

Population (2006)
  - Total: 34
- Time zone: UTC+3:30 (IRST)
  - Summer (DST): UTC+4:30 (IRDT)

Kheyr Qoli (Persian: خيرقلي, also Romanized as Kheyr Qolī) is a village in Shaban Rural District, in the Central District of Nahavand County, Hamadan Province, Iran. At the 2006 census, its population was 34, in 9 families.
