= Jin Taraqayah =

Jin Taraqayah جين طراقيه
- Village
- Location within Iran
- Coordinates: 35°20′44″N 48°25′57″E
- Country: Iran
- Province: Hamadan
- County: Kabudarahang
- Bakhsh: Gol Tappeh
- Rural District: Ali Sadr

Population (2006)
  - Total: 312
- Time zone: UTC+3:30 (IRST)
  - Summer (DST): UTC+4:30 (IRDT)

Jin Taraqayah (Persian: جين طراقيه, also Romanized as Jīn Ţarāqayah, Jīn Ţarāqayeh, and Jīn Ţarā Qayeh; also known as Chanchirāgheh, Chand Cherāgheh, and Jen Ţarāqayeh) is a village in Ali Sadr Rural District, Gol Tappeh District, Kabudarahang County, Hamadan Province, Iran. At the 2006 census, its population was 312, in 70 families.
