= Tazehnab-e Vosta =

Tazehnab-e Vosta تازه‌ناب وسطی
- village
- Country: Iran
- Province: Hamadan
- County: Nahavand
- Bakhsh: Central
- Rural District: Shaban

Population (2006)
  - Total: 235
- Time zone: UTC+3:30 (IRST)
  - Summer (DST): UTC+4:30 (IRDT)

Tazehnab-e Vosta (Persian: تازه‌ناب وسطی, also Romanized as Tāzehnāb-e Vosţá) is a village in Shaban Rural District, in the Central District of Nahavand County, Hamadan Province, Iran. At the 2006 census, its population was 235, in 61 families.
