= Qadimi =

Qadimi قديمي
- Village
- Location within Iran
- Coordinates: 34°39′07″N 48°44′12″E
- Country: Iran
- Province: Hamadan
- County: Malayer
- Bakhsh: Jowkar
- Rural District: Tork-e Gharbi

Population (2006)
  - Total: 90
- Time zone: UTC+3:30 (IRST)
  - Summer (DST): UTC+4:30 (IRDT)

Qadimi (Persian: قديمي, also Romanized as Qadīmī) is a village in Tork-e Gharbi Rural District, Jowkar District, Malayer County, Hamadan Province, Iran. At the 2006 census, its population was 90, in 24 families.
