= Pol Shekasteh, Hamadan =

Pol Shekasteh پل شكسته
- Village
- Location within Iran
- Coordinates: 34°47′35″N 48°43′12″E
- Country: Iran
- Province: Hamadan
- County: Hamadan
- Bakhsh: Central
- Rural District: Sangestan

Population (2006)
  - Total: 11
- Time zone: UTC+3:30 (IRST)
  - Summer (DST): UTC+4:30 (IRDT)

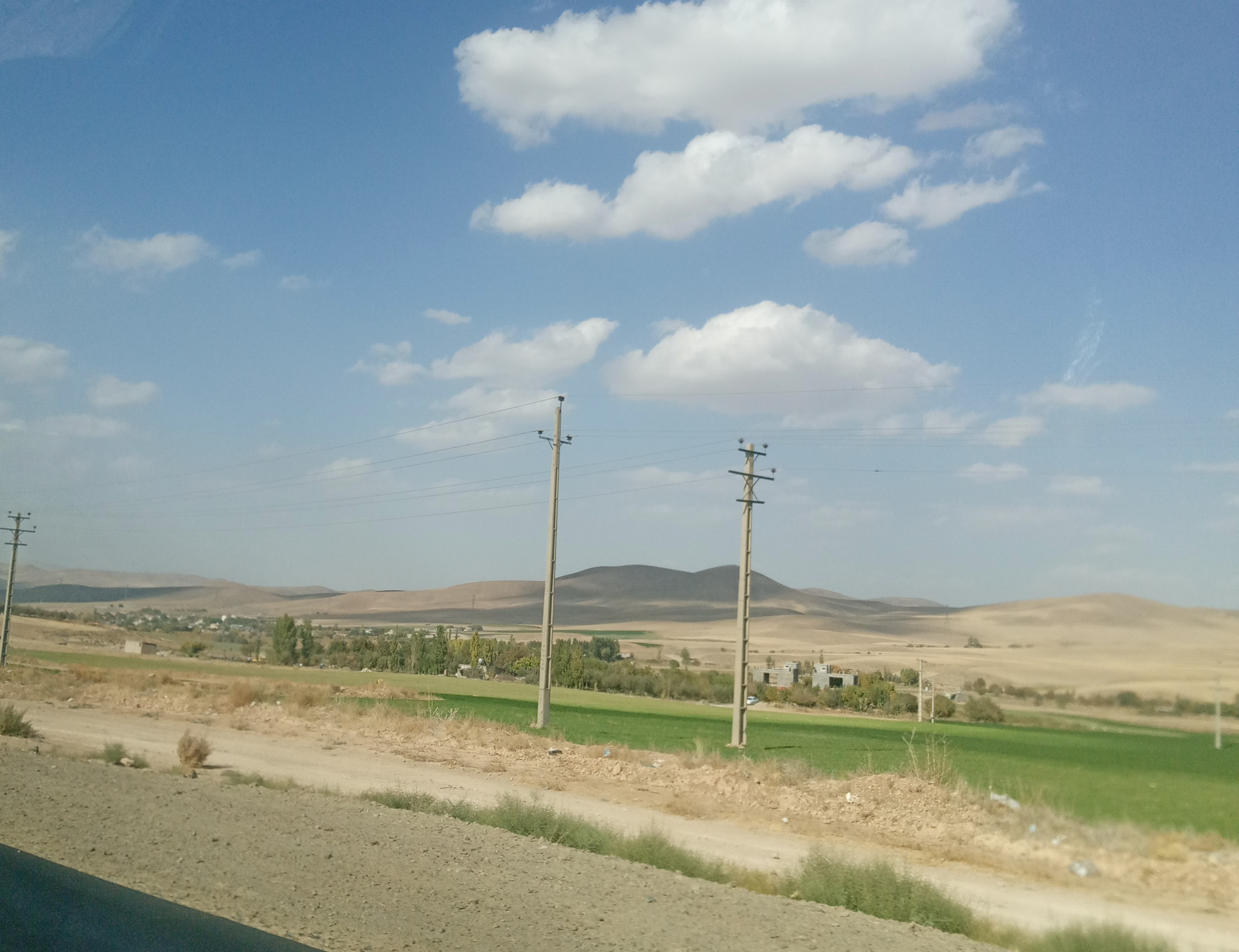

Pol Shekasteh (Persian: پل شكسته) is a village in Sangestan Rural District, in the Central District of Hamadan County, Hamadan Province, Iran. At the 2006 census, its population was 11, in 5 families.
