= Qaleh Now-e Gunesban =

Village in Hamadan, Iran

Qaleh Now-e Gunesban قلعه نوگونسبان
- Village
- Location within Iran
- Coordinates: 34°07′00″N 49°04′00″E
- Country: Iran
- Province: Hamadan
- County: Malayer
- Bakhsh: Zand
- Rural District: Kamazan-e Sofla

Population (2006)
  - Total: 300
- Time zone: UTC+3:30 (IRST)
  - Summer (DST): UTC+4:30 (IRDT)

Qaleh Now-e Gunesban (Persian: قلعه نوگونسبان, also Romanized as Qal‘eh Now-e Gūnsebān; also known as Qal‘eh Now and Qal‘eh Now-ye Parī) is a village in Kamazan-e Sofla Rural District, Zand District, Malayer County, Hamadan Province, Iran. At the 2006 census, its population was 300, in 71 families.
