= Mirzaiyeh =

Mirzaiyeh ميرزاييه
- Village
- Location within Iran
- Coordinates: 34°26′07″N 48°52′51″E
- Country: Iran
- Province: Hamadan
- County: Malayer
- Bakhsh: Jowkar
- Rural District: Jowkar

Population (2006)
  - Total: 80
- Time zone: UTC+3:30 (IRST)
  - Summer (DST): UTC+4:30 (IRDT)

Mirzaiyeh (Persian: ميرزاييه, also Romanized as Mīrzā’īyeh; also known as Mīrzā Bareh) is a village in Jowkar Rural District, Jowkar District, Malayer County, Hamadan Province, Iran. At the 2006 census, its population was 80, in 21 families. The original name of the village was Mir-zawwara. Mir-zawwara means Mir (commander) Zawwar (pilgrims). According to the oral history of the inhabitants of this place, the pilgrims who went to Iraq for pilgrimages had to stay in the village's barracks and resume their journey.
