= Vezendan =

Vezendan وزندان
- Village
- Location within Iran
- Coordinates: 34°57′29″N 49°18′45″E
- Country: Iran
- Province: Hamadan
- County: Famenin
- Bakhsh: Pish Khowr
- Rural District: Pish Khowr
- Elevation: 1,850 m (6,070 ft)

Population (2016)
  - Total: 97
- Time zone: UTC+3:30 (IRST)
  - Summer (DST): UTC+4:30 (IRDT)

Vezendan (Persian: وزندان, also Romanized as Vezendān and Vazandān) is a village in Pish Khowr Rural District, Pish Khowr District, Famenin County, Hamadan Province, Iran. At the 2016 census, its population was 97, in 32 families.

== Language ==
It is an Azeri Turkic speaking village.

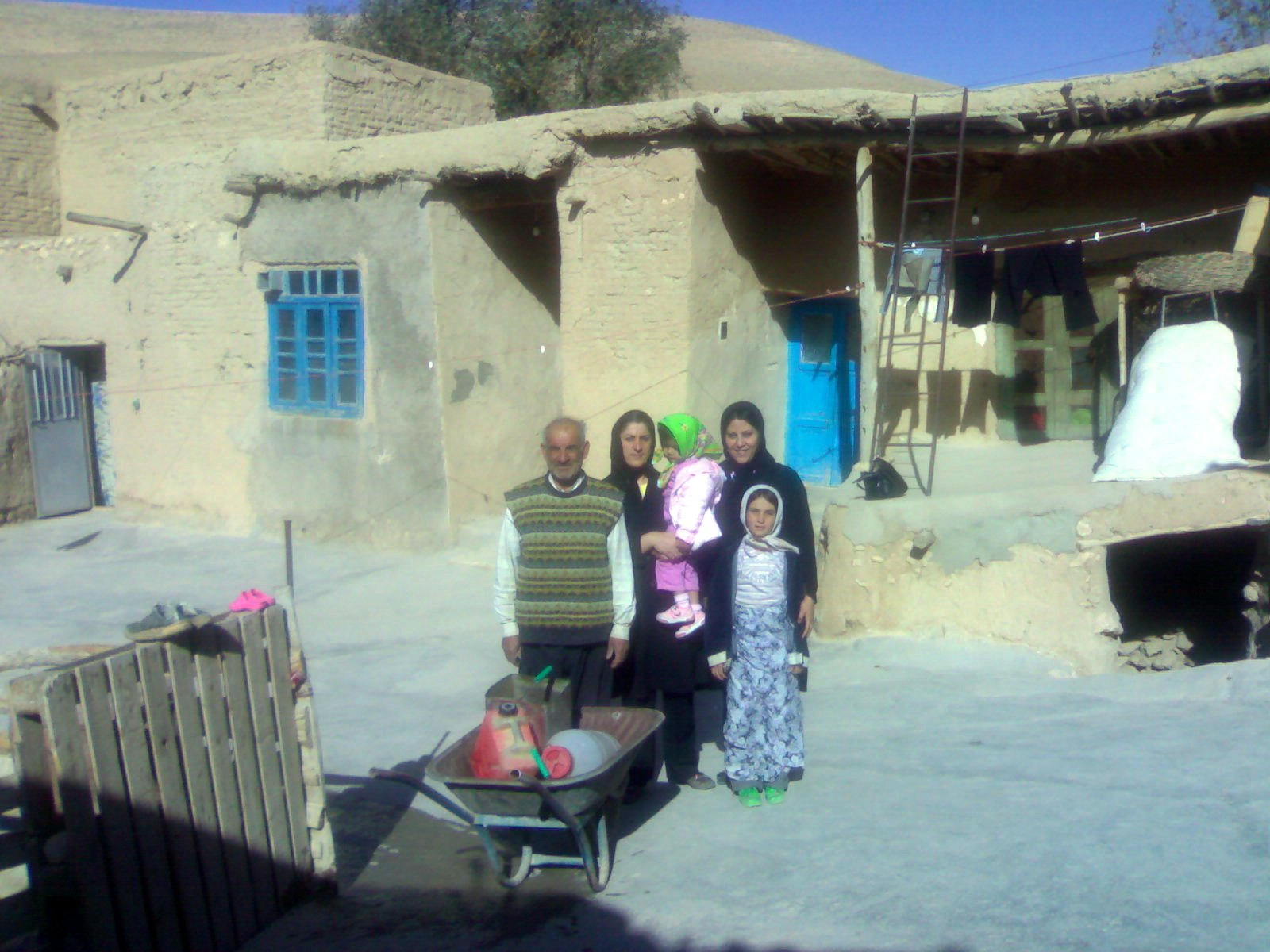
خانه روستایی

== gallery ==
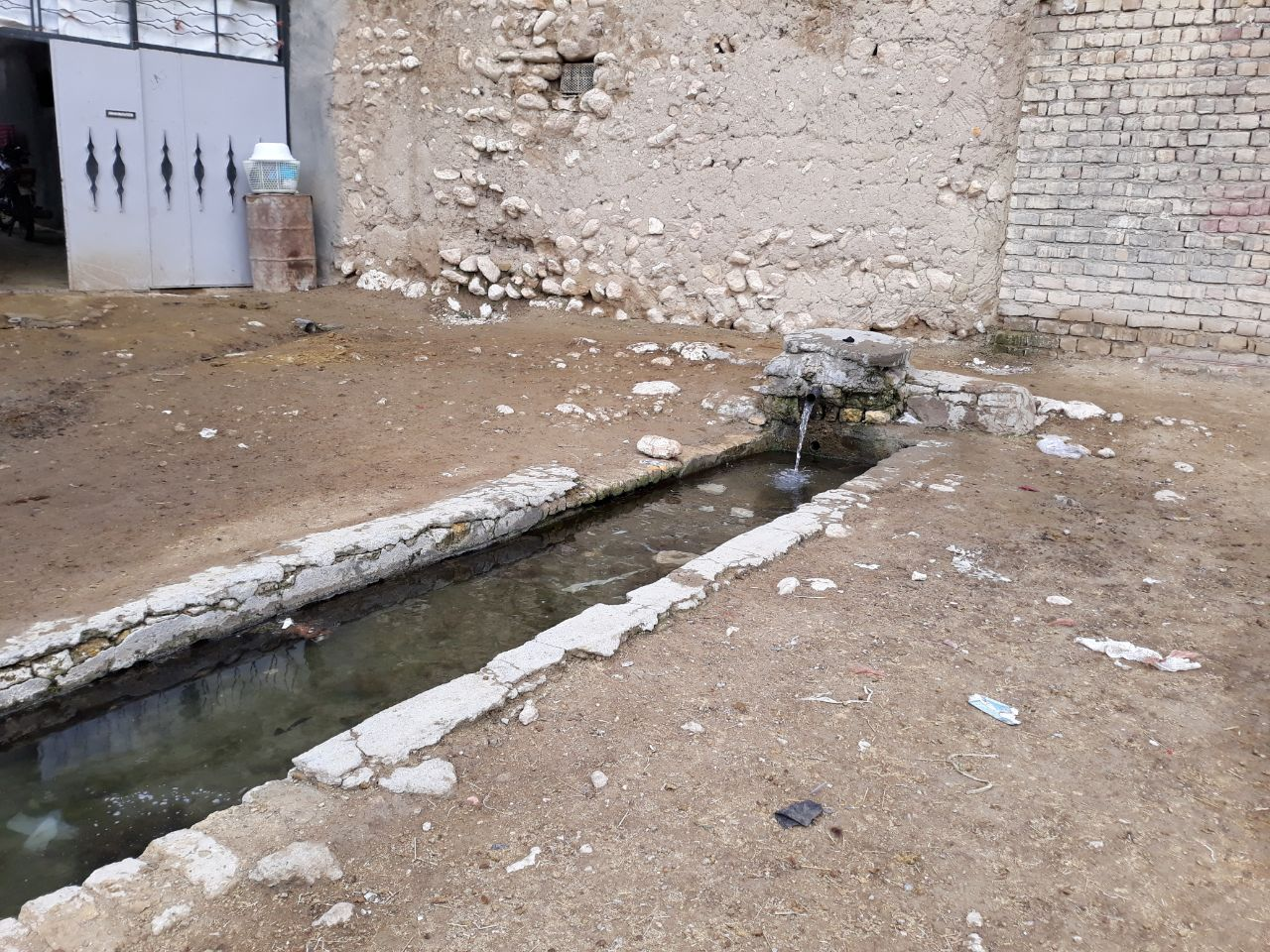
چشمه روستای وزندان

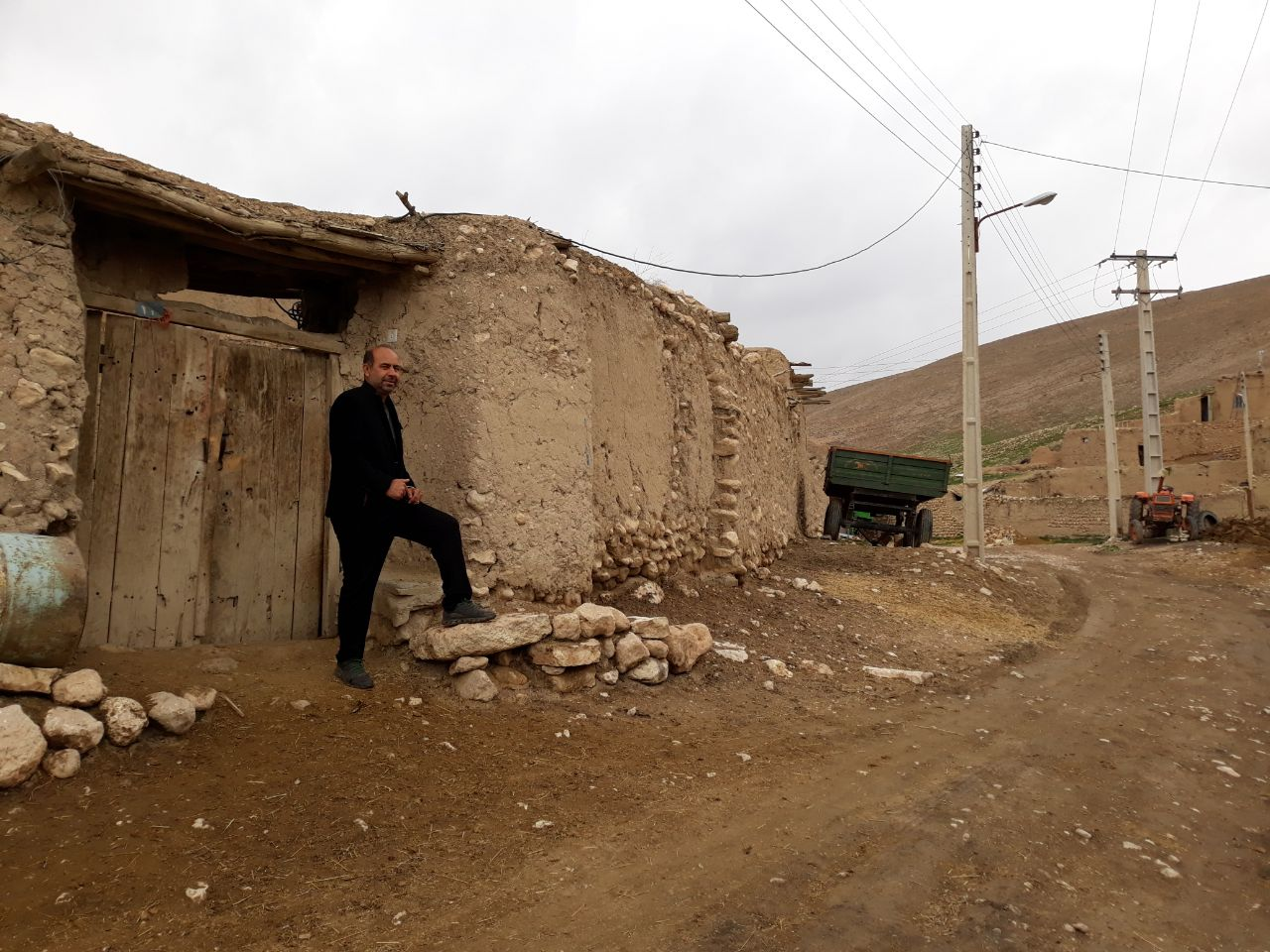
خانه های روستایی

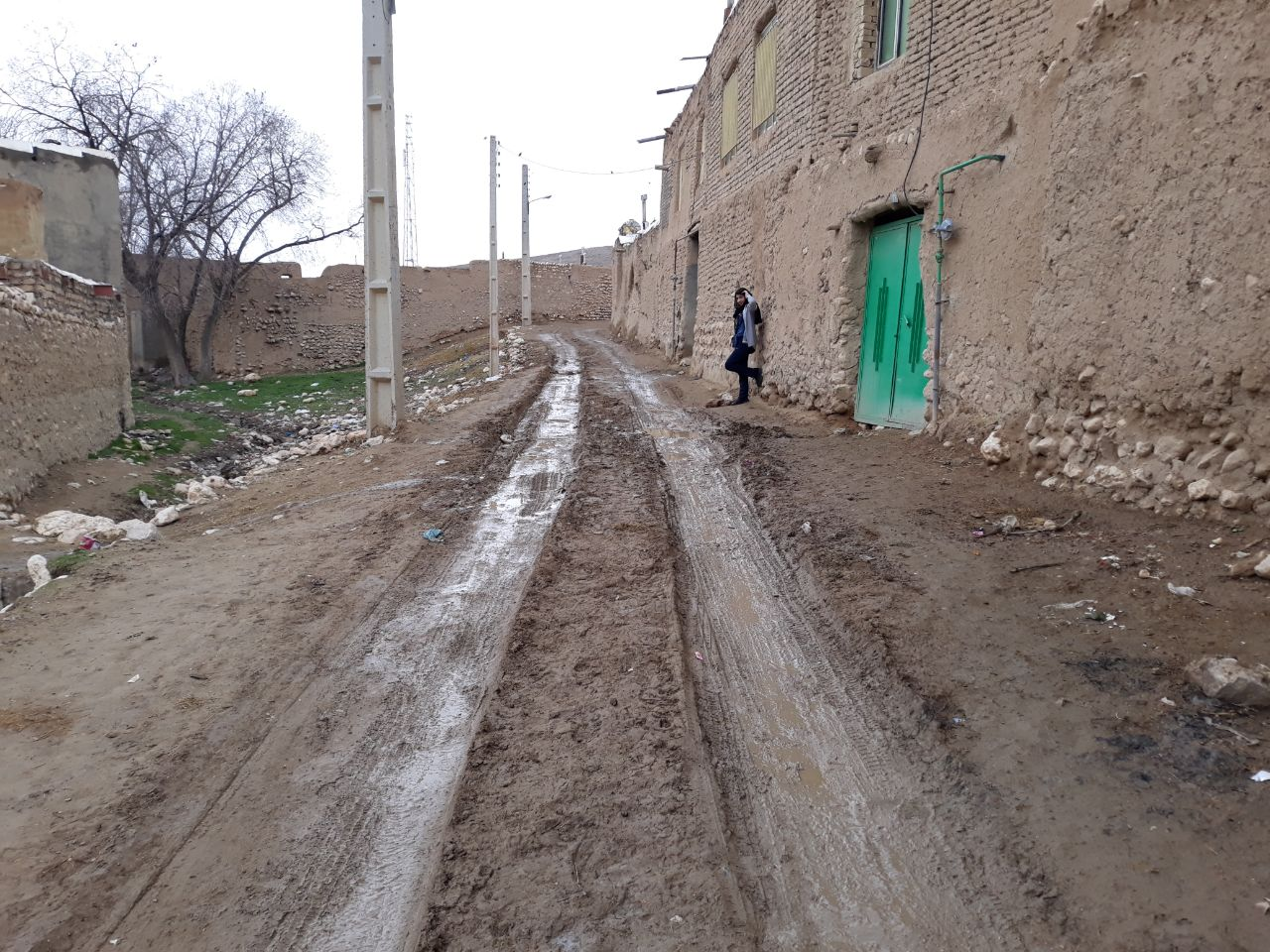
خیابان های وزندان

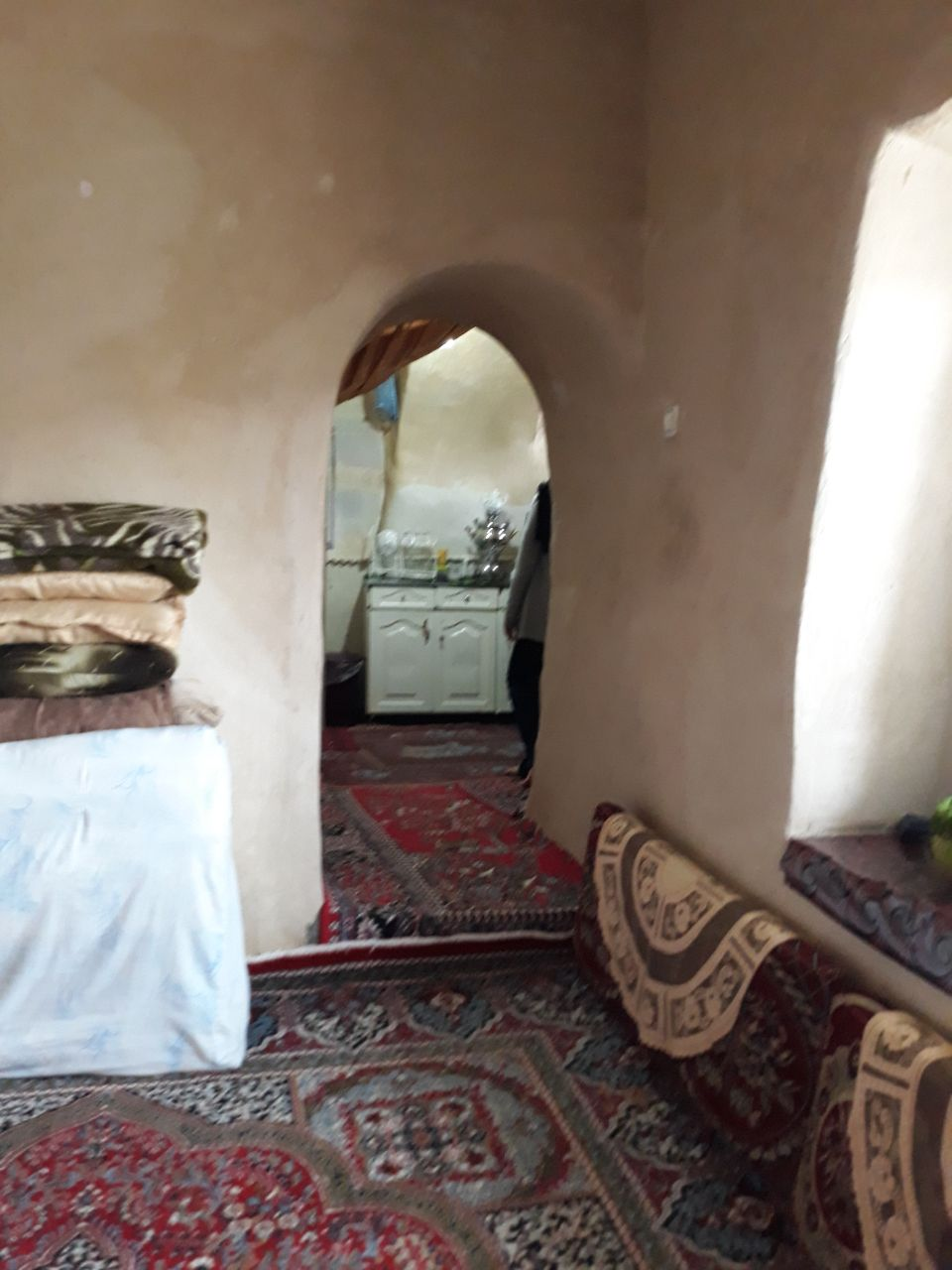
سبک خانه های روستای وزندان
