= Tappeh Ali =

Tappeh Ali تپه علي
- Village
- Location within Iran
- Coordinates: 34°15′04″N 48°01′26″E
- Country: Iran
- Province: Hamadan
- County: Nahavand
- Bakhsh: Khezel
- Rural District: Solgi

Population (2006)
  - Total: 145
- Time zone: UTC+3:30 (IRST)
  - Summer (DST): UTC+4:30 (IRDT)

Tappeh Ali (Persian: تپه علي, also Romanized as Tappeh ‘Alī and Tappeh-ye ‘Alī) is a village in Solgi Rural District, Khezel District, Nahavand County, Hamadan Province, Iran. At the 2006 census, its population was 145, in 32 families.
