= Qabanqoli =

Qabanqoli قبان قلي
- Village
- Location within Iran
- Coordinates: 35°11′54″N 49°10′42″E
- Country: Iran
- Province: Hamadan
- County: Famenin
- Bakhsh: Pish Khowr
- Rural District: Pish Khowr

Population (2006)
  - Total: 18
- Time zone: UTC+3:30 (IRST)
  - Summer (DST): UTC+4:30 (IRDT)

Qabanqoli (Persian: قبان قلي, also Romanized as Qābānqolī; also known as Qābān ‘Alī and Qabānglu) is a village in Pish Khowr Rural District, Pish Khowr District, Famenin County, Hamadan Province, Iran. According to the 2006 Census, there were 18 people total there, including 7 families.
