= Kamankaran =

Kamankaran كمانكران
- Village
- Location within Iran
- Coordinates: 34°26′56″N 48°08′38″E
- Country: Iran
- Province: Hamadan
- County: Tuyserkan
- Bakhsh: Qolqol Rud
- Rural District: Miyan Rud

Population (2006)
  - Total: 385
- Time zone: UTC+3:30 (IRST)
  - Summer (DST): UTC+4:30 (IRDT)

Kamankaran (Persian: كمانكران, also Romanized as Kamānkarān; also known as Kamāngarān) is a village in Miyan Rud Rural District, Qolqol Rud District, Tuyserkan County, Hamadan Province, Iran. At the 2006 census, its population was 385, in 91 families.
