= Ravand-e Vosta =

Ravand-e Vosta راوندوسطي
- Village
- Location within Iran
- Coordinates: 34°08′00″N 48°20′57″E
- Country: Iran
- Province: Hamadan
- County: Nahavand
- Bakhsh: Central
- Rural District: Shaban

Population (2006)
  - Total: 47
- Time zone: UTC+3:30 (IRST)
  - Summer (DST): UTC+4:30 (IRDT)

Ravand-e Vosta (Persian: راوندوسطي, also Romanized as Rāvand-e Vosţá; also known as Rāvand and Rāvand-e Soflá) is a village in Shaban Rural District, in the Central District of Nahavand County, Hamadan Province, Iran. At the 2006 census, its population was 47, in 11 families.
