= Banesareh =

Banesareh بانسره
- Village
- Location within Iran
- Coordinates: 34°14′15″N 48°26′00″E
- Country: Iran
- Province: Hamadan
- County: Nahavand
- Bakhsh: Central
- Rural District: Shaban

Population (2006)
  - Total: 393
- Time zone: UTC+3:30 (IRST)
  - Summer (DST): UTC+4:30 (IRDT)

Banesareh (Persian: بانسره, also Romanized as Bānesareh and Bān Sareh; also known as Bāsareh, Bonehsar, and Pānsareh) is a village in Shaban Rural District, in the Central District of Nahavand County, Hamadan Province, Iran. At the 2006 census, its population was 393, in 89 families.
