= Qaleh-ye Barudab =

Village in Hamadan, Iran

Qaleh-ye Barudab قلعه باروداب
- Village
- Location within Iran
- Coordinates: 34°12′56″N 48°25′31″E
- Country: Iran
- Province: Hamadan
- County: Nahavand
- Bakhsh: Central
- Rural District: Shaban

Population (2006)
  - Total: 47
- Time zone: UTC+3:30 (IRST)
  - Summer (DST): UTC+4:30 (IRDT)

Qaleh-ye Barudab (Persian: قلعه باروداب, also Romanized as Qal‘eh-ye Bārūdāb; also known as Qai‘eh-ye Dārāb, Qal‘eh-ye Bārūt Āb, and Qal‘eh-ye Dārāb) is a village in Shaban Rural District, in the Central District of Nahavand County, Hamadan Province, Iran. At the 2006 census, its population was 47, in 14 families.
