= Sorkh Kand =

Village in Hamadan, Iran

Sorkh Kand سرخ كند
- Village
- Location within Iran
- Coordinates: 34°05′15″N 48°25′45″E
- Country: Iran
- Province: Hamadan
- County: Nahavand
- Bakhsh: Central
- Rural District: Gamasiyab

Population (2006)
  - Total: 177
- Time zone: UTC+3:30 (IRST)
  - Summer (DST): UTC+4:30 (IRDT)

Sorkh Kand (Persian: سرخ كند) is a village in Gamasiyab Rural District, in the Central District of Nahavand County, Hamadan Province, Iran. At the 2006 census, its population was 177, in 44 families.
