= Hasan Kusej =

Hasan Kusej حسن كوسج
- Village
- Location within Iran
- Coordinates: 34°14′54″N 48°34′31″E
- Country: Iran
- Province: Hamadan
- County: Malayer
- Bakhsh: Samen
- Rural District: Haram Rud-e Sofla

Population (2006)
  - Total: 117
- Time zone: UTC+3:30 (IRST)
  - Summer (DST): UTC+4:30 (IRDT)

Hasan Kusej (Persian: حسن كوسج, also Romanized as Ḩasan Kūsej, Hasan Koosej, and Ḩasan Kūsaj) is a village in Haram Rud-e Sofla Rural District, Samen District, Malayer County, Hamadan Province, Iran. At the 2006 census, its population was 117, in 32 families.
