= Qeshlaq-e Mohammadi =

Qeshlaq-e Mohammadi قشلاق محمدي
- Village
- Location within Iran
- Coordinates: 34°04′00″N 48°55′00″E
- Country: Iran
- Province: Hamadan
- County: Malayer
- Bakhsh: Zand
- Rural District: Kamazan-e Sofla

Population (2006)
  - Total: 75
- Time zone: UTC+3:30 (IRST)
  - Summer (DST): UTC+4:30 (IRDT)

Qeshlaq-e Mohammadi (Persian: قشلاق محمدي, also Romanized as Qeshlāq-e Moḩammadī; also known as Gheshlagh) is a village in Kamazan-e Sofla Rural District, Zand District, Malayer County, Hamadan Province, Iran. At the 2006 census, its population was 75, in 13 families.
