= Jijian Rud =

Jijian Rud جيجان رود
- Village
- Location within Iran
- Coordinates: 34°21′23″N 48°36′31″E
- Country: Iran
- Province: Hamadan
- County: Malayer
- Bakhsh: Samen
- Rural District: Haram Rud-e Sofla

Population (2006)
  - Total: 274
- Time zone: UTC+3:30 (IRST)
  - Summer (DST): UTC+4:30 (IRDT)

Jijian Rud (Persian: جيجان رود, also Romanized as Jījīān Rūd and Jījeyānrūd; also known as Jeyjān Rūd) is a village in Haram Rud-e Sofla Rural District, Samen District, Malayer County, Hamadan Province, Iran. At the 2006 census, its population was 274, in 70 families.
