= Gavkaran =

Gavkaran گاوكران
- Village
- Location within Iran
- Coordinates: 34°29′13″N 48°07′12″E
- Country: Iran
- Province: Hamadan
- County: Tuyserkan
- Bakhsh: Qolqol Rud
- Rural District: Miyan Rud

Population (2006)
  - Total: 144
- Time zone: UTC+3:30 (IRST)
  - Summer (DST): UTC+4:30 (IRDT)

Gavkaran (Persian: گاوكران, also Romanized as Gāvkarān, Gav Karan, and Gāv Korān) is a village in Miyan Rud Rural District, Qolqol Rud District, Tuyserkan County, Hamadan Province, Iran. At the 2006 census, its population was 144, in 23 families.
