= Najafiyeh =

Pilangorg پیلانگرگ
- village
- Location within Iran
- Coordinates: 34°33′18″N 48°23′11″E
- Country: Iran
- Province: Hamadan
- County: Tuyserkan
- Bakhsh: Central
- Rural District: Hayaquq-e Nabi

Population (2016)
  - Total: 190
- Time zone: UTC+3:30 (IRST)
  - Summer (DST): UTC+4:30 (IRDT)

Pilangorg (Persian: پیلانگرگ, also Romanized as Pīlān Gorg; also known as najafiyeh ) is a village in Hayaquq-e Nabi Rural District, in the Central District of Tuyserkan County, Hamadan Province, Iran. At the 2016 census, its population was 190, in 84 families.
