= Yunji, Hamadan =

Yunji يونجي
- Village
- Location within Iran
- Coordinates: 34°21′31″N 48°46′54″E
- Country: Iran
- Province: Hamadan
- County: Malayer
- Bakhsh: Central
- Rural District: Haram Rud-e Olya

Population (2006)
  - Total: 128
- Time zone: UTC+3:30 (IRST)
  - Summer (DST): UTC+4:30 (IRDT)

Yunji (Persian: يونجي, also Romanized as Yūnjī; also known as Yonji and Yūbjī) is a village in Haram Rud-e Olya Rural District, in the Central District of Malayer County, Hamadan Province, Iran. At the 2006 census, its population was 128, in 29 families.
