= Charoq =

Charoq چارق
- Village
- Location within Iran
- Coordinates: 34°50′39″N 48°03′58″E
- Country: Iran
- Province: Hamadan
- County: Asadabad
- Bakhsh: Central
- Rural District: Chaharduli

Population (2006)
  - Total: 219
- Time zone: UTC+3:30 (IRST)
  - Summer (DST): UTC+4:30 (IRDT)

Charoq (Persian: چارق, also Romanized as Chāroq and Chāreq; also known as Chārūq) is a village in Chaharduli Rural District, in the Central District of Asadabad County, Hamadan Province, Iran. At the 2006 census, its population was 219, in 59 families.
