= Aghcheh Kharabeh =

Aghcheh Kharabeh اغچه خرابه
- Village
- Location within Iran
- Coordinates: 35°28′34″N 49°00′33″E
- Country: Iran
- Province: Hamadan
- County: Razan
- Bakhsh: Central
- Rural District: Kharqan

Population (2006)
  - Total: 176
- Time zone: UTC+3:30 (IRST)
  - Summer (DST): UTC+4:30 (IRDT)

Aghcheh Kharabeh (Persian: اغچه خرابه, also Romanized as Āghcheh Kharābeh) is a village in Kharqan Rural District, in the Central District of Razan County, Hamadan Province, Iran. At the 2006 census, its population was 176, in 40 families.
