= Molham Darreh =

Molham Darreh ملهمدره
- Village
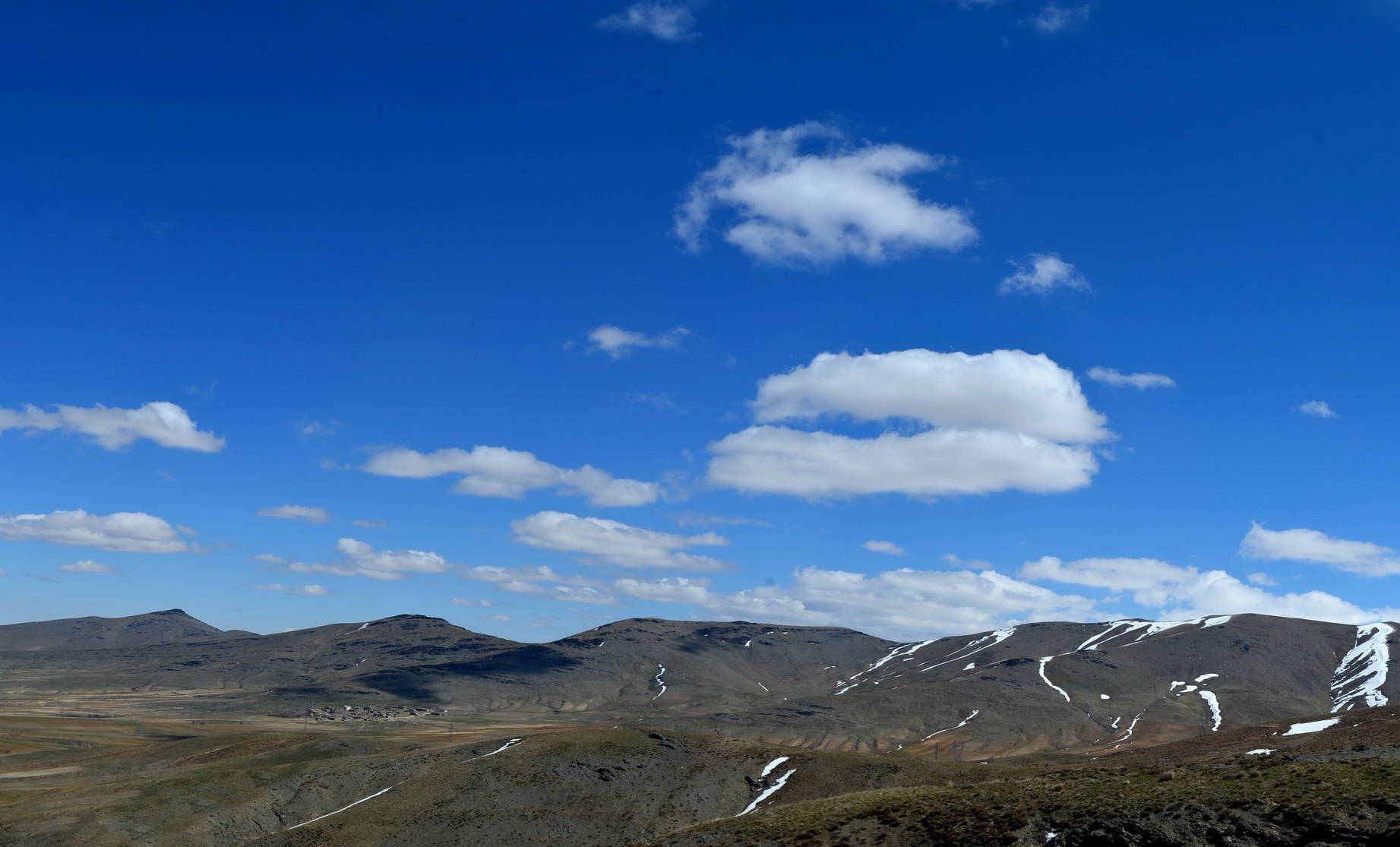
- Mountains in Molham Dareh

- Location within Iran
- Coordinates: 34°49′53″N 48°08′43″E
- Country: Iran
- Province: Hamadan
- County: Asadabad
- Bakhsh: Central
- Rural District: Seyyed Jamal ol Din

Population (2006)
  - Total: 402
- Time zone: UTC+3:30 (IRST)
  - Summer (DST): UTC+4:30 (IRDT)

Molham Darreh (Persian: ملهمدره, also Romanized as Molhamdareh, Malham Dareh, and Malham Darreh; also known as Molāmadar, Molhamdar, and Malamdar) is a village in Seyyed Jamal ol Din Rural District, in the Central District of Asadabad County, Hamadan Province, Iran. At the 2006 census, its population was 402, in 111 families.

== Location ==
The village is located in Iran.
