= Pir Mishan =

Pir Mishan پيرميشان
- Village
- Location within Iran
- Coordinates: 34°23′30″N 48°39′58″E
- Country: Iran
- Province: Hamadan
- County: Malayer
- Bakhsh: Jowkar
- Rural District: Jowkar

Population (2006)
  - Total: 104
- Time zone: UTC+3:30 (IRST)
  - Summer (DST): UTC+4:30 (IRDT)

Pir Mishan (Persian: پيرميشان, also Romanized as Pīr Mīshān; also known as Pīr Meshān and Pirmashān) is a village in Jowkar Rural District, Jowkar District, Malayer County, Hamadan Province, Iran. At the 2006 census, its population was 104, in 27 families.
