= Darreh-ye Ebrahim =

Darreh-ye Ebrahim دره ابراهيم
- Village
- Location within Iran
- Coordinates: 34°06′06″N 48°23′40″E
- Country: Iran
- Province: Hamadan
- County: Nahavand
- Bakhsh: Central
- Rural District: Shaban

Population (2006)
  - Total: 473
- Time zone: UTC+3:30 (IRST)
  - Summer (DST): UTC+4:30 (IRDT)

Darreh-ye Ebrahim (Persian: دره ابراهيم, also Romanized as Darreh-ye Ebrāhīm and Darreh Ebrāhīm) is a village in Shaban Rural District, in the Central District of Nahavand County, Hamadan Province, Iran. At the 2006 census, its population was 473, in 131 families.
