= Choqa Sarahi =

Village in Hamadan, Iran

Choqa Sarahi چقاصراحي
- Village
- Location within Iran
- Coordinates: 34°18′55″N 48°02′56″E
- Country: Iran
- Province: Hamadan
- County: Nahavand
- Bakhsh: Khezel
- Rural District: Khezel-e Sharqi

Population (2006)
  - Total: 236
- Time zone: UTC+3:30 (IRST)
  - Summer (DST): UTC+4:30 (IRDT)

Choqa Sarahi (Persian: چقاصراحي, also Romanized as Choqā Şarāḩī, Chaqa Sorahi, and Cheqā Şarāḩī; also known as Cheqā Sarā’īl, Choghā Sarā’īl, and Choghā Sera) is a village in Khezel-e Sharqi Rural District, Khezel District, Nahavand County, Hamadan province, Iran. At the 2006 census, its population was 236, in 62 families.
