= Pa Tappeh-ye Gunesban =

Pa Tappeh-ye Gunesban پاتپه گونسبان
- Village
- Location within Iran
- Coordinates: 34°02′42″N 48°54′17″E
- Country: Iran
- Province: Hamadan
- County: Malayer
- Bakhsh: Zand
- Rural District: Kamazan-e Sofla

Population (2006)
  - Total: 114
- Time zone: UTC+3:30 (IRST)
  - Summer (DST): UTC+4:30 (IRDT)

Pa Tappeh-ye Gunesban (Persian: پاتپه گونسبان, also Romanized as Pā Tappeh-ye Gūnespān; also known as Pā Tappeh and Pā Tappeh Kūnsbān) is a village in Kamazan-e Sofla Rural District, Zand District, Malayer County, Hamadan Province, Iran. At the 2006 census its population was 114, in 37 families.
