= Saluk =

Village in Hamadan, Iran

Saluk سالوك
- Village
- Location within Iran
- Coordinates: 34°20′29″N 48°59′35″E
- Country: Iran
- Province: Hamadan
- County: Malayer
- Bakhsh: Central
- Rural District: Kuh Sardeh

Population (2006)
  - Total: 117
- Time zone: UTC+3:30 (IRST)
  - Summer (DST): UTC+4:30 (IRDT)

Saluk (Persian: سالوك, also Romanized as Sālūk) is a village in Kuh Sardeh Rural District, in the Central District of Malayer County, Hamadan Province, Iran. At the 2006 census, its population was 117, in 26 families.
