= Aqa Jan Bolaghi =

Aqa Jan Bolaghi اقاجان بلاغي
- Village
- Location within Iran
- Coordinates: 34°50′45″N 48°03′11″E
- Country: Iran
- Province: Hamadan
- County: Asadabad
- Bakhsh: Central
- Rural District: Chaharduli

Population (2006)
  - Total: 274
- Time zone: UTC+3:30 (IRST)
  - Summer (DST): UTC+4:30 (IRDT)

Aqa Jan Bolaghi (Persian: اقاجان بلاغي, also Romanized as Āqā Jān Bolāghī) is a village in Chaharduli Rural District, in the Central District of Asadabad County, Hamadan Province, Iran. At the 2006 census, its population was 274, in 65 families.
