= Namazgah =

Namazgah (Persian: نمازگاه, romanized: Namāzgāh, lit. 'Place of Prayer') may refer to:

== Albania ==
- Namazgjah, Elbasan
- Namazgah Mosque, Tirana

== Iran ==
- Namazgah, Fars
- Namazgah, Hamadan
- Namazgah, Kurdistan

== Azerbaijan ==
- Namazgah, Azerbaijan

== Turkmenistan ==
- Namazga-Tepe, a Bronze Age (BMAC) archaeological site in Turkmenistan

== Turkey ==
- Namazgah, Yenice
