= Rahmanabad-e Anuch, Malayer =

Village in Hamadan province, Iran

Rahmanabad-e Anuch Persian: رحمن ابادانوچ
- Village
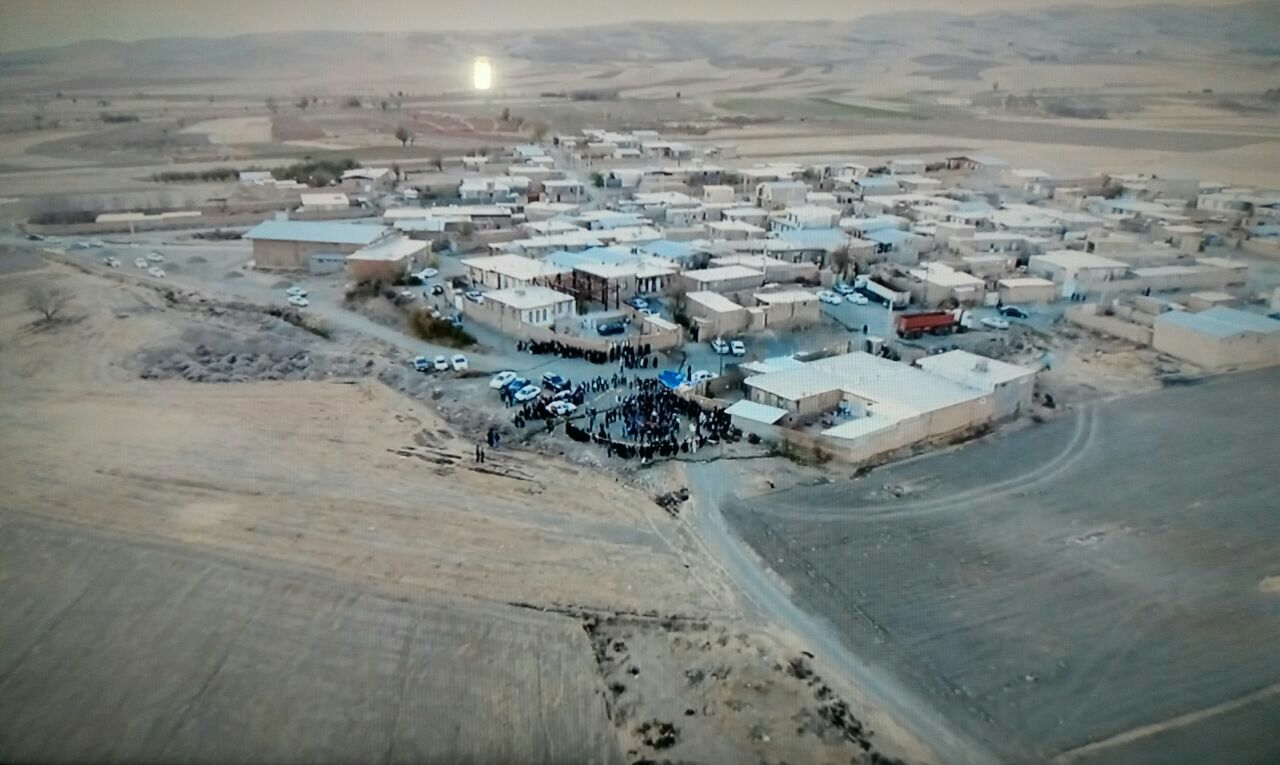
- The village of Rahmanabad-e Anuch

- Location within Iran
- Coordinates: 34°05′18″N 48°35′07″E
- Country: Iran
- Province: Hamadan
- County: Malayer
- District: Samen
- Rural District: Sefidkuh
- Elevation: 1,870 m (6,140 ft)

Population (2016)
  - Total: 385
- Time zone: UTC+3:30 (IRST)

Rahmanabad-e Anuch (Persian: رحمن ابادانوچ) (Note: Also romanized as Raḩmanābād-e Anūch; also known as Raḩmānābād and Raḩmānābād-e Anūj) is a village in Sefidkuh Rural District of Samen District in Malayer County, Hamadan province, Iran.

== Demographics ==
=== Language ===
The village's residents speak the Northern Lori dialect.

=== Population ===
At the time of the 2006 National Census, the village's population was 399 in 108 households. The following census in 2011 counted 420 people in 127 households. The 2016 census measured the population of the village as 385 people in 121 households.

== Geography ==
The distance from Rahmanabad-e Anuch to the city of Malayer is 39 km. The village is near the border of Hamadan province with Lorestan province and is adjacent to the villages of Gol Darreh and Anuch.

Map of Rahmanabad village

== Agriculture ==
Grape, barley, wheat, peas, lentil.

== Culture ==
=== Cultural and religious facilities ===
It has a primary school, an Abolfazl mosque and a comprehensive mosque.

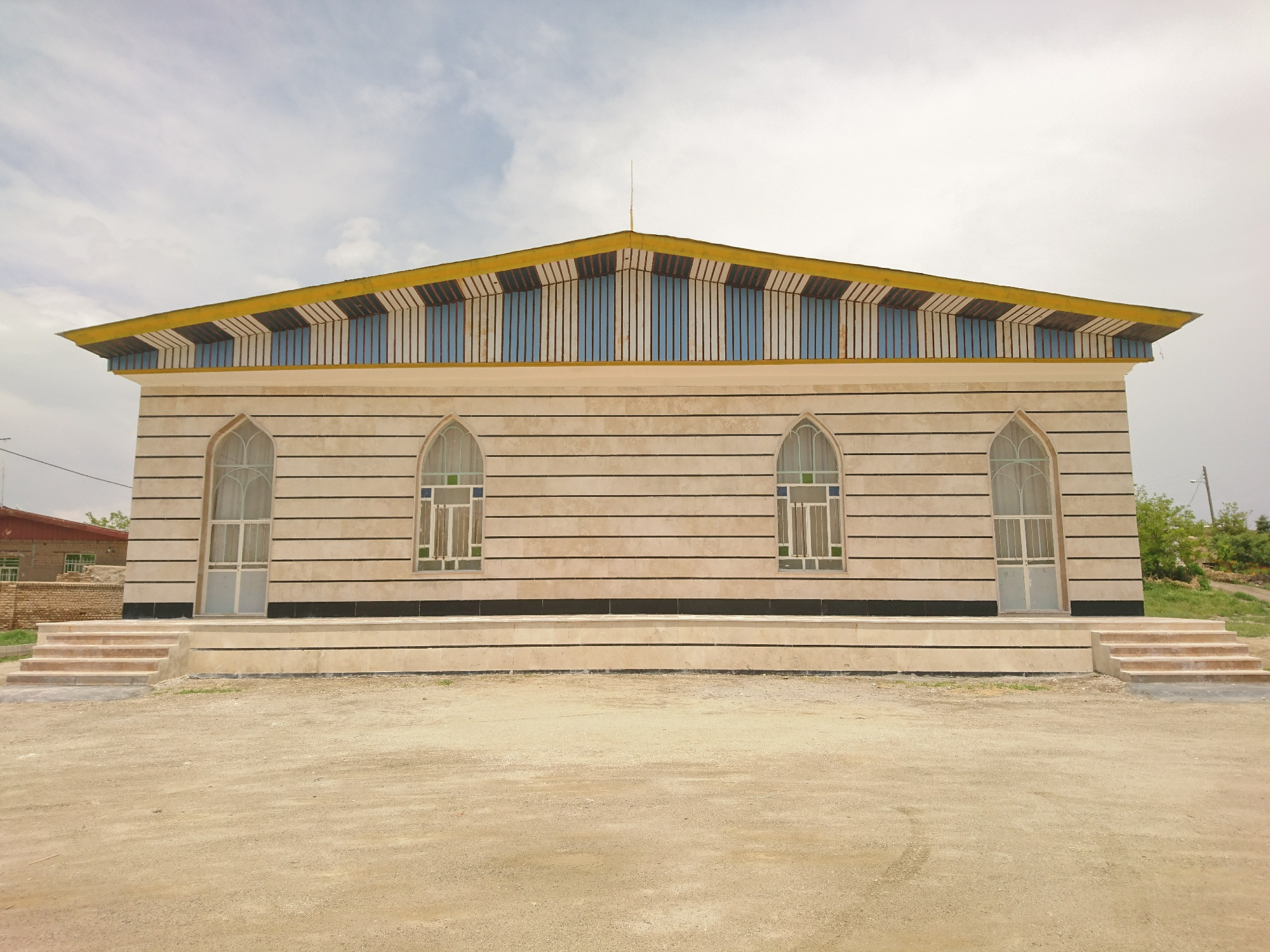
Abolfazl Mosque

=== Welfare Amenities ===
Gas, water, sanitary piping, electricity, telephone, and network coverage are included in the fiber optic path.

== Tourism ==
Its sights include old aqueducts and natural landscapes.

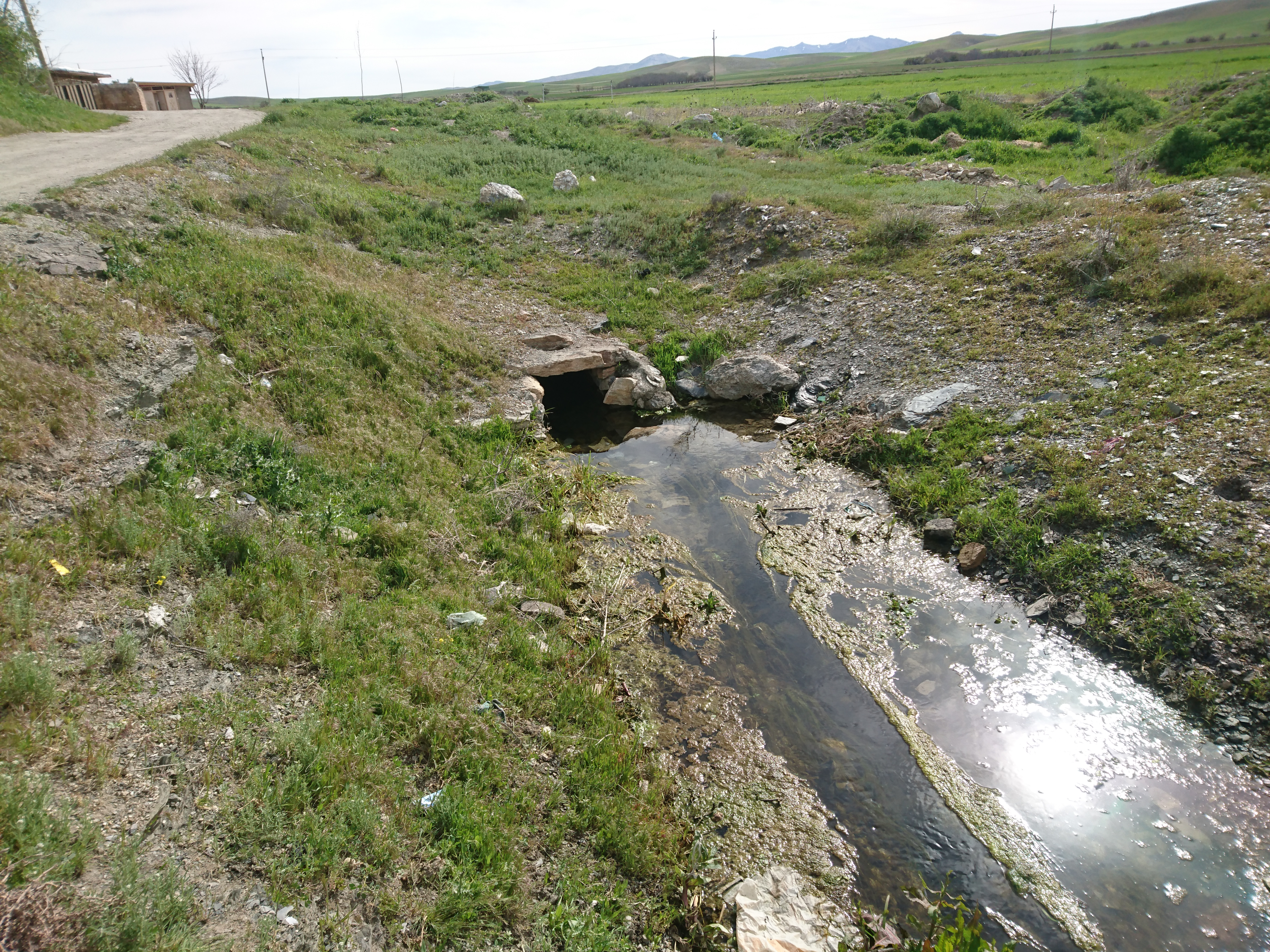
Old Rahmanabad-e Anuch aqueduct

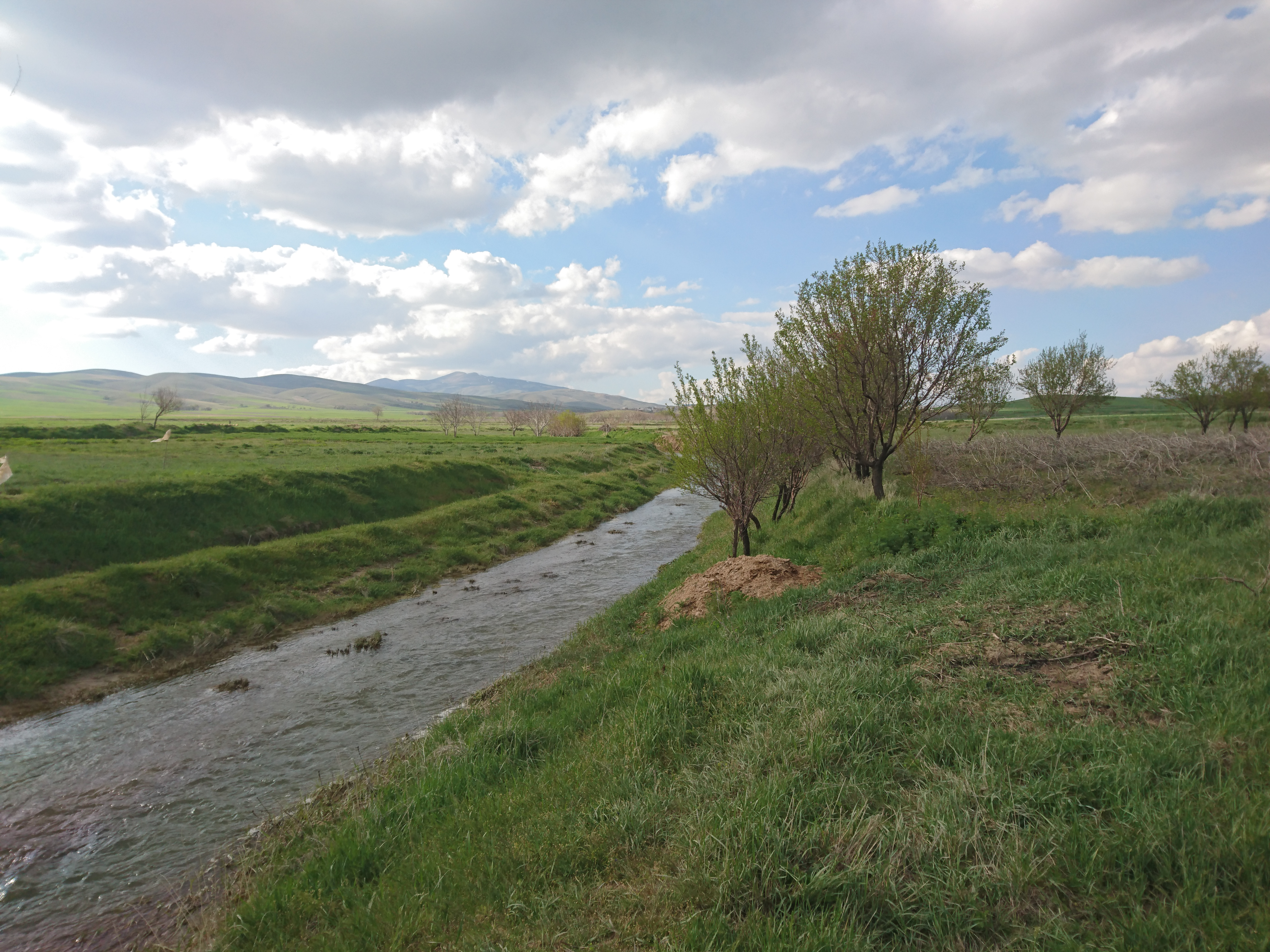
Landscape near Rahmanabad-e Anuch

=== Souvenirs ===
Grape juice, Raisin.
