= Malicheh =

Malicheh (Persian: ماليچه) may refer to:

- Malicheh, Fars
- Malicheh, Mamasani, Fars Province
- Malicheh, Malayer, Hamadan Province
- Malicheh, Tuyserkan, Hamadan Province
- Malicheh, Lorestan
