= Zarb =

Zarb may refer to: a common Maltese surname. Zarb is a Semitic name, and is phonetically similar to other names in Middle Eastern countries such as the Lebanese "Harb".

== Surname ==
- Frank Zarb (born 1935), American businessman and former Republican politician
- John Zarb, an Australian conscientious objector to military service during the Vietnam War
- Romilda Baldacchino Zarb, Maltese politician
- Tony Zarb, the secretary general of the Maltese General Workers' Union (GWU)

== Places ==
- Frank G. Zarb School of Business at Hofstra University
- Kalleh Zarb
- Zarb Ali

== Music ==
- Zarb, or tombak, a Persian percussion instrument.

== Military ==
- Operation Zarb-e-Azb, a military operation conducted by the Pakistani military
- Zarb (missile system), a Pakistani anti-ship cruise missile and coastal defence system
