= Belartu =

Village in Hamadan province, Iran

Belartu Persian: بلرتو
- Village
- Location within Iran
- Coordinates: 34°20′08″N 48°30′57″E
- Country: Iran
- Province: Hamadan
- County: Malayer
- District: Samen
- Rural District: Haram Rud-e Sofla

Population (2016)
  - Total: 360
- Time zone: UTC+3:30 (IRST)

Belartu (Persian: بلرتو) (Note: Also romanized as Belartū) is a village in Haram Rud-e Sofla Rural District of Samen District in Malayer County, Hamadan province, Iran.

== Demographics ==
=== Population ===
At the time of the 2006 National Census, the village's population was 434 in 101 households. The following census in 2011 counted 446 people in 107 households. The 2016 census measured the population of the village as 360 people in 113 households.
