= Anjireh, Hamadan =

Village in Hamadan province, Iran

Anjireh Persian: انجيره
- Village
- Location within Iran
- Coordinates: 34°12′54″N 48°31′38″E
- Country: Iran
- Province: Hamadan
- County: Malayer
- District: Samen
- Rural District: Sefidkuh

Population (2016)
  - Total: 163
- Time zone: UTC+3:30 (IRST)

Anjireh (Persian: انجيره) (Note: Also romanized as Anjīreh) is a village in Sefidkuh Rural District of Samen District in Malayer County, Hamadan province, Iran.

== Demographics ==
=== Population ===
At the time of the 2006 National Census, the village's population was 190 in 41 households. The following census in 2011 counted 196 people in 40 households. The 2016 census measured the population of the village as 163 people in 48 households.
