= Kartilabad =

Village in Hamadan province, Iran

Kartilabad Persian: كرتيل اباد
- Village
- Location within Iran
- Coordinates: 34°18′49″N 48°38′57″E
- Country: Iran
- Province: Hamadan
- County: Malayer
- District: Samen
- Rural District: Haram Rud-e Sofla

Population (2016)
  - Total: 858
- Time zone: UTC+3:30 (IRST)

Kartilabad (Persian: كرتيل اباد) (Note: Also romanized as Kartīlābād; also known as Katūl) is a village in Haram Rud-e Sofla Rural District of Samen District in Malayer County, Hamadan province, Iran.

== Demographics ==
=== Population ===
At the time of the 2006 National Census, the village's population was 1,020 in 275 households. The following census in 2011 counted 917 people in 291 households. The 2016 census measured the population of the village as 858 people in 282 households.
