= Avarzaman =

Village in Hamadan province, Iran

Avarzaman Persian: اورزمان
- Village
- Location within Iran
- Coordinates: 34°15′56″N 48°30′44″E
- Country: Iran
- Province: Hamadan
- County: Malayer
- District: Samen
- Rural District: Avarzaman

Population (2016)
  - Total: 1,621
- Time zone: UTC+3:30 (IRST)

Avarzaman (Persian: اورزمان) (Note: Also romanized as Āvarzamān; also known as Āb Zamām, Āb-ī-Zamān, Arūzamān, Āvar Zamān Tappeh Qayelī, and Avzamān) is a village in, and the capital of, Avarzaman Rural District in Samen District of Malayer County, Hamadan province, Iran.

== Demographics ==
=== Population ===
At the time of the 2006 National Census, the village's population was 1,881 in 550 households. The following census in 2011 counted 1,679 people in 553 households. The 2016 census measured the population of the village as 1,621 people in 563 households, the most populous in its rural district.
