= Cheshmeh Saran =

Cheshmeh Saran (Persian: چشمه‌ساران) may refer to:

- Cheshmeh Saran, Iran, in Hamadan Province
- Cheshmeh Saran District, in Golestan Province
- Cheshmeh Saran Rural District, in Golestan Province
