= Girya =

Girya may refer to:

- Kettlebell
- Olga Girya (born 1991), Russian chess player
- Girya, Iran, a village in Hamadan Province, Iran
