= Omara =

Omara or OMARA may refer to:

== People ==
- Omara Atubo, Ugandan politician
- Omara Durand, Cuban female paralympic
- Omara Khan Massoudi, Afghan museum director
- Omara Moctar, Niger guitarist, stage name Bombino
- Omara Portuondo, Cuban female singer

== Settlements ==
- Amir ol Omara, Pakistan
- Omaraj, Albania

== Organizations ==
- Haouch El-Omara, defunct Lebanese basketball team
- OMARA, Office of the Migration Agents Registration Authority (Australia)

== See also ==
- Betty Boniphace (Omara), Tanzanian beauty pageant
- O'Mara, a surname
