= Ordaklu =

Ordaklu (Persian: اردكلو) may refer to:

- Ordaklu, Armenia
- Ordaklu, East Azerbaijan, Iran
- Ordaklu, Hamadan, Iran
