= Mowdaran =

Village in Hamadan province, Iran

Mowdaran Persian: موداران
- Village
- Location within Iran
- Coordinates: 34°19′57″N 48°28′17″E
- Country: Iran
- Province: Hamadan
- County: Malayer
- District: Samen
- Rural District: Avarzaman

Population (2016)
  - Total: 206
- Time zone: UTC+3:30 (IRST)

Mowdaran (Persian: موداران) (Note: Also romanized as Mowdārān and Mūdārān; formerly known as Mey Khvārān (میخواران), also romanized as Meykhwrān) is a village in Avarzaman Rural District of Samen District in Malayer County, Hamadan province, Iran.

== Demographics ==
=== Population ===
At the time of the 2006 National Census, the village's population was 205 in 49 households. The following census in 2011 counted 230 people in 61 households. The 2016 census measured the population of the village as 206 people in 62 households.
