= Hoseynabad-e Nazem =

Village in Hamadan province, Iran

Hoseynabad-e Nazem Persian: حسين اباد ناظم
- Village
- Location within Iran
- Coordinates: 34°17′48″N 48°36′17″E
- Country: Iran
- Province: Hamadan
- County: Malayer
- District: Samen
- Rural District: Haram Rud-e Sofla

Population (2016)
  - Total: 3,271
- Time zone: UTC+3:30 (IRST)

Hoseynabad-e Nazem (Persian: حسين اباد ناظم) (Note: Also romanized as Hoseīn Abad Nazem and Ḩoseynābād-e Nāz̧em; also known as Ḩoseynābād and Hūsaīnābād) is a village in, and the capital of, Haram Rud-e Sofla Rural District in Samen District of Malayer County, Hamadan province, Iran.

== Demographics ==
=== Population ===
At the time of the 2006 National Census, the village's population was 3,326 in 869 households. The following census in 2011 counted 3,335 people in 1,037 households. The 2016 census measured the population of the village as 3,271 people in 1,055 households, the most populous in its rural district.
