= Dehnow-e Avarzaman =

Village in Hamadan province, Iran

Dehnow-e Avarzaman Persian: ده نواورزمان
- Village
- Location within Iran
- Coordinates: 34°18′24″N 48°33′22″E
- Country: Iran
- Province: Hamadan
- County: Malayer
- District: Samen
- Rural District: Haram Rud-e Sofla

Population (2016)
  - Total: 1,698
- Time zone: UTC+3:30 (IRST)

Dehnow-e Avarzaman (Persian: ده نواورزمان) (Note: Also romanized as Dehnow-e Āvarzamān and Deh Now-ye Āvar Zamān; also known as Deh Now) is a village in Haram Rud-e Sofla Rural District of Samen District in Malayer County, Hamadan province, Iran.

== Demographics ==
=== Population ===
At the time of the 2006 National Census, the village's population was 1,609 in 446 households. The following census in 2011 counted 1,531 people in 480 households. The 2016 census measured the population of the village as 1,698 people in 527 households.
