= Eskanan =

Village in Hamadan province, Iran

Eskanan Persian: اسكنان
- Village
- Location within Iran
- Coordinates: 34°21′29″N 48°35′34″E
- Country: Iran
- Province: Hamadan
- County: Malayer
- District: Samen
- Rural District: Haram Rud-e Sofla

Population (2016)
  - Total: 500
- Time zone: UTC+3:30 (IRST)

Eskanan (Persian: اسكنان) (Note: Also romanized as Eskanān, Eskenān, Eskonān, and Iskenān; also known as Asgān, Eshkenān, and Eskān) is a village in Haram Rud-e Sofla Rural District of Samen District in Malayer County, Hamadan province, Iran.

== Demographics ==
=== Population ===
At the time of the 2006 National Census, the village's population was 453 in 97 households. The following census in 2011 counted 535 people in 141 households. The 2016 census measured the population of the village as 500 people in 150 households.
