= Mehdiabad, Malayer =

Village in Hamadan province, Iran

Mehdiabad Persian: مهدي اباد
- Village
- Location within Iran
- Coordinates: 34°16′17″N 48°33′03″E
- Country: Iran
- Province: Hamadan
- County: Malayer
- District: Samen
- Rural District: Avarzaman

Population (2016)
  - Total: 193
- Time zone: UTC+3:30 (IRST)

Mehdiabad (Persian: مهدي اباد) (Note: Also romanized as Mahdīābād and Mehdīābād) is a village in Avarzaman Rural District of Samen District in Malayer County, Hamadan province, Iran.

== Demographics ==
=== Population ===
At the time of the 2006 National Census, the village's population was 182 in 54 households. The following census in 2011 counted 183 people in 65 households. The 2016 census measured the population of the village as 193 people in 68 households.
