= Darreh-ye Omid Ali =

Village in Hamadan province, Iran

Darreh-ye Omid Ali Persian: دره اميدعلي
- Village
- Location within Iran
- Coordinates: 34°19′20″N 48°25′46″E
- Country: Iran
- Province: Hamadan
- County: Malayer
- District: Samen
- Rural District: Avarzaman

Population (2016)
  - Total: 323
- Time zone: UTC+3:30 (IRST)

Darreh-ye Omid Ali (Persian: دره اميدعلي) (Note: Also romanized as Darreh Omīd 'Alī and Darreh-ye Omīd 'Alī; also known as Darreh Omīn 'Alī) is a village in Avarzaman Rural District of Samen District in Malayer County, Hamadan province, Iran.

== Demographics ==
=== Population ===
At the time of the 2006 National Census, the village's population was 308 in 70 households. The following census in 2011 counted 335 people in 87 households. The 2016 census measured the population of the village as 323 people in 96 households.
