= Abdar, Hamadan =

Village in Hamadan province, Iran

Abdar Persian: ابدر
- Village
- Location within Iran
- Coordinates: 34°15′40″N 48°28′44″E
- Country: Iran
- Province: Hamadan
- County: Malayer
- District: Samen
- Rural District: Avarzaman

Population (2016)
  - Total: 639
- Time zone: UTC+3:30 (IRST)

Abdar (Persian: ابدر) (Note: Also romanized as Ābdar) is a village in Avarzaman Rural District of Samen District in Malayer County, Hamadan province, Iran.

== Demographics ==
=== Population ===
At the time of the 2006 National Census, the village's population was 815 in 202 households. The following census in 2011 counted 753 people in 226 households. The 2016 census measured the population of the village as 639 people in 218 households.
