= Yunos =

Yunos may refer to:

- Afiq Yunos (born 1990), Singaporean footballer
- Ismail Yunos (born 1986), Singaporean footballer
- Yunos, Iran, a village in Hamadan Province, Iran
- Yun OS, a Android-based operating system
