= Durijan =

Village in Hamadan province, Iran

Durijan Persian: دوريجان
- Village
- Location within Iran
- Coordinates: 34°18′20″N 48°29′23″E
- Country: Iran
- Province: Hamadan
- County: Malayer
- District: Samen
- Rural District: Avarzaman

Population (2016)
  - Total: 371
- Time zone: UTC+3:30 (IRST)

Durijan (Persian: دوريجان) (Note: Also romanized as Dūrījān) is a village in Avarzaman Rural District of Samen District in Malayer County, Hamadan province, Iran.

== Demographics ==
=== Population ===
At the time of the 2006 National Census, the village's population was 371 in 82 households. The following census in 2011 counted 338 people in 88 households. The 2016 census measured the population of the village as 371 people in 82 households.
