= Nazmul =

Nazmul is a given name. Notable people with the name include:

- Nazmul Huda Bachchu (1938–2017), Bangladeshi film and television actor
- Syed Nazmul Haque, (1941–1971), martyred Bengali Journalist
- Mohammad Nazmul Hossain (born 1987), Bangladeshi cricketer
- Nazmul Huda, Bangladeshi lawyer and politician
- Nazmul Huq (1938–1971), first sector commander of the 7th sector in the Bangladesh Liberation War
- Nazmul Hussain (born 1948), Indian first-class cricketer who represented Rajasthan
- Nazmul Islam (born 1991), Bangladeshi cricketer
- A.K. Nazmul Karim (1922–1982), sociologist from Bangladesh
- Nazmul Hossain Milon (born 1987), Bangladeshi cricketer
- Nazmul Hassan Papon (born 1961), president of Bangladesh Cricket Board, Member of Parliament
- Nazmul Hoque Sarkar, Lawyer, politician, martyr
- Nazmul Hossain Shanto (born 1998), Bangladeshi cricketer

== See also ==
- Nazul
