= Vashan, Hamadan =

Village in Hamadan province, Iran

Vashan Persian: واشان
- Village
- Location within Iran
- Coordinates: 34°05′49″N 48°42′21″E
- Country: Iran
- Province: Hamadan
- County: Malayer
- District: Samen
- Rural District: Samen

Population (2016)
  - Total: 840
- Time zone: UTC+3:30 (IRST)

Vashan (Persian: واشان) (Note: Also romanized as Vāshān) is a village in Samen Rural District of Samen District in Malayer County, Hamadan province, Iran.

== Demographics ==
=== Population ===
At the time of the 2006 National Census, the village's population was 1,433 in 294 households. The following census in 2011 counted 1,194 people in 338 households. The 2016 census measured the population of the village as 840 people in 244 households.
