= Kalilabad =

Village in Hamadan province, Iran

Kalilabad Persian: كليل اباد
- Village
- Location within Iran
- Coordinates: 34°20′21″N 48°32′42″E
- Country: Iran
- Province: Hamadan
- County: Malayer
- District: Samen
- Rural District: Haram Rud-e Sofla

Population (2016)
  - Total: 491
- Time zone: UTC+3:30 (IRST)

Kalilabad (Persian: كليل اباد) (Note: Also romanized as Kalīlābād) is a village in Haram Rud-e Sofla Rural District of Samen District in Malayer County, Hamadan province, Iran.

== Demographics ==
=== Population ===
At the time of the 2006 National Census, the village's population was 543 in 141 households. The following census in 2011 counted 561 people in 161 households. The 2016 census measured the population of the village as 491 people in 153 households.
