= Zagheh-ye Anuch =

Village in Hamadan province, Iran

Zagheh-ye Anuch Persian: زاغه انوچ
- Village
- Location within Iran
- Coordinates: 34°08′52″N 48°33′15″E
- Country: Iran
- Province: Hamadan
- County: Malayer
- District: Samen
- Rural District: Sefidkuh

Population (2016)
  - Total: 84
- Time zone: UTC+3:30 (IRST)

Zagheh-ye Anuch (Persian: زاغه انوچ) (Note: Also romanized as Zāgheh Anūch and Zāgheh-ye Anūch; also known as Zāgheh-ye Anūj) is a village in Sefidkuh Rural District of Samen District in Malayer County, Hamadan province, Iran.

== Demographics ==
=== Population ===
At the time of the 2006 National Census, the village's population was 125 in 39 households. The following census in 2011 counted 114 people in 39 households. The 2016 census measured the population of the village as 84 people in 33 households.
