= Tajar-e Samen =

Village in Hamadan province, Iran

Tajar-e Samen Persian: طجرسامن
- Village
- Location within Iran
- Coordinates: 34°13′32″N 48°39′54″E
- Country: Iran
- Province: Hamadan
- County: Malayer
- District: Samen
- Rural District: Samen

Population (2016)
  - Total: 568
- Time zone: UTC+3:30 (IRST)

Tajar-e Samen (Persian: طجرسامن) (Note: Also romanized as Ţajar-e Sāmen; also known as Tajar) is a village in Samen Rural District of Samen District in Malayer County, Hamadan province, Iran.

== Demographics ==
=== Population ===
At the time of the 2006 National Census, the village's population was 944 in 235 households. The following census in 2011 counted 883 people in 255 households. The 2016 census measured the population of the village as 568 people in 193 households.
