= Luluhar =

Village in Hamadan province, Iran

Luluhar Persian: لولوهر
- Village
- Location within Iran
- Coordinates: 34°18′57″N 48°27′14″E
- Country: Iran
- Province: Hamadan
- County: Malayer
- District: Samen
- Rural District: Avarzaman

Population (2016)
  - Total: 839
- Time zone: UTC+3:30 (IRST)

Luluhar (Persian: لولوهر) (Note: Also romanized as Lūlūhar) is a village in Avarzaman Rural District of Samen District in Malayer County, Hamadan province, Iran.

== Demographics ==
=== Population ===
At the time of the 2006 National Census, the village's population was 780 in 195 households. The following census in 2011 counted 861 people in 250 households. The 2016 census measured the population of the village as 839 people in 249 households.
