= Malicheh, Malayer =

Malicheh ماليچه
- Village
- Location within Iran
- Coordinates: 34°15′39″N 48°35′29″E
- Country: Iran
- Province: Hamadan
- County: Malayer
- Bakhsh: Samen
- Rural District: Haram Rud-e Sofla

Population (2006)
  - Total: 98
- Time zone: UTC+3:30 (IRST)
  - Summer (DST): UTC+4:30 (IRDT)

Malicheh (Persian: ماليچه, also Romanized as Mālīcheh; also known as Mālīcheh Sāmen) is a village in Haram Rud-e Sofla Rural District, Samen District, Malayer County, Hamadan Province, Iran. At the 2006 census, its population was 98, in 29 families.
