= Mianzulan =

Village in Hamadan province, Iran

Mianzulan Persian: ميانزولان
- Village
- Location within Iran
- Coordinates: 34°18′44″N 48°30′56″E
- Country: Iran
- Province: Hamadan
- County: Malayer
- District: Samen
- Rural District: Avarzaman

Population (2016)
  - Total: 179
- Time zone: UTC+3:30 (IRST)

Mianzulan (Persian: ميانزولان) (Note: Also romanized as Mīān Zūlan and Mīānzūlān; also known as Mūzelān) is a village in Avarzaman Rural District of Samen District in Malayer County, Hamadan province, Iran.

== Demographics ==
=== Population ===
At the time of the 2006 National Census, the village's population was 188 in 51 households. The following census in 2011 counted 152 people in 46 households. The 2016 census measured the population of the village as 179 people in 53 households.
