= Amir ol Omara =

Amir ol Omara اميرالامرا
- Village
- Location within Iran
- Coordinates: 34°11′46″N 48°40′12″E
- Country: Iran
- Province: Hamadan
- County: Malayer
- Bakhsh: Samen
- Rural District: Samen

Population (2006)
  - Total: 191
- Time zone: UTC+3:30 (IRST)
  - Summer (DST): UTC+4:30 (IRDT)

Amir ol Omara (Persian: اميرالامرا, also romanized as Amīr ol Omarā’ and Amīral Omarā; also known as Amīr ol Amar) is a village in Samen Rural District, Samen District, Malayer County, Hamadan Province, Iran. At the 2006 census, its population was 191, in 64 families.
