= Kahriz-e Hoseynabad-e Nazem =

Village in Hamadan province, Iran

Kahriz-e Hoseynabad-e Nazem Persian: كهريزحسين ابادناظم
- Village
- Location within Iran
- Coordinates: 34°19′04″N 48°37′40″E
- Country: Iran
- Province: Hamadan
- County: Malayer
- District: Samen
- Rural District: Haram Rud-e Sofla

Population (2016)
  - Total: 448
- Time zone: UTC+3:30 (IRST)

Kahriz-e Hoseynabad-e Nazem (Persian: كهريزحسين ابادناظم) (Note: Also romanized as Kahrīz-e Ḩoseynābād-e Nāz̧em; also known as Kahrīz and Kahrīz Ḩoseynābād) is a village in Haram Rud-e Sofla Rural District of Samen District in Malayer County, Hamadan province, Iran.

== Demographics ==
=== Population ===
At the time of the 2006 National Census, the village's population was 494 in 123 households. The following census in 2011 counted 477 people in 156 households. The 2016 census measured the population of the village as 448 people in 158 households.
