= Dehlaq, Malayer =

Village in Hamadan province, Iran

Dehlaq Persian: دهلق
- Village
- Location within Iran
- Coordinates: 34°17′58″N 48°26′04″E
- Country: Iran
- Province: Hamadan
- County: Malayer
- District: Samen
- Rural District: Avarzaman

Population (2016)
  - Total: 1,152
- Time zone: UTC+3:30 (IRST)

Dehlaq (Persian: دهلق) (Note: Also known as Degla and Degleh) is a village in Avarzaman Rural District of Samen District in Malayer County, Hamadan province, Iran.

== Demographics ==
=== Population ===
At the time of the 2006 National Census, the village's population was 1,586 in 365 households. The following census in 2011 counted 1,420 people in 401 households. The 2016 census measured the population of the village as 1,152 people in 373 households.
