= Qeshlaq-e Anuch =

Village in Hamadan province, Iran

Qeshlaq-ye Anuch Persian: قشلاق انوچ
- Village
- Location within Iran
- Coordinates: 34°06′59″N 48°34′40″E
- Country: Iran
- Province: Hamadan
- County: Malayer
- District: Samen
- Rural District: Sefidkuh

Population (2016)
  - Total: 247
- Time zone: UTC+3:30 (IRST)

Qeshlaq-e Anuch (Persian: قشلاق انوچ) (Note: Also romanized as Qeshlāq-e Anūch; also known as Armanābād, Qeshlāq-e Anūj, and Qeshlāq-e Anūjs) is a village in Sefidkuh Rural District of Samen District in Malayer County, Hamadan province, Iran.

== Demographics ==
=== Population ===
At the time of the 2006 National Census, the village's population was 277 in 77 households. The following census in 2011 counted 280 people in 89 households. The 2016 census measured the population of the village as 247 people in 81 households.
