= Ordaklu, Hamadan =

Ordaklu اردكلو
- Village
- Location within Iran
- Coordinates: 34°07′38″N 48°48′25″E
- Country: Iran
- Province: Hamadan
- County: Malayer
- Bakhsh: Samen
- Rural District: Samen

Population (2006)
  - Total: 50
- Time zone: UTC+3:30 (IRST)
  - Summer (DST): UTC+4:30 (IRDT)

Ordaklu (Persian: اردكلو, also Romanized as Ordaklū; also known as Urdaklu) is a village in Samen Rural District, Samen District, Malayer County, Hamadan Province, Iran. At the 2006 census, its population was 50, in 22 families.
