= Ali Morad Khvah =

Village in Hamadan province, Iran

Ali Morad Khvah Persian: علي مرادخواه
- Village
- Location within Iran
- Coordinates: 34°11′52″N 48°33′09″E
- Country: Iran
- Province: Hamadan
- County: Malayer
- District: Samen
- Rural District: Sefidkuh

Population (2016)
  - Total: 404
- Time zone: UTC+3:30 (IRST)

Ali Morad Khvah (Persian: علي مرادخواه) (Note: Also romanized as ‘Alī Morād Khvāh; formerly known as Qaleh-ye Ali Morada (قلعه علیمردا); also known as Qal‘eh ‘Alī Morād, Qal‘eh-ye ‘Alī Morād, and Qal‘eh-ye ‘Alī Morād Khān) is a village in Sefidkuh Rural District of Samen District in Malayer County, Hamadan province, Iran.

== Demographics ==
=== Population ===
At the time of the 2006 National Census, the village's population was 495 in 123 households. The following census in 2011 counted 402 people in 115 households. The 2016 census measured the population of the village as 404 people in 117 households.
