= Bahareh, Hamadan =

Village in Hamadan province, Iran

Bahareh Persian: بهاره
- Village
- Location within Iran
- Coordinates: 34°11′50″N 48°32′47″E
- Country: Iran
- Province: Hamadan
- County: Malayer
- District: Samen
- Rural District: Sefidkuh

Population (2016)
  - Total: 1,360
- Time zone: UTC+3:30 (IRST)

Bahareh (Persian: بهاره) (Note: Also romanized as Bahāreh; formerly known as Solţānābād (سلطان‌آباد); also known as Solţānābād-e Anūch, Solţānābād-e Anūj, and Sultānābād) is a village in Sefidkuh Rural District of Samen District in Malayer County, Hamadan province, Iran.

== Demographics ==
=== Population ===
At the time of the 2006 National Census, the village's population was 1,481 in 377 households. The following census in 2011 counted 1,302 people in 397 households. The 2016 census measured the population of the village as 1,360 people in 400 households.
