= Jaria =

Village in Hamadan province, Iran

Jaria Persian: جريا
- Village
- Location within Iran
- Coordinates: 34°21′07″N 48°28′25″E
- Country: Iran
- Province: Hamadan
- County: Malayer
- District: Samen
- Rural District: Avarzaman

Population (2016)
  - Total: 222
- Time zone: UTC+3:30 (IRST)

Jaria (Persian: جريا) (Note: Also romanized as Jarīā, Jereyā, and Jeryā; also known as Girieh, Girya, and Gīryeh) is a village in Avarzaman Rural District of Samen District in Malayer County, Hamadan province, Iran.

== Demographics ==
=== Population ===
At the time of the 2006 National Census, the village's population was 228 in 57 households, when it was in Haram Rud-e Sofla Rural District. The following census in 2011 counted 227 people in 59 households, by which time the village had been transferred to Avarzaman Rural District. The 2016 census measured the population of the village as 222 people in 63 households.
