= Abbasabad, Malayer =

Village in Hamadan province, Iran

Abbasabad Persian: عباس اباد
- Village
- Location within Iran
- Coordinates: 34°15′02″N 48°32′49″E
- Country: Iran
- Province: Hamadan
- County: Malayer
- District: Samen
- Rural District: Avarzaman

Population (2016)
  - Total: 12
- Time zone: UTC+3:30 (IRST)

Abbasabad (Persian: عباس اباد) (Note: Also romanized as ‘Abbāsābād) is a village in Avarzaman Rural District of Samen District in Malayer County, Hamadan province, Iran.

== Demographics ==
=== Population ===
At the time of the 2006 National Census, the village's population was 21 in five households. The following census in 2011 counted a population below the reporting threshold. The 2016 census measured the population of the village as 12 people in six households.
