= Kahkadan =

Village in Hamadan province, Iran

Kahkadan Persian: كهكدان
- Village
- Location within Iran
- Coordinates: 34°08′38″N 48°39′30″E
- Country: Iran
- Province: Hamadan
- County: Malayer
- District: Samen
- Rural District: Samen

Population (2016)
  - Total: 2,230
- Time zone: UTC+3:30 (IRST)

Kahkadan (Persian: كهكدان) (Note: Also romanized as Kahkadān) is a village in, and the capital of, Samen Rural District in Samen District of Malayer County, Hamadan province, Iran.

== Demographics ==
=== Population ===
At the time of the 2006 National Census, the village's population was 2,382 in 611 households. The following census in 2011 counted 2,503 people in 724 households. The 2016 census measured the population of the village as 2,230 people in 684 households, the most populous in its rural district.
