= Kalleshvara Temple, Bagali =

Kalleshwara Temple
- Village
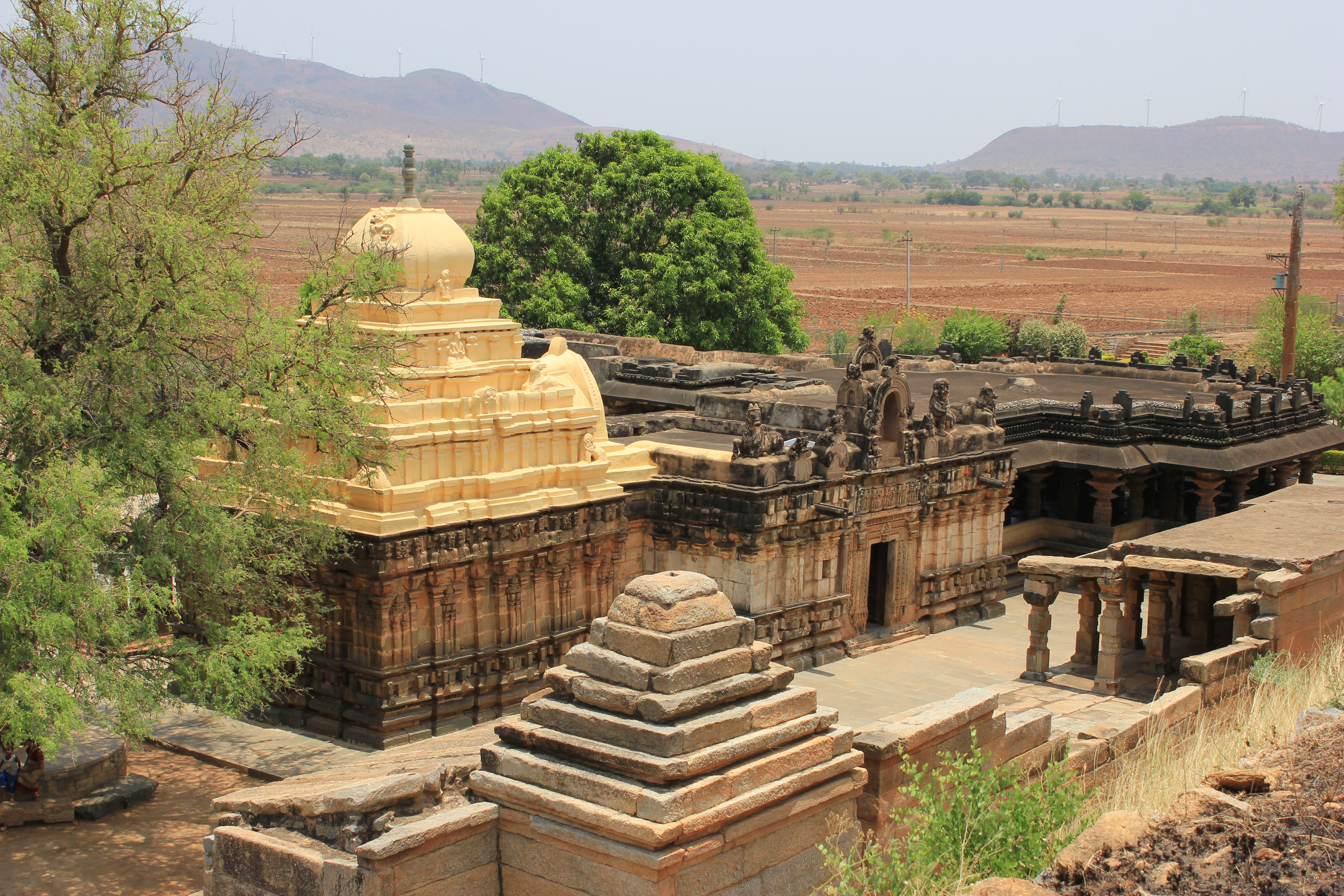
- Kalleshvara temple (987 CE) at Bagali in Vijayanagara district

- Location within Karnataka
- Coordinates: 14°50′38″N 75°58′58″E
- Country: India
- State: Karnataka
- District: Vijaynagara
- Taluk: Harpanahalli
- Lok Sabha Constituency: Harapanahalli

Languages
  - Official: Kannada
- Time zone: UTC+5:30 (IST)
- Vehicle registration: KA-35

Kalleshwara Temple (also spelled Kallesvara or Kalleshwara) is a temple located in the village of Bagali (called Balgali in ancient inscriptions). It is 9 km away from Harpanahalli in the Vijayanagara district of Karnataka state, India.

== Construction ==
The construction of the temple spans the rule of two Kannada dynasties: the Rashtrakuta Dynasty during the mid-10th century, and the Western Chalukya Empire, during the reign of founding King Tailapa II (also called Ahava Malla) around 987 CE. (the dynasty is also called Later or Kalyani Chalukya). The consecration of the temple was done by an individual called Duggimayya. Art historian Adam Hardy classifies the architectural style of the temple as "Late Rashtrakuta vimana (shrine and tower) with erotic carvings, and a closed mantapa (hall), fronted by a Later Chalukya non-mainstream open mantapa, the building material for which is soapstone". The existing tower over the shrine may be a later day re-construction. The temple, whose premises have yielded thirty-six old Kannada inscriptions (danashasana, lit, describing donations) from the 10th and 11th centuries, is protected as a monument of national importance by the Archaeological Survey of India.

== Temple plan and decoration ==
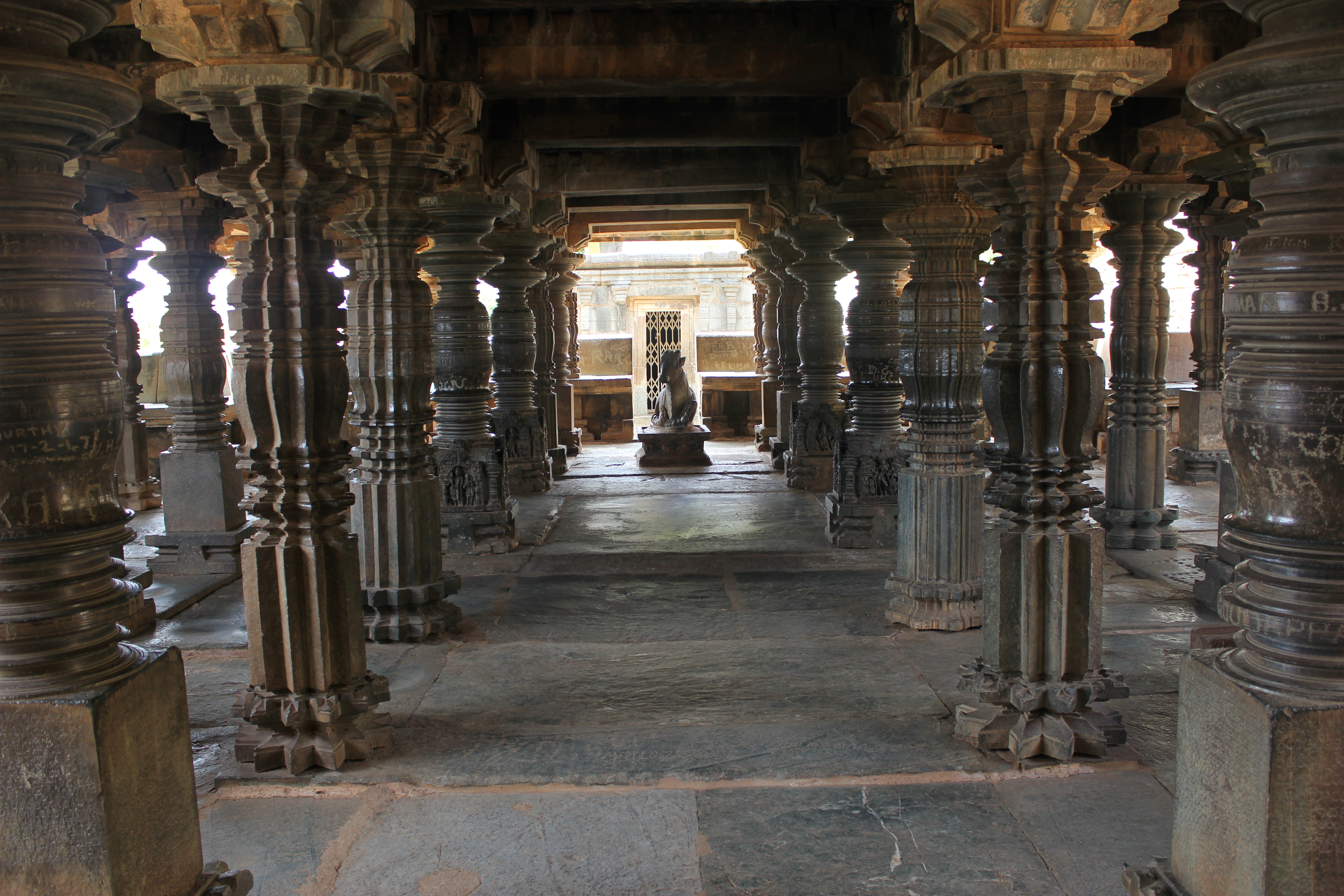
A view of the ornate open hall facing the Nandi (bull) in the east in Kalleshvara temple at Bagali

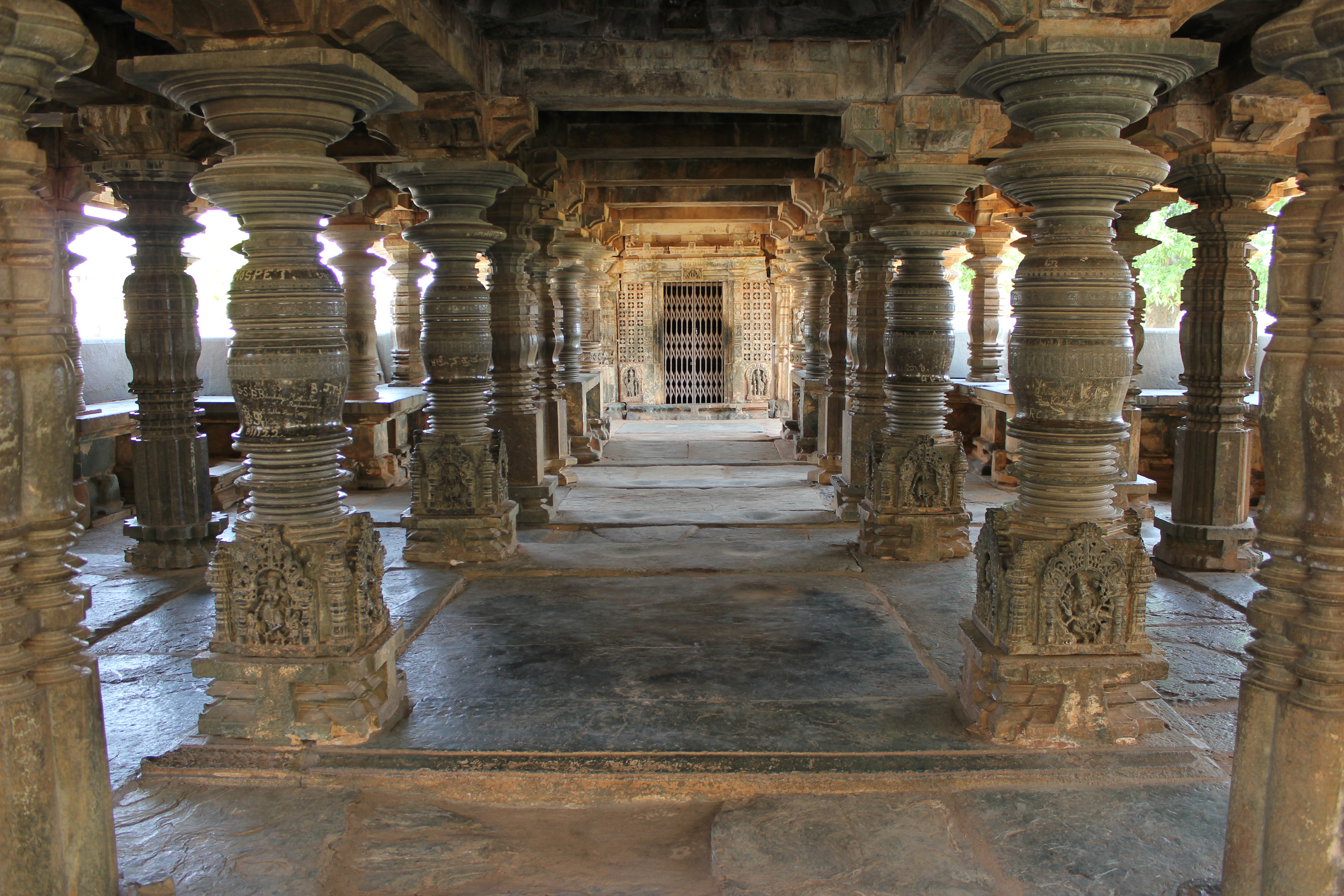
View of mantapa facing a minor shrine in the Kalleshvara Temple at Bagali

The temple plan comprises a main shrine for the Hindu god Shiva with a sanctum (cella or garbhagriha) facing east, a vestibule (antechamber or antarala), a main closed hall (mahamantapa) with an entrance in the south and east. These structures are attributed to the 10th-century Rashtrakuta rule. The closed hall is preceded by a large, open gathering hall (sabhamandapa) with fifty highly ornate lathe turned pillars that support a decorative ceiling. Also provided are a shrine for the Sun god Surya with a hall (mukhamandapa) facing the east-west orientation, and a small shrine for the deity Narasimha (a form of the Hindu god Vishnu) in the north of the gathering hall. These constructions are ascribed to the Western Chalukya rule. In all, there are eight small shrines built around the main shrine. Of the fifty pillars, twenty four pillars are located over the platform (jagati) provided with a balcony seating (kakshasana). The door ways (doorjamb and lintel) of the eastern doorway that faces the Nandi (bull, a companion of the Hindu god Shiva), and the southern doorway that forms an entry into the close hall are intricately decorated. A few independent sculptures from the late Chalukyan period are found in the closed hall. These include Shiva, Umamahesvara (Shiva with his consort Parvati), Ganesha, Kartikeya, Surya, Anantasayana (the god Vishnu seated on a snake), Sarasvati and Mahishamardini (a form of the goddess Durga).

== See also ==
- Kalleshwara Temple, Hire Hadagali
- Kalleshvara Temple, Ambali

== Notes ==
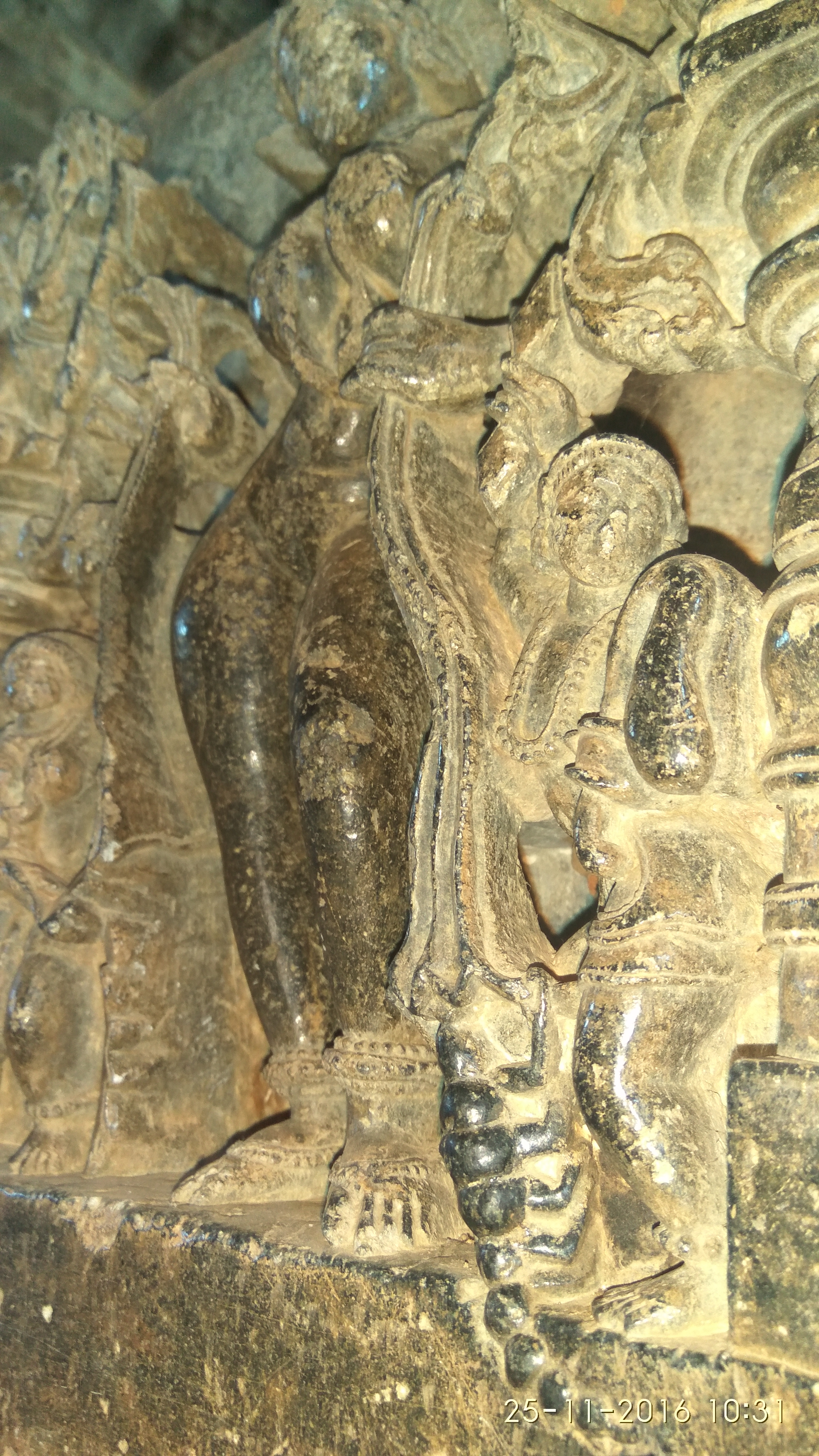
Relief of Chelu Sundari curved on the pillar base in the Kalleshvara temple at Bagali

== Gallery ==
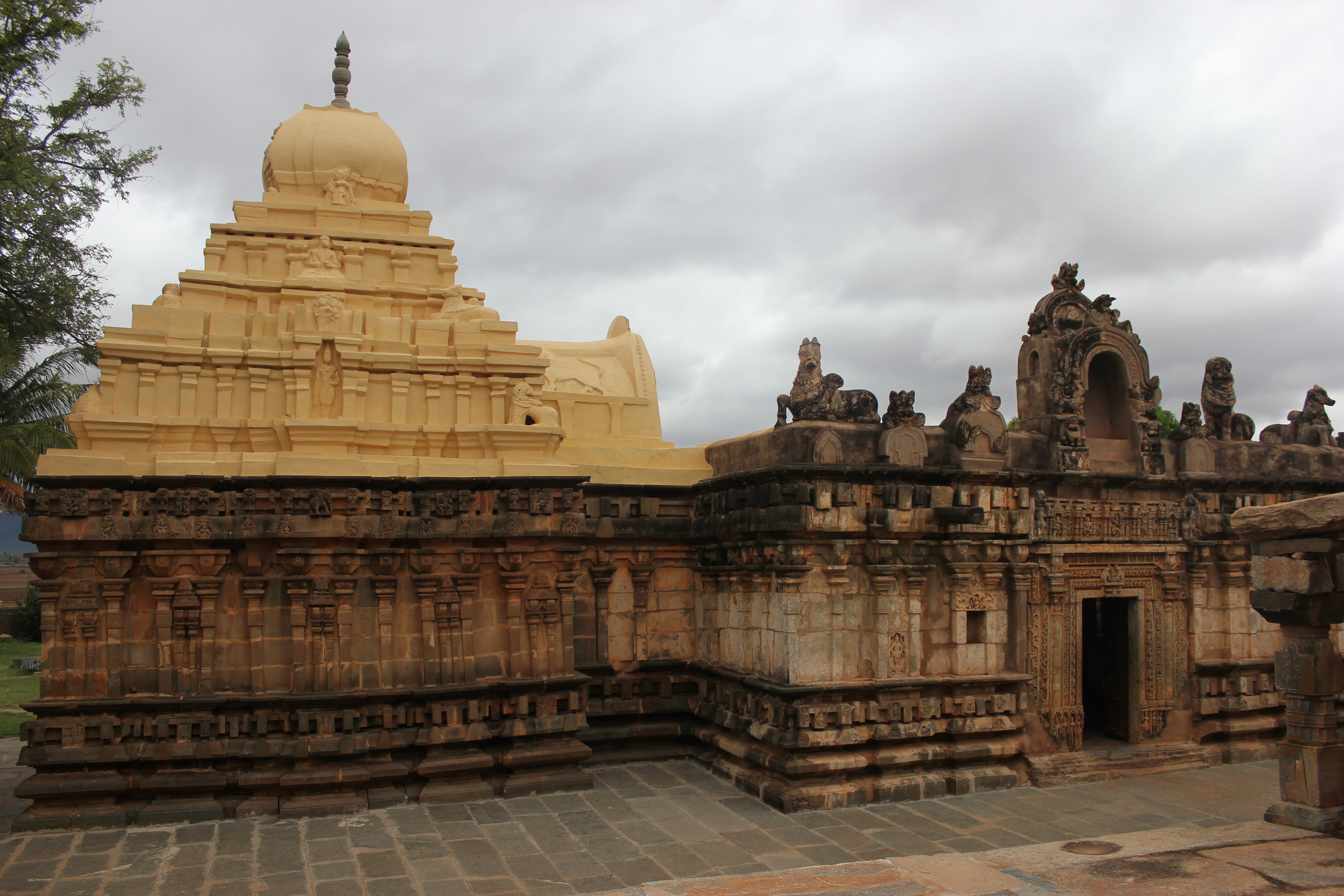
Close up of shrine and closed mantapa outer wall at Kalleshvara temple at Bagali

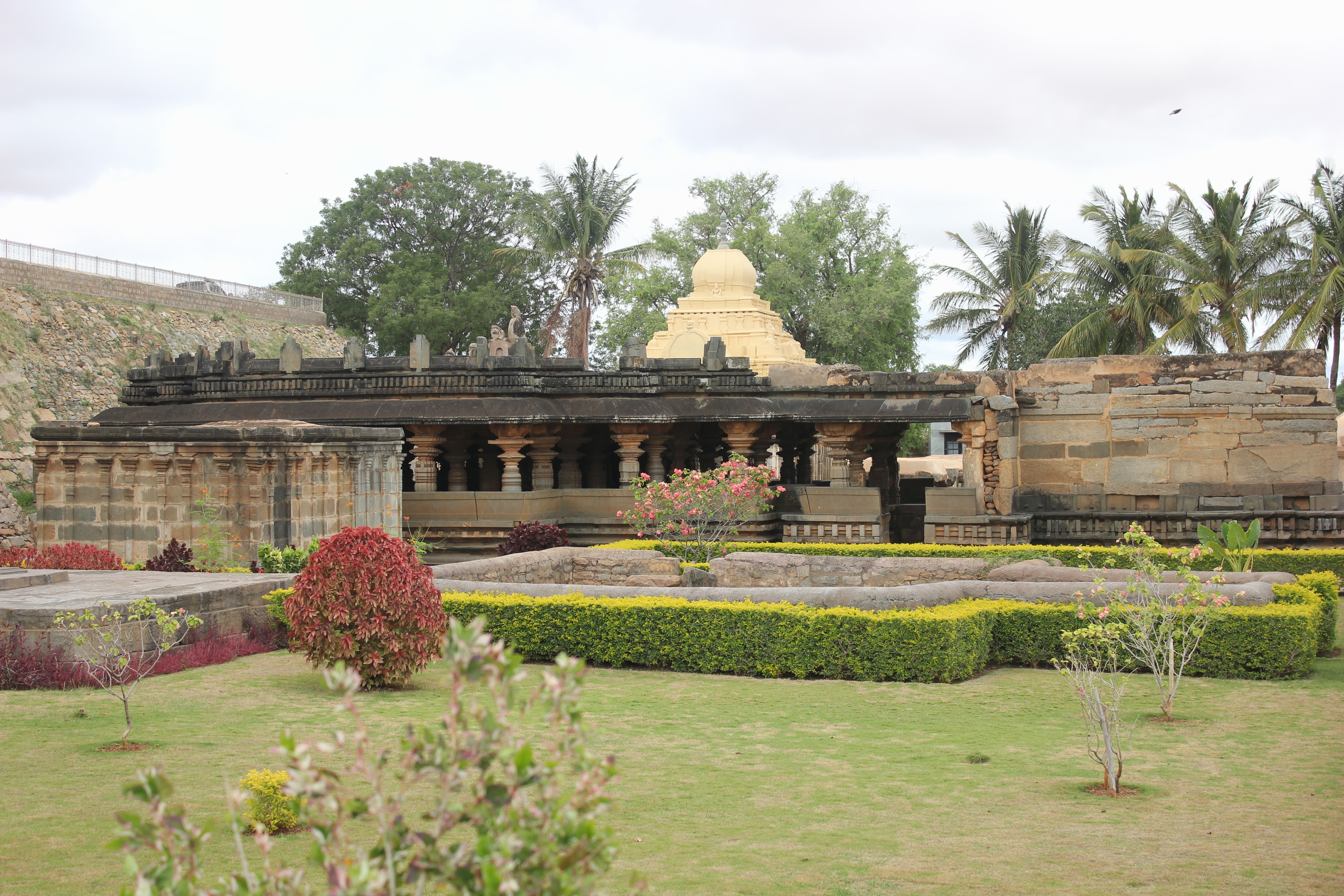
A view from a distance of the Kalleshvara temple at Bagali

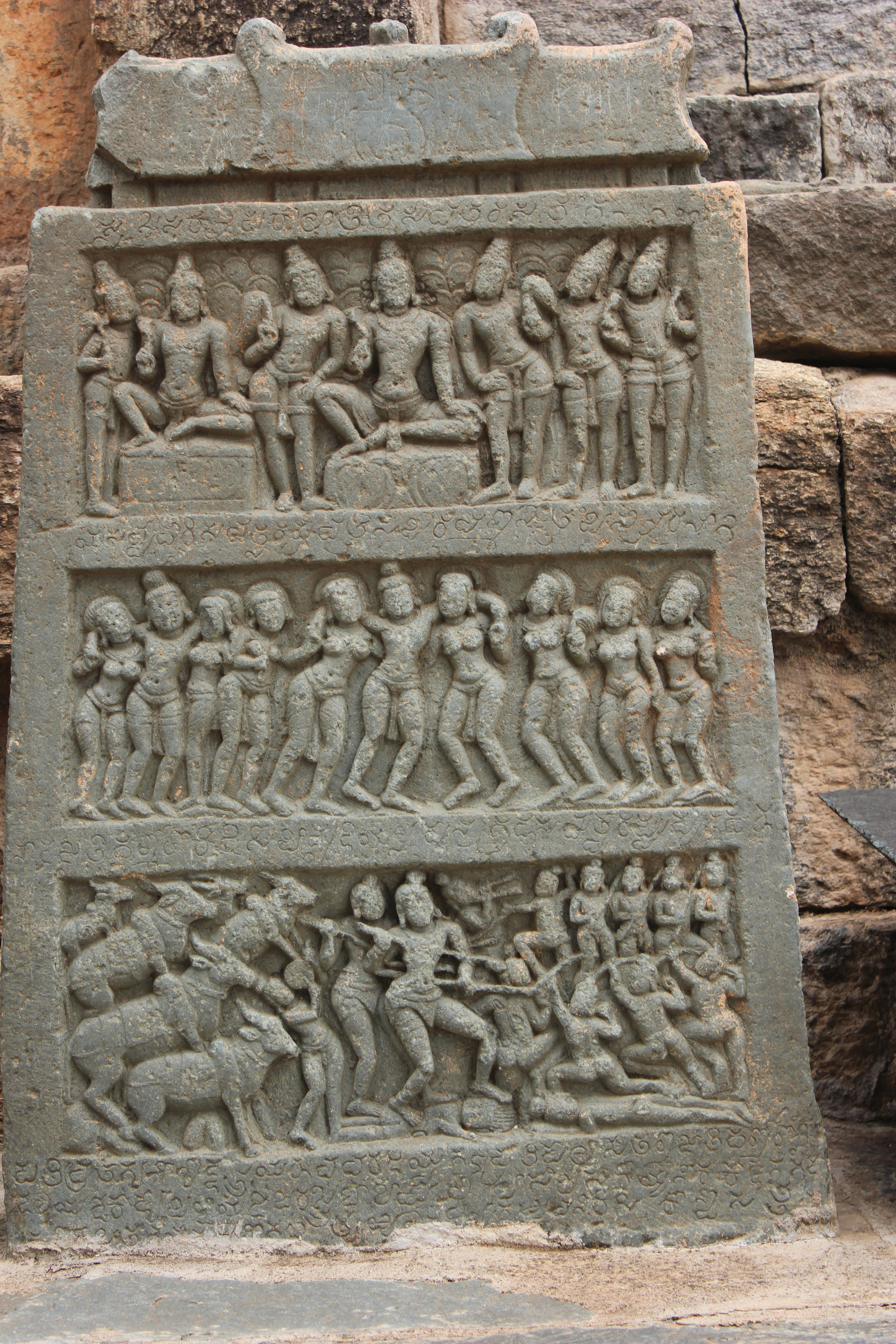
Hero stone with late 10th - 11th century old Kannada inscription depicts a battle with cattle thieves in Kalleshvara temple at Bagali

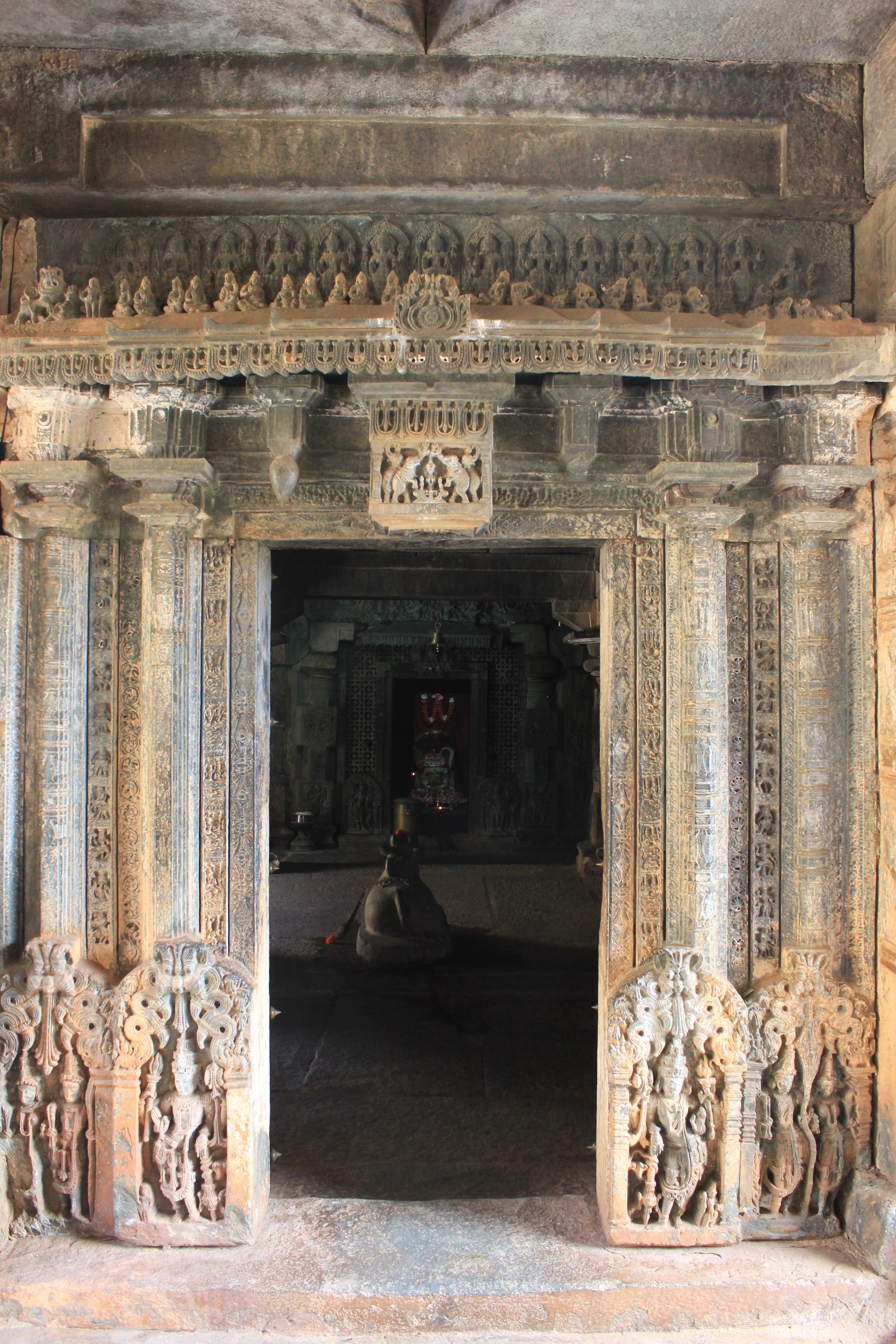
Ornate eastern doorway to the closed hall (mahaamantapa) from the open hall (sabhamantapa)

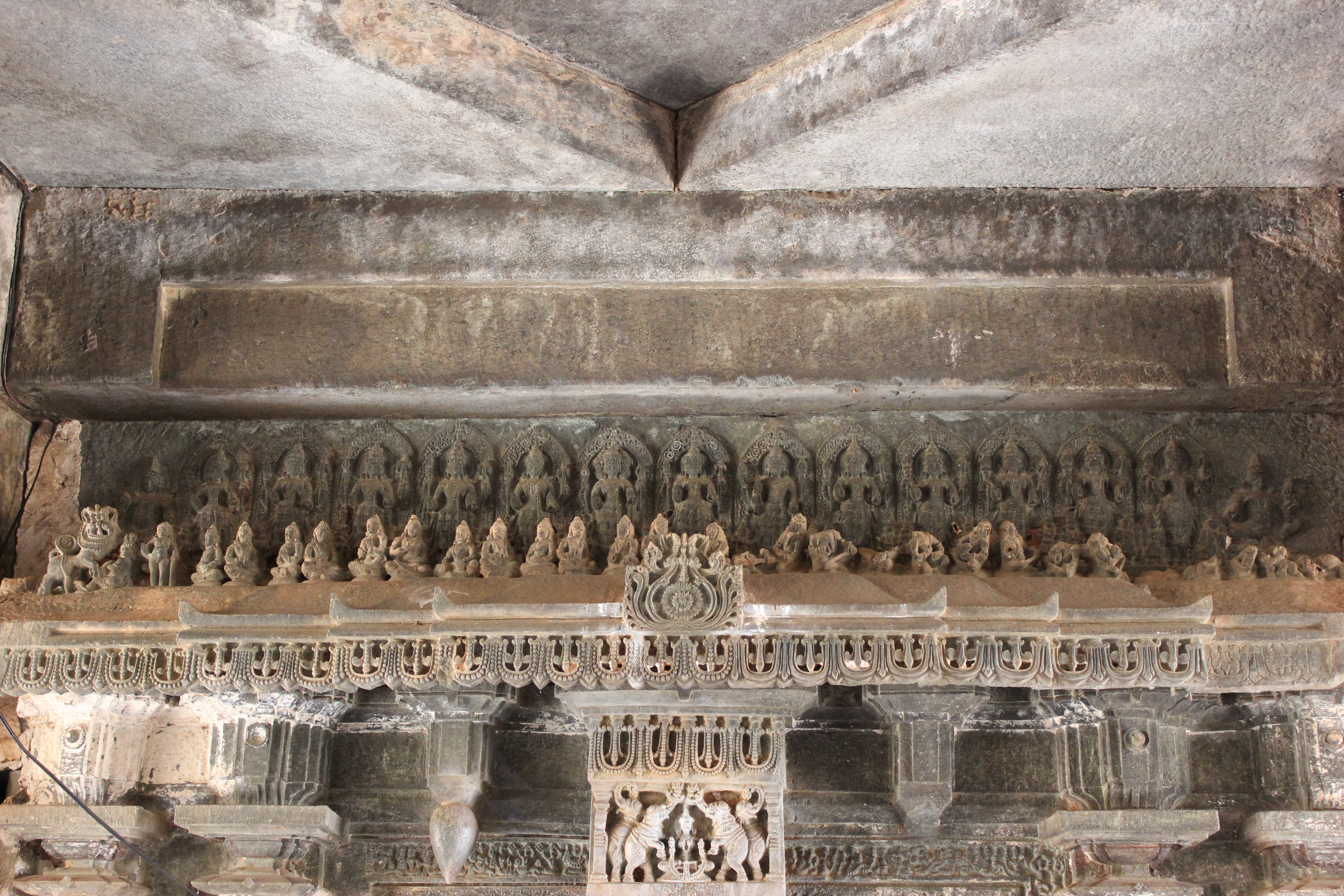
Close up of linel over mantapa entrance of Kalleshvara Temple at Bagali

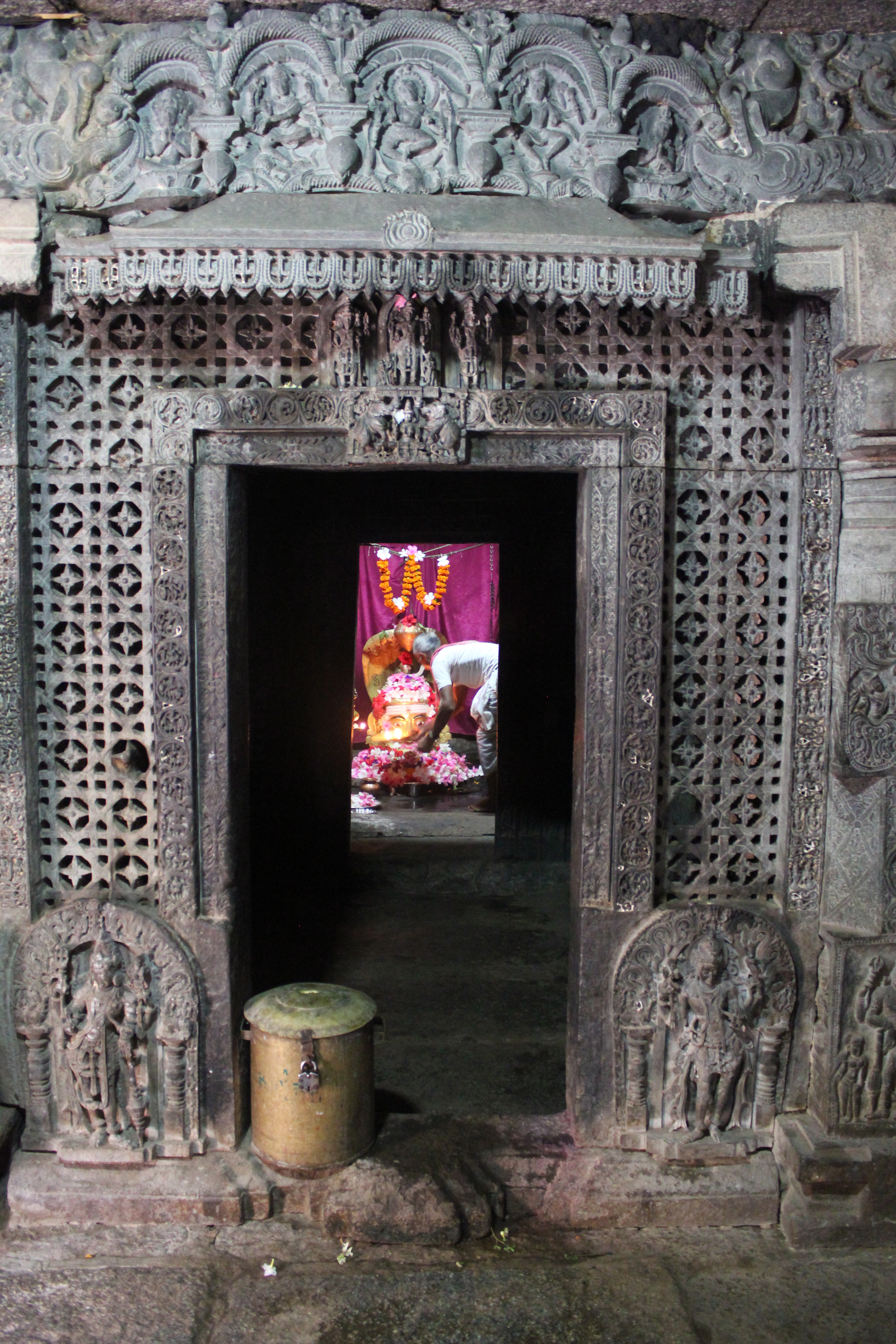
Ornate eastern doorway entrance to the vestibule and sanctum in Kalleshvara temple at Bagali

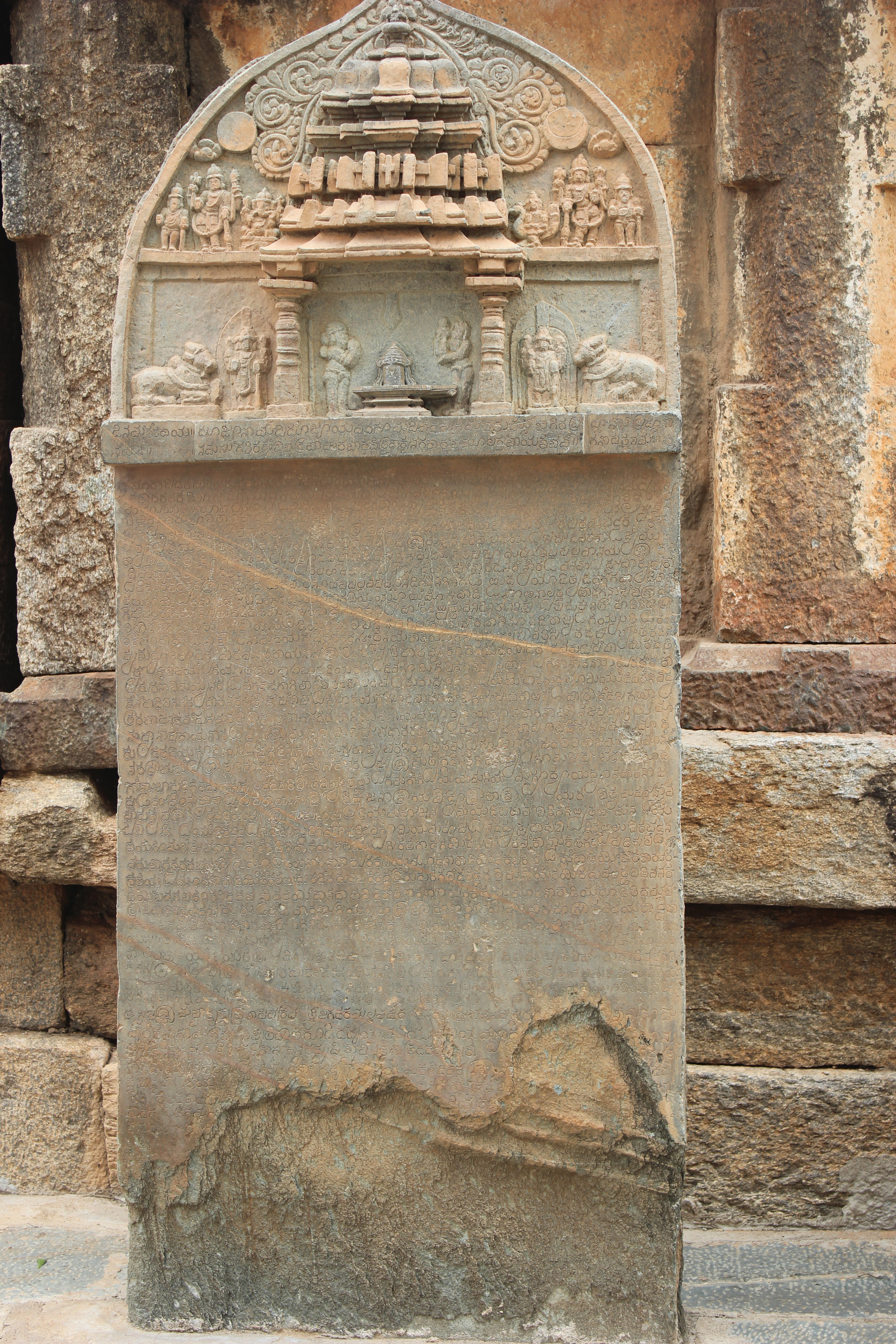
An Old Kannada inscription from the late 10th - 11th century A.D. in Kalleshvara temple at Bagali

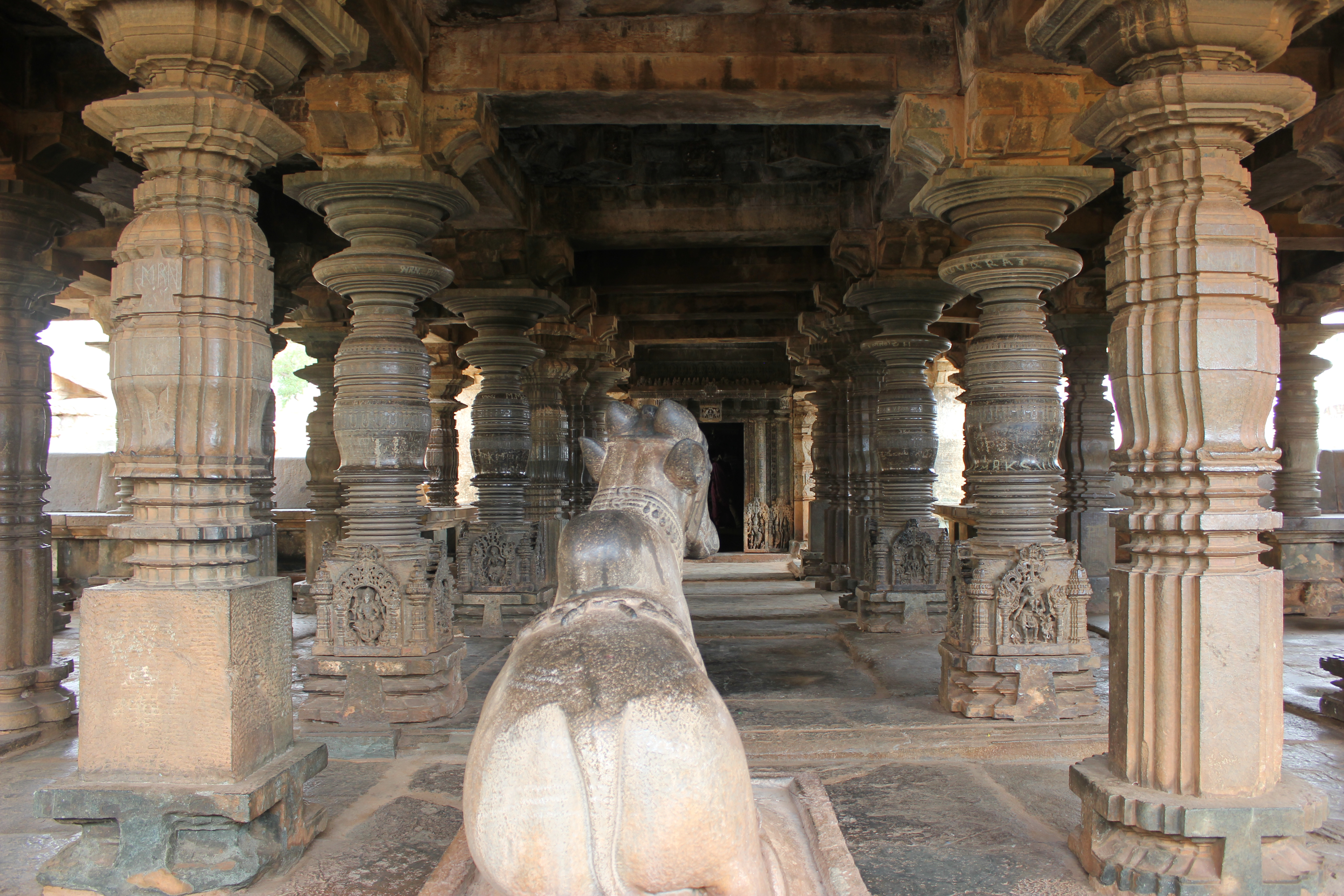
A view of the open hall looking into the eastern doorway to the close hall

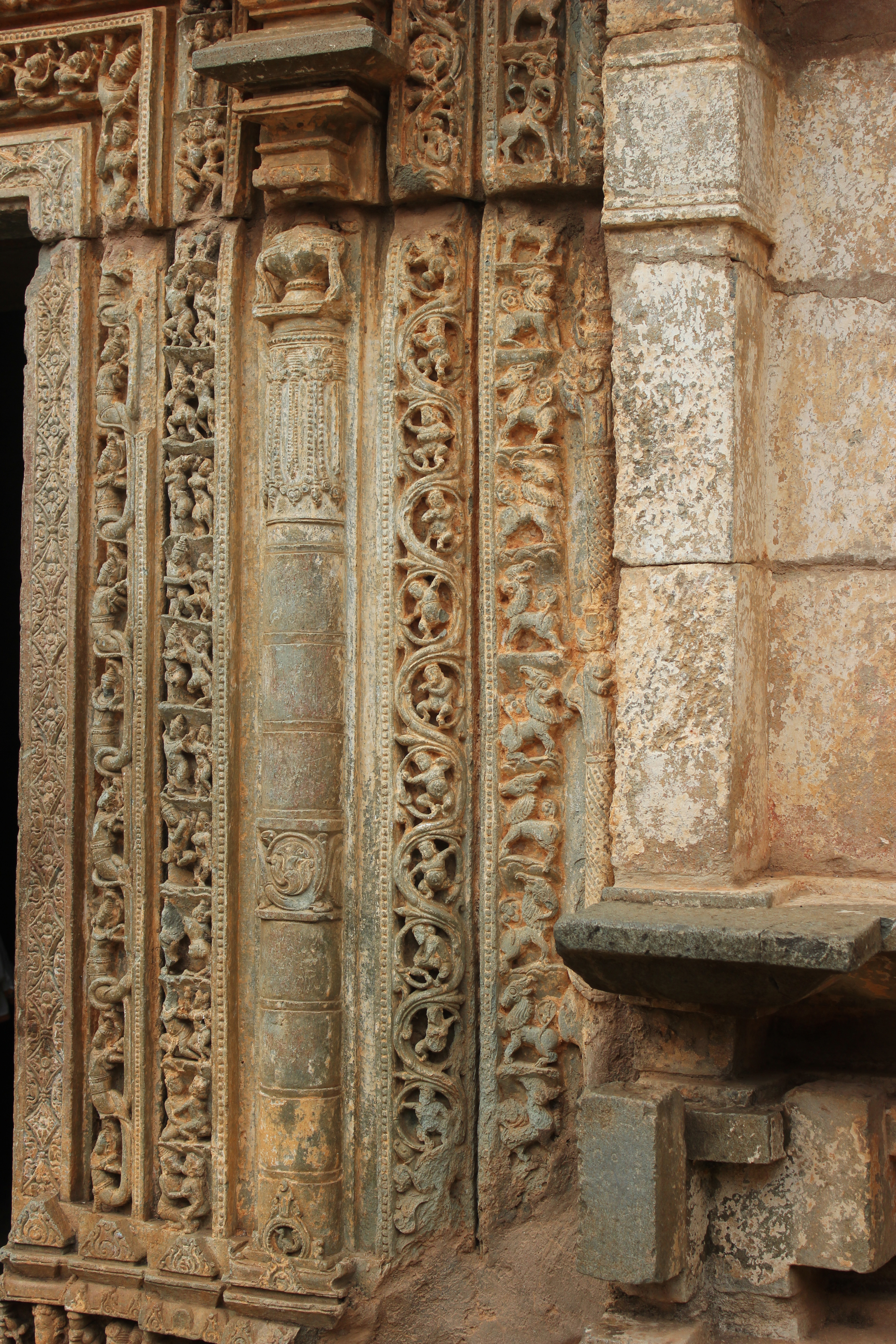
Ornate doorjamb in Kalleshvara temple at Bagali

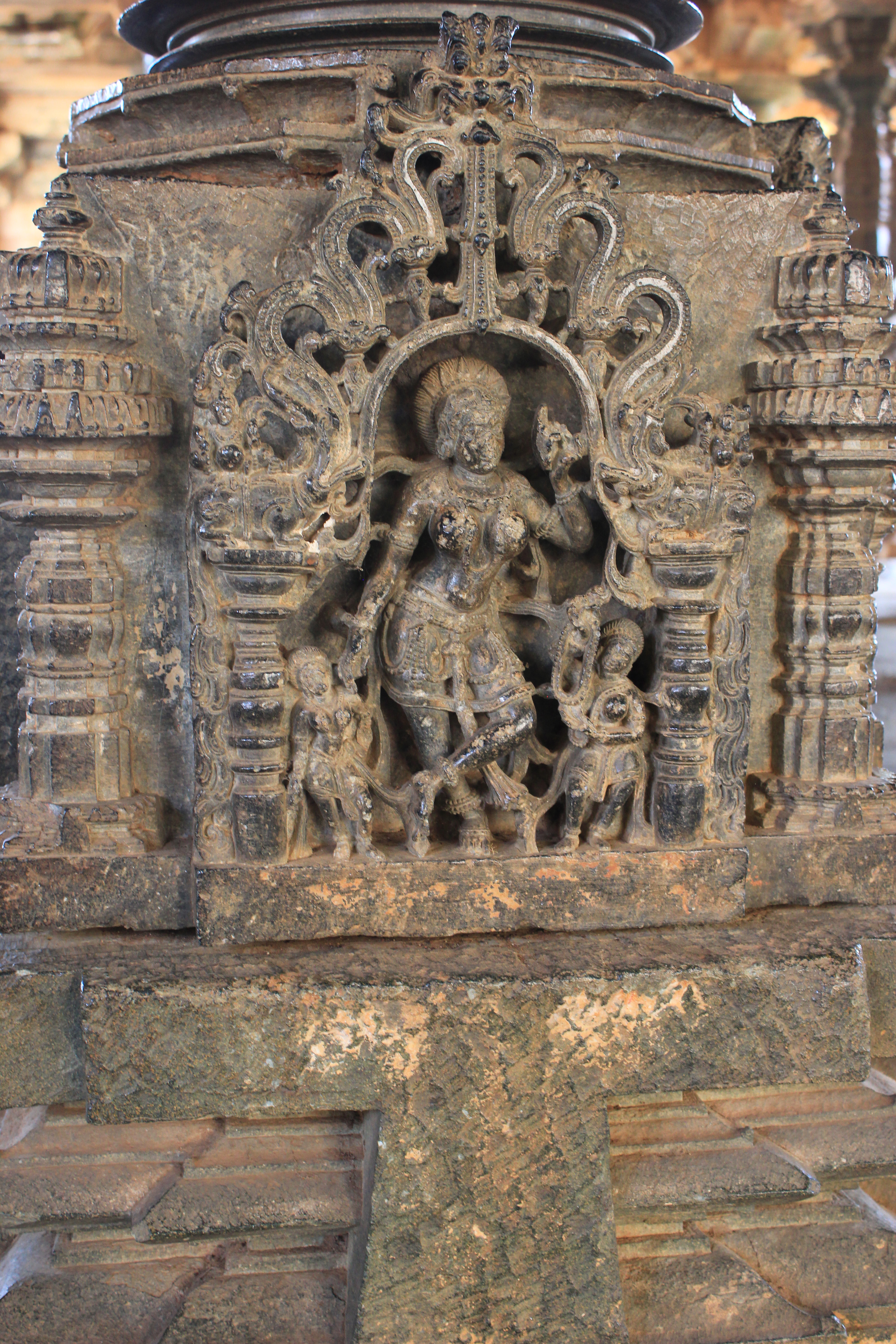
Pillar pedestal relief in the open hall in Kalleshvara temple at Bagali

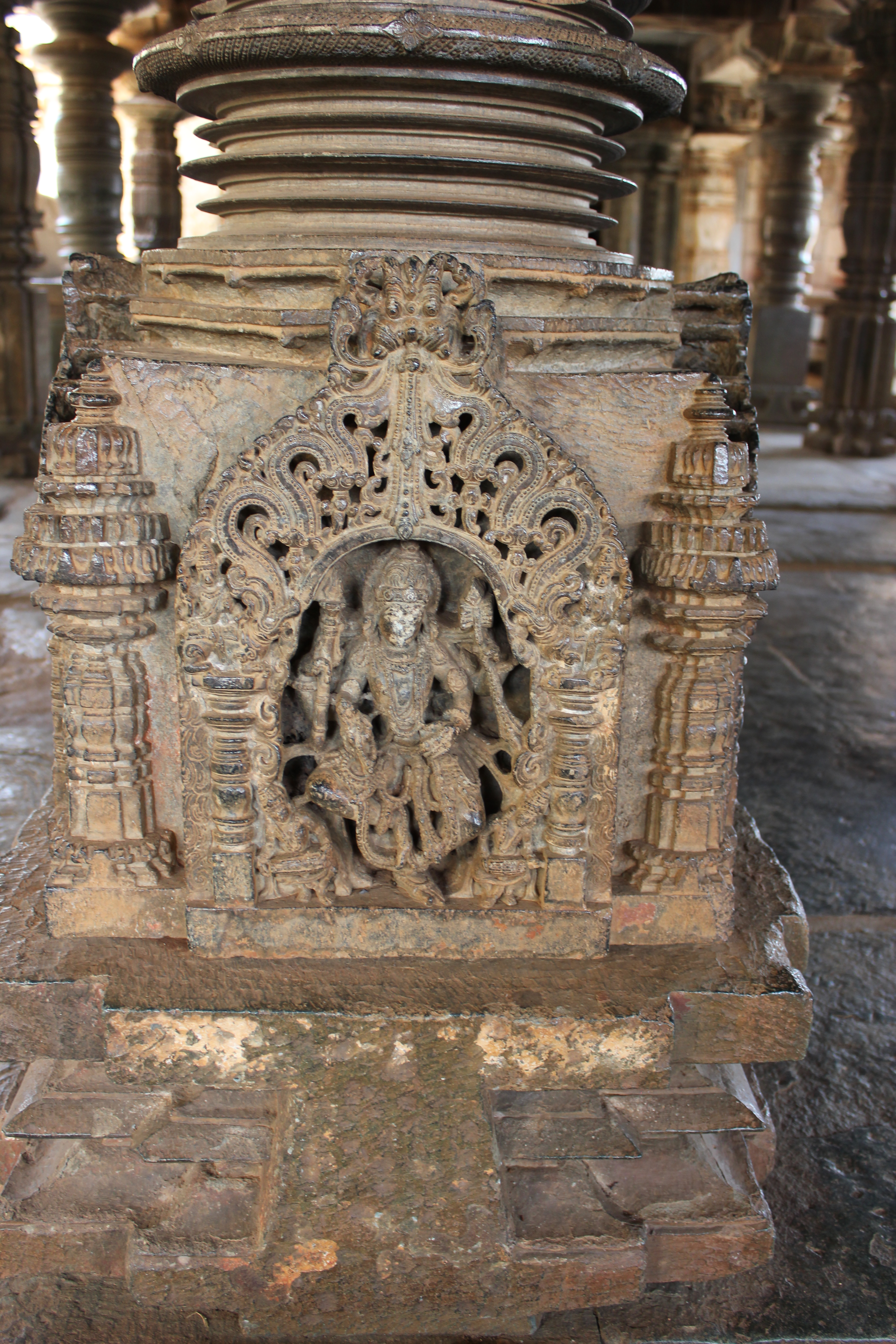
Pillar pedestal relief in the open hall in Kalleshvara temple at Bagali

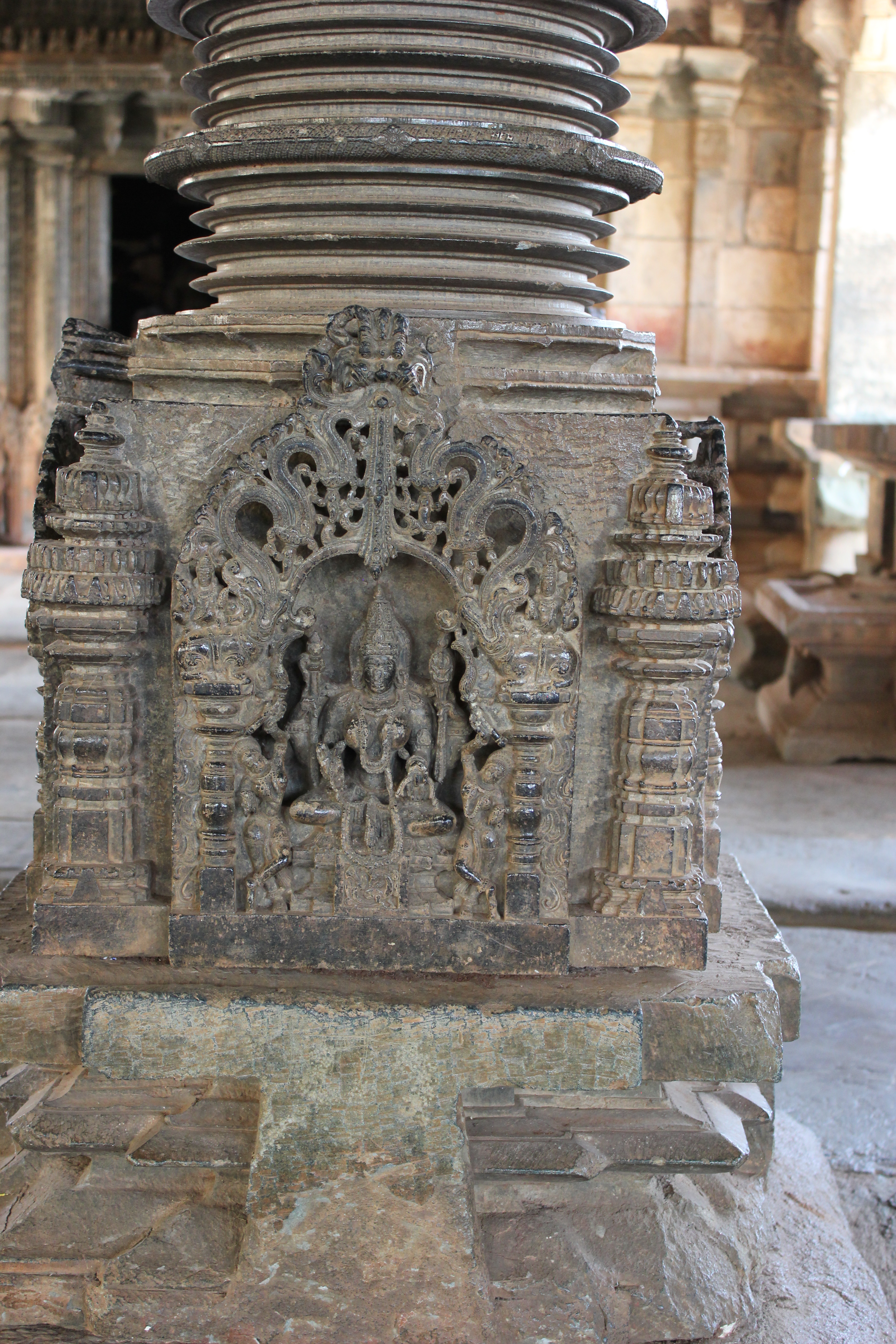
Pillar pedestal relief in the open hall in Kalleshvara temple at Bagali

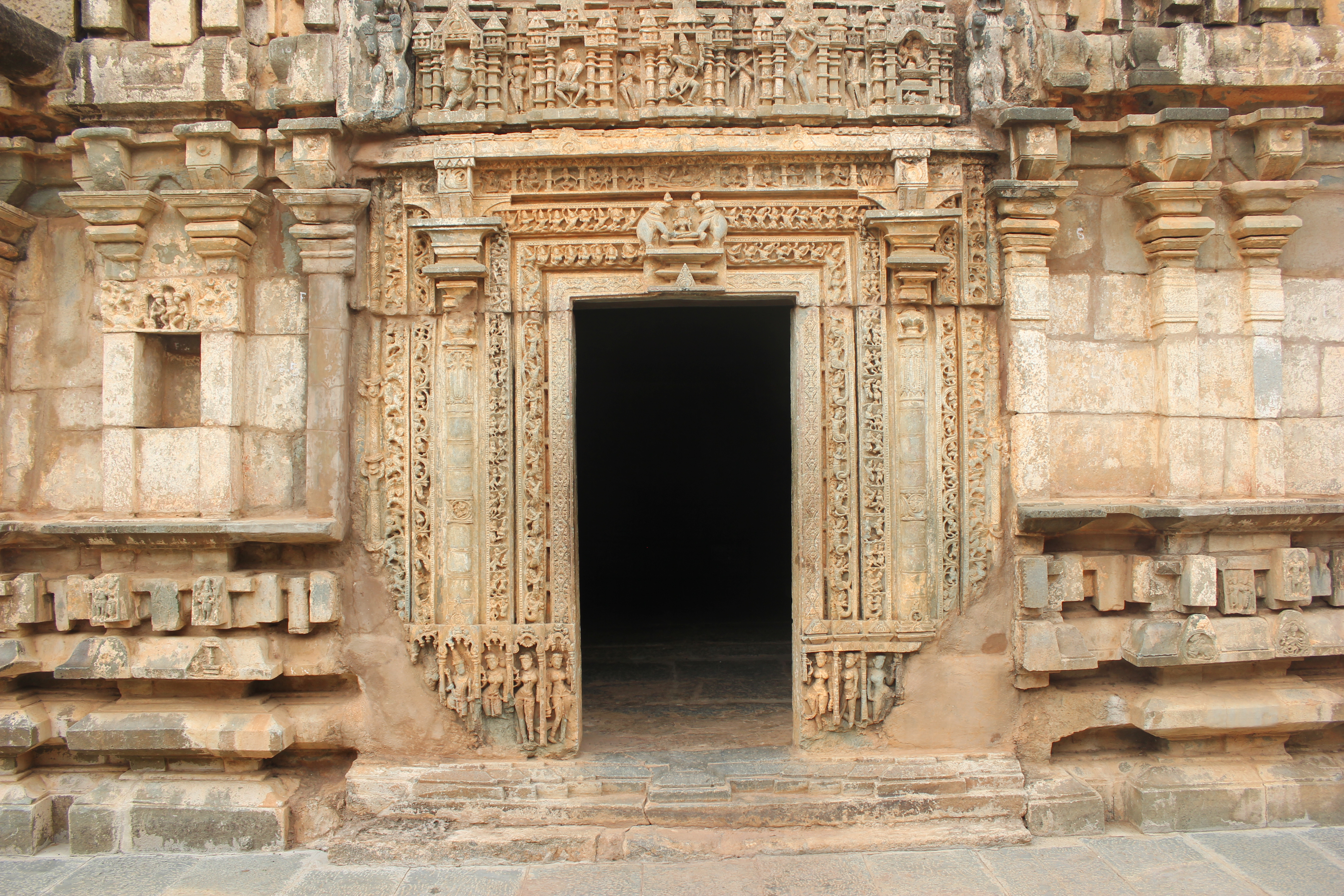
Ornate entrance to the closed hall from the south

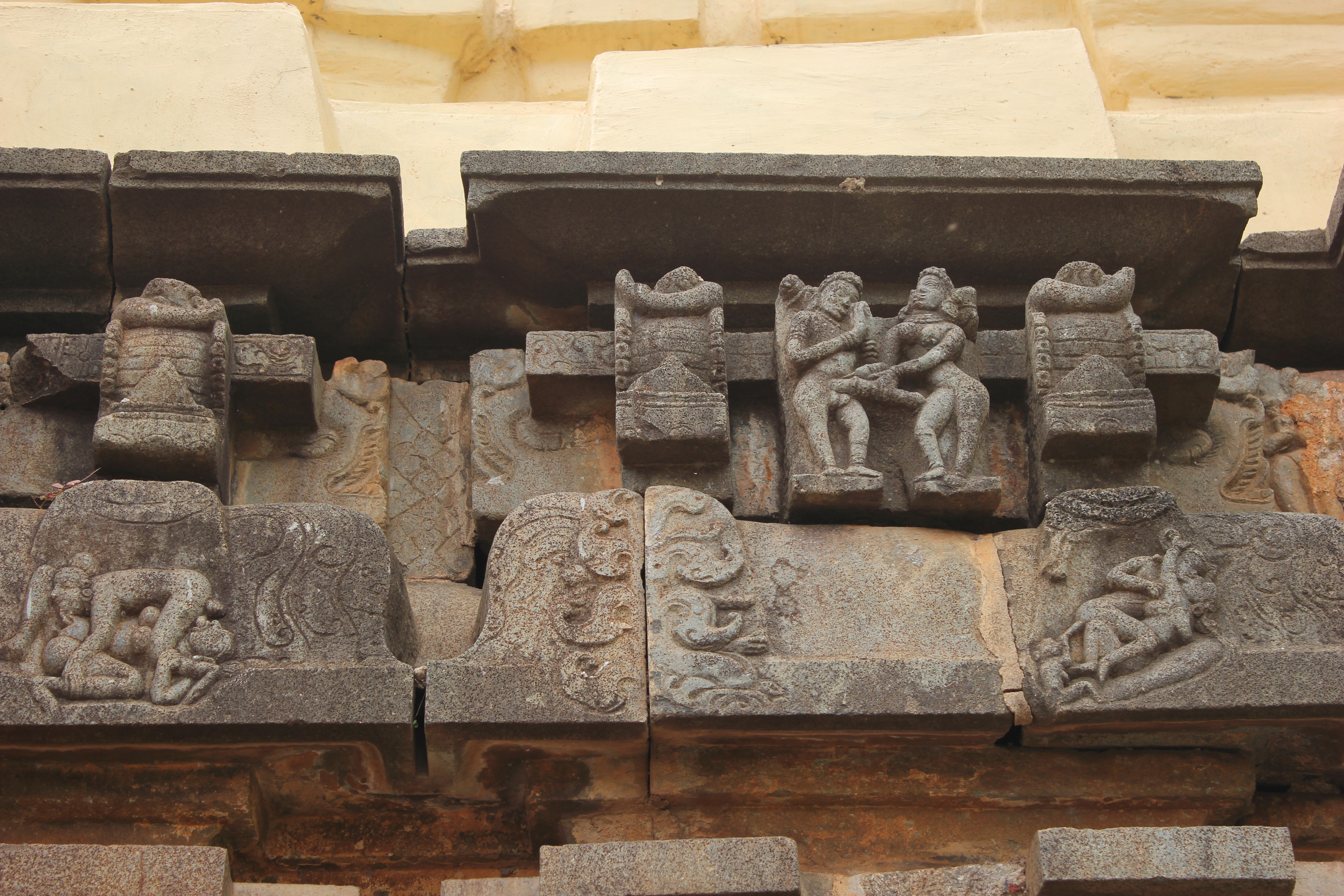
Shrine wall erotic carvings from the Rashtrakuta period in Kalleshvara temple at Bagali

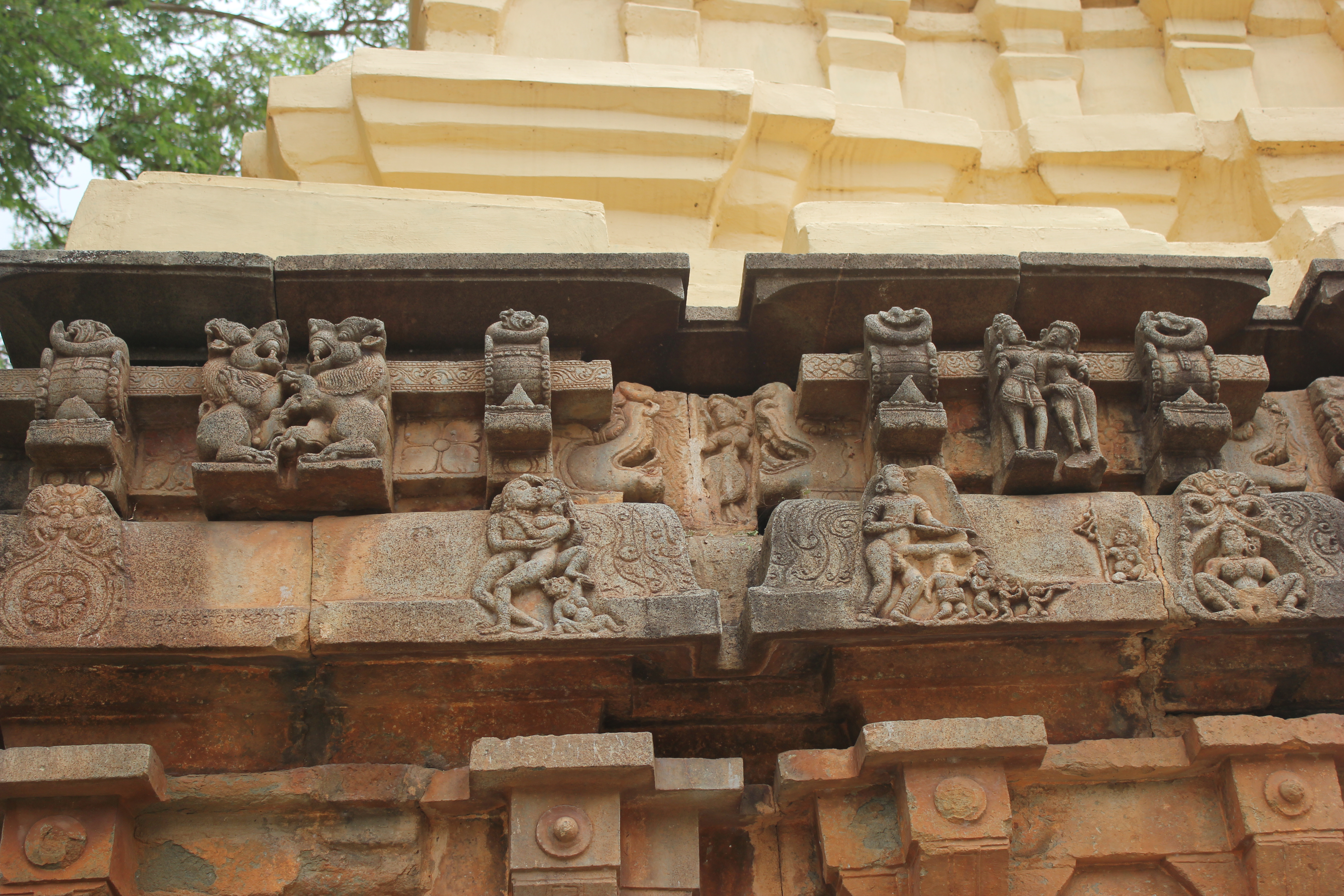
Shrine wall erotic carvings from the Rashtrakuta period in Kalleshvara temple at Bagali

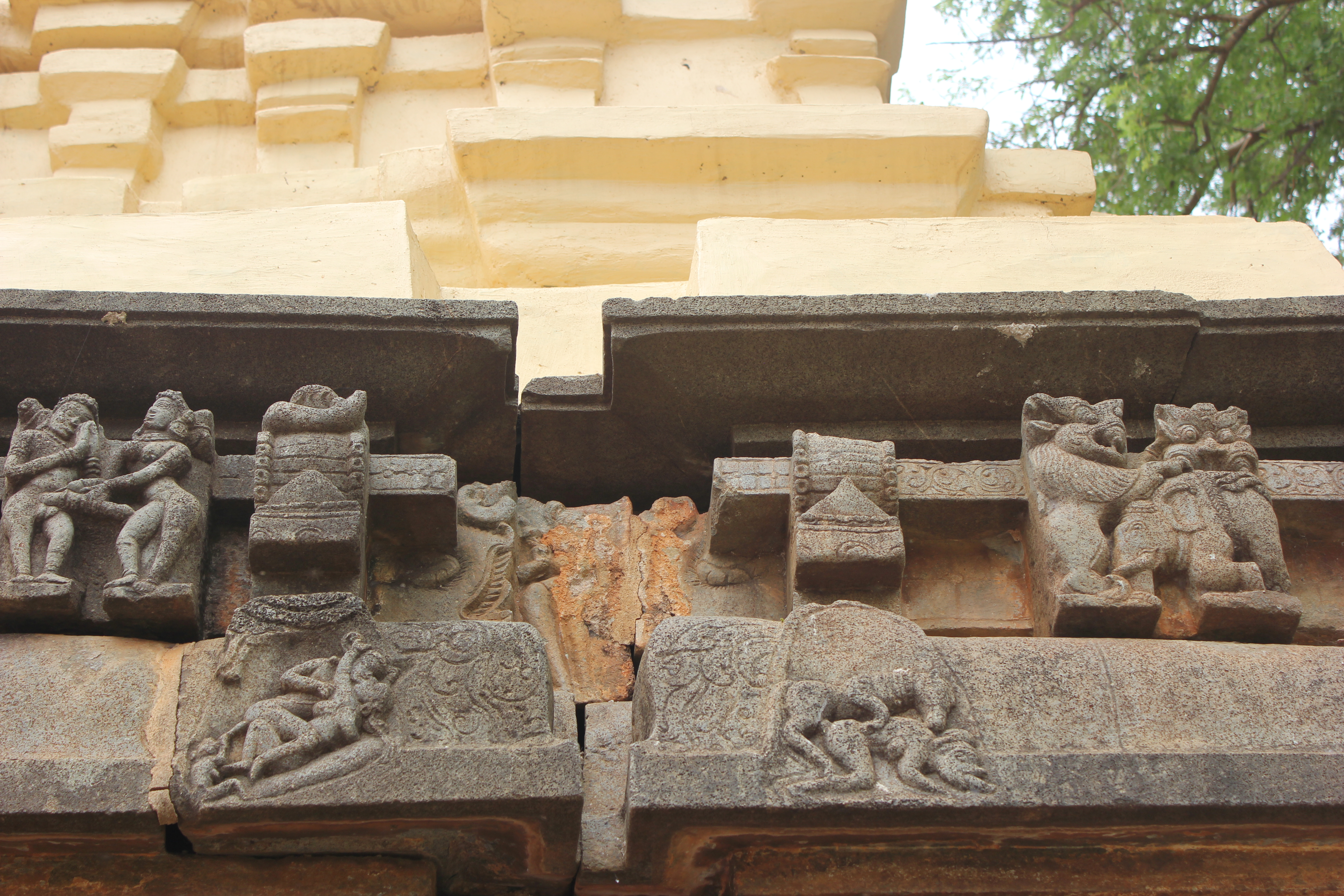
Shrine wall erotic carvings from the Rashtrakuta period in Kalleshvara temple at Bagali

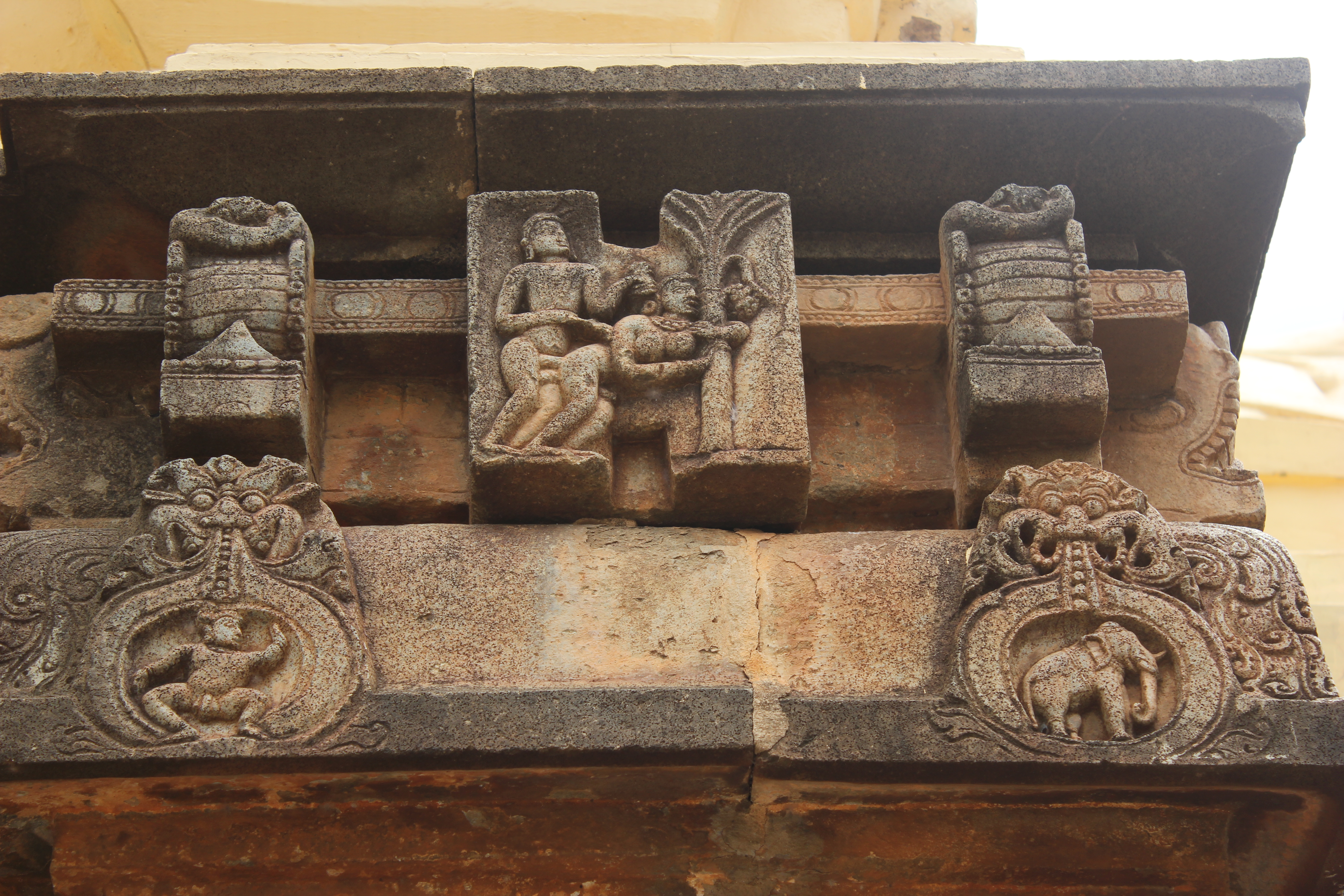
Shrine wall erotic carvings from the Rashtrakuta period in Kalleshvara temple at Bagali
