= Yunes =

Village in Hamadan province, Iran

Yunes Persian: يونس
- Village
- Location within Iran
- Coordinates: 34°09′31″N 48°40′24″E
- Country: Iran
- Province: Hamadan
- County: Malayer
- District: Samen
- Rural District: Samen

Population (2016)
  - Total: 239
- Time zone: UTC+3:30 (IRST)

Yunes (Persian: يونس) (Note: Also romanized as Yoones, Yūnes, and Yūnos; also known as Yūnus) is a village in Samen Rural District of Samen District in Malayer County, Hamadan province, Iran.

== Demographics ==
=== Population ===
At the time of the 2006 National Census, the village's population was 370 in 119 households. The following census in 2011 counted 318 people in 110 households. The 2016 census measured the population of the village as 239 people in 101 households.
