= Avarzaman Rural District =

Rural district in Hamadan province, Iran

Avarzaman Rural District Persian: دهستان اورزمان
- Rural District
- Location within Iran
- Coordinates: 34°17′N 48°28′E
- Country: Iran
- Province: Hamadan
- County: Malayer
- District: Samen
- Established: 1987
- Capital: Avarzaman

Population (2016)
  - Total: 5,667
- Time zone: UTC+3:30 (IRST)

Avarzaman Rural District (Persian: دهستان اورزمان) is in Samen District of Malayer County, Hamadan province, Iran. Its capital is the village of Avarzaman.

== Demographics ==
=== Population ===
At the time of the 2006 National Census, the rural district's population was 6,337 in 1,623 households. There were 6,199 inhabitants in 1,840 households at the following census of 2011. The 2016 census measured the population of the rural district as 5,667 in 1,844 households. The most populous of its 13 villages was Avarzaman, with 1,621 people.

=== Other villages in the rural district ===
- Abbasabad
- Abdar
- Darreh-ye Omid Ali
- Dehlaq
- Durijan
- Jaria
- Luluhar
- Mehdiabad
- Mianzulan
- Mowdaran
