= Cheshmeh Saran, Iran =

Village in Hamadan province, Iran

Cheshmeh Saran Persian: چشمه ساران
- Village
- Location within Iran
- Coordinates: 34°10′13″N 48°32′50″E
- Country: Iran
- Province: Hamadan
- County: Malayer
- District: Samen
- Rural District: Sefidkuh

Population (2016)
  - Total: 109
- Time zone: UTC+3:30 (IRST)

Cheshmeh Saran (Persian: چشمه ساران) (Note: Also romanized as Cheshmeh Sārān; formerly known as Qal‘eh Mīr Ākhur (قلعه میرآخور), also romanized as Qal‘eh-ye Mīr Ākhowr and Qal‘eh-ye Mīr Ākhvor; also known as Mīr Ākhvond, Qal‘eh Milleh Khurd, Qal‘eh-ye Mīleh Khvor, Qal‘eh-ye Mīr Ākhor, Qal‘eh-ye Mīr Ākhūnd, and Qal‘eh-ye Mīr Ākhvond) is a village in Sefidkuh Rural District of Samen District in Malayer County, Hamadan province, Iran.

== Demographics ==
=== Population ===
At the time of the 2006 National Census, the village's population was 151 in 43 households. The following census in 2011 counted 132 people in 43 households. The 2016 census measured the population of the village as 109 people in 41 households.
