= Ərəkit =

- Municipality
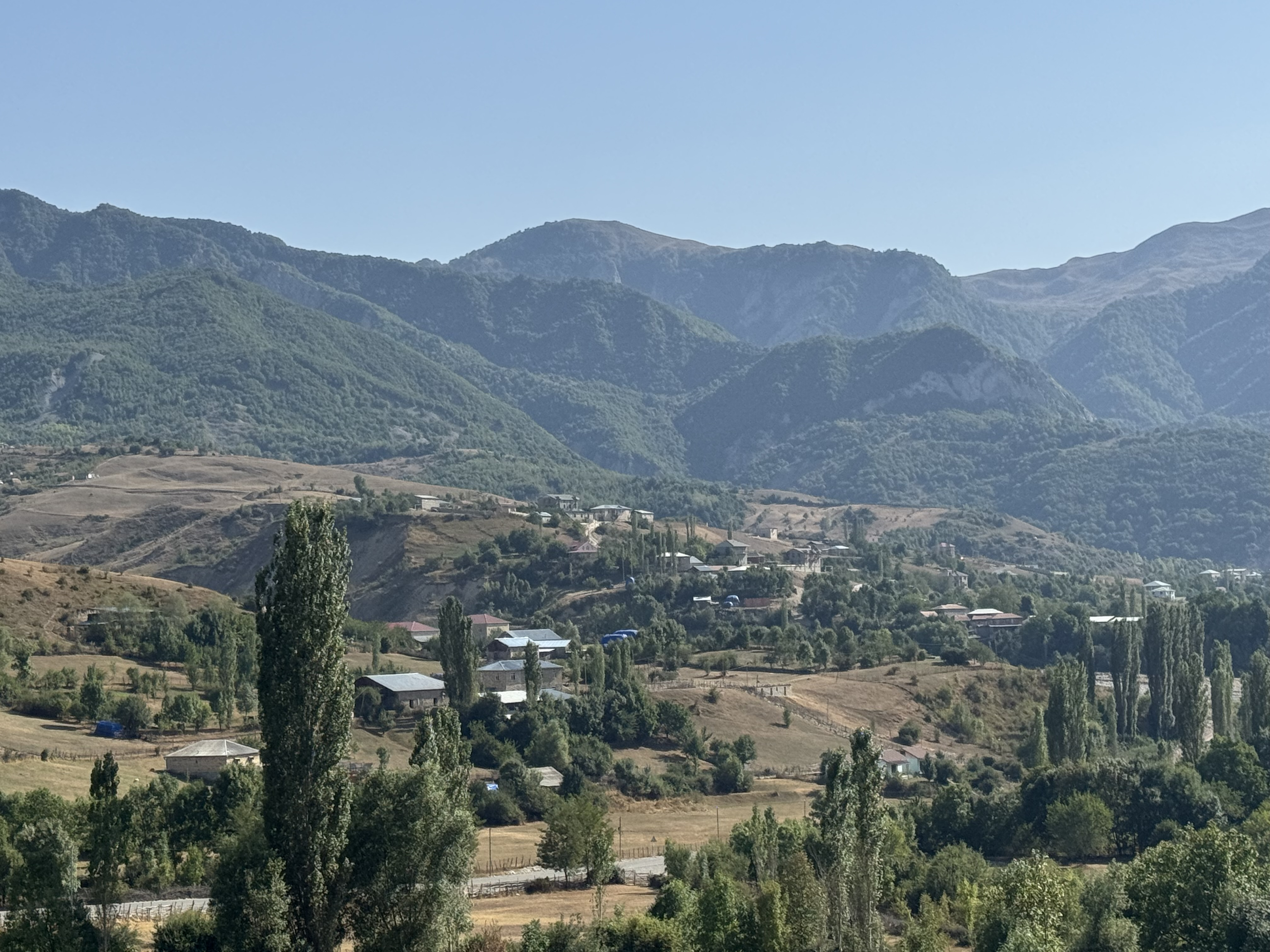

- Location in Azerbaijan
- Coordinates: 40°50′53″N 48°23′09″E
- Country: Azerbaijan
- Rayon: Ismailli

Population
  - Total: 1,106
- Time zone: UTC+4 (AZT)
  - Summer (DST): UTC+5 (AZT)

Ərəkit is a village and municipality in the Ismailli Rayon of Azerbaijan. It has a population of 1,106 people. The municipality consists of the villages of Ərəkit, Bağəli, Namazgah, and Kənəə.
