= Gol Darreh-ye Anuch =

Village in Hamadan province, Iran

Gol Darreh-ye Anuch Persian: گلدره انوچ
- Village
- Location within Iran
- Coordinates: 34°06′08″N 48°35′55″E
- Country: Iran
- Province: Hamadan
- County: Malayer
- District: Samen
- Rural District: Sefidkuh

Population (2016)
  - Total: 99
- Time zone: UTC+3:30 (IRST)

Gol Darreh-ye Anuch (Persian: گلدره انوچ) (Note: Also romanized as Gol Darreh-ye Anūch; also known as Gol Darreh and Gol Darreh-ye Anūj) is a village in Sefidkuh Rural District of Samen District in Malayer County, Hamadan province, Iran.

== Demographics ==
=== Population ===
At the time of the 2006 National Census, the village's population was 189 in 47 households. The following census in 2011 counted 159 people in 44 households. The 2016 census measured the population of the village as 99 people in 26 households.
