= Nazul =

Village in Hamadan province, Iran

Nazul Persian: نازول
- Village
- Location within Iran
- Coordinates: 34°13′42″N 48°43′05″E
- Country: Iran
- Province: Hamadan
- County: Malayer
- District: Samen
- Rural District: Samen

Population (2016)
  - Total: 355
- Time zone: UTC+3:30 (IRST)

Nazul (Persian: نازول) (Note: Also romanized as Nāzūl) is a village in Samen Rural District of Samen District in Malayer County, Hamadan province, Iran.

== Demographics ==
=== Population ===
At the time of the 2006 National Census, the village's population was 417 in 108 households. The following census in 2011 counted 474 people in 160 households. The 2016 census measured the population of the village as 355 people in 125 households.
