= Zarb Ali =

Village in Hamadan province, Iran

Zarb Ali Persian: ضرب علي
- Village
- Location within Iran
- Coordinates: 34°08′51″N 48°44′26″E
- Country: Iran
- Province: Hamadan
- County: Malayer
- District: Samen
- Rural District: Samen

Population (2016)
  - Total: 226
- Time zone: UTC+3:30 (IRST)

Zarb Ali (Persian: ضرب علي) (Note: Also romanized as Ẕarb ‘Alī; also known as Qal‘eh Naqd ‘Ali, Qal‘eh-ye Naqd ‘Alī, Ẕarbeh ‘Alī, and Ẕarbeh‘alī) is a village in Samen Rural District of Samen District in Malayer County, Hamadan province, Iran.

== Demographics ==
=== Population ===
At the time of the 2006 National Census, the village's population was 232 in 68 households. The following census in 2011 counted 274 people in 84 households. The 2016 census measured the population of the village as 226 people in 77 households.
