= Anuch =

Village in Hamadan province, Iran

Anuch Persian: انوچ
- Village
- Location within Iran
- Coordinates: 34°06′27″N 48°34′24″E
- Country: Iran
- Province: Hamadan
- County: Malayer
- District: Samen
- Rural District: Sefidkuh

Population (2016)
  - Total: 1,833
- Time zone: UTC+3:30 (IRST)

Anuch (Persian: انوچ) (Note: Also romanized as Anūch; also known as Anūj) is a village in, and the capital of, Sefidkuh Rural District in Samen District of Malayer County, Hamadan province, Iran.

== Demographics ==
=== Population ===
At the time of the 2006 National Census, the village's population was 1,927 in 476 households. The following census in 2011 counted 1,935 people in 586 households. The 2016 census measured the population of the village as 1,833 people in 581 households, the most populous in its rural district.
