= Samen =

City in Hamadan province, Iran

Samen Persian: سامن
- City
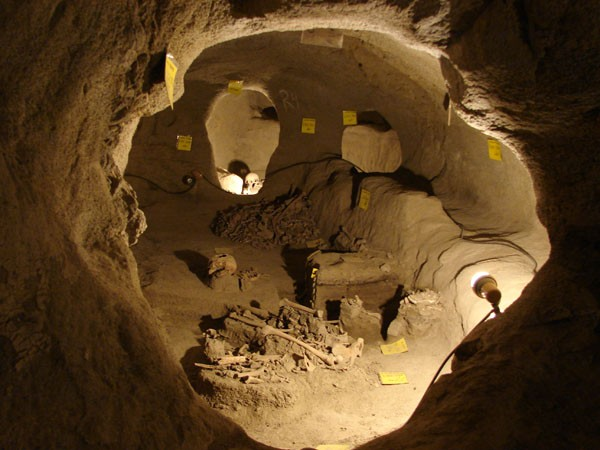
- Underground City of Samen

- Location within Iran
- Coordinates: 34°12′35″N 48°42′13″E
- Country: Iran
- Province: Hamadan
- County: Malayer
- District: Samen

Population (2016)
  - Total: 3,873
- Time zone: UTC+3:30 (IRST)

Samen (Persian: سامن) (Note: Also romanized as Sāman and Sāmen) is a city in, and the capital of, Samen District in Malayer County, Hamadan province, Iran.

== Demographics ==
=== Language ===
The local language in Samen is Luri.

=== Population ===
At the time of the 2006 National Census, the city's population was 4,025 in 1,207 households. The following census in 2011 counted 4,426 people in 1,269 households. The 2016 census measured the population of the city as 3,873 people in 1,268 households.

== Archaeology ==
A subterranean city was discovered beneath Samen, consisting of 25 rooms. The city is believed to be around 2,300 years old, and since its discovery and excavation has been preserved in order to become a tourist attraction and for further study.
