= Namazgjah, Elbasan =

Namazgâh
- Namazgjahu (Albanian)
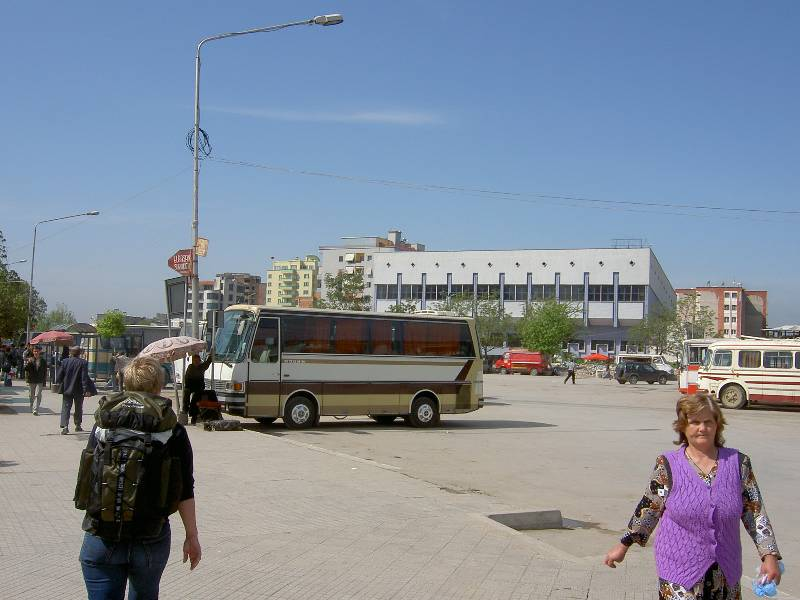
- The former Namazgâh of Elbasan, now a Bus station
- Interactive map of Namazgâh
- Location: Elbasan

Cultural Monument of Albania

The Namazgâh or Namazgjah (Albanian: Namazgjahu) was an open air prayer terrace in Elbasan, Albania. It became a Cultural Monument of Albania in 1980. But nowadays, its place was transformed into a bus station. The Namazgâh is shown on postcards as well as during prayers in Ramadan and Eid al-Fitr on posters.

The name Namazgâh is from Persian نمازگاه and means 'Place of Prayer'.
