= Namazgah, Hamadan =

Village in Hamadan province, Iran

Namazgah Persian: نمازگاه
- Village
- Location within Iran
- Coordinates: 34°14′57″N 48°43′53″E
- Country: Iran
- Province: Hamadan
- County: Malayer
- District: Samen
- Rural District: Samen

Population (2016)
  - Total: 529
- Time zone: UTC+3:30 (IRST)

Namazgah (Persian: نمازگاه) (Note: Also romanized as Namāz Gāh and Namāzgāh) is a village in Samen Rural District of Samen District in Malayer County, Hamadan province, Iran.

== Demographics ==
=== Population ===
At the time of the 2006 National Census, the village's population was 584 in 146 households. The following census in 2011 counted 495 people in 129 households. The 2016 census measured the population of the village as 529 people in 162 households.
