= Sefidkuh Rural District =

Rural district in Hamadan province, Iran

Sefidkuh Rural District Persian: دهستان سفیدکوه
- Rural District
- Location within Iran
- Coordinates: 34°09′N 48°34′E
- Country: Iran
- Province: Hamadan
- County: Malayer
- District: Samen
- Established: 1987
- Capital: Anuch

Population (2016)
  - Total: 4,689
- Time zone: UTC+3:30 (IRST)

Sefidkuh Rural District (Persian: دهستان سفیدکوه) is in Samen District of Malayer County, Hamadan province, Iran. Its capital is the village of Anuch.

== Demographics ==
=== Population ===
At the time of the 2006 National Census, the rural district's population was 5,234 in 1,331 households. There were 4,950 inhabitants in 1,483 households at the following census of 2011. The 2016 census measured the population of the rural district as 4,689 in 1,450 households. The most populous of its 10 villages was Anuch, with 1,833 people.

=== Other villages in the rural district ===
- Ali Morad Khvah
- Anjireh
- Bahareh
- Cheshmeh Saran
- Gol Darreh-ye Anuch
- Qeshlaq-e Anuch
- Rahmanabad-e Anuch
- Zagheh-ye Anuch
