= Malicheh, Fars =

Malicheh ماليچه
- Village
- Location within Iran
- Coordinates: 30°12′10″N 52°41′10″E
- Country: Iran
- Province: Fars
- County: Marvdasht
- Bakhsh: Dorudzan
- Rural District: Abarj

Population (2006)
  - Total: 293
- Time zone: UTC+3:30 (IRST)
  - Summer (DST): UTC+4:30 (IRDT)

Malicheh (Persian: ماليچه, also Romanized as Mālīcheh; also known as Mālīcheh-ye Bālā) is a village in Abarj Rural District, Dorudzan District, Marvdasht County, Fars province, Iran. It houses the Kuh-e Givehpa, a mountain of 485 m (1,591 ft). As of the 2006 census, its population was 293, in 61 families.
