= Kalleh Zarb =

Kalleh Zarb كله ضرب
- Village
- Location within Iran
- Coordinates: 31°54′22″N 49°47′09″E
- Country: Iran
- Province: Khuzestan
- County: Izeh
- Bakhsh: Central
- Rural District: Howmeh-ye Gharbi

Population (2006)
  - Total: 403
- Time zone: UTC+3:30 (IRST)
  - Summer (DST): UTC+4:30 (IRDT)

Kalleh Zarb (Persian: كله ضرب, also Romanized as Kalleh Ẕarb) is a village in Howmeh-ye Gharbi Rural District, in the Central District of Izeh County, Khuzestan Province, Iran. At the 2006 census, its population was 403, in 67 families. in fact this village is GHARLEGHI properties completely.
