= Namazgah, Azerbaijan =

Namazgah
- Location within Azerbaijan
- Coordinates: 40°50′03″N 48°19′55″E
- Country: Azerbaijan
- Rayon: Ismailli
- Municipality: Ərəkit
- Time zone: UTC+4 (AZT)
  - Summer (DST): UTC+5 (AZT)

Namazgah (also, Namazgakh, Namazgi, and Namazgyakh) is a village in the Ismailli Rayon of Azerbaijan. The village forms part of the municipality of Ərəkit.
