= Malicheh Sheykh =

Malicheh Sheykh ماليچه شيخ
- Village
- Location within Iran
- Coordinates: 29°45′38″N 51°15′53″E
- Country: Iran
- Province: Fars
- County: Mamasani
- Bakhsh: Mahvarmilani
- Rural District: Mishan

Population (2006)
  - Total: 124
- Time zone: UTC+3:30 (IRST)
  - Summer (DST): UTC+4:30 (IRDT)

Malicheh Sheykh (Persian: ماليچه شيخ, also Romanized as Mālīcheh Sheykh; also known as Mālcheh Sheykh, Māl-e Sheykh, Mālīcheh, and Māl-i-Shaikh) is a village in Mishan Rural District, Mahvarmilani District, Mamasani County, Fars province, Iran. At the 2006 census, its population was 124, in 25 families.
