= Namazgah, Fars =

Namazgah نمازگاه
- Village
- Location within Iran
- Coordinates: 30°09′27″N 52°01′28″E
- Country: Iran
- Province: Fars
- County: Sepidan
- Bakhsh: Hamaijan
- Rural District: Hamaijan

Population (2006)
  - Total: 86
- Time zone: UTC+3:30 (IRST)
  - Summer (DST): UTC+4:30 (IRDT)

Namazgah (Persian: نمازگاه, also Romanized as Namāzgāh) is a village in Hamaijan Rural District, Hamaijan District, Sepidan County, Fars province, Iran. At the 2006 census, its population was 86, in 25 families.
