= Namazgah, Kurdistan =

Namazgah نمازگاه
- Village
- Location within Iran
- Coordinates: 36°03′38″N 45°42′49″E
- Country: Iran
- Province: Kurdistan
- County: Baneh
- Bakhsh: Namshir
- Rural District: Kani Sur

Population (2006)
  - Total: 146
- Time zone: UTC+3:30 (IRST)
  - Summer (DST): UTC+4:30 (IRDT)

Namazgah (Persian: نمازگاه, also Romanized as Namāzgāh) is a village in Kani Sur Rural District, Namshir District, Baneh County, Kurdistan Province, Iran. At the 2006 census, its population was 146, in 32 families. The village is populated by Kurds.
