= Samen Rural District =

Rural district in Hamadan province, Iran

Samen Rural District Persian: دهستان سامن
- Rural District
- Location within Iran
- Coordinates: 34°11′N 48°43′E
- Country: Iran
- Province: Hamadan
- County: Malayer
- District: Samen
- Established: 1987
- Capital: Kahkadan

Population (2016)
  - Total: 5,396
- Time zone: UTC+3:30 (IRST)

Samen Rural District (Persian: دهستان سامن) is in Samen District of Malayer County, Hamadan province, Iran. Its capital is the village of Kahkadan.

== Demographics ==
=== Population ===
At the time of the 2006 National Census, the rural district's population was 7,114 in 1,844 households. There were 6,687 inhabitants in 2,003 households at the following census of 2011. The 2016 census measured the population of the rural district as 5,396 in 1,759 households. The most populous of its 21 villages was Kahkadan, with 2,230 people.

=== Other villages in the rural district ===
- Namazgah
- Nazul
- Tajar-e Samen
- Vashan
- Yunes
- Zarb Ali
