= Haram Rud-e Sofla Rural District =

Rural district in Hamadan province, Iran

Haram Rud-e Sofla Rural District Persian: دهستان حرم رود سفلي
- Rural District
- Location within Iran
- Coordinates: 34°18′N 48°33′E
- Country: Iran
- Province: Hamadan
- County: Malayer
- District: Samen
- Established: 1987
- Capital: Hoseynabad-e Nazem

Population (2016)
  - Total: 8,460
- Time zone: UTC+3:30 (IRST)

Haram Rud-e Sofla Rural District (Persian: دهستان حرم رود سفلي) is in Samen District of Malayer County, Hamadan province, Iran. Its capital is the village of Hoseynabad-e Nazem.

== Demographics ==
=== Population ===
At the time of the 2006 National Census, the rural district's population was 9,194 in 2,405 households. There were 8,798 inhabitants in 2,688 households at the following census of 2011. The 2016 census measured the population of the rural district as 8,460 in 2,728 households. The most populous of its 19 villages was Hoseynabad-e Nazem, with 3,271 people.

=== Other villages in the rural district ===
- Belartu
- Dehnow-e Avarzaman
- Eskanan
- Kahriz-e Hoseynabad-e Nazem
- Kalilabad
- Kartilabad
