= Samen District =

District in Hamadan province, Iran

Samen District Persian: بخش سامن
- District
- Location within Iran
- Coordinates: 34°13′N 48°37′E
- Country: Iran
- Province: Hamadan
- County: Malayer
- Capital: Samen

Population (2016)
  - Total: 28,085
- Time zone: UTC+3:30 (IRST)

Samen District (Persian: بخش سامن) is in Malayer County, Hamadan province, Iran. Its capital is the city of Samen.

== Demographics ==
=== Population ===
At the time of the 2006 National Census, the district's population was 31,904 in 8,410 households. The following census in 2011 counted 31,060 people in 9,283 households. The 2016 census measured the population of the district as 28,085 inhabitants in 9,049 households.

=== Administrative divisions ===
Samen District Population
Administrative Divisions	2006	2011	2016
Avarzaman RD	6,337	6,199	5,667
Haram Rud-e Sofla RD	9,194	8,798	8,460
Samen RD	7,114	6,687	5,396
Sefidkuh RD	5,234	4,950	4,689
Samen (city)	4,025	4,426	3,873
Total	31,904	31,060	28,085
RD = Rural District
