= Qeynarjeh =

Qeynarjeh or Qeynarjah or Qinarjeh or Qainarjeh or Qaynarjeh (Persian: قينرجه), also rendered as Qinarcheh and Qanizjeh, may refer to:

- Qinarjeh, Ardabil
- Qinarjeh-ye Olya, East Azerbaijan province
- Qinarjeh-ye Sofla, East Azerbaijan province
- Qinarjeh, Maragheh, East Azerbaijan province
- Qeynarjeh, Hamadan
- Qeynarjeh Rural District, Hamadan province
- Qinarjeh, Kurdistan
- Qeynarjeh, Qazvin
- Qinarjeh, Shahin Dezh, West Azerbaijan province
- Qinarjeh, Takab, West Azerbaijan province
- Qinarjeh, Zanjan
- Qeynarjeh, Khodabandeh

== See also ==
- Gheynarjeh
