= Razin, Hamadan =

Village in Hamadan province, Iran

Razin Persian: رازين
- Village
- Location within Iran
- Coordinates: 35°19′57″N 49°08′00″E
- Country: Iran
- Province: Hamadan
- County: Dargazin
- District: Shahanjarin
- Rural District: Dargazin-e Sharqi

Population (2016)
  - Total: 43
- Time zone: UTC+3:30 (IRST)

Razin (Persian: رازين) (Note: Also romanized as Rāzīn) is a village in Dargazin-e Sharqi Rural District of Shahanjarin District in Dargazin County, Hamadan province, Iran.

== Demographics ==
=== Population ===
At the time of the 2006 National Census, the village's population was 92 in 25 households, when it was in Darjazin-e Sofla Rural District (Note: Renamed Dargazin-e Sofla Rural District) of the former Qorveh-ye Darjazin District in Razan County. The following census in 2011 counted 81 people in 25 households. The 2016 census measured the population of the village as 43 people in 16 households.

In 2019, the district was separated from the county in the establishment of Dargazin County. The rural district was transferred to the new Central District and renamed Dargazin-e Sofla Rural District. Razin was transferred to Dargazin-e Sharqi Rural District created in the new Shahanjarin District.
