= Tamuzan =

Village in Hamadan province, Iran

Tamuzan Persian: تموزان
- Village
- Location within Iran
- Coordinates: 35°16′47″N 49°07′58″E
- Country: Iran
- Province: Hamadan
- County: Dargazin
- District: Shahanjarin
- Rural District: Dargazin-e Sharqi

Population (2016)
  - Total: 110
- Time zone: UTC+3:30 (IRST)

Tamuzan (Persian: تموزان) (Note: Also romanized as Tamūzān; also known as Towmīzān and Tumizān) is a village in Dargazin-e Sharqi Rural District of Shahanjarin District in Dargazin County, Hamadan province, Iran.

== Demographics ==
=== Population ===
At the time of the 2006 National Census, the village's population was 200 in 49 households, when it was in Darjazin-e Olya Rural District (Note: Renamed Dargazin-e Olya Rural District) of the former Qorveh-ye Darjazin District in Razan County. The following census in 2011 counted 166 people in 51 households. The 2016 census measured the population of the village as 110 people in 40 households.

In 2019, the district was separated from the county in the establishment of Dargazin County. The rural district was transferred to the new Shahanjarin District and renamed Dargazin-e Olya Rural District. Tamuzan was transferred to Dargazin-e Sharqi Rural District created in the same district.
