= Pir Beg =

Village in Hamadan province, Iran

Pir Beg Persian: پيربگ
- Village
- Location within Iran
- Coordinates: 35°17′07″N 49°07′25″E
- Country: Iran
- Province: Hamadan
- County: Dargazin
- District: Shahanjarin
- Rural District: Dargazin-e Sharqi

Population (2016)
  - Total: 32
- Time zone: UTC+3:30 (IRST)

Pir Beg (Persian: پيربگ) (Note: Also romanized as Pīr Beg; also known as Pīr Bak, Pīr Dak, and Pīrī Beyk) is a village in Dargazin-e Sharqi Rural District of Shahanjarin District in Dargazin County, Hamadan province, Iran.

== Demographics ==
=== Population ===
At the time of the 2006 National Census, the village's population was 58 in 16 households, when it was in Darjazin-e Olya Rural District (Note: Renamed Dargazin-e Olya Rural District) of the former Qorveh-ye Darjazin District in Razan County. The following census in 2011 counted 45 people in 15 households. The 2016 census measured the population of the village as 32 people in 12 households.

In 2019, the district was separated from the county in the establishment of Dargazin County. The rural district was transferred to the new Shahanjarin District and renamed Dargazin-e Olya Rural District. Pir Beg was transferred to Dargazin-e Sharqi Rural District created in the same district.
