= Shanjur =

Village in Hamadan province, Iran

Shanjur Persian: شنجور
- Village
- Location within Iran
- Coordinates: 35°17′50″N 49°10′35″E
- Country: Iran
- Province: Hamadan
- County: Dargazin
- District: Shahanjarin
- Rural District: Dargazin-e Sharqi

Population (2016)
  - Total: 538
- Time zone: UTC+3:30 (IRST)

Shanjur (Persian: شنجور) (Note: Also romanized as Shanjūr) is a village in Dargazin-e Sharqi Rural District of Shahanjarin District in Dargazin County, Hamadan province, Iran.

== Demographics ==
=== Population ===
At the time of the 2006 National Census, the village's population was 561 in 135 households, when it was in Darjazin-e Olya Rural District (Note: Renamed Dargazin-e Olya Rural District) of the former Qorveh-ye Darjazin District in Razan County. The following census in 2011 counted 563 people in 161 households. The 2016 census measured the population of the village as 538 people in 167 households.

In 2019, the district was separated from the county in the establishment of Dargazin County. The rural district was transferred to the new Shahanjarin District and renamed Dargazin-e Olya Rural District. Shanjur was transferred to Dargazin-e Sharqi Rural District created in the same district.
