= Kaj, Hamadan =

Village in Hamadan province, Iran

Kaj Persian: كاج
- Village
- Location within Iran
- Coordinates: 35°18′01″N 49°08′24″E
- Country: Iran
- Province: Hamadan
- County: Dargazin
- District: Shahanjarin
- Rural District: Dargazin-e Sharqi

Population (2016)
  - Total: 1,053
- Time zone: UTC+3:30 (IRST)

Kaj (Persian: كاج) (Note: Also romanized as Kāj; also known as Kach) is a village in, and the capital of, Dargazin-e Sharqi Rural District in Shahanjarin District of Dargazin County, Hamadan province, Iran.

== Demographics ==
=== Population ===
At the time of the 2006 National Census, the village's population was 1,114 in 292 households, when it was in Darjazin-e Olya Rural District (Note: Renamed Dargazin-e Olya Rural District) of the former Qorveh-ye Darjazin District in Razan County. The following census in 2011 counted 1,133 people in 342 households. The 2016 census measured the population of the village as 1,053 people in 334 households.

In 2019, the district was separated from the county in the establishment of Dargazin County. The rural district was transferred to the new Shahanjarin District and renamed Dargazin-e Olya Rural District. Kaj was transferred to Dargazin-e Sharqi Rural District created in the same district.
