= Rakin, Hamadan =

Village in Hamadan province, Iran

Rakin Persian: ركين
- Village
- Location within Iran
- Coordinates: 35°15′13″N 49°06′24″E
- Country: Iran
- Province: Hamadan
- County: Dargazin
- District: Central
- Rural District: Dargazin-e Gharbi

Population (2016)
  - Total: 155
- Time zone: UTC+3:30 (IRST)

Rakin (Persian: ركين) (Note: Also romanized as Rakīn) is a village in Dargazin-e Gharbi Rural District of the Central District in Dargazin County, Hamadan province, Iran.

== Demographics ==
=== Population ===
At the time of the 2006 National Census, the village's population was 283 in 62 households, when it was in Darjazin-e Olya Rural District (Note: Renamed Dargazin-e Olya Rural District) of the former Qorveh-ye Darjazin District in Razan County. The following census in 2011 counted 218 people in 62 households. The 2016 census measured the population of the village as 155 people in 48 households.

In 2019, the district was separated from the county in the establishment of Dargazin County. The rural district was transferred to the new Shahanjarin District and renamed Dargazin-e Olya Rural District. Rakin was transferred to Dargazin-e Gharbi Rural District created in the new Central District.
