= Sayan, Iran =

Village in Hamadan province, Iran

Sayan Persian: سايان
- Village
- Location within Iran
- Coordinates: 35°15′58″N 49°04′22″E
- Country: Iran
- Province: Hamadan
- County: Dargazin
- District: Central
- Rural District: Dargazin-e Gharbi

Population (2016)
  - Total: 677
- Time zone: UTC+3:30 (IRST)

Sayan (Persian: سايان) (Note: Also romanized as Sāyān) is a village in Dargazin-e Gharbi Rural District of the Central District in Dargazin County, Hamadan province, Iran.

== Demographics ==
=== Population ===
At the time of the 2006 National Census, the village's population was 966 in 222 households, when it was in Darjazin-e Sofla Rural District (Note: Renamed Dargazin-e Sofla Rural District) of the former Qorveh-ye Darjazin District in Razan County. The following census in 2011 counted 844 people in 241 households. The 2016 census measured the population of the village as 677 people in 226 households.

In 2019, the district was separated from the county in the establishment of Dargazin County. The rural district was transferred to the new Central District and renamed Dargazin-e Sofla Rural District. Sayan was transferred to Dargazin-e Gharbi Rural District created in same district.
