= Salilak =

Village in Hamadan province, Iran

Salilak Persian: سليلك
- Village
- Location within Iran
- Coordinates: 35°15′10″N 49°07′08″E
- Country: Iran
- Province: Hamadan
- County: Dargazin
- District: Shahanjarin
- Rural District: Dargazin-e Sharqi

Population (2016)
  - Total: 37
- Time zone: UTC+3:30 (IRST)

Salilak (Persian: سليلك) (Note: Also romanized as Salīlak) is a village in Dargazin-e Sharqi Rural District of Shahanjarin District in Dargazin County, Hamadan province, Iran.

== Demographics ==
=== Population ===
At the time of the 2006 National Census, the village's population was 49 in 13 households, when it was in Darjazin-e Olya Rural District (Note: Renamed Dargazin-e Olya Rural District) of the former Qorveh-ye Darjazin District in Razan County. The following census in 2011 counted 41 people in 15 households. The 2016 census measured the population of the village as 37 people in 13 households.

In 2019, the district was separated from the county in the establishment of Dargazin County. The rural district was transferred to the new Shahanjarin District and renamed Dargazin-e Olya Rural District. Salilak was transferred to Dargazin-e Sharqi Rural District created in the same district.
