= Suzan, Hamadan =

Village in Hamadan province, Iran

Suzan Persian: سوزن
- Village
- Location within Iran
- Coordinates: 35°17′15″N 49°09′24″E
- Country: Iran
- Province: Hamadan
- County: Dargazin
- District: Shahanjarin
- Rural District: Dargazin-e Sharqi

Population (2016)
  - Total: 1,180
- Time zone: UTC+3:30 (IRST)

Suzan (Persian: سوزن, also romanized as Soozan and Sūzan) is a village in Dargazin-e Sharqi Rural District of Shahanjarin District in Dargazin County, Hamadan province, Iran.

== Demographics ==
=== Population ===
At the time of the 2006 National Census, the village's population was 1,555 in 422 households, when it was in Darjazin-e Olya Rural District (Note: Renamed Dargazin-e Olya Rural District) of the former Qorveh-ye Darjazin District in Razan County. The following census in 2011 counted 1,406 people in 444 households. The 2016 census measured the population of the village as 1,180 people in 403 households.

In 2019, the district was separated from the county in the establishment of Dargazin County. The rural district was transferred to the new Shahanjarin District and renamed Dargazin-e Olya Rural District. Suzan was transferred to Dargazin-e Sharqi Rural District created in the same district.
