= Behkandan =

Village in Hamadan province, Iran

Behkandan Persian: بهكندان
- Village
- Location within Iran
- Coordinates: 35°16′21″N 49°05′58″E
- Country: Iran
- Province: Hamadan
- County: Dargazin
- District: Central
- Rural District: Dargazin-e Gharbi

Population (2016)
  - Total: 871
- Time zone: UTC+3:30 (IRST)

Behkandan (Persian: بهكندان) (Note: Also romanized as Behkandān and Boḩkandān; also known as Būkandān) is a village in, and the capital of, Dargazin-e Gharbi Rural District in the Central District of Dargazin County, Hamadan province, Iran.

== Demographics ==
=== Population ===
At the time of the 2006 National Census, the village's population was 1,010 in 241 households, when it was in Darjazin-e Sofla Rural District (Note: Renamed Dargazin-e Sofla Rural District) of the former Qorveh-ye Darjazin District in Razan County. The following census in 2011 counted 900 people in 280 households. The 2016 census measured the population of the village as 871 people in 280 households.

In 2019, the district was separated from the county in the establishment of Dargazin County. The rural district was transferred to the new Central District and renamed Dargazin-e Sofla Rural District. Behkandan was transferred to Dargazin-e Gharbi Rural District created in same district.
