= Poshtjin =

Village in Hamadan province, Iran

Poshtjin Persian: پشتجين
- Village
- Location within Iran
- Coordinates: 35°18′51″N 49°04′18″E
- Country: Iran
- Province: Hamadan
- County: Dargazin
- District: Central
- Rural District: Dargazin-e Sofla

Population (2016)
  - Total: 979
- Time zone: UTC+3:30 (IRST)

Poshtjin (Persian: پشتجين) (Note: Also romanized as Poshtjīn; also known as Posht Chīn, Poshteh Jīn, and Pusht-i-Jin) is a village in Dargazin-e Sofla Rural District (Note: Formerly Darjazin-e Sofla Rural District) of the Central District in Dargazin County, Hamadan province, Iran.

== Demographics ==
=== Population ===
At the time of the 2006 National Census, the village's population was 1,092 in 273 households, when it was in Darjazin-e Sofla Rural District (Note: Renamed Dargazin-e Sofla Rural District) of the former Qorveh-ye Darjazin District in Razan County. The following census in 2011 counted 1,120 people in 325 households. The 2016 census measured the population of the village as 979 people in 322 households.

In 2019, the district was separated from the county in the establishment of Dargazin County. The rural district was transferred to the new Central District and renamed Dargazin-e Sofla Rural District.
