= Gonduz, Hamadan =

Village in Hamadan province, Iran

Gonduz Persian: گندوز
- Village
- Location within Iran
- Coordinates: 35°26′43″N 48°38′32″E
- Country: Iran
- Province: Hamadan
- County: Razan
- District: Boghrati
- Rural District: Qeynarjeh

Population (2016)
  - Total: 1,334
- Time zone: UTC+3:30 (IRST)

Gonduz (Persian: گندوز) (Note: Also romanized as Gandūz, Gondooz, and Gondūz) is a village in Qeynarjeh Rural District of Boghrati District in Razan County, Hamadan province, Iran.

== Demographics ==
=== Population ===
At the time of the 2006 National Census, the village's population was 1,572 in 354 households, when it was in Boghrati Rural District of Sardrud District. The following census in 2011 counted 1,578 people in 406 households. The 2016 census measured the population of the village as 1,334 people in 332 households.

In 2023, the rural district was separated from the district in the formation of Boghrati District, and Gonduz was transferred to Qeynarjeh Rural District created in the new district.
