= Chahar Bolagh =

Village in Hamadan province, Iran

Chahar Bolagh Persian: چهاربلاغ
- Village
- Location within Iran
- Coordinates: 35°34′50″N 48°39′01″E
- Country: Iran
- Province: Hamadan
- County: Razan
- District: Boghrati
- Rural District: Qeynarjeh

Population (2016)
  - Total: 832
- Time zone: UTC+3:30 (IRST)

Chahar Bolagh (Persian: چهاربلاغ) (Note: Also romanized as Chahār Bolāgh; also known as Chehār Bulāq) is a village in Qeynarjeh Rural District of Boghrati District in Razan County, Hamadan province, Iran.

== Demographics ==
=== Population ===
At the time of the 2006 National Census, the village's population was 821 in 180 households, when it was in Boghrati Rural District of Sardrud District. The following census in 2011 counted 927 people in 222 households. The 2016 census measured the population of the village as 832 people in 182 households.

In 2023, the rural district was separated from the district in the formation of Boghrati District, and Chahar Bolagh was transferred to Qeynarjeh Rural District created in the new district.
