= Manuchehr, Iran =

Village in Hamadan province, Iran

Manuchehr Persian: منوچهر
- Village
- Location within Iran
- Coordinates: 35°24′49″N 49°12′27″E
- Country: Iran
- Province: Hamadan
- County: Dargazin
- District: Shahanjarin
- Rural District: Dargazin-e Olya

Population (2016)
  - Total: 566
- Time zone: UTC+3:30 (IRST)

Manuchehr (Persian: منوچهر) (Note: Also romanized as Manūchehr) is a village in Dargazin-e Olya Rural District (Note: Formerly Darjazin-e Olya Rural District) of Shahanjarin District in Dargazin County, Hamadan province, Iran.

== Demographics ==
=== Population ===
At the time of the 2006 National Census, the village's population was 622 in 116 households, when it was in Darjazin-e Olya Rural District (Note: Renamed Dargazin-e Olya Rural District) of the former Qorveh-ye Darjazin District in Razan County. The following census in 2011 counted 652 people in 169 households. The 2016 census measured the population of the village as 566 people in 143 households.

In 2019, the district was separated from the county in the establishment of Dargazin County. The rural district was transferred to the new Shahanjarin District and renamed Dargazin-e Olya Rural District.
