= Javar Sajin =

Village in Hamadan province, Iran

Javar Sajin Persian: جاورسجين
- Village
- Location within Iran
- Coordinates: 35°17′09″N 49°13′17″E
- Country: Iran
- Province: Hamadan
- County: Dargazin
- District: Shahanjarin
- Rural District: Dargazin-e Olya

Population (2016)
  - Total: 115
- Time zone: UTC+3:30 (IRST)

Javar Sajin (Persian: جاورسجين) (Note: Also romanized as Jāvar Sajīn) is a village in Dargazin-e Olya Rural District (Note: Formerly Darjazin-e Olya Rural District) of Shahanjarin District in Dargazin County, Hamadan province, Iran.

== Demographics ==
=== Population ===
At the time of the 2006 National Census, the village's population was 194 in 36 households, when it was in Darjazin-e Olya Rural District (Note: Renamed Dargazin-e Olya Rural District) of the former Qorveh-ye Darjazin District in Razan County. The following census in 2011 counted 145 people in 35 households. The 2016 census measured the population of the village as 115 people in 35 households.

In 2019, the district was separated from the county in the establishment of Dargazin County. The rural district was transferred to the new Shahanjarin District and renamed Dargazin-e Olya Rural District.
