= Qaleh-ye Juq Zamani =

Village in Hamadan province, Iran

Qaleh-ye Juq Zamani Persian: قلعه جوق زماني
- Village
- Location within Iran
- Coordinates: 35°31′34″N 48°37′42″E
- Country: Iran
- Province: Hamadan
- County: Razan
- District: Boghrati
- Rural District: Qeynarjeh

Population (2016)
  - Total: 406
- Time zone: UTC+3:30 (IRST)

Qaleh-ye Juq Zamani (Persian: قلعه جوق زماني) (Note: Also romanized as Qal‘eh Jūq Zamānī and Qal‘eh-ye Jūq-e Zamānī; also known as Ghal’eh Jooghé Zamani, Oal‘eh Jūq, and Qal‘eh Jūq)) is a village in Qeynarjeh Rural District of Boghrati District in Razan County, Hamadan province, Iran.

== Demographics ==
=== Population ===
At the time of the 2006 National Census, the village's population was 471 in 106 households, when it was in Boghrati Rural District of Sardrud District. The following census in 2011 counted 458 people in 116 households. The 2016 census measured the population of the village as 406 people in 114 households.

In 2023, the rural district was separated from the district in the formation of Boghrati District, and Qaleh-ye Juq Zamani was transferred to Qeynarjeh Rural District created in the new district.
