= Silak =

Village in Hamadan province, Iran

Silak Persian: سيلك
- Village
- Location within Iran
- Coordinates: 35°26′28″N 49°17′10″E
- Country: Iran
- Province: Hamadan
- County: Dargazin
- District: Central
- Rural District: Dargazin-e Sofla

Population (2016)
  - Total: 238
- Time zone: UTC+3:30 (IRST)

Silak (Persian: سيلك) (Note: Also romanized as Sīlak; formerly known as Lat (لات); also known as Sīlakdarreh) is a village in Dargazin-e Sofla Rural District (Note: Formerly Darjazin-e Sofla Rural District) of the Central District in Dargazin County, Hamadan province, Iran.

== Demographics ==
=== Population ===
At the time of the 2006 National Census, the village's population was 263 in 52 households, when it was in Darjazin-e Sofla Rural District (Note: Renamed Dargazin-e Sofla Rural District) of the former Qorveh-ye Darjazin District in Razan County. The following census in 2011 counted 189 people in 50 households. The 2016 census measured the population of the village as 238 people in 62 households.

In 2019, the district was separated from the county in the establishment of Dargazin County. The rural district was transferred to the new Central District and renamed Dargazin-e Sofla Rural District.
