= Dowlujerdin-e Bala =

Village in Hamadan province, Iran

Dowlujerdin-e Bala Persian: دولوجردين بالا
- Village
- Location within Iran
- Coordinates: 35°20′51″N 49°06′36″E
- Country: Iran
- Province: Hamadan
- County: Dargazin
- District: Central
- Rural District: Dargazin-e Sofla

Population (2016)
  - Total: 117
- Time zone: UTC+3:30 (IRST)

Dowlujerdin-e Bala (Persian: دولوجردين بالا) (Note: Also romanized as Dowlowjerdīn-e Bālā and Dowlūjerdīn-e Bālā; also known as Dolūjerdīn, Dowlūjerd, Dowlūjerdanī-ye Bālā, and Dowlūjerd-e Bālā) is a village in Dargazin-e Sofla Rural District (Note: Formerly Darjazin-e Sofla Rural District) of the Central District in Dargazin County, Hamadan province, Iran.

== Demographics ==
=== Population ===
At the time of the 2006 National Census, the village's population was 79 in 20 households, when it was in Darjazin-e Sofla Rural District (Note: Renamed Dargazin-e Sofla Rural District) of the former Qorveh-ye Darjazin District in Razan County. The following census in 2011 counted 110 people in 35 households. The 2016 census measured the population of the village as 117 people in 38 households.

In 2019, the district was separated from the county in the establishment of Dargazin County. The rural district was transferred to the new Central District and renamed Dargazin-e Sofla Rural District.
