= Yengejeh-ye Karafs =

Village in Hamadan province, Iran

Yengejeh-ye Karafs Persian: ينگجه كرفس
- Village
- Location within Iran
- Country: Iran
- Province: Hamadan
- County: Dargazin
- District: Shahanjarin
- Rural District: Dargazin-e Olya

Population (2016)
  - Total: 17
- Time zone: UTC+3:30 (IRST)

Yengejeh-ye Karafs (Persian: ينگجه كرفس) (Note: Also known as Yengejeh) is a village in Dargazin-e Olya Rural District (Note: Formerly Darjazin-e Olya Rural District) of Shahanjarin District in Dargazin County, Hamadan province, Iran.

== Demographics ==
=== Population ===
At the time of the 2006 National Census, the village's population was 15 in four households, when it was in Darjazin-e Olya Rural District (Note: Renamed Dargazin-e Olya Rural District) of the former Qorveh-ye Darjazin District in Razan County. The following census in 2011 counted 30 people in six households. The 2016 census measured the population of the village as 17 people in four households.

In 2019, the district was separated from the county in the establishment of Dargazin County. The rural district was transferred to the new Shahanjarin District and renamed Dargazin-e Olya Rural District.
