= Owrteh Qamish =

Village in Hamadan province, Iran

Owrteh Qamish Persian: اورته قميش
- Village
- Location within Iran
- Coordinates: 35°34′15″N 48°37′45″E
- Country: Iran
- Province: Hamadan
- County: Razan
- District: Boghrati
- Rural District: Qeynarjeh

Population (2016)
  - Total: 799
- Time zone: UTC+3:30 (IRST)

Owrteh Qamish (Persian: اورته قميش) (Note: Also romanized as Owrteh Qamīsh; also known as Oorteh Ghomish, Orteh Qamīsh, Owrtā Qamīsh, Owrtāq Mīsh, Qāmīsh, Uktakh Ālmaj, Ūktakht Āmlaj, and Ūrtā Qamīsh) is a village in Qeynarjeh Rural District of Boghrati District in Razan County, Hamadan province, Iran.

== Demographics ==
=== Population ===
At the time of the 2006 National Census, the village's population was 834 in 184 households, when it was in Boghrati Rural District of Sardrud District. The following census in 2011 counted 895 people in 214 households. The 2016 census measured the population of the village as 799 people in 236 households.

In 2023, the rural district was separated from the district in the formation of Boghrati District, and Owrteh Qamish was transferred to Qeynarjeh Rural District created in the new district.
