= Shavand =

Village in Hamadan province, Iran

Shavand Persian: شوند
- Village
- Location within Iran
- Coordinates: 35°22′28″N 49°12′38″E
- Country: Iran
- Province: Hamadan
- County: Dargazin
- District: Shahanjarin
- Rural District: Dargazin-e Olya

Population (2016)
  - Total: 924
- Time zone: UTC+3:30 (IRST)

Shavand (Persian: شوند) (Note: Also known as Shāhvand and Shāhvend) is a village in, and the capital of, Dargazin-e Olya Rural District (Note: Formerly Darjazin-e Olya Rural District) in Shahanjarin District of Dargazin County, Hamadan province, Iran. The previous capital of the rural district was the village of Changarin, now the city of Shahanjarin.

== Demographics ==
=== Population ===
At the time of the 2006 National Census, the village's population was 978 in 232 households, when it was in Darjazin-e Olya Rural District (Note: Renamed Dargazin-e Olya Rural District) of the former Qorveh-ye Darjazin District in Razan County. The following census in 2011 counted 955 people in 272 households. The 2016 census measured the population of the village as 924 people in 282 households.

In 2019, the district was separated from the county in the establishment of Dargazin County. The rural district was transferred to the new Shahanjarin District and renamed Dargazin-e Olya Rural District.

== In literature ==
The 14th-century author Hamdallah Mustawfi listed Shavand (as Ashvand) as one of the main villages in the A‘lam district under Hamadan.

== Notable people ==
Bahman Ansari, an Iranian historian and writer, is originally from this village.
