= Yaromjeh Bagh =

Village in Hamadan province, Iran

Yaromjeh Bagh Persian: يارمجه باغ
- Village
- Location within Iran
- Coordinates: 35°31′00″N 48°40′37″E
- Country: Iran
- Province: Hamadan
- County: Razan
- District: Boghrati
- Rural District: Qeynarjeh

Population (2016)
  - Total: 716
- Time zone: UTC+3:30 (IRST)

Yaromjeh Bagh (Persian: يارمجه باغ) (Note: Also romanized as Yāramjah Bāgh, Yāremjeh Bāgh, and Yāromjeh Bāgh; also known as Yaramjābak and Yārmjeh Bolāgh) is a village in Qeynarjeh Rural District of Boghrati District in Razan County, Hamadan province, Iran.

== Demographics ==
=== Population ===
At the time of the 2006 National Census, the village's population was 688 in 138 households, when it was in Boghrati Rural District of Sardrud District. The following census in 2011 counted 748 people in 168 households. The 2016 census measured the population of the village as 716 people in 206 households.

In 2023, the rural district was separated from the district in the formation of Boghrati District, and Yaromjeh Bagh was transferred to Qeynarjeh Rural District created in the new district.
