= Qaraqiyeh, Hamadan =

Village in Hamadan province, Iran

Qaraqiyeh Persian: قراقيه
- Village
- Location within Iran
- Coordinates: 35°16′04″N 49°14′57″E
- Country: Iran
- Province: Hamadan
- County: Dargazin
- District: Shahanjarin
- Rural District: Dargazin-e Olya

Population (2016)
  - Total: 178
- Time zone: UTC+3:30 (IRST)

Qaraqiyeh (Persian: قراقيه) (Note: Also romanized as Qaraqīyeh; also known as Ghara Ghayeh, Qara Qayeh, Qarā Qayeh, Qarah Qīyeh, and Qareh Qayeh) is a village in Dargazin-e Olya Rural District (Note: Formerly Darjazin-e Olya Rural District) of Shahanjarin District in Dargazin County, Hamadan province, Iran.

== Demographics ==
=== Population ===
At the time of the 2006 National Census, the village's population was 286 in 62 households, when it was in Darjazin-e Olya Rural District (Note: Renamed Dargazin-e Olya Rural District) of the former Qorveh-ye Darjazin District in Razan County. The following census in 2011 counted 190 people in 54 households. The 2016 census measured the population of the village as 178 people in 62 households.

In 2019, the district was separated from the county in the establishment of Dargazin County. The rural district was transferred to the new Shahanjarin District and renamed Dargazin-e Olya Rural District.
