= Now Deh, Dargazin =

Village in Hamadan province, Iran

Now Deh Persian: نوده
- Village
- Location within Iran
- Coordinates: 35°18′28″N 49°03′10″E
- Country: Iran
- Province: Hamadan
- County: Dargazin
- District: Central
- Rural District: Dargazin-e Sofla

Population (2016)
  - Total: 0
- Time zone: UTC+3:30 (IRST)

Now Deh (Persian: نوده) is a village in Dargazin-e Sofla Rural District (Note: Formerly Darjazin-e Sofla Rural District) of the Central District in Dargazin County, Hamadan province, Iran.

== Demographics ==
=== Population ===
At the time of the 2006 National Census, the village's population was 24 in six households, when it was in Darjazin-e Sofla Rural District (Note: Renamed Dargazin-e Sofla Rural District) of the former Qorveh-ye Darjazin District in Razan County. The following census in 2011 counted a population below the reporting threshold. The 2016 census measured the population of the village as zero.

In 2019, the district was separated from the county in the establishment of Dargazin County. The rural district was transferred to the new Central District and renamed Dargazin-e Sofla Rural District.
