= Darjazin (disambiguation) =

Darjazin is a city in Semnan Province, Iran.

Darjazin (Persian: درجزين) may also refer to:

- Darjazin, Hamadan, a village in Hamadan Province
- Qorveh-e Darjazin, a city in Hamadan Province
- Darjazin Rural District, in Semnan Province
- Darjazin-e Olya Rural District, in Hamadan Province
- Darjazin-e Sofla Rural District, in Hamadan Province
