= Poli Kan =

Village in Hamadan province, Iran

Poli Kan Persian: پليكان
- Village
- Location within Iran
- Coordinates: 35°17′37″N 49°12′36″E
- Country: Iran
- Province: Hamadan
- County: Dargazin
- District: Shahanjarin
- Rural District: Dargazin-e Olya

Population (2016)
  - Total: 0
- Time zone: UTC+3:30 (IRST)

Poli Kan (Persian: پليكان) (Note: Also romanized as Polī Kān; also known as Palakān and Pīleh Kān) is a village in Dargazin-e Olya Rural District (Note: Formerly Darjazin-e Olya Rural District) of Shahanjarin District in Dargazin County, Hamadan province, Iran.

== Demographics ==
=== Population ===
At the time of the 2006 National Census, the village's population was 89 in 18 households, when it was in Darjazin-e Olya Rural District (Note: Renamed Dargazin-e Olya Rural District) of the former Qorveh-ye Darjazin District in Razan County. The following census in 2011 counted 15 people in four households. The 2016 census measured the population of the village as zero.

In 2019, the district was separated from the county in the establishment of Dargazin County. The rural district was transferred to the new Shahanjarin District and renamed Dargazin-e Olya Rural District.
