= Eynabad, Dargazin =

Village in Hamadan province, Iran

Eynabad Persian: عين اباد
- Village
- Location within Iran
- Coordinates: 35°24′20″N 49°14′43″E
- Country: Iran
- Province: Hamadan
- County: Dargazin
- District: Shahanjarin
- Rural District: Dargazin-e Olya

Population (2016)
  - Total: 904
- Time zone: UTC+3:30 (IRST)

Eynabad (Persian: عين اباد) (Note: Also romanized as ‘Aīnābād and ‘Eynābād) is a village in Dargazin-e Olya Rural District (Note: Formerly Darjazin-e Olya Rural District) of Shahanjarin District in Dargazin County, Hamadan province, Iran.

== Demographics ==
=== Population ===
At the time of the 2006 National Census, the village's population was 1,401 in 345 households, when it was in Darjazin-e Olya Rural District (Note: Renamed Dargazin-e Olya Rural District) of the former Qorveh-ye Darjazin District in Razan County. The following census in 2011 counted 1,332 people in 375 households. The 2016 census measured the population of the village as 904 people in 304 households.

In 2019, the district was separated from the county in the establishment of Dargazin County. The rural district was transferred to the new Shahanjarin District and renamed Dargazin-e Olya Rural District.
