= Omman =

Village in Hamadan province, Iran

Omman Persian: عمان
- Village
- Location within Iran
- Coordinates: 35°19′56″N 49°06′36″E
- Country: Iran
- Province: Hamadan
- County: Dargazin
- District: Central
- Rural District: Dargazin-e Gharbi

Population (2016)
  - Total: 2,305
- Time zone: UTC+3:30 (IRST)

Omman (Persian: عمان) (Note: Also romanized as ‘Ommān) is a village in Dargazin-e Gharbi Rural District of the Central District in Dargazin County, Hamadan province, Iran.

== Demographics ==
=== Population ===
At the time of the 2006 National Census, the village's population was 1,936 in 480 households, when it was in Darjazin-e Sofla Rural District (Note: Renamed Dargazin-e Sofla Rural District) of the former Qorveh-ye Darjazin District in Razan County. The following census in 2011 counted 2,364 people in 671 households. The 2016 census measured the population of the village as 2,305 people in 710 households, the most populous in its rural district.

In 2019, the district was separated from the county in the establishment of Dargazin County. The rural district was transferred to the new Central District and renamed Dargazin-e Sofla Rural District. Omman was transferred to Dargazin-e Gharbi Rural District created in same district.
