= Hakan, Iran =

Village in Hamadan province, Iran

Hakan Persian: حكان
- Village
- Location within Iran
- Coordinates: 35°26′36″N 49°07′57″E
- Country: Iran
- Province: Hamadan
- County: Dargazin
- District: Central
- Rural District: Dargazin-e Sofla

Population (2016)
  - Total: 1,063
- Time zone: UTC+3:30 (IRST)

Hakan (Persian: حكان) (Note: Also romanized as Ḩakān and Ḩakkān; also known as Hagān) is a village in Dargazin-e Sofla Rural District (Note: Formerly Darjazin-e Sofla Rural District) of the Central District in Dargazin County, Hamadan province, Iran.

== Demographics ==
=== Population ===
At the time of the 2006 National Census, the village's population was 930 in 182 households, when it was in Darjazin-e Sofla Rural District (Note: Renamed Dargazin-e Sofla Rural District) of the former Qorveh-ye Darjazin District in Razan County. The following census in 2011 counted 997 people in 217 households. The 2016 census measured the population of the village as 1,063 people in 256 households.

In 2019, the district was separated from the county in the establishment of Dargazin County. The rural district was transferred to the new Central District and renamed Dargazin-e Sofla Rural District.
