= Sang Garan Kuh =

Village in Hamadan province, Iran

Sang Garan Kuh Persian: سنگ گران كوه
- Village
- Location within Iran
- Coordinates: 35°26′32″N 49°16′33″E
- Country: Iran
- Province: Hamadan
- County: Dargazin
- District: Shahanjarin
- Rural District: Dargazin-e Olya

Population (2016)
  - Total: 213
- Time zone: UTC+3:30 (IRST)

Sang Garan Kuh (Persian: سنگ گران كوه) (Note: Also romanized as Sang Garān Kūh; formerly known as Shahbolaghi (شاه‌بلاغي)) is a village in Dargazin-e Olya Rural District (Note: Formerly Darjazin-e Olya Rural District) of Shahanjarin District in Dargazin County, Hamadan province, Iran.

== Demographics ==
=== Population ===
At the time of the 2006 National Census, the village's population was 203 in 60 households, when it was in Darjazin-e Olya Rural District (Note: Renamed Dargazin-e Olya Rural District) of the former Qorveh-ye Darjazin District in Razan County. The following census in 2011 counted 208 people in 59 households. The 2016 census measured the population of the village as 213 people in 71 households.

In 2019, the district was separated from the county in the establishment of Dargazin County. The rural district was transferred to the new Shahanjarin District and renamed Dargazin-e Olya Rural District.
