= Zakan, Hamadan =

Village in Hamadan province, Iran

Zakan Persian: زاكان
- Village
- Location within Iran
- Coordinates: 35°28′40″N 49°10′37″E
- Country: Iran
- Province: Hamadan
- County: Dargazin
- District: Central
- Rural District: Dargazin-e Sofla

Population (2016)
  - Total: 121
- Time zone: UTC+3:30 (IRST)

Zakan (Persian: زاكان) (Note: Also romanized as Zākān; also known as Zahkān and Zakān) is a village in Dargazin-e Sofla Rural District (Note: Formerly Darjazin-e Sofla Rural District) of the Central District in Dargazin County, Hamadan province, Iran.

== Demographics ==
=== Population ===
At the time of the 2006 National Census, the village's population was 158 in 30 households, when it was in Darjazin-e Sofla Rural District (Note: Renamed Dargazin-e Sofla Rural District) of the former Qorveh-ye Darjazin District in Razan County. The following census in 2011 counted 130 people in 36 households. The 2016 census measured the population of the village as 121 people in 30 households.

In 2019, the district was separated from the county in the establishment of Dargazin County. The rural district was transferred to the new Central District and renamed Dargazin-e Sofla Rural District.
