= Dargazin, Hamadan =

Village in Hamadan province, Iran

Dargazin Persian: درگزین
- Village
- Location within Iran
- Coordinates: 35°21′38″N 49°04′31″E
- Country: Iran
- Province: Hamadan
- County: Dargazin
- District: Central
- Rural District: Dargazin-e Sofla

Population (2016)
  - Total: 1,331
- Time zone: UTC+3:30 (IRST)

Dargazin (Persian: درگزین) (Note: Formerly known as Darjazin (درجزين), also romanized as Darjazīn; also known as Darvazīn and Daryazīn) is a village in, and the capital of, Dargazin-e Sofla Rural District (Note: Formerly Darjazin-e Sofla Rural District) in the Central District of Dargazin County, Hamadan province, Iran.

== History ==
In the 11th century, the Darjazin area had a significant population of Mazdakis and the related Khorramites. The Dargazini family of viziers was also from the area.

The 14th-century author Hamdallah Mustawfi described Darjazin (as Darguzīn) as previously "merely a village of the A‘lam district" that had become "a provincial capital" by his lifetime. He wrote that it had good agricultural lands that produced grain, cotton, grapes, and other fruits. Its population, he said, were devout Sunnis of the Shafi'i madhhab (i.e. the Shafi'i sub-school of Islam) who followed the Shaykh al-Islam Sharaf ad-Din Darguzini. The revenue of Darguzin, he wrote, was 12,000 dinars.

The Ottoman traveller Evliya Çelebi passed through Darjazin in 1654 and left a description of the town's layout, as well as its garrison and fort. Evliya associated the fort with an unspecified Sasanian king named Yazdegerd, which possibly refers to Yazdegerd I. No traces of the fort survive today. By the time of Evliya's visit, Darjazin's population had become Shi'i; he described the Moharram mourning rites observed here. In the 1700s, Darjazin became contested between Iran and the Ottoman Empire.

== Demographics ==
=== Population ===
At the time of the 2006 National Census, the village's population was 2,629 in 689 households, when it was in Darjazin-e Sofla Rural District (Note: Renamed Dargazin-e Sofla Rural District) of the former Qorveh-ye Darjazin District in Razan County. The following census in 2011 counted 1,345 people in 396 households. The 2016 census measured the population of the village as 1,331 people in 406 households.

In 2019, the district was separated from the county in the establishment of Dargazin County. The rural district was transferred to the new Central District and renamed Dargazin-e Sofla Rural District.

== Shrine ==
The shrine of Emamzadeh Azhar in Darjazin is dated to the Ilkhanid era; it may be the tomb of either Shaykh Salman 'Aref Dargazini (13th century) or the above-mentioned Sharaf ad-Din Dargazini (14th century). The shrine itself has a circular tower with a conical dome that reaches 12 m off the ground at its highest point. There is a wooden chest in the shrine which bears the date 1056 AH, or 1646 CE; part of the chest is missing.
