= Churmaq, Razan =

Village in Hamadan province, Iran

Churmaq Persian: چورمق
- Village
- Location within Iran
- Coordinates: 35°22′52″N 48°43′43″E
- Country: Iran
- Province: Hamadan
- County: Razan
- District: Boghrati
- Rural District: Boghrati

Population (2016)
  - Total: 1,545
- Time zone: UTC+3:30 (IRST)

Churmaq (Persian: چورمق) (Note: Also romanized as Chowrmaq and Chūrmaq; also known as Choormagh Sardrood) is a village in Boghrati Rural District of Boghrati District in Razan County, Hamadan province, Iran.

== Demographics ==
=== Population ===
At the time of the 2006 National Census, the village's population was 1,834 in 403 households, when it was in Sardrud District. The following census in 2011 counted 1,898 people in 450 households. The 2016 census measured the population of the village as 1,545 people in 441 households.

In 2023, the rural district was separated from the district in the formation of Boghrati District.
