= Kamandan, Hamadan =

Village in Hamadan province, Iran

Kamandan Persian: كمندان
- Village
- Location within Iran
- Coordinates: 35°20′16″N 49°07′29″E
- Country: Iran
- Province: Hamadan
- County: Dargazin
- District: Central
- Rural District: Dargazin-e Sofla

Population (2016)
  - Total: 224
- Time zone: UTC+3:30 (IRST)

Kamandan (Persian: كمندان) (Note: Also romanized as Kamandān) is a village in Dargazin-e Sofla Rural District (Note: Formerly Darjazin-e Sofla Rural District) of the Central District in Dargazin County, Hamadan province, Iran.

== Demographics ==
=== Population ===
At the time of the 2006 National Census, the village's population was 298 in 67 households, when it was in Darjazin-e Sofla Rural District (Note: Renamed Dargazin-e Sofla Rural District) of the former Qorveh-ye Darjazin District in Razan County. The following census in 2011 counted 259 people in 75 households. The 2016 census measured the population of the village as 224 people in 68 households.

In 2019, the district was separated from the county in the establishment of Dargazin County. The rural district was transferred to the new Central District and renamed Dargazin-e Sofla Rural District.
