= Qeynarjeh, Hamadan =

Village in Hamadan province, Iran

Qeynarjeh Persian: قينرجه
- Village
- Location within Iran
- Coordinates: 35°29′20″N 48°38′57″E
- Country: Iran
- Province: Hamadan
- County: Razan
- District: Boghrati
- Rural District: Qeynarjeh

Population (2016)
  - Total: 2,041
- Time zone: UTC+3:30 (IRST)

Qeynarjeh (Persian: قينرجه) (Note: Also romanized as Qaynarjah and Qeynarjeh; also known as Ghaynarjeh, Gheynarjeh, and Kanīr Jatr) is a village in, and the capital of, Qeynarjeh Rural District in Boghrati District of Razan County, Hamadan province, Iran.

== Demographics ==
=== Population ===
At the time of the 2006 National Census, the village's population was 2,233 in 582 households, when it was in Boghrati Rural District of Sardrud District. The following census in 2011 counted 2,194 people in 578 households. The 2016 census measured the population of the village as 2,041 people in 625 households.

In 2023, the rural district was separated from the district in the formation of Boghrati District, and Qeynarjeh was transferred to Qeynarjeh Rural District created in the new district.
