= Qarakand, Razan =

Village in Hamadan province, Iran

Qarakand Persian: قراكند
- Village
- Location within Iran
- Coordinates: 35°21′50″N 48°45′01″E
- Country: Iran
- Province: Hamadan
- County: Razan
- District: Boghrati
- Rural District: Boghrati

Population (2016)
  - Total: 580
- Time zone: UTC+3:30 (IRST)

Qarakand (Persian: قراكند) (Note: Also romanized as Qarākand; also known as Gharakand Sardrood, Qarah Kand, and Qareh Kand) is a village in Boghrati Rural District of Boghrati District in Razan County, Hamadan province, Iran.

== Demographics ==
=== Population ===
At the time of the 2006 National Census, the village's population was 962 in 171 households, when it was in Sardrud District. The following census in 2011 counted 900 people in 216 households. The 2016 census measured the population of the village as 580 people in 149 households.

In 2023, the rural district was separated from the district in the formation of Boghrati District.
