= Qaleh-ye Zendlij =

Village in Hamadan province, Iran

Qaleh-ye Zendlij Persian: قلعه زندليج
- Village
- Location within Iran
- Coordinates: 35°22′02″N 48°48′26″E
- Country: Iran
- Province: Hamadan
- County: Razan
- District: Boghrati
- Rural District: Boghrati

Population (2016)
  - Total: 340
- Time zone: UTC+3:30 (IRST)

Qaleh-ye Zendlij (Persian: قلعه زندليج) (Note: Also romanized as Qal‘eh-ye Zendlīj) is a village in Boghrati Rural District of Boghrati District in Razan County, Hamadan province, Iran.

== Demographics ==
=== Population ===
At the time of the 2006 National Census, the village's population was 444 in 94 households, when it was in Sardrud District. The following census in 2011 counted 405 people in 107 households. The 2016 census measured the population of the village as 340 people in 96 households.

In 2023, the rural district was separated from the district in the formation of Boghrati District.
