= Sonqorabad, Hamadan =

Village in Hamadan province, Iran

Sonqorabad Persian: سنقرآباد
- Village
- Location within Iran
- Coordinates: 35°16′17″N 49°16′25″E
- Country: Iran
- Province: Hamadan
- County: Dargazin
- District: Shahanjarin
- Rural District: Dargazin-e Olya

Population (2016)
  - Total: 960
- Time zone: UTC+3:30 (IRST)

Sonqorabad (Persian: سنقرآباد) (Note: Also romanized as Sonqorābād; also known as Sangarābād and Songhor Abad) is a village in Dargazin-e Olya Rural District (Note: Formerly Darjazin-e Olya Rural District) of Shahanjarin District in Dargazin County, Hamadan province, Iran.

== Demographics ==
=== Population ===
At the time of the 2006 National Census, the village's population was 1,253 in 294 households, when it was in Darjazin-e Olya Rural District (Note: Renamed Dargazin-e Olya Rural District) of the former Qorveh-ye Darjazin District in Razan County. The following census in 2011 counted 1,191 people in 349 households. The 2016 census measured the population of the village as 960 people in 323 households.

In 2019, the district was separated from the county in the establishment of Dargazin County. The rural district was transferred to the new Shahanjarin District and renamed Dargazin-e Olya Rural District.
