= Qader Khalaj =

Village in Hamadan province, Iran

Qader Khalaj Persian: قادرخلج
- Village
- Location within Iran
- Coordinates: 35°24′04″N 48°43′48″E
- Country: Iran
- Province: Hamadan
- County: Razan
- District: Boghrati
- Rural District: Boghrati

Population (2016)
  - Total: 1,034
- Time zone: UTC+3:30 (IRST)

Qader Khalaj (Persian: قادرخلج) (Note: Also romanized as Qāder Khalaj; also known as Ghader Khalaj and Qādīr Khala) is a village in Boghrati Rural District of Boghrati District in Razan County, Hamadan province, Iran.

== Demographics ==
=== Population ===
At the time of the 2006 National Census, the village's population was 1,308 in 265 households, when it was in Sardrud District. The following census in 2011 counted 1,327 people in 307 households. The 2016 census measured the population of the village as 1,034 people in 297 households.

In 2023, the rural district was separated from the district in the formation of Boghrati District.
