= Dibi =

Dibi may refer to:

== People ==
- Jamal Dibi (born 1979), Dutch football player
- Souad Dibi, Moroccan activist
- Tofik Dibi (born 1980), Dutch politician

== Places ==
- Boundiali Airport, by ICAO code
- Dibi is an Indian village located in Siwan district, Bihar.
- Dibis a district in Kirkuk Governorate, Iraq.
- Tappeh Dibi village in Boghrati District, Hamadan Province, Iran.

== Foods ==
- Dibi (food) a popular Senegalese dish of fire-grilled meat.
- Kazan dibi is a Turkish dessert.
