= Karafs =

City in Hamadan province, Iran

Karafs Persian: كرفس
- City
- Location within Iran
- Coordinates: 35°21′45″N 49°18′01″E
- Country: Iran
- Province: Hamadan
- County: Dargazin
- District: Shahanjarin
- Established: 2018

Population (2016)
  - Total: 4,155
- Time zone: UTC+3:30 (IRST)

Karafs (Persian: كرفس) (Note: Also romanized as Krafs) is a city in Shahanjarin District of Dargazin County, Hamadan province, Iran.

== Demographics ==
=== Population ===
At the time of the 2006 National Census, Karafs's population was 4,041 in 951 households, when it was a village in Darjazin-e Olya Rural District (Note: Renamed Dargazin-e Olya Rural District) of the former Qorveh-ye Darjazin District in Razan County. The following census in 2011 counted 4,086 people in 1,127 households. The 2016 census measured the population of the village as 4,155 people in 1,250 households, the most populous in its rural district.

Karafs was converted to a city in 2018, and the district was separated from the county in the establishment of Dargazin County the following year. In addition, the rural district was transferred to the new Shahanjarin District and renamed Dargazin-e Olya Rural District.
