= Takht, Hamadan =

Village in Hamadan province, Iran

Takht Persian: تخت
- Village
- Location within Iran
- Coordinates: 35°35′32″N 48°43′22″E
- Country: Iran
- Province: Hamadan
- County: Razan
- District: Sardrud
- Rural District: Sardrud-e Olya

Population (2016)
  - Total: 2,104
- Time zone: UTC+3:30 (IRST)

Takht (Persian: تخت) is a village in Sardrud-e Olya Rural District of Sardrud District in Razan County, Hamadan province, Iran.

== Demographics ==
=== Population ===
At the time of the 2006 National Census, the village's population was 1,883 in 404 households. The following census in 2011 counted 2,107 people in 531 households. The 2016 census measured the population of the village as 2,104 people in 565 households.
