= Mansurabad, Hamadan =

Village in Hamadan province, Iran

Mansurabad Persian: منصوراباد
- Village
- Location within Iran
- Coordinates: 35°37′24″N 48°52′03″E
- Country: Iran
- Province: Hamadan
- County: Razan
- District: Sardrud
- Rural District: Sardrud-e Olya

Population (2016)
  - Total: 197
- Time zone: UTC+3:30 (IRST)

Mansurabad (Persian: منصوراباد) (Note: Also romanized as Mansoor Abad and Manşūrābād) is a village in Sardrud-e Olya Rural District of Sardrud District in Razan County, Hamadan province, Iran.

== Demographics ==
=== Population ===
At the time of the 2006 National Census, the village's population was 331 in 68 households. The following census in 2011 counted 262 people in 70 households. The 2016 census measured the population of the village as 197 people in 67 households.
