= Khanjarabad, Hamadan =

Village in Hamadan province, Iran

Khanjarabad Persian: خنجراباد
- Village
- Location within Iran
- Coordinates: 35°26′45″N 48°53′15″E
- Country: Iran
- Province: Hamadan
- County: Razan
- District: Sardrud
- Rural District: Sardrud-e Sofla

Population (2016)
  - Total: 623
- Time zone: UTC+3:30 (IRST)

Khanjarabad (Persian: خنجراباد) (Note: Also romanized as Khanjarābād) is a village in Sardrud-e Sofla Rural District of Sardrud District in Razan County, Hamadan province, Iran.

== Demographics ==
=== Population ===
At the time of the 2006 National Census, the village's population was 745 in 152 households. The following census in 2011 counted 695 people in 189 households. The 2016 census measured the population of the village as 623 people in 179 households.
