= Ojaq =

Village in Hamadan province, Iran

Ojaq Persian: اجاق
- Village
- Location within Iran
- Coordinates: 35°38′22″N 48°50′45″E
- Country: Iran
- Province: Hamadan
- County: Razan
- District: Sardrud
- Rural District: Sardrud-e Olya

Population (2016)
  - Total: 397
- Time zone: UTC+3:30 (IRST)

Ojaq (Persian: اجاق) (Note: Also romanized as Ojāq; also known as Ojagh and Ūchāq) is a village in Sardrud-e Olya Rural District of Sardrud District in Razan County, Hamadan province, Iran.

== Demographics ==
=== Population ===
At the time of the 2006 National Census, the village's population was 621 in 121 households. The following census in 2011 counted 531 people in 130 households. The 2016 census measured the population of the village as 397 people in 119 households.
