= Pileh Jin =

Village in Hamadan province, Iran

Pileh Jin Persian: پيله جين
- Village
- Location within Iran
- Coordinates: 35°23′02″N 48°51′21″E
- Country: Iran
- Province: Hamadan
- County: Razan
- District: Sardrud
- Rural District: Sardrud-e Sofla

Population (2016)
  - Total: 408
- Time zone: UTC+3:30 (IRST)

Pileh Jin (Persian: پيله جين) (Note: Also romanized as Pīleh Jīn; also known as Pelī Jīn, Pelījīn, Pīlajīn, and Pīlī Jīn) is a village in Sardrud-e Sofla Rural District of Sardrud District in Razan County, Hamadan province, Iran.

== Demographics ==
=== Population ===
At the time of the 2006 National Census, the village's population was 397 in 92 households. The following census in 2011 counted 393 people in 101 households. The 2016 census measured the population of the village as 408 people in 110 households.
