= Kal Kabud =

Village in Hamadan province, Iran

Kal Kabud Persian: كل كبود
- Village
- Location within Iran
- Coordinates: 35°28′52″N 48°51′09″E
- Country: Iran
- Province: Hamadan
- County: Razan
- District: Sardrud
- Rural District: Sardrud-e Sofla

Population (2016)
  - Total: 419
- Time zone: UTC+3:30 (IRST)

Kal Kabud (Persian: كل كبود) (Note: Also romanized as Kal Kabūd; also known as Gol Kabūd) is a village in Sardrud-e Sofla Rural District of Sardrud District in Razan County, Hamadan province, Iran.

== Demographics ==
=== Population ===
At the time of the 2006 National Census, the village's population was 534 in 130 households. The following census in 2011 counted 509 people in 143 households. The 2016 census measured the population of the village as 419 people in 123 households.
