= Qaleh-ye Shater Bali =

Village in Hamadan province, Iran

Qaleh-ye Shater Bali Persian: قلعه شاطربالي
- Village
- Location within Iran
- Coordinates: 35°27′20″N 48°49′36″E
- Country: Iran
- Province: Hamadan
- County: Razan
- District: Sardrud
- Rural District: Sardrud-e Sofla

Population (2016)
  - Total: 695
- Time zone: UTC+3:30 (IRST)

Qaleh-ye Shater Bali (Persian: قلعه شاطربالي) (Note: Also romanized as Qal‘eh-ye Shāţer Bālī; also known as Qal‘eh Shātirbāle and Shāţer Bālī) is a village in Sardrud-e Sofla Rural District of Sardrud District in Razan County, Hamadan province, Iran.

== Demographics ==
=== Population ===
At the time of the 2006 National Census, the village's population was 800 in 203 households. The following census in 2011 counted 775 people in 226 households. The 2016 census measured the population of the village as 695 people in 215 households.
