= Chopoqlu, Razan =

Village in Hamadan province, Iran

Chopoqlu Persian: چپقلو
- Village
- Location within Iran
- Coordinates: 35°39′33″N 48°49′20″E
- Country: Iran
- Province: Hamadan
- County: Razan
- District: Sardrud
- Rural District: Sardrud-e Olya

Population (2016)
  - Total: 390
- Time zone: UTC+3:30 (IRST)

Chopoqlu (Persian: چپقلو) (Note: Also romanized as Chepeqlū and Chopoqlū; also known as Chābūglū, Chapalū, Chopeglū, and Chopogh Loo) is a village in Sardrud-e Olya Rural District of Sardrud District in Razan County, Hamadan province, Iran.

== Demographics ==
=== Population ===
At the time of the 2006 National Census, the village's population was 430 in 105 households. The following census in 2011 counted 455 people in 130 households. The 2016 census measured the population of the village as 390 people in 126 households.
