= Qayesh =

Village in Hamadan province, Iran

Qayesh Persian: قايش
- Village
- Location within Iran
- Coordinates: 35°29′46″N 48°52′01″E
- Country: Iran
- Province: Hamadan
- County: Razan
- District: Sardrud
- Rural District: Sardrud-e Sofla

Population (2016)
  - Total: 1,472
- Time zone: UTC+3:30 (IRST)

Qayesh (Persian: قايش) (Note: Also romanized as Qāyesh; also known as Ghayesh and Qaīsh Tepe) is a village in Sardrud-e Sofla Rural District of Sardrud District in Razan County, Hamadan province, Iran.

== Demographics ==
=== Population ===
At the time of the 2006 National Census, the village's population was 1,385 in 323 households. The following census in 2011 counted 1,648 people in 443 households. The 2016 census measured the population of the village as 1,472 people in 434 households.
