= Shahanjarin =

City in Hamadan province, Iran

Shahanjarin Persian: شاهنجرین
- City
- Location within Iran
- Coordinates: 35°18′24″N 49°10′15″E
- Country: Iran
- Province: Hamadan
- County: Dargazin
- District: Shahanjarin
- Established as a city: 2023

Population (2016)
  - Total: 1,584
- Time zone: UTC+3:30 (IRST)

Shahanjarin (Persian: شاهنجرین) (Note: Formerly the village of Changarin (چانگرين), also romanized as Chāngarīn) is a city in, and the capital of, Shahanjarin District in Dargazin County, Hamadan province, Iran. As the village of Changarin, it was the capital of Darjazin-e Olya Rural District (Note: Renamed Dargazin-e Olya Rural District) until its capital was transferred to the village of Shavand.

== Demographics ==
=== Population ===
At the time of the 2006 National Census, Shahanjarin's population was 2,224 in 558 households, when it was the village of Changarin in Darjazin-e Olya Rural District of the former Qorveh-ye Darjazin District in Razan County. The following census in 2011 counted 2,362 people in 677 households. The 2016 census measured the population of the village as 1,584 people in 597 households.

In 2019, the district was separated from the county in the establishment of Dargazin County. The rural district was transferred to the new Shahanjarin District and renamed Dargazin-e Olya Rural District. At the same time, the village of Changarin was renamed Shahanjarin, and was converted to a city in 2023.
