= Sarlah, Hamadan =

Sarlah سرله
- Village
- Location within Iran
- Coordinates: 35°28′08″N 48°50′56″E
- Country: Iran
- Province: Hamadan
- County: Razan
- Bakhsh: Sardrud
- Rural District: Sardrud-e Sofla

Population (2006)
  - Total: 108
- Time zone: UTC+3:30 (IRST)
  - Summer (DST): UTC+4:30 (IRDT)

Sarlah (Persian: سرله) is a village in Sardrud-e Sofla Rural District, Sardrud District, Razan County, Hamadan Province, Iran. At the 2006 census, its population was 108, in 20 families.
