= Khvorvandeh =

Village in Hamadan province, Iran

Khvorvandeh Persian: خورونده
- Village
- Location within Iran
- Coordinates: 35°31′34″N 48°47′29″E
- Country: Iran
- Province: Hamadan
- County: Razan
- District: Sardrud
- Rural District: Sardrud-e Olya

Population (2016)
  - Total: 2,026
- Time zone: UTC+3:30 (IRST)

Khvorvandeh (Persian: خورونده) (Note: Also romanized as Khurvandeh, Khūrvandeh, and Khvorvandeh; also known as Khowovandeh and Khurbandāh) is a village in, and the capital of, Sardrud-e Olya Rural District in Sardrud District of Razan County, Hamadan province, Iran.

== Demographics ==
=== Population ===
At the time of the 2006 National Census, the village's population was 1,821 in 390 households. The following census in 2011 counted 2,020 people in 589 households. The 2016 census measured the population of the village as 2,026 people in 611 households.
