= Dargazin-e Sharqi Rural District =

Rural district in Hamadan province, Iran

Dargazin-e Sharqi Rural District Persian: دهستان درگزین شرقی
- Rural District
- Location within Iran
- Coordinates: 35°18′N 49°11′E
- Country: Iran
- Province: Hamadan
- County: Dargazin
- District: Shahanjarin
- Established: 2019
- Capital: Kaj
- Time zone: UTC+3:30 (IRST)

Dargazin-e Sharqi Rural District (Persian: دهستان درگزین شرقی) is in Shahanjarin District of Dargazin County, Hamadan province, Iran. Its capital is the village of Kaj, whose population at the time of the 2016 National Census was 1,053 in 334 households.

== History ==
In 2019, Qorveh-ye Darjazin District separated from Razan County in the establishment of Dargazin County, and Dargazin-e Sharqi Rural District was created in the new Shahanjarin District.

== Other villages in the rural district ==
- Mesinak
- Pir Beg
- Razin
- Salilak
- Shanjur
- Suzan
- Tamuzan
- Valashejerd
- Vasmaq
