= Baba Nazar, Hamadan =

Village in Hamadan province, Iran

Baba Nazar Persian: بابانظر
- Village
- Location within Iran
- Coordinates: 35°27′40″N 48°41′54″E
- Country: Iran
- Province: Hamadan
- County: Razan
- District: Boghrati
- Rural District: Boghrati

Population (2016)
  - Total: 3,255
- Time zone: UTC+3:30 (IRST)

Baba Nazar (Persian: بابانظر) (Note: Also romanized as Bābā Naz̧ar) is a village in, and the former capital of, Boghrati Rural District in Boghrati District of Razan County, Hamadan province, Iran, serving as capital of the district. The capital of the rural district has been transferred to the village of Tappeh-ye Dibi.

== Demographics ==
=== Population ===
At the time of the 2006 National Census, the village's population was 3,301 in 681 households, when it was in Sardrud District. The following census in 2011 counted 3,415 people in 887 households. The 2016 census measured the population of the village as 3,255 people in 832 households, the most populous in its rural district.

In 2023, the rural district was separated from the district in the formation of Boghrati District.
