= Saroleh =

Saroleh or Sarelah or Sarlah (Persian: سرله) may refer to:

- Sarlah, Hamadan
- Saroleh, Khuzestan
- Saroleh Rural District, in Khuzestan Province
