= Kahriz-e Boqazi =

Village in Hamadan province, Iran

Kahriz-e Boqazi Persian: كهريزبقازي
- Village
- Location within Iran
- Coordinates: 35°30′43″N 48°49′07″E
- Country: Iran
- Province: Hamadan
- County: Razan
- District: Sardrud
- Rural District: Sardrud-e Olya

Population (2016)
  - Total: 793
- Time zone: UTC+3:30 (IRST)

Kahriz-e Boqazi (Persian: كهريزبقازي) (Note: Also romanized as Kahrīz Boqāzī and Kahrīz-e Boqāzī; also known as Kahrīz Boghāzī, Kahrizé Boghazi, and Kārīz Bukāz) is a village in Sardrud-e Olya Rural District of Sardrud District in Razan County, Hamadan province, Iran.

== Demographics ==
=== Population ===
At the time of the 2006 National Census, the village's population was 874 in 181 households. The following census in 2011 counted 820 people in 209 households. The 2016 census measured the population of the village as 793 people in 225 households.
