= Qaraylar, Iran =

Qaraylar قرايلر
- Village
- Location within Iran
- Coordinates: 35°23′59″N 48°54′46″E
- Country: Iran
- Province: Hamadan
- County: Razan
- Bakhsh: Sardrud
- Rural District: Sardrud-e Sofla

Population (2006)
  - Total: 32
- Time zone: UTC+3:30 (IRST)
  - Summer (DST): UTC+4:30 (IRDT)

Qaraylar (Persian: قرايلر, also Romanized as Qarāylar and Qarailar; also known as Gharatlar and Gharaylar) is a village in Sardrud-e Sofla Rural District, Sardrud District, Razan County, Hamadan Province, Iran. At the 2006 census, its population was 32, in 6 families.
