= Gav Savar, Razan =

Village in Hamadan province, Iran

Gav Savar Persian: گاوسوار
- Village
- Location within Iran
- Coordinates: 35°29′16″N 48°48′42″E
- Country: Iran
- Province: Hamadan
- County: Razan
- District: Sardrud
- Rural District: Sardrud-e Olya

Population (2016)
  - Total: 722
- Time zone: UTC+3:30 (IRST)

Gav Savar (Persian: گاوسوار) (Note: Also romanized as Gāv Savār; also known as Goswār) is a village in Sardrud-e Olya Rural District of Sardrud District in Razan County, Hamadan province, Iran.

== Demographics ==
=== Population ===
At the time of the 2006 National Census, the village's population was 862 in 241 households. The following census in 2011 counted 802 people in 261 households. The 2016 census measured the population of the village as 722 people in 247 households.
