= Tulki =

Tulki (Persian: تولكي) may refer to:

- Tulki, Hamadan
- Tulki, South Khorasan
- Tulki, West Azerbaijan
