= Tappeh-ye Dibi =

Village in Hamadan province, Iran

Tappeh-ye Dibi Persian: تپه ديبي
- Village
- Location within Iran
- Coordinates: 35°25′47″N 48°41′44″E
- Country: Iran
- Province: Hamadan
- County: Razan
- District: Boghrati
- Rural District: Boghrati

Population (2016)
  - Total: 851
- Time zone: UTC+3:30 (IRST)

Tappeh Dibi (Persian: تپه ديبي) (Note: Also romanized as Tapeh Dibi, Tappah Dībī, Tappeh Dībee, Tappeh Dībī, and Tappehdībī; also known as Tepe Dapi) is a village in, and the capital of, Boghrati Rural District in Boghrati District of Razan County, Hamadan province, Iran. The previous capital of the rural district was the village of Baba Nazar.

== Demographics ==
=== Population ===
At the time of the 2006 National Census, the village's population was 1,033 in 186 households, when it was in Sardrud District. The following census in 2011 counted 990 people in 230 households. The 2016 census measured the population of the village as 851 people in 222 households.

In 2023, the rural district was separated from the district in the formation of Boghrati District.
