= Veyar, Hamadan =

Veyar وير
- Village
- Location within Iran
- Coordinates: 35°24′55″N 48°53′49″E
- Country: Iran
- Province: Hamadan
- County: Razan
- Bakhsh: Sardrud
- Rural District: Sardrud-e Sofla

Population (2006)
  - Total: 53
- Time zone: UTC+3:30 (IRST)
  - Summer (DST): UTC+4:30 (IRDT)

Veyar (Persian: وير) is a village in Sardrud-e Sofla Rural District, Sardrud District, Razan County, Hamadan Province, Iran. At the 2006 census, its population was 53, in 14 families.
