= Molla Bodagh =

Village in Hamadan province, Iran

Molla Bodagh Persian: ملابداغ
- Village
- Location within Iran
- Coordinates: 35°37′53″N 48°44′16″E
- Country: Iran
- Province: Hamadan
- County: Razan
- District: Sardrud
- Rural District: Sardrud-e Olya

Population (2016)
  - Total: 3,210
- Time zone: UTC+3:30 (IRST)

Molla Bodagh (Persian: ملابداغ) (Note: Also romanized as Mollā Bodāgh; also known as Mollā Bodākh and Mūlla Badaq) is a village in Sardrud-e Olya Rural District of Sardrud District in Razan County, Hamadan province, Iran.

== Demographics ==
=== Population ===
At the time of the 2006 National Census, the village's population was 2,589 in 540 households. The following census in 2011 counted 2,940 people in 751 households. The 2016 census measured the population of the village as 3,210 people in 901 households, the most populous in its rural district.
