= Chayan, Razan =

Village in Hamadan province, Iran

Chayan Persian: چايان
- Village
- Location within Iran
- Coordinates: 35°23′39″N 48°48′54″E
- Country: Iran
- Province: Hamadan
- County: Razan
- District: Sardrud
- Rural District: Sardrud-e Sofla

Population (2016)
  - Total: 975
- Time zone: UTC+3:30 (IRST)

Chayan (Persian: چايان) (Note: Also romanized as Chāyān; also known as Chayan Sardrood) is a village in Sardrud-e Sofla Rural District of Sardrud District in Razan County, Hamadan province, Iran.

== Demographics ==
=== Population ===
At the time of the 2006 National Census, the village's population was 1,109 in 245 households. The following census in 2011 counted 1,090 people in 290 households. The 2016 census measured the population of the village as 975 people in 298 households.
