= Arpa Darreh =

Village in Hamadan province, Iran

Qarah Bolagh Persian: قره بلاغ
- Village
- Location within Iran
- Coordinates: 35°41′25″N 48°48′20″E
- Country: Iran
- Province: Hamadan
- County: Razan
- District: Sardrud
- Rural District: Sardrud-e Olya

Population (2016)
  - Total: 1,061
- Time zone: UTC+3:30 (IRST)

Arpa Darreh (Persian: آرپادره) (Note: Also romanized as Ārpā Darreh and Ārpādarah; also known as Ārpeh Darreh) is a village in Sardrud-e Olya Rural District of Sardrud District in Razan County, Hamadan province, Iran.

== Demographics ==
=== Population ===
At the time of the 2006 National Census, the village's population was 955 in 229 households. The following census in 2011 counted 932 people in 247 households. The 2016 census measured the population of the village as 804 people in 251 households.
