= Qarah Bolagh, Razan =

Village in Hamadan province, Iran

Qarah Bolagh Persian: قره بلاغ
- Village
- Location within Iran
- Coordinates: 35°33′35″N 48°45′12″E
- Country: Iran
- Province: Hamadan
- County: Razan
- District: Sardrud
- Rural District: Sardrud-e Olya

Population (2016)
  - Total: 1,061
- Time zone: UTC+3:30 (IRST)

Qarah Bolagh (Persian: قره بلاغ) (Note: Also romanized as Qarah Bolāgh and Qareh Bolāgh; also known as Ghareh Bolagh Sardrood and Qara Bulāq) is a village in Sardrud-e Olya Rural District of Sardrud District in Razan County, Hamadan province, Iran.

== Demographics ==
=== Population ===
At the time of the 2006 National Census, the village's population was 844 in 167 households. The following census in 2011 counted 1,028 people in 247 households. The 2016 census measured the population of the village as 1,061 people in 298 households.
