= Aqcheh Kharabeh =

Village in Hamadan province, Iran

Aqcheh Kharabeh Persian: آقچه خرابه
- Village
- Location within Iran
- Coordinates: 35°42′49″N 48°46′35″E
- Country: Iran
- Province: Hamadan
- County: Razan
- District: Sardrud
- Rural District: Sardrud-e Olya

Population (2016)
  - Total: 141
- Time zone: UTC+3:30 (IRST)

Aqcheh Kharabeh (Persian: آقچه خرابه) (Note: Also romanizeed as Āqcheh Kharābeh and Āqcheh-ye Kharābeh; also known as Āghcheh Kharābeh, Aghcheh Kharabeh, Akhārja Khārāweh, and Āqjeh-ye Kharābeh) is a village in Sardrud-e Olya Rural District of Sardrud District in Razan County, Hamadan province, Iran.

== Demographics ==
=== Population ===
At the time of the 2006 National Census, the village's population was 134 in 28 households. The following census in 2011 counted 142 people in 31 households. The 2016 census measured the population of the village as 141 people in 41 households.
