= Songhor =

Songhor may refer to:

- Sonqor, Iran
- Songhor Lagoon, Ghana
- Songhor Abad, Iran
- Songhor Town, Nandi Hills, Kenya
