= Tulki Tappeh =

Village in Hamadan province, Iran

Tulki Tappeh Persian: تولكي تپه
- Village
- Location within Iran
- Coordinates: 35°29′42″N 48°57′27″E
- Country: Iran
- Province: Hamadan
- County: Razan
- District: Sardrud
- Rural District: Sardrud-e Sofla

Population (2016)
  - Total: 461
- Time zone: UTC+3:30 (IRST)

Tulki Tappeh (Persian: تولكي تپه) (Note: Also romanized as Toolki Tapeh and Tūlkī Tappeh; also known as Tolkī Tappeh, Tork Tappeh, Tūlkī, and Turki Tepe) is a village in Sardrud-e Sofla Rural District of Sardrud District in Razan County, Hamadan province, Iran.

== Demographics ==
=== Population ===
At the time of the 2006 National Census, the village's population was 451 in 99 households. The following census in 2011 counted 480 people in 131 households. The 2016 census measured the population of the village as 461 people in 139 households.
