= Qeynarjeh Rural District =

Rural district in Hamadan province, Iran

Qeynarjeh Rural District Persian: دهستان قینرجه
- Rural District
- Location within Iran
- Coordinates: 35°32′N 48°39′E
- Country: Iran
- Province: Hamadan
- County: Razan
- District: Boghrati
- Established: 2023
- Capital: Qeynarjeh
- Time zone: UTC+3:30 (IRST)

Qeynarjeh Rural District (Persian: دهستان قینرجه) is in Boghrati District of Razan County, Hamadan province, Iran. Its capital is the village of Qeynarjeh, whose population at the time of the 2016 National Census was 2,041 in 625 households.

== History ==
In 2023, Boghrati Rural District separated from Sardrud District in the formation of Boghrati District, and Qeynarjeh Rural District was created in the new district.

== Other villages in the rural district ==
- Chahar Bolagh
- Gonduz
- Owrteh Qamish
- Qaleh-ye Juq Zamani
- Yaromjeh Bagh
