= Zakan =

Zakan may refer to:

- Zakan Jugelia (d. 2009), Abkhazian politician
- Zakan, Hamadan, a village in Iran
- Zakan, Qazvin, a village in Iran
