= Veyar =

Veyar or Viyar or Viar or Vir (Persian: وير) may refer to:

- Veyar, Hamadan
- Vir, Markazi
- Viyar, Zanjan
