= Mesnik =

Mesnik may refer to:

- William Mesnik (b. 1953), American actor
- Mesnik, Iran, a village in Hamadan Province, Iran
