= Dargazin-e Gharbi Rural District =

Rural district in Hamadan province, Iran

Dargazin-e Gharbi Rural District Persian: دهستان درگزین غربی
- Rural District
- Location within Iran
- Coordinates: 35°17′50″N 49°05′37″E
- Country: Iran
- Province: Hamadan
- County: Dargazin
- District: Central
- Capital: Behkandan
- Time zone: UTC+3:30 (IRST)

Dargazin-e Gharbi Rural District (Persian: دهستان درگزین غربی) is in the Central District of Dargazin County, Hamadan province, Iran. Its capital is the village of Behkandan, whose population at the time of the 2016 National Census was 871 in 280 households.

== History ==
In 2019, Qorveh-ye Darjazin District was separated from Razan County in the establishment of Dargazin County, and Dargazin-e Gharbi Rural District was created in the new Central District.

== Other villages in the rural district ==
- Nezamabad
- Omman
- Rakin
- Sayan
