= Kamandan =

Kamandan (Persian: كمندان) may refer to:

- Kamandan, Hamadan
- Kamandan, Isfahan
- Kamandan, Lorestan
