= Quzlijeh =

Quzlijeh (Persian: قوزليجه) may refer to:

- Quzlijeh, Hamadan
- Quzlijeh, Razan, Hamadan Province
