= Qaraylar =

Qaraylar also spelled Karaylar, Qarailar, Karailar (from Ottoman Turkish: قرايلر) is a plural form of Qaray, etc. It may refer to:

- Crimean Karaites, known in Crimean Tatar language as Qaraylar
- Qaraylar, Iran, a village in Hamadan Province
- Qarai Turks
