= Qizjeh =

Qizjeh (Persian: قيزجه) may refer to:

- Qizjeh, East Azerbaijan
- Qizjeh, Zanjan
