= Qezlijeh =

Qezlijeh (Persian: قزليجه) may refer to:

- Qezlijeh, Hamadan
- Qezlijeh, Markazi
