= Rabkin =

Surname

Rabkin is a toponymic surname derived from the village of Ryabki, in Belarus.

- David Rabkin (1948–1985) South African Anti-apartheid activist
- Herman "Hesh" Rabkin, fictional character, advisor and friend to Tony Soprano in the HBO series The Sopranos
- Jeremy A. Rabkin (born 1952), professor of law at George Mason University School of Law
- Leo Rabkin, American artist
- William Rabkin, American television producer, television writer and author
- Yakov M. Rabkin, professor of history at the Université de Montréal, author and public intellectual

== See also ==
- Rabin
- Rabkrin
- Rakin (disambiguation)
