= Quzlijeh, Razan =

Quzlijeh قوزليجه
- Village
- Location within Iran
- Coordinates: 35°24′49″N 48°52′23″E
- Country: Iran
- Province: Hamadan
- County: Razan
- Bakhsh: Sardrud
- Rural District: Sardrud-e Sofla

Population (2006)
  - Total: 89
- Time zone: UTC+3:30 (IRST)
  - Summer (DST): UTC+4:30 (IRDT)

Quzlijeh (Persian: قوزليجه, also Romanized as Qūzlījeh; also known as Qezlījeh) is a village in Sardrud-e Sofla Rural District, Sardrud District, Razan County, Hamadan Province, Iran. At the 2006 census, its population was 89, in 22 families.
