= Sardrud-e Olya Rural District =

Rural district in Hamadan province, Iran

Sardrud-e Olya Rural District Persian: دهستان سردرود عليا
- Rural District
- Location within Iran
- Coordinates: 35°36′N 48°48′E
- Country: Iran
- Province: Hamadan
- County: Razan
- District: Sardrud
- Established: 1987
- Capital: Khvorvandeh

Population (2016)
  - Total: 11,856
- Time zone: UTC+3:30 (IRST)

Sardrud-e Olya Rural District (Persian: دهستان سردرود عليا) is in Sardrud District of Razan County, Hamadan province, Iran. Its capital is the village of Khvorvandeh.

== Demographics ==
=== Population ===
At the time of the 2006 National Census, the rural district's population was 11,354 in 2,478 households. There were 12,055 inhabitants in 3,203 households at the following census of 2011. The 2016 census measured the population of the rural district a 11,856 in 3,455 households. The most populous of its 13 villages was Molla Bodagh, with 3,210 people.

=== Other villages in the rural district ===
- Aqcheh Kharabeh
- Arpa Darreh
- Chopoqlu
- Gav Savar
- Kahriz-e Boqazi
- Mansurabad
- Ojaq
- Qarah Bolagh
- Takht
