= Damaq =

City in Hamadan province, Iran

Damaq Persian: دمق
- City
- Location within Iran
- Coordinates: 35°26′33″N 48°49′19″E
- Country: Iran
- Province: Hamadan
- County: Razan
- District: Sardrud

Population (2016)
  - Total: 3,231
- Time zone: UTC+3:30 (IRST)

Damaq (Persian: دمق) (Note: Also known as Damagh) is a city in, and the capital of, Sardrud District in Razan County, Hamadan province, Iran. It also serves as the administrative center for Sardrud-e Sofla Rural District.

== Demographics ==
=== Population ===
At the time of the 2006 National Census, the city's population was 2,847 in 757 households. The following census in 2011 counted 3,783 people in 936 households. The 2016 census measured the population of the city as 3,231 people in 987 households.
