= Rakin =

Rakin or Rokin (Persian: ركين) may refer to:

- Rakin, Hamadan, a village in Iran
- Rakin, Markazi, a village in Iran
- Rakin Ahmed (born 1993), Bangladeshi cricketer
- Rakin Fetuga (born 1971), English rapper and music producer
