= Qinarjeh, Shahin Dezh =

Qinarjeh قينرجه
- Village
- Location within Iran
- Coordinates: 36°53′17″N 46°39′17″E
- Country: Iran
- Province: West Azerbaijan
- County: Shahin Dezh
- Bakhsh: Keshavarz
- Rural District: Chaharduli

Population (2006)
  - Total: 201
- Time zone: UTC+3:30 (IRST)
  - Summer (DST): UTC+4:30 (IRDT)

Qinarjeh (Persian: قينرجه, also Romanized as Qīnarjeh; also known as Qanbarjeh) is a village in Chaharduli Rural District, Keshavarz District, Shahin Dezh County, West Azerbaijan Province, Iran. At the 2006 census, its population was 201, in 42 families.
