= Qinarjeh-ye Olya =

Qinarjeh-ye Olya قينرجه عليا
- Village
- Location within Iran
- Coordinates: 37°01′47″N 47°08′28″E
- Country: Iran
- Province: East Azerbaijan
- County: Charuymaq
- Bakhsh: Shadian
- Rural District: Charuymaq-e Jonubesharqi

Population (2006)
  - Total: 69
- Time zone: UTC+3:30 (IRST)
  - Summer (DST): UTC+4:30 (IRDT)

Qinarjeh-ye Olya (Persian: قينرجه عليا, also Romanized as Qīnarjeh-ye ‘Olyā; also known as Qanīzjeh-ye ‘Olyā) is a village in Charuymaq-e Jonubesharqi Rural District, Shadian District, Charuymaq County, East Azerbaijan Province, Iran. At the 2006 census, its population was 69, in 13 families.
