= Qinarjeh-ye Sofla =

Qinarjeh-ye Sofla قينرجه سفلي
- Village
- Location within Iran
- Coordinates: 37°01′53″N 47°08′42″E
- Country: Iran
- Province: East Azerbaijan
- County: Charuymaq
- Bakhsh: Shadian
- Rural District: Charuymaq-e Jonubesharqi

Population (2006)
  - Total: 100
- Time zone: UTC+3:30 (IRST)
  - Summer (DST): UTC+4:30 (IRDT)

Qinarjeh-ye Sofla (Persian: قينرجه سفلي, also Romanized as Qīnarjeh-ye Soflá; also known as Qanīzjeh-ye Soflá) is a village in Charuymaq-e Jonubesharqi Rural District, Shadian District, Charuymaq County, East Azerbaijan Province, Iran. At the 2006 census, its population was 100, in 17 families.
