= Qinarjeh, Kurdistan =

Qinarjeh قينرجه
- Village
- Location within Iran
- Coordinates: 36°15′47″N 47°28′09″E
- Country: Iran
- Province: Kurdistan
- County: Bijar
- Bakhsh: Korani
- Rural District: Taghamin

Population (2006)
  - Total: 52
- Time zone: UTC+3:30 (IRST)
  - Summer (DST): UTC+4:30 (IRDT)

Qinarjeh (Persian: قينرجه, also Romanized as Qīnarjeh) is a village in Taghamin Rural District, Korani District, Bijar County, Kurdistan Province, Iran. At the 2006 census, its population was 52, in 12 families. The village is populated by Azerbaijanis.
