= Saroleh, Khuzestan =

Village in Khuzestan Province, Iran with 1,027 people

Saroleh سرله
- Village
- Location within Iran
- Coordinates: 31°21′11″N 49°51′23″E
- Country: Iran
- Province: Khuzestan
- County: Bagh-e Malek
- Bakhsh: Meydavud
- Rural District: Saroleh

Population (2006)
  - Total: 1,027
- Time zone: UTC+3:30 (IRST)
  - Summer (DST): UTC+4:30 (IRDT)

Saroleh (Persian: سرله, also Romanized as Sarelah; also known as Sarileh, Sarleh, Sarolan) is a village in Saroleh Rural District, Meydavud District, Bagh-e Malek County, Khuzestan Province, Iran. At the 2006 census, its population was 1,027, in 221 families.
