= Souad Dibi =

Moroccan ativist

Souad Dibi is a Moroccan feminist activist, president of the association El Khir (in English : charity) based in Essaouira, and whose object is to provide economic independence to women by promoting their professional integration. Each year more than one hundred women follow an education program designed to provide them with the skills in a domain generating revenues (cooking, care, room service). This region of the Moroccan Atlantic coast is a tourist area, but also demonstrates for young people and women a poverty rate of 30% (National Initiative for human development).

== Biography ==
Souad Dibi was born in El Jadida, near Casablanca, and married a carpenter from the Moroccan coast. She was a seamstress before setting up her association. Dibi founded El Khir in 1998 for the Essaouira women abandoned and without any resources for living.

She was invited to the SIGEF (Social Innovation and Global Ethics Forum) organized by Horyou in 2015 in Geneva. An interim agency, MS INTERIM puts women who benefited from the associative qualifying courses in touch with professionals looking for skilled employees. In March 2015 for the International Women's Day she published Un art qui fait vivre, a book of Moroccan cooking created within the association, telling the story of a group of women who managed to change their lives thanks to their mastering of culinary skills.

== El Khir ==
Founded by Dibi in 1998, El Khiris an Essaouira-based NGO that promotes women's rights through legal support, psychological support, professional integration, and fight against violence. Each year, due to this association's work, dozens of women obtain professional training and can benefit from financial autonomy. Souad Dibi has summarized the situation faced by many in Morocco: “many women experience dramatic situations within their families: abandonment, mistreatment, dependence on their husbands. We help them understand that the best way to assert themselves is to achieve autonomy.”
