= Qizcheh =

Qizcheh قيزچه
- Village
- Location within Iran
- Coordinates: 37°14′01″N 46°35′50″E
- Country: Iran
- Province: East Azerbaijan
- County: Maragheh
- Bakhsh: Saraju
- Rural District: Quri Chay-ye Gharbi

Population (2006)
  - Total: 21
- Time zone: UTC+3:30 (IRST)
  - Summer (DST): UTC+4:30 (IRDT)

Qizcheh (Persian: قيزچه, also Romanized as Qīzcheh; also known as Qīnarcheh, Qīnarjeh, and Qīzjeh) is a village in Quri Chay-ye Gharbi Rural District, Saraju District, Maragheh County, East Azerbaijan Province, Iran. At the 2006 census, its population was 21, in 5 families.
