= Qorveh-ye Dargazin =

City in Hamadan province, Iran

Qorveh-ye Dargazin Persian: قروه درگزين
- City
- Location within Iran
- Coordinates: 35°18′32″N 49°06′02″E
- Country: Iran
- Province: Hamadan
- County: Dargazin
- District: Central

Population (2016)
  - Total: 9,540
- Time zone: UTC+3:30 (IRST)

Qorveh-ye Dargazin (Persian: قروه درگزين) (Note: Formerly known as Qorveh-ye Darjazin (قروه درجزين)) is a city in the Central District of Dargazin County, Hamadan province, Iran, serving as capital of both the county and the district. The area is inhabited by the Shia Qaragozlu tribe.

== Demographics ==
=== Population ===
At the time of the 2006 National Census, the city's population was 9,335 in 2,456 households, when it was capital of the former Qorveh-ye Darjazin District in Razan County. The following census in 2011 counted 10,231 people in 2,925 households. The 2016 census measured the population of the city as 9,540 people in 2,973 households.

In 2019, the district was separated from the county in the establishment of Dargazin County. Qorveh-ye Dargazin was transferred to the new Central District as the county's capital and renamed Qorveh-ye Darjazin.
