= Dargazin-e Sofla Rural District =

Rural district in Hamadan province, Iran

Dargazin-e Sofla Rural District Persian: دهستان درگزین سفلی
- Rural District
- Location within Iran
- Coordinates: 35°20′N 49°04′E
- Country: Iran
- Province: Hamadan
- County: Dargazin
- District: Central
- Established: 1987
- Capital: Dargazin

Population (2016)
  - Total: 13,067
- Time zone: UTC+3:30 (IRST)

Dargazin-e Sofla Rural District (Persian: دهستان درگزین سفلی) (Note: Formerly Darjazin-e Sofla Rural District (دهستان درجزين سفلی)) is in the Central District of Dargazin County, Hamadan province, Iran. Its capital is the village of Dargazin. (Note: Formerly known as Darjazin)

== Demographics ==
=== Population ===
At the time of the 2006 National Census, the rural district's population (as Darjazin-e Sofla Rural District of the former Qorveh-ye Darjazin District in Razan County) was 13,617 in 3,321 households. There were 13,486 inhabitants in 3,925 households at the following census of 2011. The 2016 census measured the population of the rural district as 13,067 in 4,062 households. The most populous of its 17 villages was Omman (now in Dargazin-e Gharbi Rural District), with 2,305 people.

In 2019, the district was separated from the county in the establishment of Dargazin County. The rural district was transferred to the new Central District and renamed Dargazin-e Sofla Rural District.

=== Other villages in the rural district ===
- Ahmadabad
- Dowlujerdin-e Bala
- Hakan
- Kamandan
- Niyar
- Now Deh
- Poshtjin
- Silak
- Zakan
