= Sardrud-e Sofla Rural District =

Rural district in Hamadan province, Iran

Sardrud-e Sofla Rural District Persian: دهستان سردرود سفلي
- Rural District
- Location within Iran
- Coordinates: 35°25′N 48°52′E
- Country: Iran
- Province: Hamadan
- County: Razan
- District: Sardrud
- Established: 1987
- Capital: Damaq

Population (2016)
  - Total: 7,930
- Time zone: UTC+3:30 (IRST)

Sardrud-e Sofla Rural District (Persian: دهستان سردرود سفلي) is in Sardrud District of Razan County, Hamadan province, Iran. It is administered from the city of Damaq.

== Demographics ==
=== Population ===
At the time of the 2006 National Census, the rural district's population was 8,694 in 2,009 households. There were 8,804 inhabitants in 2,395 households at the following census of 2011. The 2016 census measured the population of the rural district as 7,930 in 2,378 households. The most populous of its 18 villages was Soltanabad, with 1,556 people.

=== Other villages in the rural district ===
- Chayan
- Kal Kabud
- Khanjarabad
- Pileh Jin
- Qaleh-ye Shater Bali
- Qayesh
- Tulki Tappeh
