= Boghrati Rural District =

Rural district in Hamadan province, Iran

Boghrati Rural District Persian: دهستان بغراطي
- Rural District
- Location within Iran
- Coordinates: 35°26′N 48°43′E
- Country: Iran
- Province: Hamadan
- County: Razan
- District: Boghrati
- Established: 1987
- Capital: Tappeh-ye Dibi

Population (2016)
  - Total: 13,948
- Time zone: UTC+3:30 (IRST)

Boghrati Rural District (Persian: دهستان بغراطي) is in Boghrati District of Razan County, Hamadan province, Iran. Its capital is the village of Tappeh-ye Dibi. The previous capital of the rural district was the village of Baba Nazar.

== Demographics ==
=== Population ===
At the time of the 2006 National Census, the rural district's population (as a part of Sardrud District) was 15,824 in 3,402 households. There were 15,981 inhabitants in 3,959 households at the following census of 2011. The 2016 census measured the population of the rural district as 13,948 in 3,791 households. The most populous of its 14 villages was Baba Nazar, with 3,255 people.

In 2023, the rural district was separated from the district in the formation of Boghrati District.

=== Other villages in the rural district ===
- Churmaq
- Qader Khalaj
- Qaleh-ye Zendlij
- Qarakand
