= Dargazin-e Olya Rural District =

Rural district in Hamadan province, Iran

Dargazin-e Olya Rural District Persian: دهستان درگزین علیا
- Rural District
- Location within Iran
- Coordinates: 35°21′N 49°18′E
- Country: Iran
- Province: Hamadan
- County: Dargazin
- District: Shahanjarin
- Established: 1987
- Capital: Shavand

Population (2016)
  - Total: 14,392
- Time zone: UTC+3:30 (IRST)

Dargazin-e Olya Rural District (Persian: دهستان درگزین علیا) (Note: Formerly Darjazin-e Olya Rural District (دهستان درجزين علیا)) is in Shahanjarin District of Dargazin County, Hamadan province, Iran. Its capital is the village of Shavand. The previous capital of the rural district was the village of Changarin, now the city of Shahanjarin.

== Demographics ==
=== Population ===
At the time of the 2006 National Census, the rural district's population (as Darjazin-e Olya Rural District of the former Qorveh-ye Darjazin District in Razan County) was 16,900 in 4,065 households. There were 16,536 inhabitants in 4,708 households at the following census of 2011. The 2016 census measured the population of the rural district as 14,392 in 4,591 households. The most populous of its 30 villages was Karafs (now a city), with 4,155 people.

In 2019, the district was separated from the county in the establishment of Dargazin County. The rural district was transferred to the new Shahanjarin District and renamed Dargazin-e Olya Rural District.

=== Other villages in the rural district ===
- Eynabad
- Javar Sajin
- Manuchehr
- Nakin
- Poli Kan
- Qaraqiyeh
- Sang Garan Kuh
- Sonqorabad
- Yengejeh-ye Karafs
