= Boghrati District =

District in Hamadan province, Iran

Boghrati District Persian: بخش بغراطی
- District
- Location within Iran
- Coordinates: 35°27′N 48°41′E
- Country: Iran
- Province: Hamadan
- County: Razan
- Established: 2023
- Capital: Baba Nazar
- Time zone: UTC+3:30 (IRST)

Boghrati District (Persian: بخش بغراطی) is in Razan County, Hamadan province, Iran. Its capital is the village of Baba Nazar, whose population at the time of the 2016 National Census was 3,255 people in 832 households.

== History ==
In 2023, Boghrati Rural District was separated from Sardrud District in the formation of Boghrati District.

== Demographics ==
=== Administrative divisions ===
Boghrati District
Administrative Divisions
Boghrati RD
Qeynarjeh RD
RD = Rural District
