= Central District (Dargazin County) =

District in Hamadan province, Iran

Central District (Dargazin County) Persian: بخش مرکزی شهرستان درگزین
- District
- Location within Iran
- Coordinates: 35°20′19″N 49°05′18″E
- Country: Iran
- Province: Hamadan
- County: Dargazin
- Capital: Qorveh-ye Dargazin
- Time zone: UTC+3:30 (IRST)

The Central District of Dargazin County (Persian: بخش مرکزی شهرستان درگزین) is in Hamadan province, Iran. Its capital is the city of Qorveh-ye Dargazin, (Note: Formerly Qorveh-ye Darjazin) whose population at the time of the 2016 National Census was 9,540 people in 2,973 households.

== History ==
After the 2016 census, Qorveh-ye Darjazin District was separated from Razan County in the establishment of Dargazin County, which was divided into two districts of two rural districts each, with Qorveh-ye Dargazin as its capital.

== Demographics ==
=== Administrative divisions ===
Central District (Dargazin County)
Administrative Divisions
Dargazin-e Gharbi RD
Dargazin-e Sofla RD (Note: Formerly Darjazin-e Sofla Rural District)
Qorveh-ye Dargazin (city)
RD = Rural District
