= Shahanjarin District =

District in Hamadan province, Iran

Shahanjarin District Persian: بخش شاهنجرین
- District
- Location within Iran
- Coordinates: 35°21′N 49°18′E
- Country: Iran
- Province: Hamadan
- County: Dargazin
- Established: 2019
- Capital: Shahanjarin
- Time zone: UTC+3:30 (IRST)

Shahanjarin District (Persian: بخش شاهنجرین) is in Dargazin County, Hamadan province, Iran. Its capital is the city of Shahanjarin, whose population at the time of the 2016 National Census was 1,584 people in 597 households.

== History ==
The village of Karafs was converted to a city in 2018. In 2019, Qorveh-ye Darjazin District was separated from Razan County in the establishment of Dargazin County, which was divided into two districts of two rural districts each, with the city of Qorveh-ye Dargazin (Note: Formerly known as Qorveh-ye Darjazin) as its capital. The village of Shahanjarin was converted to a city in 2023. (Note: Formerly the village of Changarin)

== Demographics ==
=== Administrative divisions ===
Shahanjarin District
Administrative Divisions
Dargazin-e Olya RD (Note: Formerly Darjazin-e Olya Rural District)
Dargazin-e Sharqi RD
Karafs (city) (Note: Became a city after the 2016 census)
Shahanjarin (city) (Note: Became a city after the 2016 census)
RD = Rural District
