= Sardrud District =

District in Hamadan province, Iran

Sardrud District Persian: بخش سردرود
- District
- Location within Iran
- Coordinates: 35°32′N 48°49′E
- Country: Iran
- Province: Hamadan
- County: Razan
- Capital: Damaq

Population (2016)
  - Total: 36,965
- Time zone: UTC+3:30 (IRST)

Sardrud District (Persian: بخش سردرود) is in Razan County, Hamadan province, Iran. Its capital is the city of Damaq.

== History ==
In 2023, Boghrati Rural District was separated from the district in the formation of Boghrati District.

== Demographics ==
=== Population ===
At the time of the 2006 National Census, the district's population was 38,719 in 8,646 households. The following census in 2011 counted 40,623 people in 10,493 households. The 2016 census measured the population of the district as 36,965 inhabitants in 10,611 households.

=== Administrative divisions ===
Sardrud District Population
Administrative Divisions	2006	2011	2016
Boghrati RD (Note: Transferred to Boghrati District after the 2016 census)	15,824	15,981	13,948
Sardrud-e Olya RD	11,354	12,055	11,856
Sardrud-e Sofla RD	8,694	8,804	7,930
Damaq (city)	2,847	3,783	3,231
Total	38,719	40,623	36,965
RD = Rural District
