= Dargazin County =

County in Hamadan province, Iran

Dargazin County Persian: شهرستان درگزین
- County
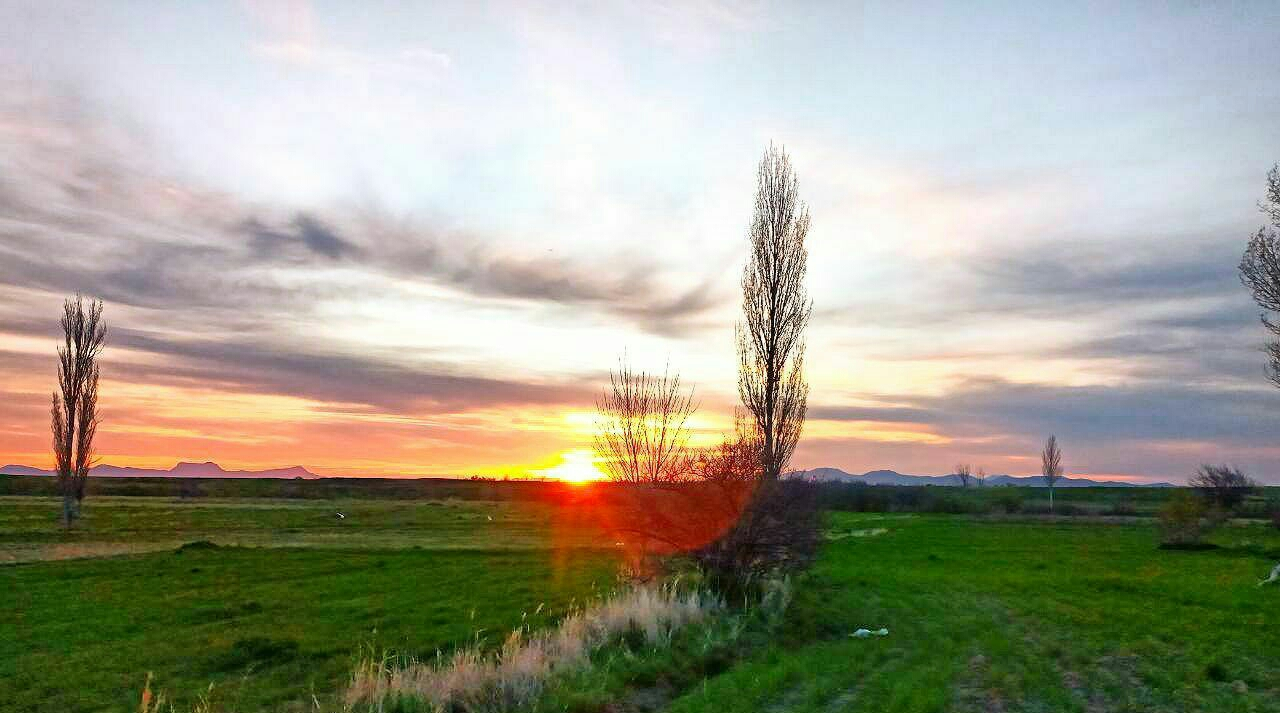
- Landscape in Dargazin County

- Location of Dargazin County in Hamadan province (top, pink)

- Location of Hamadan province in Iran
- Coordinates: 35°21′N 49°15′E
- Country: Iran
- Province: Hamadan
- Established: 2019
- Capital: Qorveh-ye Dargazin
- Districts: Central, Shahanjarin
- Time zone: UTC+3:30 (IRST)

Dargazin County (Persian: شهرستان درگزین) is in Hamadan province, Iran. Its capital is the city of Qorveh-ye Dargazin, (Note: Formerly Qorveh-ye Darjazin) whose population at the time of the 2016 National Census was 9,540 people in 2,973 households.

== History ==
The village of Karafs was converted to a city in 2018. In 2019, Qorveh-ye Darjazin District was separated from Razan County in the establishment of Dargazin County, which was divided into two districts of two rural districts each, with the city of Qorveh-ye Dargazin as its capital. The village of Shahanjarin was converted to a city in 2023. (Note: Formerly the village of Changarin)

== Demographics ==
=== Administrative divisions ===
Dargazin County's administrative structure is shown in the following table.

Dargazin County
Administrative Divisions
Central District
Dargazin-e Gharbi RD
Dargazin-e Sofla RD (Note: Formerly Darjazin-e Sofla Rural District)
Qorveh-ye Dargazin (city)
Shahanjarin District
Dargazin-e Olya RD (Note: Formerly Darjazin-e Olya Rural District)
Dargazin-e Sharqi RD
Karafs (city) (Note: Became a city after the 2016 census)
Shahanjarin (city) (Note: Became a city after the 2016 census)
RD = Rural District

== See also ==
Media related to Dargazin County at Wikimedia Commons
