= Qorveh-ye Darjazin District =

Former district in Hamadan province, Iran

Qorveh-ye Darjazin District Persian: بخش قروه درجزين
- Former District
- Location within Iran
- Coordinates: 35°21′N 49°15′E
- Country: Iran
- Province: Hamadan
- County: Razan
- Established: 1993
- Capital: Qorveh-ye Darjazin

Population (2016)
  - Total: 36,999
- Time zone: UTC+3:30 (IRST)

Qorveh-ye Darjazin District (Persian: بخش قروه درجزين) is a former administrative division of Razan County, Hamadan province, Iran. Its capital was the city of Qorveh-ye Darjazin.

== History ==
In 2019, the district was separated from the county in the establishment of Dargazin County.

== Demographics ==
=== Population ===
At the time of the 2006 National Census, the district's population was 39,852 in 9,842 households. The following census in 2011 counted 40,253 people in 11,558 households. The 2016 census measured the population of the district as 36,999 inhabitants in 11,626 households.

=== Administrative divisions ===
Qorveh-ye Darjazin District Population
Administrative Divisions	2006	2011	2016
Darjazin-e Olya RD (Note: Renamed Dargazin-e Olya Rural District)	16,900	16,536	14,392
Darjazin-e Sofla RD (Note: Renamed Dargazin-e Sofla Rural District)	13,617	13,486	13,067
Qorveh-ye Darjazin (city) (Note: Renamed Qorveh-ye Dargazin)	9,335	10,231	9,540
Total	39,852	40,253	36,999
RD = Rural District
