= Razan County =

County in Hamadan province, Iran

Razan County Persian: شهرستان رزن
- County
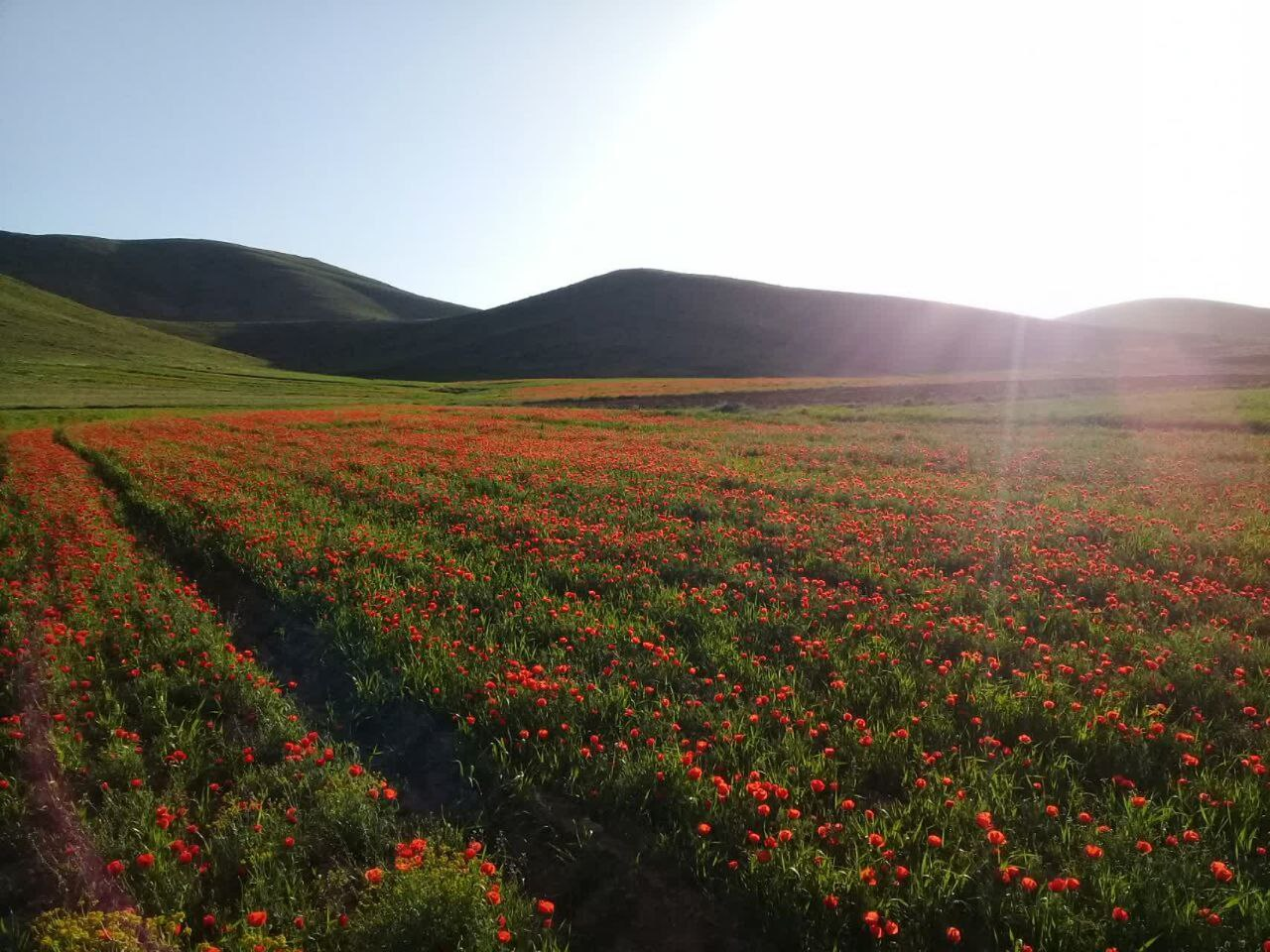
- Dasht-e Razan in the spring

- Location of Razan County in Hamadan province (top, green)

- Location of Hamadan province in Iran
- Coordinates: 35°28′N 48°53′E
- Country: Iran
- Province: Hamadan
- Established: 1993
- Capital: Razan
- Districts: Central, Boghrati, Sardrud

Population (2016)
  - Total: 107,587
- Time zone: UTC+3:30 (IRST)

Razan County (Persian: شهرستان رزن) is in Hamadan province, Iran. Its capital is the city of Razan.

== History ==
In 2019, Qorveh-ye Darjazin District was separated from the county in the formation of Dargazin County. In 2023, Boghrati Rural District was separated from Sardrud District in the formation of Boghrati District, including the new Qeynarjeh Rural District.

== Demographics ==
=== Population ===
At the time of the 2006 National Census, the county's population was 111,120 in 26,277 households. The following census in 2011 counted 116,437 people in 31,598 households. The 2016 census measured the population of the county as 107,587 in 32,207 households.

=== Administrative divisions ===
Razan County's population history and administrative structure over three consecutive censuses are shown in the following table.

Razan County Population
Administrative Divisions	2006	2011	2016
Central District	32,549	35,561	33,623
Kharqan RD	5,605	5,263	4,776
Razan RD	15,554	16,587	14,572
Razan (city)	11,390	13,711	14,275
Boghrati District (Note: Established after the 2016 census)			
Boghrati RD			
Qeynarjeh RD			
Qorveh-ye Darjazin District (Note: Transferred to Dargazin County)	39,852	40,253	36,999
Darjazin-e Olya RD (Note: Renamed Dargazin-e Olya Rural District)	16,900	16,536	14,392
Darjazin-e Sofla RD (Note: Renamed Dargazin-e Sofla Rural District)	13,617	13,486	13,067
Qorveh-ye Darjazin (city) (Note: Renamed Qorveh-ye Dargazin)	9,335	10,231	9,540
Sardrud District	38,719	40,623	36,965
Boghrati RD	15,824	15,981	13,948
Sardrud-e Olya RD	11,354	12,055	11,856
Sardrud-e Sofla RD	8,694	8,804	7,930
Damaq (city)	2,847	3,783	3,231
Total	111,120	116,437	107,587
RD = Rural District

== See also ==
Media related to Razan County at Wikimedia Commons
