= 2026 Pasteur Institute of Iran airstrikes =

- Part of 2026 Iran war
- Type: Airstrikes
- Location: Tehran, Iran
- Target: Pasteur Institute of Iran
- Date: 2 April 2026
- Executed by: USA Israel
- Outcome: ~100% of the institute's structures sustained damage; 3000 billion Tomans in damage
- Casualties: None

On 2 April, 2026, the Pasteur Institute of Iran was struck by multiple bombs as part of the 2026 Iran war. The attacks, conducted by the United States and Israel, destroyed several buildings and damaged equipment and laboratories, disrupting operations.

== Background ==
Attacks on schools and hospitals during conflict is one of the six grave violations identified and condemned by the UN Security Council. However, there were instances in Iran War 2026 where medical institutions and higher education institutions were attacked mainly by airstrikes, including Pasteur Institute of Iran.

== Damage ==
Mohammad-Reza Zafarghandi, Minister of Health and Medical Education stated the damage equivalent to 3000 billion Tomans (more than US$20 million).

== Reactions ==
- International health organizations, including the World Health Organization (WHO), expressed concern over reported damage to healthcare and biomedical infrastructure in Iran during the same period. Media reports indicated that the institute was among several scientific and medical facilities impacted.
- The attack in different international media outlets were described as "One of the greatest tragedies of the Iran war" and "a hit on one century of medical history of Iran”.

== See also ==
- Pasteur Institute of Iran
- 2026 Iran University of Science and Technology airstrikes
