= Sorkhab =

Sorkhab (Persian: سرخاب) may refer to:

- Sorkhab, Alborz, Iran
- Sorkhab, Ardabil, Iran
- Sorkhab, Hamadan, Iran
- Sorkhab, West Azerbaijan

== See also ==
- Surkhab (disambiguation)
