= Beshik Tappeh =

Village in Hamadan province, Iran

Beshik Tappeh Persian: بشيكتپه
- Village
- Location within Iran
- Coordinates: 35°32′10″N 48°25′05″E
- Country: Iran
- Province: Hamadan
- County: Kabudarahang
- District: Shirin Su
- Rural District: Shirin Su

Population (2016)
  - Total: 803
- Time zone: UTC+3:30 (IRST)

Beshik Tappeh (Persian: بشيكتپه) (Note: Also romanized as Beshīk Tappeh; also known as Besh Tappeh, Besh Tepe, Peshik Tapeh, Peshīk Tappeh, and Pishik Tapeh) is a village in Shirin Su Rural District of Shirin Su District in Kabudarahang County, Hamadan province, Iran.

== Demographics ==
=== Population ===
At the time of the 2006 National Census, the village's population was 950 in 185 households. The following census in 2011 counted 1,027 people in 283 households. The 2016 census measured the population of the village as 803 people in 262 households.
