= Shirin Su Rural District =

Shirin Su Rural District (Persian: دهستان شيرين سو) may refer to:

- Shirin Su Rural District (Hamadan Province)
- Shirin Su Rural District (North Khorasan Province)
