= Aqdash, Shirin Su =

Village in Hamadan province, Iran

Aqdash Persian: اقداش
- Village
- Location within Iran
- Coordinates: 35°38′53″N 48°08′26″E
- Country: Iran
- Province: Hamadan
- County: Kabudarahang
- District: Shirin Su
- Rural District: Mehraban-e Olya

Population (2016)
  - Total: 168
- Time zone: UTC+3:30 (IRST)

Aqdash (Persian: اقداش) (Note: Also romanized as Āqdāsh) is a village in Mehraban-e Olya Rural District of Shirin Su District in Kabudarahang County, Hamadan province, Iran.

== Demographics ==
=== Population ===
At the time of the 2006 National Census, the village's population was 252 in 51 households. The following census in 2011 counted 234 people in 59 households. The 2016 census measured the population of the village as 168 people in 53 households.
