= Hoseynabad-e Baba Khanjar =

Village in Hamadan province, Iran

Hoseynabad-e Baba Khanjar Persian: حسين ابادباباخنجر
- Village
- Location within Iran
- Coordinates: 35°33′39″N 48°31′52″E
- Country: Iran
- Province: Hamadan
- County: Kabudarahang
- District: Shirin Su
- Rural District: Shirin Su

Population (2016)
  - Total: 408
- Time zone: UTC+3:30 (IRST)

Hoseynabad-e Baba Khanjar (Persian: حسين ابادباباخنجر) (Note: Also romanized as Ḩoseynābād-e Bābā Khanjar; also known as Hasanābād, Hosein Abad Mehraban, Ḩoseynābād, and Husainābād) is a village in Shirin Su Rural District of Shirin Su District in Kabudarahang County, Hamadan province, Iran.

== Demographics ==
=== Population ===
At the time of the 2006 National Census, the village's population was 417 in 81 households. The following census in 2011 counted 428 people in 110 households. The 2016 census measured the population of the village as 408 people in 127 households.
