= Research Centre for Emerging and Reemerging Infectious Diseases =

Iranian research institute

The Research Centre for Emerging and Reemerging Infectious Diseases is part of the Pasteur Institute of Iran.

It is the National Reference Laboratory for Plague, Tularemia, and Q Fever.

== The history of the foundation of Pasteur Institute of Iran ==
One year after World War I and despite the persistent problems caused by casualties and infectious diseases in the country resulting from war, the Iranian government decided to renew its relationship with France to promote medical sciences and research concerning different types of endemic infectious diseases. The Iranian delegates met Pierre Paul Émile Roux, the general director of the Pasteur Institute of Paris, in 1919 and this visit laid the foundation of Pasteur Institute of Iran.

On 20 January 1921, Professor René Legroux, the leading delegate of the Pasteur Institute of Paris, signed a memorandum of understanding with the minister for foreign affairs of Iran and as a result, Pasteur Institute of Iran was established. Pasteur Institute of Iran was the tenth Pasteur Institute formed worldwide. Moreover, Pasteur Institute of Iran formally started its activity on 23 August 1921. Due to World War II, the relationship between the Pasteur Institutes in Iran and Paris was interrupted (from 1939 to 1945). Before the war, when the number of laboratories was limited and their activities failed to meet the needs of the country, most of the national health issues related to the ministry of health were addressed by Pasteur Institute of Iran.

== The history of plague in Iran ==
Iranian physicians were familiar with the human plague for a long time. Although there is little information about the situation of plague from earlier centuries, we have more documented evidence from the 19th and 20th centuries. During the Qajar dynasty (1895 to 1925), cholera and plague were the most frequently documented outbreaks. Such lethal diseases were not hard to imagine considering the poor hygiene and lack of knowledge about the root of transmission, prevention and effective treatment of that time. Several plague outbreaks took place during the Qajar dynasty in Iran. In 1871, a severe form of plague outbreak happened in Saghez and Bane (two cities in Kurdistan province) and the Iranian and non-Iranian physicians, such as Dr. Johan Louis Schlimmer, the instructor in the Darolfonun School, were appointed to control this disease. Dr. Schlimmer noted his observations in his book, "Schlimmer's Terminology", published in 1874. The first Iranian physician who registered his observations about plague using modern medical science was Mohammad Razi Tabatabai, the senior physician in Naser al-Din Shah's army; his book was published under the title "Plague" in 1875. Dr. Joseph Desire Tholozan, (1820 to 1897), the royal physician of Naser Al-din Shah and the head of the ministry of health at that time, evaluated the main and natural foci of plague in Kurdistan between 1870 and 1882 and found certain foci for the disease in various villages of that area.

== Akanlu and plague ==
In 1946, together with the new program of activities of Pasteur Institute of Iran, the epidemiology department of Pasteur Institute of Iran started its activities under the supervision of Dr. Baltazard, the general director of the institute. They started their mission in Northwest of Iran and attempted to prepare an epidemiological map of infectious diseases of the country using a portable laboratory in a truck. It later became more practical after they were equipped with professional cars. Although Kurdistan had a history of plague, it was due to the plague outbreak in Kurdistan in the same year that for the first time the research teams were dispatched to an area in which they could control the outbreak via quarantining the foci and epidemiological procedures on the humans and rodents. Studies of the plague foci in this region and the importance of this disease motivated Dr. Baltazard, Dr. Shamsa, Dr. Karimi, Dr. Habibi, Dr. Bahmanyar, Dr. Agha Eftekhari, Dr. Farhang Azad, Dr. Seyyedian and Dr. Majd Teymouri to conduct extensive scientific and epidemiologic studies after educating expert technicians and providing sufficient facilities.

During the nine plague outbreaks in Kurdistan and Azerbaijan between 1946 and 1965, many infected people survived from the disease by the efforts of the dispatched teams of Pasteur Institute of Iran; however, 156 died. In 1952, the first plague laboratory was founded in Akanlu village, near the epicenter of plague in Kurdistan, Iran, on a piece of land bestowed by Manuchehr Gharagozlou, an Iranian friend of Dr. Baltazard. At this research center, currently called "The Research Center for Emerging and Reemerging infectious diseases", Dr. Baltazard and his perseverant colleagues conducted extensive research on plague and established this center as one of the international references for plague. Since 1952, research teams could base themselves in the area for months at a time and conduct detailed research on rodents under more favorable conditions. They were no longer required to carry their equipment throughout their missions. During those years, the integration of field and laboratory collaborations was a key to effective epidemiological actions and led to great research hypotheses. The extensive research by the teams of Pasteur Institute of Iran showed that rodents of the two types Meriones Persicus and Meriones libycus were the main natural reservoirs, unlike their resistance to plague; accordingly, they first proposed that the main reservoir of a disease should be sought amongst the most resistant, not the most sensitive, and such a theory is now accepted as a scientific fact. They also presented their scientific qualifications by publishing several scientific articles. During the development of this research center, many international scientists visited the center, lecturing, studying and/or researching in their fields. In particular, Dr. Xavier Misonne, a Belgian rodentologist who investigated rodent life in Iran and Dr. Jean Marie Klein, an entomologist, who conducted extensive research on fleas in the Akanlu center, played important roles. In addition, the aerial photographs of Kurdistan and Hamadan were obtained from Iran's army and rodents' locations and the infection were mapped and reported and the first foundations of GIS were set. The research team carefully concentrated on the epizootic trend of the region. The achievements of Pasteur Institute of Iran regarding plague research attracted global attention and such a success motivated them to assign Iranians international plague research. The experts and researchers of Pasteur Institute of Iran, known as WHO experts, continued to conduct related research in many neighboring countries such as Turkey, Syria, Iraq and Yemen, Southeast Asia (India, Indonesia, Thailand), Burma, Brazil, and Africa (Zaire, Tanzania); they published all of their research results to be used by others. Most of this research was financially supported by WHO. In 1972, a WHO meeting on plague was held in this center with many participants from all over the world. Although Dr. Baltazard left Iran in 1962, plague studies continued to be conducted in the following years in such a way that in 1978 a new focus of the disease was reported in the Sarab region in Eastern Azerbaijan by Dr. Yunos Karimi and his colleagues.

== Akanlu Centre and research on other emerging and reemerging infectious diseases ==
Pasteur Institute of Iran has been designated to manage the infectious disease situation in Iran and when taking into account all its completed projects, the Research Center for Emerging and Reemerging infectious diseases can be regarded as the pioneer center for field epidemiology in Iran. The Epidemiology Department of Pasteur Institute of Iran and the Akanlu Research Center did researches on tularemia, recurrent fever, rabies and animal bites in addition to plague studies, the main research field of this center. In addition to close collaborations with other departments of the institute such as parasitology and rabies, the epidemiology department and Akanlu Research Center has conducted research in other fields such as hemorrhagic fevers, malaria, cholera and smallpox. T

== Studies related to tularemia ==
One of the other research fields of the Research Center for Emerging and Reemerging infectious diseases has been running researches on tularemia in Iran. Great research by Dr. Shamsa and his colleagues led to the first report of this disease among the domestic livestock and wildlife in Northwest and Eastern Iran. In this study, more than 4500 wild mammals, 200 sheep and cows were traced for the causative agent of tularemia in 47 locations in Iran. As a result, this study greatly contributed to the identification of wild mammals acting as reservoirs for many zoonotic diseases around the country.

The studies about the epidemiology of tularemia continued in the years thereafter as well. The first report of a human case of tularemia was in 1980 in Marivan, southwestern Kurdistan province.

== New period of center’s activity ==
A new period of research activities focused on the center began in 2010. The results of researches in this period were further reports of plague, tularemia and Q fever in Iran. After decades of lack of reporting about these diseases, the surveillance system of these diseases formed again.

=== A -research activities ===
==== A-1 Implementation of research projects ====
Results of carried out research projects managed by this center includes reports on plague in rodents and dogs in the western part of the country, reports on tularemia seropositivity in human high-risk groups in Kurdistan and Sistan and Baluchestan provinces and the first report of endocarditis case of Q fever in Tehran. In addition, this research center has a close scientific relationship with the national reference laboratory of Arboviruses and viral haemorrhagic fever in Pasteur Institute of Iran to monitor other emerging and reemerging infectious diseases such as Crimean Congo haemorrhagic fever, dengue fever, West Nile fever, Rift Valley fever, etc. To monitor other emerging and reemerging infectious diseases, studies have been done on diseases such as recurrent fever, HIV, tuberculosis and hepatitis.

==== A-2 Published research results in scientific papers ====
Published articles from the center's experts in the field emerging and reemerging infectious diseases are published in papers in international journals.

===== A-3 Collaboration with other related scientific and research centers at home and abroad =====
The center's scientific cooperation is in the form of national and international cooperation:

===== A - 3.1 National cooperation =====
Currently the center has an agreement of collaboration with the Center of Communicable Diseases Control, Hamadan University of Medical Sciences, Rodentology Group of Ferdowsi University of Mashhad, Iranian Association of Microbiology and collaboration with the Tehran University of Medical Sciences and Kurdistan University of Medical Sciences.

===== A - 3.2 International cooperation =====
Scientific development and growth of a new phase of scientific activities were beholden to collaboration with Pasteur Institute of Paris and Pasteur Institute in Madagascar. These two institutes are World Health Organization collaborating centers for plague.

=== (B) Educational activities ===
The center's educational activities are in the form of workshops, implementation of educational courses and internships and apprenticeship courses, guidance and advice for students’ theses and holding journal clubs.

==== B-2 Apprenticeships and internship ====
A standard program is developed for students to successfully complete different apprenticeship courses in related fields at this center.

=== (C) Service activities ===
The following services are performed by the center:

- Investigation and control of emerging and reemerging infectious disease outbreaks through missions around the country
- laboratory services for diagnosis of plague, tularemia and Q fever
- Consultancy to the center for communicable diseases control

==== C-1 Investigation and control of emerging and reemerging infectious disease outbreaks ====
Following the center for communicable diseases control's request, more than 15 missions around the country has been made to control and investigate different outbreaks during the last 3 years.

==== C-2 Diagnostic Laboratory Services ====
In December 2014 this center got the certificate to be the National Reference Laboratory for diagnosis of Plague, Tularemia and Q fever.

==== C-4 Medical Museum ====
In the repair and rebuilding of the center, a museum was established to house the center's documents and historical devices.

== Center staff ==
The Research Center employs 4 faculty members, 13 experts and a caretaker either permanently or temporarily.
