= Aq Kand, Kabudarahang =

Village in Hamadan province, Iran

Aq Kand Persian: اقكند
- Village
- Location within Iran
- Coordinates: 35°29′14″N 48°19′29″E
- Country: Iran
- Province: Hamadan
- County: Kabudarahang
- District: Shirin Su
- Rural District: Shirin Su

Population (2016)
  - Total: 1,386
- Time zone: UTC+3:30 (IRST)

Aq Kand (Persian: اقكند) (Note: Also romanized as Āq Kand and Aqkand; also known as Agh Kand Mehraban) is a village in Shirin Su Rural District of Shirin Su District in Kabudarahang County, Hamadan province, Iran.

== Demographics ==
=== Population ===
At the time of the 2006 National Census, the village's population was 1,286 in 253 households. The following census in 2011 counted 1,581 people in 392 households. The 2016 census measured the population of the village as 1,386 people in 388 households.
