= Surkhab =

Surkhab (Persian: سرخاب), meaning Red river in Persian, may refer to:

== Places ==
- Surkhab (Kabul), a tributary of the Kabul River in Afghanistan
- Kunduz River, Afghanistan, called the Surkhab River in its higher reaches
- Vakhsh River in Tajikistan, also called the Surkhab or Surkhob
- Sorkhab, Hamadan, a village in Iran, also called Surkhab

== Other ==
- Ruddy shelduck, a duck native to India and Pakistan

== See also ==
- Sorkhab (disambiguation)
