= Owzon Darreh =

Village in Hamadan province, Iran

Owzon Darreh Persian: اوزن دره
- Village
- Location within Iran
- Coordinates: 35°32′20″N 48°20′43″E
- Country: Iran
- Province: Hamadan
- County: Kabudarahang
- District: Shirin Su
- Rural District: Mehraban-e Olya

Population (2016)
  - Total: 2,245
- Time zone: UTC+3:30 (IRST)

Owzon Darreh (Persian: اوزن دره) (Note: Also known as Oozondareh, Owzun Darreh, Ozūn Darreh, Ozundarreh, Ozūndarreh, Ūzon Darreh, Uzun Darreh, and Ūzūn Darreh) is a village in Mehraban-e Olya Rural District of Shirin Su District in Kabudarahang County, Hamadan province, Iran.

== Demographics ==
=== Population ===
At the time of the 2006 National Census, the village's population was 2,221 in 466 households. The following census in 2011 counted 2,520 people in 652 households. The 2016 census measured the population of the village as 2,245 people in 620 households, the most populous in its rural district.
