= Chahar Suq, Hamadan =

Village in Hamadan province, Iran

Chahar Suq Persian: چهارسوق
- Village
- Location within Iran
- Coordinates: 35°34′32″N 48°22′28″E
- Country: Iran
- Province: Hamadan
- County: Kabudarahang
- District: Shirin Su
- Rural District: Shirin Su

Population (2016)
  - Total: 427
- Time zone: UTC+3:30 (IRST)

Chahar Suq (Persian: چهارسوق) (Note: Also romanized as Chahār Sūq and Chehār Suq; also known as Chowr Sokh) is a village in Shirin Su Rural District of Shirin Su District in Kabudarahang County, Hamadan province, Iran.

== Demographics ==
=== Population ===
At the time of the 2006 National Census, the village's population was 539 in 109 households. The following census in 2011 counted 560 people in 146 households. The 2016 census measured the population of the village as 427 people in 128 households.
