= Qushjeh =

Village in Hamadan province, Iran

Qushjeh Persian: قوشجه
- Village
- Location within Iran
- Coordinates: 35°39′50″N 48°18′19″E
- Country: Iran
- Province: Hamadan
- County: Kabudarahang
- District: Shirin Su
- Rural District: Mehraban-e Olya

Population (2016)
  - Total: 107
- Time zone: UTC+3:30 (IRST)

Qushjeh (Persian: قوشجه) (Note: Also romanized as Qūshjeh; also known as Ghooshjeh, Khushāja, Qowshājā, Qowshajeh, and Qūshāchā) is a village in Mehraban-e Olya Rural District of Shirin Su District in Kabudarahang County, Hamadan province, Iran.

== Demographics ==
=== Population ===
At the time of the 2006 National Census, the village's population was 167 in 36 households. The following census in 2011 counted 171 people in 45 households. The 2016 census measured the population of the village as 107 people in 34 households.
