= Challu, Hamadan =

Village in Hamadan province, Iran

Challu Persian: چالو
- Village
- Location within Iran
- Coordinates: 35°33′56″N 48°19′27″E
- Country: Iran
- Province: Hamadan
- County: Kabudarahang
- District: Shirin Su
- Rural District: Mehraban-e Olya

Population (2016)
  - Total: 769
- Time zone: UTC+3:30 (IRST)

Challu (Persian: چالو) (Note: Also romanized as Chāllū; formerly known as Chārlī (چارلي); also known as Chāleh and Chālī) is a village in, and the capital of, Mehraban-e Olya Rural District in Shirin Su District of Kabudarahang County, Hamadan province, Iran.

== Demographics ==
=== Population ===
At the time of the 2006 National Census, the village's population was 1,173 in 284 households. The following census in 2011 counted 1,155 people in 334 households. The 2016 census measured the population of the village as 769 people in 256 households.
