= Ab Meshkin =

Village in Hamadan province, Iran

Ab Meshkin Persian: اب مشكين
- Village
- Location within Iran
- Coordinates: 35°36′47″N 48°16′09″E
- Country: Iran
- Province: Hamadan
- County: Kabudarahang
- District: Shirin Su
- Rural District: Mehraban-e Olya

Population (2016)
  - Total: 2,217
- Time zone: UTC+3:30 (IRST)

Ab Meshkin (Persian: اب مشكين) (Note: Also romanized as Āb Meshkīn; also known as Āb-e Meshgīn and Āb-i-Mushkin) is a village in Mehraban-e Olya Rural District of Shirin Su District in Kabudarahang County, Hamadan province, Iran.

== Demographics ==
=== Population ===
At the time of the 2006 National Census, the village's population was 2,113 in 389 households. The following census in 2011 counted 2,311 people in 609 households. The 2016 census measured the population of the village as 2,217 people in 640 households.
