= Iranian Blood Transfusion Organization =

Iranian government agency of blood transfusion

Iranian Blood Transfusion Organization (IBTO)
- سازمان انتقال خون ایران

Agency overview
- Formed: July 31, 1974; 52 years ago
- Type: Government agency
- Jurisdiction: Government of the Islamic Republic of Iran
- Headquarters: Tehran, Iran; 35.7268251°N 51.3684895°E
- Motto: Blood donation, life donation; Share Life, Give Blood
- Agency executive: Ahmad Gharehbaghian, CEO
- Website: en.ibto.ir//

The Iranian Blood Transfusion Organization or acronymly IBTO (Persian: سازمان انتقال خون ایران) is the highest and only decision-making authority in the field of supply and distribution of healthy blood and blood products in Iran. The organization was established during the Pahlavi era, on 31 July 1974.

== History ==
Before 1945, sporadic blood transfusions were performed in different hospitals in Iran, but there is no reliable evidence in this regard. In 1952, the "Army Blood Bank" was established by "Dr. Mohammad Ali Shams" and blood transfusion center of Red Lion and Sun Society was established by "Dr. Ahmad Azhir" and both started to work simultaneously.

In the field of blood products, the "Army Blood Center" from 1961 onwards provided cellular products (dense red blood cells and dense platelets) and plasma (Cryoprecipitate and fresh frozen plasma) to a limited extent, and in the same years in collaboration with the Pasteur Institute of Iran took action to purify blood plasma and prepare its products.

With the establishment of the "Iranian Blood Transfusion Organization" in 1974, several years of efforts were achieved and blood transfusion was legalized in Iran. In fact, before 1974, several centers in Iran with limited facilities in hospitals, the army and the Red Lion and Sun Society were working to provide blood to patients in need, but with the establishment of the "Iranian Blood Transfusion Organization" by Fereydoun Ala in 1975, this system entered a new phase. Professor Fereydoun Ala is the founder of the "Iranian Blood Transfusion Organization" and it can be said that he is the most experienced employee of the Blood Transfusion Organization.

Currently, the "Iranian Blood Transfusion Organization" is the highest and only decision-making authority in the field of supply and distribution of blood and healthy blood products in Iran, and all decisions related to blood products are directly related to this organization.

Initially, all the expenses of this organization were provided from the budget of the whole country in the form of aid. In 1979, after the victory of the Iranian revolution and following a general revision of the country's budget, the Blood Transfusion Organization became a government agency affiliated with the Ministry of Health and became subject to the government's general regulations. With the beginning of the Iran–Iraq War in 1980 and the increasing need for blood in the country, the activities of the organization grew significantly and the need for coordination between all departments related to blood transfusion medicine was evident. Therefore, with the approval of the Islamic Consultative Assembly on 23 May 1984, the "Iranian Blood Transfusion Organization" was announced as the sole custodian of blood supply and blood products in Iran. After the approval of the Articles of Association, to form the executive structure of the organization, three deputies of "production and technical", "research and education", "administration and finance" were designed and implemented. The organization was governed by a five-member High Council composed of experts selected by the Minister of Health, Treatment and Medical Education.

In 1995, the plan of the country's blood supply network was approved and implemented by the Supreme Council. Based on this plan, the "Iranian Blood Transfusion Organization", in the form of nine bases of educational regions, will carry out the programs and responsibilities that are prepared and coordinated in the central headquarters of the organization.

The establishment day of the "Iranian Blood Transfusion Organization" on 31 July 1974, has been registered in the national calendar of Iran as the "National Day of Blood Donation".

Forty-six years after the establishment of the "Iranian Blood Transfusion Organization", Iranians had donated 52 million units of blood in total. At present, the "Iranian Blood Transfusion Organization" has made Iran one of the leading countries in the Eastern Mediterranean region in terms of blood donation index, and with 100% voluntary and unannounced blood donation, it has the first rank in blood donation in this region.

== Activities in the country ==
In 1978, in addition to Tehran, blood transfusion centers were established by the "Iranian Blood Transfusion Organization" in 3 cities of Shiraz, Mashhad and Ahvaz. According to the latest statistics of 2013, all blood transfusion centers, including 124 permanent blood collection centers, 32 collection and processing center and 58 blood transfusion centers, are a total of 214 centers, which operate in 31 provinces of Iran.

At present, the capitals of all the provinces of Iran have blood transfusion centers in which there are test sections for screening on donated blood, preparation of products and quality control. Also, 35 counties of Iran have blood transfusion centers that are equipped with facilities for all product preparation processes and screening tests on every donation unit for infection with Hepatitis B virus, Hepatitis C virus, HIV virus and serological testing for Syphilis and other necessary tests.

== Duties ==
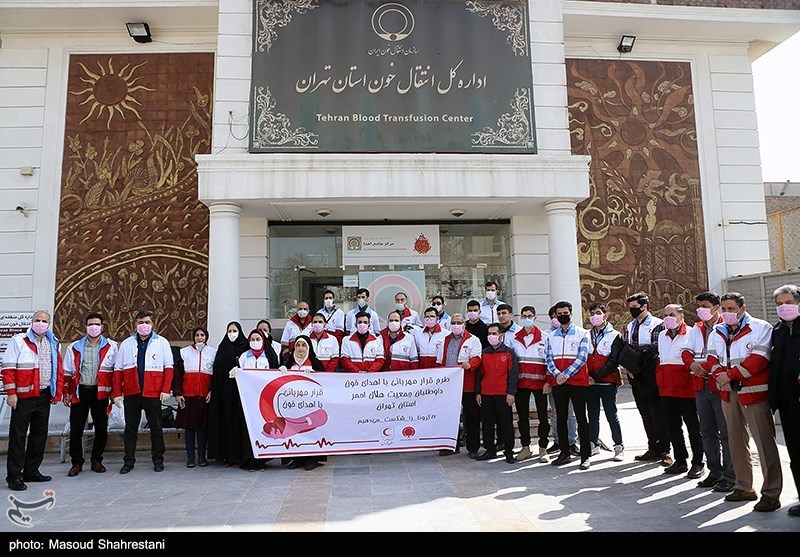
Blood donation by members of the "Iranian Red Crescent Society" in coronavirus crisis at "Tehran Blood Transfusion Center", March 2020

The main duty is to provide adequate blood supply and blood products (cellular and plasma); healthy, with excellent quality to maintain and promote health and improve the quality of life of patients in Iran and hold the superiority of the Eastern Mediterranean region. Other duties include:

- Encourage and collect blood donation volunteers
- Implementing educational programs to make people aware of blood donation
- Expansion of blood supply network throughout the country
- Establishment of mobile units and local bases in different areas of cities for blood collection
- Perform safety tests and grouping to prepare blood and blood products
- Distribution of blood and its products to health centers, hospitals and other organizations and institutions
- Production of various blood products (plasma, cellular and similar) as defined by the Ministry of Health and Medical Education
- Preparation and implementation of educational programs required by the medical group and affiliated medicine within the scope of the organization's duties in accordance with the educational rules and regulations of the country
- Scientific researches in the field of determining and completing appropriate methods for preparation of blood and plasma products, specific researches in the fields of Immunohaematology, Immunochemistry and chemistry of proteins and related fields, and conducting clinical and basic researches
- Tissues grouping for organ transplantation and white blood cell transfer
- Diagnosis of blood coagulation disorders
- Determining the standard conditions for collecting, storing blood and plasma fractions, equipment used, issuing cards and medical conditions allowed for blood donation
- Material and spiritual encouragement of blood and plasma donors for their cooperation and preparation of some products

== Organizational chart ==
Organizational structure of the "Iranian Blood Transfusion Organization" is as follows:

High Council of Iranian Blood Transfusion Organization
Managing Director	High Institute for Research & Education in Transfusion Medicine
Legal Affairs Dept	Public Relations & International Affairs Dept	Performance Evaluation Dept	Security Dept
Management and Resources Development Deputy	Quality Assurance Deputy	Technical & New Technologies Deputy
Financial Affairs Office	Validation Office	Blood Donor Recruitment & Retention Office
Planning & Programming Office	Process Control Office	Reference Laboratories & Surveillance Office
Information Technology Dept	Documentation Control Office	Cord Blood Bank
Medical Equipment Maintenance & Support Office	Quality Control Office	Iranian Stem Cell Donor Registry
Human Resource Administration	Innovation Center
Provincial Centers

== Criteria for blood donation ==
The Iranian Blood Transfusion Organization has defined these criteria for voluntary blood donation:

- Minimum age 18 years and maximum 60 years
- Minimum weight 50 kg
- Blood donation intervals of 56 days with a maximum of four donations per year for men and three donations per year for women
- Having an identity card

== The fate of donated blood ==
The "Iranian Blood Transfusion Organization" use the donated bloods and its products to treat the following:

- Premature children
- Injuries
- Cancers
- Heart diseases
- Problems during childbirth
- Surgeries
- Liver and kidney diseases
- Sickle cell disease
- Leukemia
- Anemia of chronic disease
- Thalassemia major
- Haemophilia

== Facts about blood donation ==
According to the "Iranian Blood Transfusion Organization's" educational brochures:

- 2 out of every 100 people in Iran are blood donors
- Blood cannot be made and the only source of supply is blood donation
- One unit of donated blood can help treat three people
- Treats which needs blood transfusion, requires an average of three units of blood and its product
- Each donor can donate whole blood or other blood components such as plasma, platelets and red blood cells
- Blood and its products have special storage times and conditions. The red blood cell product can usually be stored in the refrigerator temperature for up to 35 days.

== See also ==
- Iranian Red Crescent Society
- Kidney Foundation of Iran
