= Masjedin =

Village in Hamadan province, Iran

Masjedin Persian: مسجدين
- Village
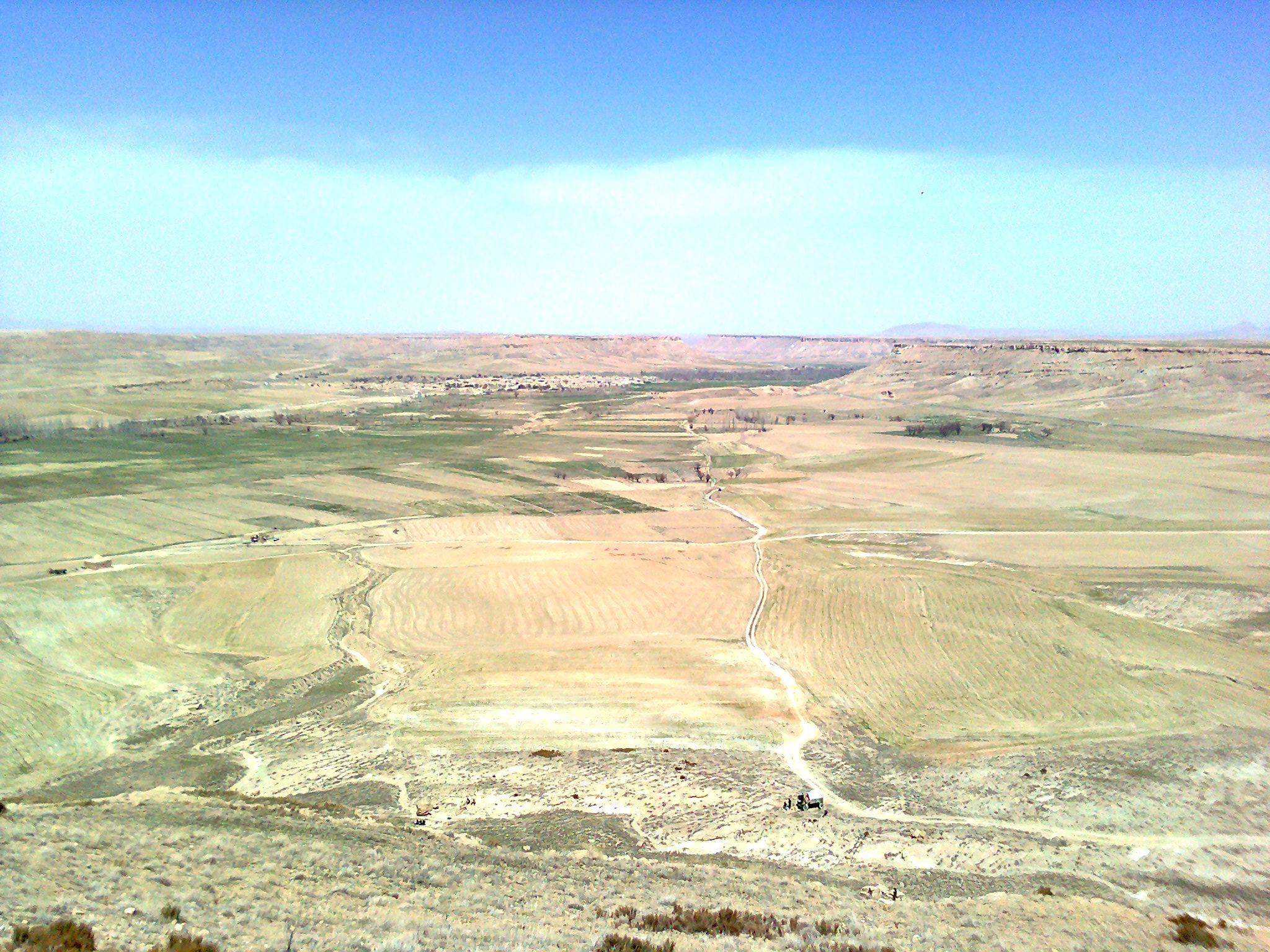
- Landscape near the village of Masjedin

- Location within Iran
- Coordinates: 35°32′37″N 48°15′52″E
- Country: Iran
- Province: Hamadan
- County: Kabudarahang
- District: Shirin Su
- Rural District: Mehraban-e Olya

Population (2016)
  - Total: 1,016
- Time zone: UTC+3:30 (IRST)

Masjedin (Persian: مسجدين) (Note: Also romanized as Masjedeyn and Masjedīn; also known as Masjed, Masjed-e Bālā, Masjed-e ‘Olyā, Masjed-e Pā’īn, Masjedlar, Masjeledler, and Masjīd) is a village in Mehraban-e Olya Rural District of Shirin Su District in Kabudarahang County, Hamadan province, Iran.

== Demographics ==
=== Population ===
At the time of the 2006 National Census, the village's population was 1,873 in 447 households. The following census in 2011 counted 1,714 people in 489 households. The 2016 census measured the population of the village as 1,016 people in 349 households.
