= Abd ol Mowmen =

Village in Hamadan province, Iran

Abd ol Mowmen Persian: عبدالمومن
- Village
- Location within Iran
- Coordinates: 35°25′53″N 48°20′56″E
- Country: Iran
- Province: Hamadan
- County: Kabudarahang
- District: Shirin Su
- Rural District: Shirin Su
- Elevation: 2,478 m (8,130 ft)

Population (2016)
  - Total: 799
- Time zone: UTC+3:30 (IRST)

Abd ol Mowmen (Persian: عبدالمومن) (Note: Also romanized as ‘Abd ol Mo’men and ‘Abd ol Mow’men; also known as ‘Abdol Fūman, Abdul Momin, and Bounna) is a village in Shirin Su Rural District of Shirin Su District in Kabudarahang County, Hamadan province, Iran.

== Demographics ==
=== Population ===
At the time of the 2006 National Census, the village's population was 1,008 in 215 households. The following census in 2011 counted 967 people in 279 households. The 2016 census measured the population of the village as 799 people in 236 households.
