= Bashqurtaran =

Village in Hamadan province, Iran

Bashqurtaran Persian: باشقورتاران
- Village
- Location within Iran
- Coordinates: 35°38′12″N 48°06′59″E
- Country: Iran
- Province: Hamadan
- County: Kabudarahang
- District: Shirin Su
- Rural District: Mehraban-e Olya

Population (2016)
  - Total: 202
- Time zone: UTC+3:30 (IRST)

Bashqurtaran (Persian: باشقورتاران) (Note: Also romanized as Bāsh Qūrtārān and Bāshqūrtārān; also known as Bāsh Qūtrān and Bashgoor Taran) is a village in Mehraban-e Olya Rural District of Shirin Su District in Kabudarahang County, Hamadan province, Iran.

== Demographics ==
=== Population ===
At the time of the 2006 National Census, the village's population was 288 in 54 households. The following census in 2011 counted 198 people in 56 households. The 2016 census measured the population of the village as 202 people in 59 households.
