= Baba Khanjar =

Village in Hamadan province, Iran

Baba Khanjar Persian: باباخنجر
- Village
- Location within Iran
- Coordinates: 35°33′14″N 48°32′56″E
- Country: Iran
- Province: Hamadan
- County: Kabudarahang
- District: Shirin Su
- Rural District: Shirin Su

Population (2016)
  - Total: 1,494
- Time zone: UTC+3:30 (IRST)

Baba Khanjar (Persian: باباخنجر) (Note: Also romanized as Bābā Khanjar) is a village in Shirin Su Rural District of Shirin Su District in Kabudarahang County, Hamadan province, Iran.

== Demographics ==
=== Population ===
At the time of the 2006 National Census, the village's population was 1,669 in 336 households. The following census in 2011 counted 1,690 people in 464 households. The 2016 census measured the population of the village as 1,494 people in 420 households, the most populous in its rural district.
