= Negarabad =

Village in Hamadan province, Iran

Negarabad Persian: نگاراباد
- Village
- Location within Iran
- Coordinates: 35°28′38″N 48°32′02″E
- Country: Iran
- Province: Hamadan
- County: Kabudarahang
- District: Shirin Su
- Rural District: Shirin Su

Population (2016)
  - Total: 530
- Time zone: UTC+3:30 (IRST)

Negarabad (Persian: نگاراباد) (Note: Also romanized as Negārābād; also known as Nayyerābād and Niyārābād) is a village in Shirin Su Rural District of Shirin Su District in Kabudarahang County, Hamadan province, Iran.

== Demographics ==
=== Population ===
At the time of the 2006 National Census, the village's population was 667 in 135 households. The following census in 2011 counted 619 people in 155 households. The 2016 census measured the population of the village as 530 people in 140 households.
