= Isti Bolagh =

Village in Hamadan province, Iran

Isti Bolagh Persian: ايستي بلاغ
- Village
- Location within Iran
- Coordinates: 35°41′41″N 48°15′57″E
- Country: Iran
- Province: Hamadan
- County: Kabudarahang
- District: Shirin Su
- Rural District: Mehraban-e Olya

Population (2016)
  - Total: 280
- Time zone: UTC+3:30 (IRST)

Isti Bolagh (Persian: ايستي بلاغ) (Note: Also romanized as Īstī Bolāgh; also known as Ishī Bolagh and Islī Bulāq) is a village in Mehraban-e Olya Rural District of Shirin Su District in Kabudarahang County, Hamadan province, Iran.

== Demographics ==
=== Population ===
At the time of the 2006 National Census, the village's population was 284 in 52 households. The following census in 2011 counted 315 people in 76 households. The 2016 census measured the population of the village as 280 people in 77 households.
