= Akanlu =

Village in Hamadan province, Iran

Akanlu Persian: اكنلو
- Village
- Location within Iran
- Coordinates: 35°36′49″N 48°11′18″E
- Country: Iran
- Province: Hamadan
- County: Kabudarahang
- District: Shirin Su
- Rural District: Mehraban-e Olya

Population (2016)
  - Total: 1,668
- Time zone: UTC+3:30 (IRST)

Akanlu (Persian: اكنلو) (Note: Also romanized as Akanlū and Akenlū; also known as Akanlao and Akūnlū) is a village in Mehraban-e Olya Rural District of Shirin Su District in Kabudarahang County, Hamadan province, Iran.

== Etymology ==
In the Dehkhoda dictionary, akan (Turkish) means "cultivate," and the suffix lu denotes a place. Accordingly, akanlu is a Turkish word meaning farmland. In fact the word akinli (a Turkish word) means "the place of cultivation," with akin meaning "cultivation" and li denotes a place.

== Demographics ==
=== Language ===
The language of people in Akanlu is Turkish with a specific accent.

=== Population ===
At the time of the 2006 National Census, the village's population was 1,487 in 334 households. The following census in 2011 counted 1,890 people in 536 households. The 2016 census measured the population of the village as 1,668 people in 439 households.

== Geography ==
Akanlu village is 365 kilometers from Tehran, 138 km from the city of Hamadan, and 73 km from Kabudarahang.

== Economy ==
Taking advantage of the many water resources (aqueducts and springs) and the lush countryside with old-growth trees, vineyards and grasslands, most of the villagers are engaged in farming, animal husbandry, horticulture and forestry.

== Tourist attractions ==
- Pasteur Institute, a branch of Pasteur Institute of Paris
- A square and street named for Prof. Marcel Baltazard, a French physician and medical researcher. Known for his work on plague and rabies, he was the director of the Pasteur Institute of Iran from 1946 to 1961, and then head of the service of epidemiology in the Pasteur Institute of Paris
- Birthplace of Musa Hakimi, a well known traditional physician
- Alisadr and Katale Khor caves, the Shirin Su wetlands and the Lalejin pottery works are a short distance from the village
