= Safa Riz =

Village in Hamadan province, Iran

Safa Riz Persian: صفاريز
- Village
- Location within Iran
- Coordinates: 35°24′25″N 48°18′22″E
- Country: Iran
- Province: Hamadan
- County: Kabudarahang
- District: Shirin Su
- Rural District: Shirin Su

Population (2016)
  - Total: 474
- Time zone: UTC+3:30 (IRST)

Safa Riz (Persian: صفاريز) (Note: Also romanized as Şafā Rīz; also known as Sag-i-Rīz) is a village in Shirin Su Rural District of Shirin Su District in Kabudarahang County, Hamadan province, Iran.

== Demographics ==
=== Population ===
At the time of the 2006 National Census, the village's population was 500 in 106 households. The following census in 2011 counted 547 people in 168 households. The 2016 census measured the population of the village as 474 people in 147 households.
