= Aq Bolagh-e Aqdaq =

Village in Hamadan province, Iran

Aq Bolagh-e Aqdaq Persian: آقبلاق آقداق
- Village
- Location within Iran
- Coordinates: 35°36′44″N 48°26′31″E
- Country: Iran
- Province: Hamadan
- County: Kabudarahang
- District: Shirin Su
- Rural District: Shirin Su

Population (2016)
  - Total: 1,122
- Time zone: UTC+3:30 (IRST)

Aq Bolagh-e Aqdaq (Persian: اقبلاغ اق داق) (Note: Also romanized as Āq Bolāgh-e Āqdāq; also known as Aghbolagh Aghdagh, Āq Bolagh, Āq Bolāgh, Āq Būlāq, and Aqbolāgh Dāgh) is a village in Shirin Su Rural District of Shirin Su District in Kabudarahang County, Hamadan province, Iran.

== Demographics ==
=== Population ===
At the time of the 2006 National Census, the village's population was 1,033 in 239 households. The following census in 2011 counted 1,307 people in 339 households. The 2016 census measured the population of the village as 1,122 people in 317 households.
