= Mehraban-e Olya Rural District =

Rural district in Hamadan province, Iran

Mehraban-e Olya Rural District Persian: دهستان مهربان عليا
- Rural District
- Location within Iran
- Coordinates: 35°36′N 48°13′E
- Country: Iran
- Province: Hamadan
- County: Kabudarahang
- District: Shirin Su
- Established: 1987
- Capital: Challu

Population (2016)
  - Total: 9,168
- Time zone: UTC+3:30 (IRST)

Mehraban-e Olya Rural District (Persian: دهستان مهربان عليا) is in Shirin Su District of Kabudarahang County, Hamadan province, Iran. Its capital is the village of Challu.

== Demographics ==
=== Population ===
At the time of the 2006 National Census, the rural district's population was 10,413 in 2,216 households. There were 11,077 inhabitants in 3,003 households at the following census of 2011. The 2016 census measured the population of the rural district as 9,168 in 2,662 households. The most populous of its 12 villages was Owzon Darreh, with 2,245 people.

=== Other villages in the rural district ===
- Ab Meshkin
- Akanlu
- Aqdash
- Bashqurtaran
- Isti Bolagh
- Masjedin
- Qushjeh
- Sorkhab
