= Marcel Baltazard =

French physician and medical researcher

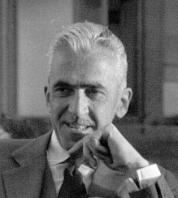
- Born: February 13, 1908; Verdun, Meuse, France
- Died: September 1, 1971 (aged 63); Paris
- Known for: Epidemiological research
- Scientific career
- Institutions: Pasteur Institute of Iran, Tehran and Pasteur Institute of Paris

Marcel Baltazard (February 13, 1908 – September 1, 1971) was a French physician and medical researcher. Known for his work on plague and rabies, he was the director of the Pasteur Institute of Iran from 1946 to 1961 and then head of the service of epidemiology in the Pasteur Institute of Paris.

== Biography ==
After completing secondary school in Verdun in 1924, Marcel Baltazard began studying medicine in Paris, determined to become a clinician.

In 1928, a friend of Marcel Baltazard, C. Desportes, suggested that he join him in Emile Brumpt's laboratory of parasitology (medical faculty in Paris), where he became an assistant in 1931.

In June 1932, Georges Blanc, to whom Emile Roux entrusted the foundation of Institut Pasteur in Morocco, invited him to prepare his doctoral thesis on the Marrakech's bilharziosis focus. From December 1932 to May 1933, in the laboratory of parasitology at the medical faculty (Paris), he studied the spotted fever. He improved his microbiological technique in René Legroux's laboratory in Institut Pasteur. He attended his medical thesis Contribution to the study of the vesical bilharziosis in Morocco.

He then rejoined Georges Blanc at Institut Pasteur of Casablanca, where he did research on the transmission of typhus, sodoku, spirochaete, recurrent fevers. In 1935, he received the Desportes Prize from the French Academy of Medicine.

In 1937, Georges Blanc and Marcel Baltazard create from infected fleas' excrements a new vaccine against typhus.

From 1942 to 1945, he participated in the Italian, French and German campaigns as the head doctor in the first group of Moroccan Tabors-Goums.

Back in Morocco in 1945, he was then sent by René Legroux on a temporary mission at Institut Pasteur of Iran. There he prepared a new contract with the Iranian government that will sign Louis-Pasteur Vallery-Radot, René Legroux and Antoine Lacassagne on behalf of Institut Pasteur.

In 1946, he became the director of the Institut Pasteur of Iran, where he re-planned the scientific structures and architecture. There he organized a national campaign of mass vaccination against smallpox and tuberculosis, the latter with the help of WHO and UNICEF. He collaborated with French, American and Soviet research institutes and also founded an agricultural centre for the social rehabilitation of leprous population.

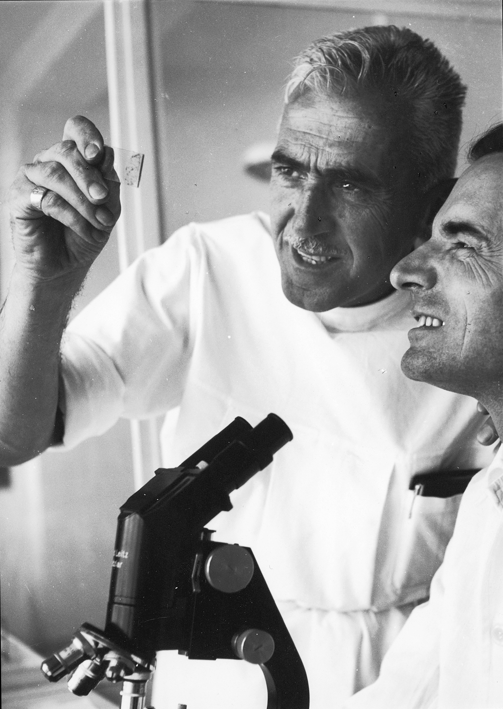
Marcel Baltazard at the Pasteur Institute of Iran (around 1955)

In 1947, he studied a plague epidemic in rural environment in Hamadan Akanlu village, despite the absence of rats on these high plateaux. Studies pointed out the permanence of infection in these foci, and the role played in this permanence by the presence of rodents showing a high resistance to infection. He came to the conclusion that it was necessary to look for a real plague reservoir not among sensitive species eradicated by infection, but among the semi-resistant species that survive. To prove this theory, WHO set up a research campaign associated with Institut Pasteur of Iran.

In 1950, he became WHO' rabies committee expert. He elaborated a testing program of a new serum antirabic, purified and concentrated (called hyperimmun) in the USA. This has paved a new way of using serum antirabic.

In 1954, he was awarded the Bellion Prize by the French Academy of Sciences. In 1956, he becomes member of WHO's expert committee for the plague.

In 1958, Baltazard left Institut Pasteur of Iran and was the adviser of his Iranian colleague, Mahdi Ghodsi, until 1966. In 1961, he elected a corresponding member of the Academy of Medicine, Paris.

In 1966, in the Institut Pasteur in Paris, he remained in contact with his Iranian team associated with WHO and Russian and American researchers.

In 1968, he became departmental head of the new medical service of epidemiology of transmittable diseases, researching and teaching at the same time. He was managed the organization of epidemiology courses. He also continued the research program previously set up in Brazil, Peru, Burma, and Mauritania, with the prospect to extend investigations to other countries.

== Death ==
He died in Paris on September 1, 1971.

== Other ==
- Member of WHO' rabies committee expert (1950–1957)
- Member of WHO's expert committee for the plague (1956)
- Corresponding member of the Academy of medicine (1961)
