= Killing of Saeed Shamghadri =

Iranian academic (1970–2026)

- Part of 2026 Iran war
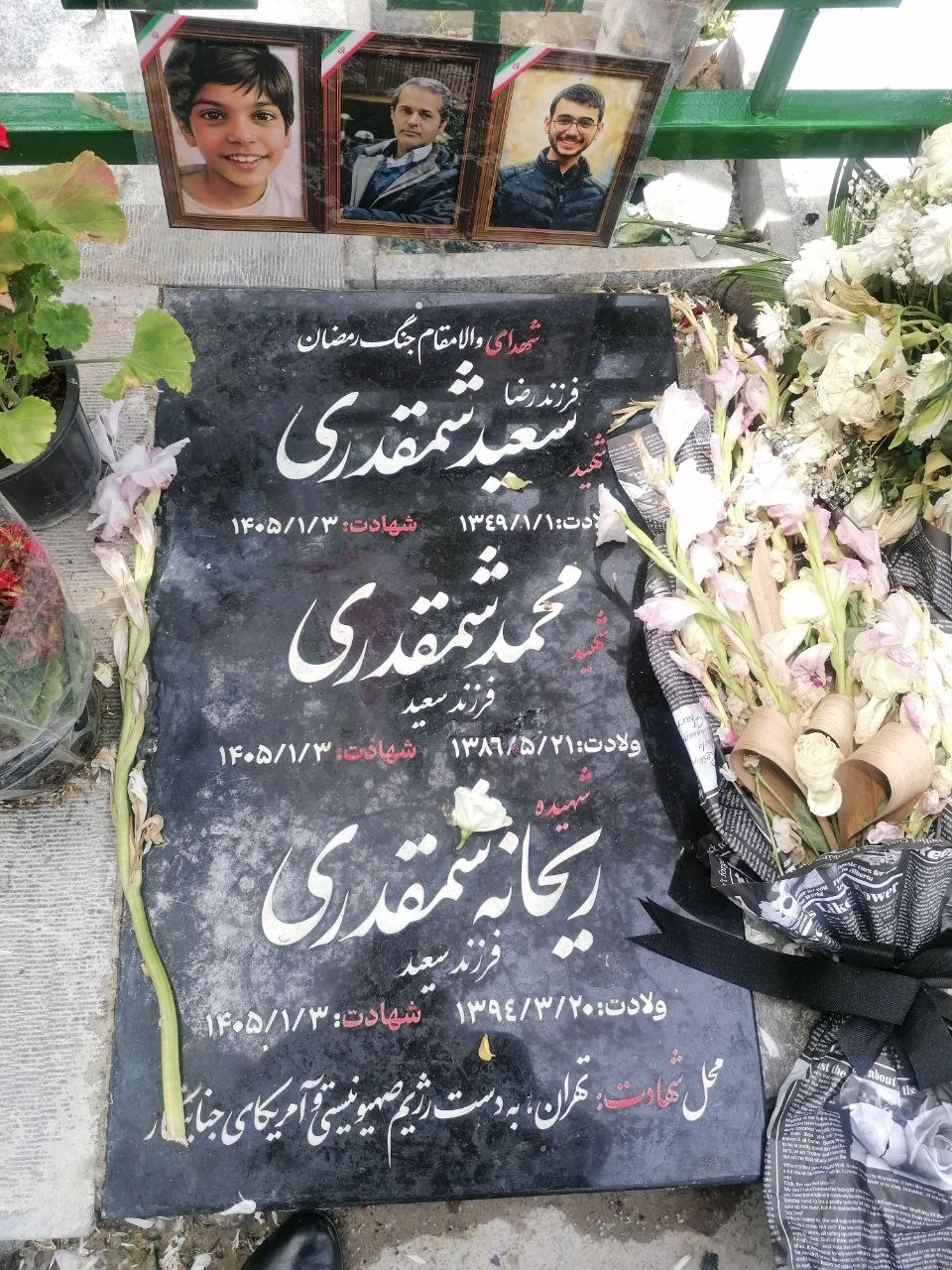
- The grave of Shamghadri
- Type: Airstrike
- Location: Tehran, Iran
- Target: Personal residence of Saeed Shamghadri
- Date: 23 March 2026; 03:00 am
- Executed by: United States, Israel
- Casualties: 3

Saeed Shamaghdari (21 March 1970 – 23 March 2026) was an Iranian academic. He was an Associate Professor of Control Engineering at the Iran University of Science and Technology. During the 2026 Iran war, he and two of his children were killed in an airstrike on 23 March 2026, at his private residence in North Tehran.

== Life ==
Shamghadri lived with his son and daughter in Chizar, North Tehran.

There are conflicting reports on the expertise of Shamghadri, ranging from 'missile expert' to 'air defense' and AI. One of his joint publications shows he was focused on the detection system to defend friendly zones against drones.

== Death ==
Shamghadri's residence was an 8-story building in Chizar district. Video footages from the rescue operation the day after the incident shows a total collapse of a wing of the residence where Shamghadri lived.

== Funeral ==
Shamghadri was buried in Imamzadeh Ali Akbar (Chizar), a religious shrine in the same neighborhood of his house. Several funeral and tribute ceremonies were held, including one in Iran University of Science and Technology and one in Mashhad.

== Reactions ==
- Iran University of Science and Technology condemned the attack and Shamghadri's colleagues asked the international academic community to speak up about the atrocities.
- Many Iranian officials including Mohammad Mokhber visited the remaining members of Shamghadri's family.
- Some Israeli media outlets seconded the legitimacy of the assassination due to the notion that 'science being weaponized by Iran'.

== See also ==
- 2026 Iran University of Science and Technology airstrikes
