= Shirin Su =

City in Hamadan province, Iran

Shirin Su Persian: شيرين سو
- City
- Location within Iran
- Coordinates: 35°29′35″N 48°27′03″E
- Country: Iran
- Province: Hamadan
- County: Kabudarahang
- District: Shirin Su
- Established as a city: 2000

Population (2016)
  - Total: 2,460
- Time zone: UTC+3:30 (IRST)

Shirin Su (Persian: شيرين سو) (Note: Also romanized as Shīrīn Soo and Shīrīn Sū; also known as Shīrūnsū; Azerbaijani: Şirin Su) is a city in, and the capital of, Shirin Su District in Kabudarahang County, Hamadan province, Iran. It also serves as the administrative center for Shirin Su Rural District. The village of Shirin Su was converted to a city in 2000.

== Demographics ==
=== Population ===
At the time of the 2006 National Census, the city's population was2,280 in 507 households. The following census in 2011 counted 3,060 people in 668 households. The 2016 census measured the population of the city as 2,460 people in 651 households.
