= Pasteur Institute of Iran =

Biomedical research centre in Tehran, Iran

- Founded: 21 August 1920; 106 years ago
- Founder: Abdol-Hossein Farman Farma
- Headquarters: Pasteur Street, Tehran, Iran
- Key people: Ehsan Mostafavi, Director
- Parent: Pasteur Institute (1920-1945, Independent since 1946)
- Website: en.pasteur.ac.ir

Pasteur Institute of Iran is a medical research center located in Tehran, Iran. The institute is one of the oldest leading research and public health centers in Iran and the Middle East, established in 1920 following an agreement between the Institute Pasteur of Paris and the Iranian government. The Pasteur Institute of Iran was developed with the help of a land donation from Abdol-Hossein Farmanfarma.

Its mission is to support advanced research and to provide innovative programs in basic and applied medical sciences, and production of biopharmaceuticals and diagnostic kits with special emphasis on infectious diseases. It meets the specialized and scientific health demands of the local community and tries to establish a link between applied research and industry. Pasteur Institute is a leading regional facility in the development and manufacture of vaccines.

The institute has a total staff of 1300 in its 28 departments and 5 branches in different cities of Iran, which are active in different areas of medical and pharmaceutical biotechnology. There are about 300 PhDs and M.Sc. graduates.

This institute is a center that provides public health services and has played a significant role in the prevention and control of infectious diseases in Iran and the world during approximately one hundred years of its activities

== Establishment ==
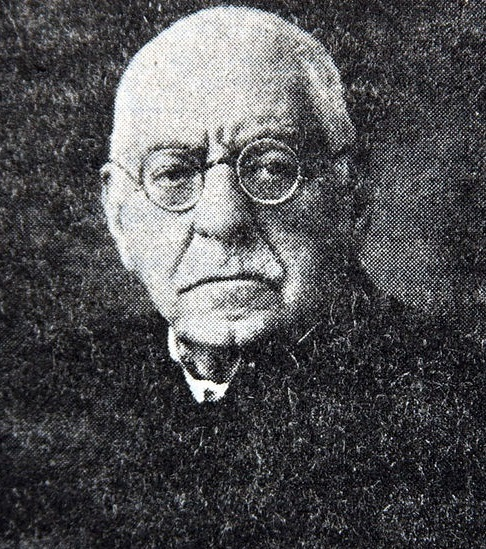
Abdol-Hossein Farmanfarma, founder of the institute

After World War I, as Iran was experiencing famine and infectious diseases, an agreement was signed between the Pasteur Institute of Paris and the Iranian Ministry of Foreign Affairs on January 20, 1920, thereby establishing the 10th Pasteur Institute on the International Pasteur Institute's network. Abdol-Hossein Farmanfarma formed the agreement and ensured its subsequent implementation in his brief tenure as Prime Minister of Persia. He made a personal donation of land and buildings to the institute. The first Pasteur Institute, 32 years earlier, had been founded in 1887 in Paris. Louis Pasteur's goal was to establish branches of the Pasteur Institute for fighting infectious diseases worldwide.

In the years before World War II, when the number of laboratories was scarce, most of the country's health problems were resolved through the Pasteur Institute of Iran. It was also the first medical institute and research center in the country.

In 1946 a new scientific cooperation agreement was signed between Pasteur Institute of Paris and Pasteur Institute of Iran, based on which the latter became financially and administratively independent. At this time, Dr. Marcel Baltazard came to Tehran as the fourth and last French director. Dr. Baltazard was the director of Pasteur Institute of Iran until 1961 and changed its various structures and activities. After that, he continued to serve as a scientific advisor to Pasteur Institute of Iran until 1966.

== Early activities of the institute ==
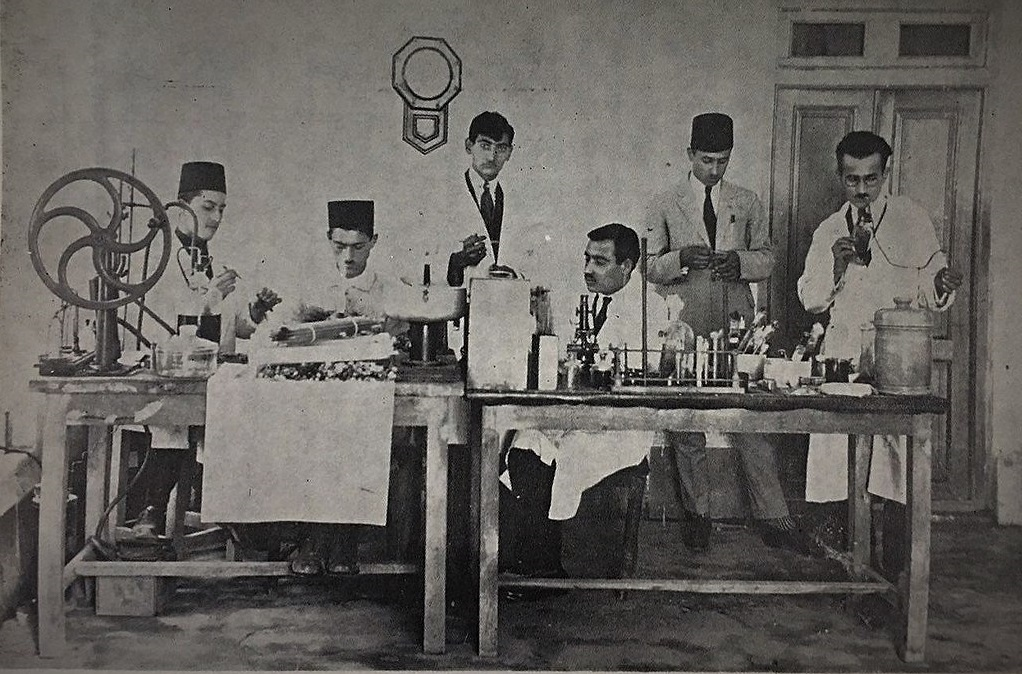
Employees of the Pasteur Institute of Iran at the time of establishment; from right to left: Dr. Ahmad Najmabadi, Dr. Abdollah Hamedi, Dr. Seyed Hassan Mirdamadi, Teymour Mirza Dolatshahi, Seyed Reza, Dr. Mehdi Zorriasateyn.

In the early years of its establishment, Pasteur Institute of Iran consisted of departments of epidemiology, smallpox, virology, tuberculosis, chemistry, rabies, microbiology, vaccination, inoculants, and BCG.

With the establishment of Pasteur Institute of Iran, inoculants and smallpox vaccines have become common in the country. The vaccines produced by Pasteur Institute of Iran also covered other countries in the region such as Iraq, Afghanistan, Pakistan, and Egypt. In the following years, researchers at Pasteur Institute of Iran played an important role in the eradication of smallpox in the Middle East.

Dr. Abolghasem Bahrami went to the Pasteur Institute in Paris in early 1922 and returned to Tehran with a historic Pasteur strain and set up the rabies department at the Pasteur Institute of Iran. Rabies was a serious health problem in the country at the time. The concurrent method of injecting serum and vaccine, demonstrated by Pasteur Institute of Iran, was soon included in the World Health Organization's guidelines for treatment and prevention of rabies. Only with this intervention, Pasteur Institute of Iran could be considered as one of the saviors of humanity. Due to the valuable services of the rabies department at the regional and international level, in 1973, it was selected as the WHO collaborating center for rabies control and research.

BCG department was also established after World War II, and 238 million children from 22 countries used the BCG vaccine produced in Pasteur Institute of Iran. Early in the establishment of Pasteur Institute of Iran, the study of tuberculosis began in the country. After Pasteur Institute of Iran raised the issue of combating tuberculosis in 1952, the TB control organization was set up in the country.

Some viral diseases, such as polio, have also been studied since the institute's establishment. One of the most important indigenous microbial diseases in Iran was typhoid fever. Pasteur Institute of Iran, since its first years of establishment, developed an anti-typhoid vaccine based on native microbes.

During the first fifty years of establishment of Pasteur Institute of Iran, numerous cholera epidemics occurred in Iran, and Pasteur Institute of Iran became the largest cholera vaccine production platform. With the cholera vaccine made in Pasteur Institute of Iran, the vaccine shortage at the Pasteur Institute of Paris was also compensated.

The Department of Epidemiology started new scientific activities in the country. It became a practical epidemiology training center in the country, bringing Iranian and foreign researchers to the study areas and teaching them how to do research. One of the diseases that were pandemic during World War II and caused many casualties was the recurrent fever. The continuous research in the Department of Epidemiology helped to control this disease in the country. In the year 1946, the plague outbreak reported in Kurdistan Province. The Department of Epidemiology conducted extensive studies by qualified experts, provided field labs over the years, and controlled the disease in the west and northwest of the country. In the plague outbreaks of 1946 to 1965, many people were rescued from death by Pasteur Institute of Iran expeditionary groups.

At the same time, with the establishment of the Department of chemistry, injecting serums provided great help to the medical centers of the country. The blood unit in this department also carried out scientific studies in this field.

Research groups from Pasteur Institute of Iran, in the early decades of establishment, also conducted studies on other common infectious diseases in Iran, such as arboviruses and tularemia.

During its career, Pasteur Institute of Iran has also been the founder of numerous other scientific movements, including the establishment of the Leprosy treatment center, the establishment of the Iranian Blood Transfusion Organization, and the disinfection of Tehran's water.

== Waqf ==
The tradition of waqf (Islamic donation) has played an important role in the establishment and promotion of the Pasteur Institute of Iran. In 1923, the late Abdul Hossein Mirza Farmanfarmaian dedicated the land to the Pasteur Institute of Iran for the construction of a new building. Other branches of the institute in Tehran are also based in Shemiranat (donated by the late Sabar Mirza Farmanfarmaian) and Ghaem Magham Street (donated by the late Zabihullah MommayezZadeh) and the branches of Amol (donated by the late Zahra Tajer Mashaei) and Akanlu in Hamedan (donated by the late Manouchehr Gharezloo) are also established based on Waqf.

== Biotechnology activities ==
Since the early 1970s, with the start of the Medical Biotechnology Ph.D. Training Course, steps have been taken to develop biopharmaceuticals by recombinant DNA technologies at Pasteur Institute of Iran.

== Present activities ==
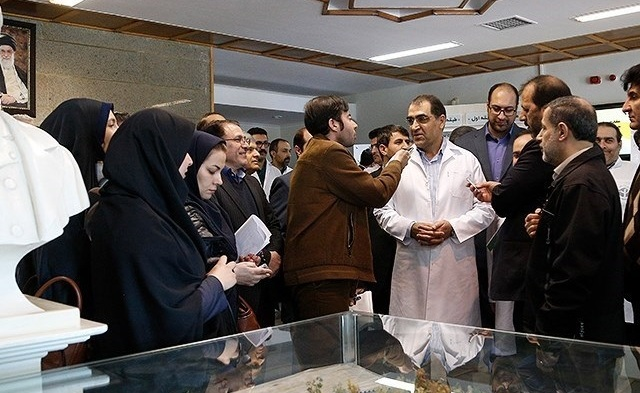
Former health minister Hassan Ghazizadeh Hashemi opens a new research center in Pasteur institute

Over time, the Pasteur Institute of Iran's research departments have been added to suit the needs of the community, and today the institute continues to operate with six research groups and 20 research departments.

== Karaj Production Complex ==
Pasteur Institute of Iran, alongside the Razi Institute, is one of the pillars of human vaccine production in the country. Due to the growing need for vaccines, recombinant products, and injectable solutions, Karaj Production Complex started its activities in 1988. Since the past 100 years, Pasteur Institute of Iran has been able to control various infectious diseases, including smallpox, cholera, rabies, hepatitis B and tuberculosis by producing numerous vaccines and effective health interventions, and has produced other vaccines such as typhoid, anthrax, gonorrhea, and typhus, and has planned to produce pneumococcal and rotavirus vaccines.

== The Pasteur Institute Amol ==
The North Research Center (NRC) of Pasteur is one of the institutions of the Pasteur Institute of Iran, which was established with the efforts of a group of sponsors in the city of Amol in an area of 23,000 square meters in Amol city in 1994 and now includes about 5000 square meters of physical space containing specialized diagnostic and research laboratories.

== Other branches of the institute ==
In 1952, during a plague epidemic in western area of Iran, Pasteur Institute of Iran founded a health research center in Akanlu, a village located between Zanjan, Kurdistan and Hamadan. As a result of the foundation of this center, the various teams of Pasteur Institute of Iran were able to deal with the control of the plague endemic in there via taken effective strategies. This research center is now called the Research Center for Emerging and Re emerging Infection Diseases.

== Educational programs ==
Pasteur Institute of Iran is currently offering a Ph.D. in four disciplines.

== Publications ==
Journal of Medical Microbiology and Infectious Diseases
- Discipline: Medical microbiology
- Language: English
- Edited by: Saied Reza Naddaf

Publication details
- History: 2013–present
- Publisher: Pasteur Institute of Iran
- Frequency: Quarterly

Standard abbreviations
- ISO 4: J. Med. Microbiol. Infect. Dis.

Indexing
- CODEN: JoMMID
- ISSN: 2345-5349 (print); 2345-5330 (web)
- LCCN: RC111

Links
- Journal homepage

The Journal of Medical Microbiology and Infectious Diseases (or JoMMID) is an official scientific quarterly publication of the institute. It is an open access peer reviewed academic journal published in English since November 2013 and approved by the Ministerial Commission for Accreditation of Iranian Medical Journals on October 19, 2014.

Vaccine Research
- Discipline: Medical microbiology
- Language: English
- Edited by: Mohammad Reza Aghasadeghi

Publication details
- History: 2013–present
- Publisher: Pasteur Institute of Iran
- Frequency: Bi-annual

Standard abbreviations
- ISO 4: Vaccine Res.

Indexing
- CODEN: VacRes
- ISSN: 2383-2819 (print); 2423-4923 (web)
- LCCN: QR189

Links
- Journal homepage

Vaccine Research is an international open access peer reviewed academic journal open-access peer-reviewed journal in English that publishes original research papers, review papers, and clinical studies related to all aspects of vaccinology. This interdisciplinary journal publishes the original high-quality research papers that contribute to the field of vaccinology - all original paper submissions across basic and clinical medical research, vaccine manufacturing, history, public policy, behavioral science and ethics, social sciences, safety, and other related areas are welcomed.

== Damage during 2026 Iran war ==
Multiple US-Israeli bombs struck the centre in March 2026 during the 2026 Iran war. These attacks destroyed several buildings and damaged equipment and laboratories, disrupting operations.

The institute was reported by Iranian authorities to have been heavily damaged on 2 April 2026 by Israeli/American attacks during the 2026 Iran war.

International health organizations, including the World Health Organization, expressed concern over reported damage to healthcare and biomedical infrastructure in Iran during the same period. Media reports indicated that the institute was among several scientific and medical facilities impacted.

On May 8, 2026, the international medical journal The Lancet published an article titled "Damage to Iran's Pasteur Institute Threatens Regional Health Security." In it, the journal warned that the weakening of the institute poses a serious threat to the health security of the entire region. The article warns that the loss of some infrastructure has impaired the ability to respond to seasonal and regional disease outbreaks. It calls on the global health community to take all possible measures to protect and fully restore the Pasteur Institute of Iran. The authors emphasize that restoring the institute's diagnostic, surveillance, and vaccine production capabilities is urgently needed to maintain public health security across the region.

== See also ==
- Pasteur Institute
- Pharmaceuticals in Iran
