= Kidney Foundation of Iran =

Iranian organization

Coordinates: 35°42′31.34″N 51°24′31.98″E

- انجمن خیریه حمایت از بیماران کلیوی ایران
- Founder: Hashem Ghasemi
- Legal status: National
- Purpose: Education, prevention and treatment
- Professional title: Kidney Foundation of Iran
- Headquarters: Tehran, Iran
- Location: Valiasr Street
- Services: Clinic, Medical Journal (Shafa)
- Official language: Persian, English
- Staff: More than 100 people
- Website: irankf.org

The Kidney Foundation of Iran (Persian: انجمن خیریه حمایت از بیماران کلیوی ایران) is a charitable, nonprofit organization that addresses needs related to renal disease (including dialysis and kidney transplants). It has more than 55,000 members and 157 branches throughout Iran. These forums since 1359 by a number of patients and their families with the assistance of both individuals and medical benefactors formally began its activities. According to the statute, it is built on the principal objectives of the association:

The principal objectives of the association include:

- Education
- Prevention
- Culture
- Art
- Sports
- Health
- Pharmaceuticals
- Medical
- Welfare
- Support

== Head Office ==
The headquarters is located in Tehran, at Valiasr Street, Taleghani Street, Hosseini Cultural Office, No. 3.
