= Sorkhab, West Azerbaijan =

Sorkhab سرخاب
- Village
- Location within Iran
- Coordinates: 36°26′30″N 45°33′56″E
- Country: Iran
- Province: West Azerbaijan
- County: Mahabad
- Bakhsh: Khalifan
- Rural District: Mangur-e Sharqi

Population (2006)
  - Total: 107
- Time zone: UTC+3:30 (IRST)
  - Summer (DST): UTC+4:30 (IRDT)

Sorkhab (Persian: سرخاب, also Romanized as Sorkhāb) is a village in Mangur-e Sharqi Rural District, Khalifan District, Mahabad County, West Azerbaijan Province, Iran. At the 2006 census, its population was 107, in 17 families.
