= 2026 Iran University of Science and Technology airstrikes =

Airstrike in Tehran, Iran

- Part of 2026 Iran war
- Type: Airstrikes
- Location: Tehran, Iran
- Target: Iran University of Science and Technology
- Date: 28 March 2026; 02:20 am
- Executed by: USA, Israel
- Outcome: 100% of the institute's structures sustained damage; 20% of the Physics Department Budling No.1 and No. 2; 10% of Mathematics Department; minor damage on Basic Science Department; minor damage on Islamic Knowledge Department; minor damage on Foreign Language Department; minor damage on Mechanical Engineering Research Center (ongoing construction project); 500 billion tomans (approximately 3 million USD) in damages
- Casualties: None

On 28 March 2026, the United States-Israel coalition launched airstrikes on the Iran University of Science and Technology (IUST), a scientific and engineering national university in Narmak, Tehran. The airstrike damaged six buildings and caused about 500 billion tomans (approximately US$3 million) in damage. No casualties were reported.

== Background ==
Since the Twelve-Day War in 2025, Iranian universities and academics have been targeted. IUST professor Saeed Shamghadri was killed in an airstrike on his home a few days before on 24 March.

== Damage ==
The airstrikes damaged six buildings. The Aerospace Research Center was reduced to rubble. In addition to the main target, structures, laboratories, classrooms, and professors' offices in Physics Department Building No.1 and No. 2, the Mathematics Department, the Basic Science Department, the Islamic Knowledge Department, the Foreign Language Department, and the Mechanical Engineering Research Center were also affected. According to Helyeh Doutaghi, a researcher based in Tehran familiar with the incident, the attack occurred without warning.

According to the university's administrative and financial VP, at least 500 billion tomans (approximately US$3 million) was sustained in damage due to the airstrike on the IUST campus.

== Reaction ==
Both the Iranian and international academic community reacted strongly to the attacks on Iran University of Science and Technology and, generally, attacks on scientific sites across Iran.

=== Domestic ===
- Iran University of Science and Technology condemned the attack in a statement the following day
- All Iranian universities and research institutions condemned the attack on IUST

=== International ===
- An open letter was signed by 1400 professors, researchers, and scholars (including Nobel Prize laureates May-Britt Moser and Edvard Moser) which condemned the attacks on Iranian universities and called for an immediate stop to such attacks and for aggressors to be held accountable.

== Aftermath ==
Following the attack on IUST, the Islamic Revolutionary Guard Corps (IRGC) said that it would target American and Israeli universities in the region as a response. The statement shared by Tasnim stated that "the United States should be aware that all Israeli and American universities located in the West Asia region would become legitimate targets until two universities are struck in retaliation for the destroyed Iranian universities". As a result, the American University of Beirut shifted to online classes for two days, while the American University of Madaba in Jordan halted in-person instruction. The U.S. embassy in Iraq warned that American universities in Baghdad, Sulaymaniyah, and Dohuk could be targeted.

While Western media outlets considered IRGC threats legitimate, the Dean of the University of Tehran, Mohammad Hossein Omid, published an open letter asking Iran's armed forces to refrain from retaliation against American universities in the region. Omid came under intense criticism in Iran's domestic media for what was described as "appeasement and currying favor with the West", forcing Omid and the University of Tehran to issue another statement, siding with retaliation after the attacks on Pasteur Institute of Iran and Shahid Beheshti University.

== See also ==
- Killing of Saeed Shamghadri: An IUST professor, killed on 24 March 2026 in an airstrike by US/Israeli forces
