= Shirin Su Rural District (Kabudarahang County) =

Rural district in Hamadan province, Iran

Shirin Su Rural District Persian: دهستان شيرين سو
- Rural District
- Location within Iran
- Coordinates: 35°31′N 48°25′E
- Country: Iran
- Province: Hamadan
- County: Kabudarahang
- District: Shirin Su
- Established: 1987
- Capital: Shirin Su

Population (2016)
  - Total: 9,299
- Time zone: UTC+3:30 (IRST)

Shirin Su Rural District (Persian: دهستان شيرين سو) is in Shirin Su District of Kabudarahang County, Hamadan province, Iran. It is administered from the city of Shirin Su.

== Demographics ==
=== Population ===
At the time of the 2006 National Census, the rural district's population was 10,322 in 2,129 households. There were 10,891 inhabitants in 2,927 households at the following census of 2011. The 2016 census measured the population of the rural district as 9,299 in 2,718 households. The most populous of its 16 villages was Baba Khanjar, with 1,494 people.

=== Other villages in the rural district ===
- Abd ol Mowmen
- Aq Bolagh-e Aqdaq
- Aq Kand
- Beshik Tappeh
- Chahar Suq
- Hoseynabad-e Baba Khanjar
- Negarabad
- Safa Riz
