= Sorkhab, Hamadan =

Village in Hamadan province, Iran

Sorkhab Persian: سرخاب
- Village
- Location within Iran
- Coordinates: 35°40′11″N 48°11′30″E
- Country: Iran
- Province: Hamadan
- County: Kabudarahang
- District: Shirin Su
- Rural District: Mehraban-e Olya

Population (2016)
  - Total: 496
- Time zone: UTC+3:30 (IRST)

Sorkhab (Persian: سرخاب) (Note: Also romanized as Sorkhāb; also known as Sūrkhāb) is a village in Mehraban-e Olya Rural District of Shirin Su District in Kabudarahang County, Hamadan province, Iran.

== Demographics ==
=== Population ===
At the time of the 2006 National Census, the village's population was 555 in 103 households. The following census in 2011 counted 569 people in 147 households. The 2016 census measured the population of the village as 496 people in 135 households.
