= Shirin Su District (Kabudarahang County) =

District in Hamadan province, Iran

Shirin Su District Persian: بخش شیرین‌سو
- District
- Location within Iran
- Coordinates: 35°32′N 48°19′E
- Country: Iran
- Province: Hamadan
- County: Kabudarahang
- Established: 1997
- Capital: Shirin Su

Population (2016)
  - Total: 20,927
- Time zone: UTC+3:30 (IRST)

Shirin Su District (Persian: بخش شیرین‌سو) is in Kabudarahang County, Hamadan province, Iran. Its capital is the city of Shirin Su.

== Demographics ==
=== Population ===
At the time of the 2006 National Census, the district's population was 23,015 in 4,852 households. The following census in 2011 counted 25,028 people in 6,598 households. The 2016 census measured the population of the district as 20,927 inhabitants in 6,031 households.

=== Administrative divisions ===
Shirin Su District Population
Administrative Divisions	2006	2011	2016
Mehraban-e Olya RD	10,413	11,077	9,168
Shirin Su RD	10,322	10,891	9,299
Shirin Su (city)	2,280	3,060	2,460
Total	23,015	25,028	20,927
RD = Rural District
