= Qushijeh =

Village in Hamadan province, Iran

Qushijeh Persian: قوشيجه
- Village
- Location within Iran
- Coordinates: 35°03′50″N 49°08′30″E
- Country: Iran
- Province: Hamadan
- County: Famenin
- District: Pish Khowr
- Rural District: Zardasht

Population (2016)
  - Total: 85
- Time zone: UTC+3:30 (IRST)

Qushijeh (Persian: قوشيجه) (Note: Also romanized as Qūshījeh; also known as Qūshjeh) is a village in Zardasht Rural District of Pish Khowr District in Famenin County, Hamadan province, Iran.

== Demographics ==
=== Population ===
At the time of the 2006 National Census, the village's population was 107 in 26 households, when it was in Mofatteh Rural District of the former Famenin District in Hamadan County. The following census in 2011 counted 54 people in 15 households, by which time the district had been separated from the county in the establishment of Famenin County. The rural district was transferred to the new Central District, and Qushijeh was transferred to Zardasht Rural District created in the new Pish Khowr District. The 2016 census measured the population of the village as 85 people in 25 households.
