= Zaraqan, Hamadan =

Village in Hamadan province, Iran

Zaraqan Persian: زرقان
- Village
- Location within Iran
- Coordinates: 35°03′28″N 49°01′45″E
- Country: Iran
- Province: Hamadan
- County: Famenin
- District: Pish Khowr
- Rural District: Zardasht

Population (2016)
  - Total: 874
- Time zone: UTC+3:30 (IRST)

Zaraqan (Persian: زرقان) (Note: Also romanized as Zaraqān and Zarqān; also known as Zaraghan, Zaraq, and Zarghan) is a village in Zardasht Rural District of Pish Khowr District in Famenin County, Hamadan province, Iran.

== Demographics ==
=== Population ===
At the time of the 2006 National Census, the village's population was 1,079 in 275 households, when it was in Khorram Dasht Rural District of the former Famenin District in Hamadan County. The following census in 2011 counted 973 people in 283 households, by which time the district had been separated from the county in the establishment of Famenin County. The rural district was transferred to the new Central District, and Zaraqan was transferred to Zardasht Rural District created in the new Pish Khowr District. The 2016 census measured the population of the village as 874 people in 290 households.
