= Khomajin, Famenin =

Village in Hamadan province, Iran

Khomajin Persian: خماجين
- Village
- Location within Iran
- Coordinates: 35°02′53″N 49°09′37″E
- Country: Iran
- Province: Hamadan
- County: Famenin
- District: Pish Khowr
- Rural District: Zardasht

Population (2016)
  - Total: 157
- Time zone: UTC+3:30 (IRST)

Khomajin (Persian: خماجين) (Note: Also romanized as Khomājīn; also known as Khumāin) is a village in, and the capital of, Zardasht Rural District in Pish Khowr District of Famenin County, Hamadan province, Iran.

== Demographics ==
=== Population ===
At the time of the 2006 National Census, the village's population was 166 in 35 households, when it was in Mofatteh Rural District of the former Famenin District in Hamadan County. The following census in 2011 counted 160 people in 44 households, by which time the district had been separated from the county in the establishment of Famenin County. The rural district was transferred to the new Central District, and Khomajin was transferred to Zardasht Rural District created in the new Pish Khowr District. The 2016 census measured the population of the village as 157 people in 52 households.
