= Khvoshabad, Hamadan =

Village in Hamadan province, Iran

Khvoshabad Persian: خوش اباد
- Village
- Location within Iran
- Coordinates: 35°03′11″N 49°05′34″E
- Country: Iran
- Province: Hamadan
- County: Famenin
- District: Pish Khowr
- Rural District: Zardasht

Population (2016)
  - Total: 480
- Time zone: UTC+3:30 (IRST)

Khvoshabad (Persian: خوش اباد) (Note: Also romanized as Khosh Abad, Khowshābād, Khushābād, and Khvoshābād) is a village in Zardasht Rural District of Pish Khowr District in Famenin County, Hamadan province, Iran.

== Demographics ==
=== Population ===
At the time of the 2006 National Census, the village's population was 655 in 153 households, when it was in Khorram Dasht Rural District of the former Famenin District in Hamadan County. The following census in 2011 counted 596 people in 165 households, by which time the district had been separated from the county in the establishment of Famenin County. The rural district was transferred to the new Central District, and Khvoshabad was transferred to Zardasht Rural District created in the new Pish Khowr District. The 2016 census measured the population of the village as 480 people in 155 households.
