= Qaleh Juq, Hamadan =

Village in Hamadan province, Iran

Qaleh Juq Persian: قلعه جوق
- Village
- Location within Iran
- Coordinates: 34°57′35″N 49°15′03″E
- Country: Iran
- Province: Hamadan
- County: Famenin
- District: Pish Khowr
- Rural District: Zardasht

Population (2016)
  - Total: 841
- Time zone: UTC+3:30 (IRST)

Qaleh Juq (Persian: قلعه جوق) (Note: Also romanized as Qal‘eh Jūq; also known as Ghal‘eh Jogh, Qal‘eh Jokh, Qal‘eh Joq, Qal‘eh Jūkh, Qal‘eh-ye Joq, and Qal‘eh-ye Jūq Dar Jazīn) is a village in Zardasht Rural District of Pish Khowr District in Famenin County, Hamadan province, Iran.

== Demographics ==
=== Population ===
At the time of the 2006 National Census, the village's population was 1,271 in 268 households, when it was in Mofatteh Rural District of the former Famenin District in Hamadan County. The following census in 2011 counted 1,098 people in 260 households, by which time the district had been separated from the county in the establishment of Famenin County. The rural district was transferred to the new Central District, and Qaleh Juq was transferred to Zardasht Rural District created in the new Pish Khowr District. The 2016 census measured the population of the village as 841 people in 243 households.
