= Nasirabad, Hamadan =

Village in Hamadan province, Iran

Nasirabad Persian: نصيراباد
- Village
- Location within Iran
- Coordinates: 35°03′23″N 49°03′40″E
- Country: Iran
- Province: Hamadan
- County: Famenin
- District: Pish Khowr
- Rural District: Zardasht

Population (2016)
  - Total: 768
- Time zone: UTC+3:30 (IRST)

Nasirabad (Persian: نصيراباد) (Note: Also romanized as Naşīrābād; also known as Naşrābād) is a village in Zardasht Rural District of Pish Khowr District in Famenin County, Hamadan province, Iran.

== Demographics ==
=== Population ===
At the time of the 2006 National Census, the village's population was 1,013 in 213 households, when it was in Khorram Dasht Rural District of the former Famenin District in Hamadan County. The following census in 2011 counted 852 people in 246 households, by which time the district had been separated from the county in the establishment of Famenin County. The rural district was transferred to the new Central District, and Nasirabad was transferred to Zardasht Rural District created in the new Pish Khowr District. The 2016 census measured the population of the village as 768 people in 255 households.
