= Qezel Hesar, Hamadan =

Village in Hamadan province, Iran

Qezel Hesar Persian: قزل حصار
- Village
- Location within Iran
- Coordinates: 35°01′32″N 49°07′26″E
- Country: Iran
- Province: Hamadan
- County: Famenin
- District: Pish Khowr
- Rural District: Zardasht

Population (2016)
  - Total: 123
- Time zone: UTC+3:30 (IRST)

Qezel Hesar (Persian: قزل حصار) (Note: Also romanized as Qezel Ḩeşār; also known as Ghezel Hesan and Qizil Hisār) is a village in Zardasht Rural District of Pish Khowr District in Famenin County, Hamadan province, Iran.

== Demographics ==
=== Population ===
At the time of the 2006 National Census, the village's population was 134 in 33 households, when it was in Mofatteh Rural District of the former Famenin District in Hamadan County. The following census in 2011 counted 100 people in 29 households, by which time the district had been separated from the county in the establishment of Famenin County. The rural district was transferred to the new Central District, and Qezel Hesar was transferred to Zardasht Rural District created in the new Pish Khowr District. The 2016 census measured the population of the village as 123 people in 41 households.
