= Tamachi, Iran =

Village in Hamadan province, Iran

Tamachi Persian: طمچي
- Village
- Location within Iran
- Coordinates: 34°59′10″N 49°12′19″E
- Country: Iran
- Province: Hamadan
- County: Famenin
- District: Pish Khowr
- Rural District: Zardasht

Population (2016)
  - Total: 272
- Time zone: UTC+3:30 (IRST)

Tamachi (Persian: طمچي) (Note: Also romanized as Ţamachī and Tamchī; also known as Ţameh Chī) is a village in Zardasht Rural District of Pish Khowr District in Famenin County, Hamadan province, Iran.

== Demographics ==
=== Population ===
At the time of the 2006 National Census, the village's population was 390 in 85 households, when it was in Mofatteh Rural District of the former Famenin District in Hamadan County. The following census in 2011 counted 371 people in 92 households, by which time the district had been separated from the county in the establishment of Famenin County. The rural district was transferred to the new Central District, and Tamachi was transferred to Zardasht Rural District created in the new Pish Khowr District. The 2016 census measured the population of the village as 272 people in 81 households.
