= Qezelabad, Famenin =

Village in Hamadan province, Iran

Qezelabad Persian: قزل اباد
- Village
- Location within Iran
- Coordinates: 35°05′35″N 49°07′20″E
- Country: Iran
- Province: Hamadan
- County: Famenin
- District: Pish Khowr
- Rural District: Zardasht

Population (2016)
  - Total: 1,005
- Time zone: UTC+3:30 (IRST)

Qezelabad (Persian: قزل اباد) (Note: Also romanized as Qezelābād) is a village in Zardasht Rural District of Pish Khowr District in Famenin County, Hamadan province, Iran.

== Demographics ==
=== Population ===
At the time of the 2006 National Census, the village's population was 1,102 in 252 households, when it was in Mofatteh Rural District of the former Famenin District in Hamadan County. The following census in 2011 counted 1,200 people in 310 households, by which time the district had been separated from the county in the establishment of Famenin County. The rural district was transferred to the new Central District, and Qezelabad was transferred to Zardasht Rural District created in the new Pish Khowr District. The 2016 census measured the population of the village as 1,005 people in 306 households, the most populous in its rural district.
