= Zeraq =

Village in Hamadan province, Iran

Zeraq Persian: زرق
- Village
- Location within Iran
- Coordinates: 35°04′17″N 49°10′10″E
- Country: Iran
- Province: Hamadan
- County: Famenin
- District: Pish Khowr
- Rural District: Zardasht

Population (2016)
  - Total: 115
- Time zone: UTC+3:30 (IRST)

Zeraq (Persian: زرق) (Note: Also romanized as Zaraq and Zarraq; also known as Zar, Zaragh, Zāreh, and Zarreh) is a village in Zardasht Rural District of Pish Khowr District in Famenin County, Hamadan province, Iran.

== Demographics ==
=== Population ===
At the time of the 2006 National Census, the village's population was 205 in 38 households, when it was in Mofatteh Rural District of the former Famenin District in Hamadan County. The following census in 2011 counted 119 people in 35 households, by which time the district had been separated from the county in the establishment of Famenin County. The rural district was transferred to the new Central District, and Zeraq was transferred to Zardasht Rural District created in the new Pish Khowr District. The 2016 census measured the population of the village as 115 people in 35 households.
