= Jahanabad, Famenin =

Village in Hamadan province, Iran

Jahanabad Persian: جهان اباد
- Village
- Location within Iran
- Coordinates: 35°04′22″N 48°57′42″E
- Country: Iran
- Province: Hamadan
- County: Famenin
- District: Central
- Rural District: Khorram Dasht

Population (2016)
  - Total: 1,085
- Time zone: UTC+3:30 (IRST)

Jahanabad (Persian: جهان اباد) (Note: Also romanized as Jahānābād) is a village in Khorram Dasht Rural District of the Central District in Famenin County, Hamadan province, Iran.

== Demographics ==
=== Population ===
At the time of the 2006 National Census, the village's population was 1,243 in 281 households, when it was in the former Famenin District of Hamadan County. The following census in 2011 counted 1,033 people in 303 households, by which time the district had been separated from the county in the establishment of Famenin County. The rural district was transferred to the new Central District. The 2016 census measured the population of the village as 1,085 people in 349 households.
