= Dehlaq, Famenin =

Village in Hamadan province, Iran

Dehlaq Persian: دهلق
- Village
- Location within Iran
- Coordinates: 35°13′28″N 49°07′11″E
- Country: Iran
- Province: Hamadan
- County: Famenin
- District: Central
- Rural District: Mofatteh

Population (2016)
  - Total: 925
- Time zone: UTC+3:30 (IRST)

Dehlaq (Persian: دهلق) is a village in Mofatteh Rural District of the Central District in Famenin County, Hamadan province, Iran.

== Demographics ==
=== Population ===
At the time of the 2006 National Census, the village's population was 1,098 in 235 households, when it was in the former Famenin District of Hamadan County. The following census in 2011 counted 1,212 people in 289 households, by which time the district had been separated from the county in the establishment of Famenin County. The rural district was transferred to the new Central District. The 2016 census measured the population of the village as 925 people in 265 households.
