= Hajjiabad, Famenin =

Village in Hamadan province, Iran

Hajjiabad Persian: حاجي اباد
- Village
- Location within Iran
- Coordinates: 35°08′48″N 49°01′14″E
- Country: Iran
- Province: Hamadan
- County: Famenin
- District: Central
- Rural District: Khorram Dasht

Population (2016)
  - Total: 371
- Time zone: UTC+3:30 (IRST)

Hajjiabad (Persian: حاجي اباد) (Note: Also romanized as Ḩājjīābād) is a village in Khorram Dasht Rural District of the Central District in Famenin County, Hamadan province, Iran.

== Demographics ==
=== Population ===
At the time of the 2006 National Census, the village's population was 442 in 119 households, when it was in the former Famenin District of Hamadan County. The following census in 2011 counted 420 people in 123 households, by which time the district had been separated from the county in the establishment of Famenin County. The rural district was transferred to the new Central District. The 2016 census measured the population of the village as 371 people in 120 households.
