= Tavaleh =

Village in Hamadan province, Iran

Tavaleh Persian: طواله
- Village
- Location within Iran
- Coordinates: 35°09′16″N 49°02′38″E
- Country: Iran
- Province: Hamadan
- County: Famenin
- District: Central
- Rural District: Khorram Dasht

Population (2016)
  - Total: 55
- Time zone: UTC+3:30 (IRST)

Tavaleh (Persian: طواله) (Note: Also romanized as Ţavāleh) is a village in Khorram Dasht Rural District of the Central District in Famenin County, Hamadan province, Iran.

== Demographics ==
=== Population ===
At the time of the 2006 National Census, the village's population was 134 in 32 households, when it was in the former Famenin District of Hamadan County. The following census in 2011 counted 86 people in 29 households, by which time the district had been separated from the county in the establishment of Famenin County. The rural district was transferred to the new Central District. The 2016 census measured the population of the village as 55 people in 22 households.
