= Akleh =

Village in Hamadan province, Iran

Akleh Persian: اكله
- Village
- Location within Iran
- Coordinates: 35°12′10″N 49°04′58″E
- Country: Iran
- Province: Hamadan
- County: Famenin
- District: Central
- Rural District: Mofatteh

Population (2016)
  - Total: 323
- Time zone: UTC+3:30 (IRST)

Akleh (Persian: اكله) (Note: Also known as Aquel and Hareyān Akleh) is a village in Mofatteh Rural District of the Central District in Famenin County, Hamadan province, Iran.

== Demographics ==
=== Population ===
At the time of the 2006 National Census, the village's population was 413 in 99 households, when it was in the former Famenin District of Hamadan County. The following census in 2011 counted 386 people in 97 households, by which time the district had been separated from the county in the establishment of Famenin County. The rural district was transferred to the new Central District. The 2016 census measured the population of the village as 323 people in 94 households.
