= Kalleh Sar, Hamadan =

Village in Hamadan province, Iran

Kalleh Sar Persian: كله سر
- Village
- Location within Iran
- Coordinates: 35°12′10″N 49°06′16″E
- Country: Iran
- Province: Hamadan
- County: Famenin
- District: Central
- Rural District: Mofatteh

Population (2016)
  - Total: 301
- Time zone: UTC+3:30 (IRST)

Kalleh Sar (Persian: كله سر) (Note: Also known as Galleh Sar) is a village in Mofatteh Rural District of the Central District in Famenin County, Hamadan province, Iran.

== Demographics ==
=== Population ===
At the time of the 2006 National Census, the village's population was 434 in 106 households, when it was in the former Famenin District of Hamadan County. The following census in 2011 counted 388 people in 112 households, by which time the district had been separated from the county in the establishment of Famenin County. The rural district was transferred to the new Central District. The 2016 census measured the population of the village as 301 people in 99 households.
