= Saravak =

Village in Hamadan province, Iran

Saravak Persian: سراوك
- Village
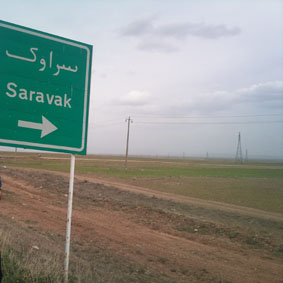
- Landscape near the village of Saravak

- Location within Iran
- Coordinates: 35°10′45″N 48°56′47″E
- Country: Iran
- Province: Hamadan
- County: Famenin
- District: Central
- Rural District: Khorram Dasht

Population (2016)
  - Total: 1,363
- Time zone: UTC+3:30 (IRST)

Saravak (Persian: سراوك) (Note: Also romanized as Sarāvak; also known as Sarābak) is a village in Khorram Dasht Rural District of the Central District in Famenin County, Hamadan province, Iran.

== Demographics ==
=== Population ===
At the time of the 2006 National Census, the village's population was 1,474 in 364 households, when it was in the former Famenin District of Hamadan County. The following census in 2011 counted 1,401 people in 416 households, by which time the district had been separated from the county in the establishment of Famenin County. The rural district was transferred to the new Central District. The 2016 census measured the population of the village as 1,363 people in 418 households.
