= Sanaj =

Village in Hamadan province, Iran

Sanaj Persian: سناج
- Village
- Location within Iran
- Coordinates: 35°07′18″N 49°01′30″E
- Country: Iran
- Province: Hamadan
- County: Famenin
- District: Central
- Rural District: Khorram Dasht

Population (2016)
  - Total: 515
- Time zone: UTC+3:30 (IRST)

Sanaj (Persian: سناج) (Note: Also romanized as Sanāj and Senāj; also known as Sināj) is a village in Khorram Dasht Rural District of the Central District in Famenin County, Hamadan province, Iran.

== Demographics ==
=== Population ===
At the time of the 2006 National Census, the village's population was 746 in 178 households, when it was in the former Famenin District of Hamadan County. The following census in 2011 counted 572 people in 182 households, by which time the district had been separated from the county in the establishment of Famenin County. The rural district was transferred to the new Central District. The 2016 census measured the population of the village as 515 people in 168 households.
