= Aminabad, Famenin =

Village in Hamadan province, Iran

Aminabad Persian: امين اباد
- Village
- Location within Iran
- Coordinates: 35°04′45″N 48°53′36″E
- Country: Iran
- Province: Hamadan
- County: Famenin
- District: Central
- Rural District: Khorram Dasht

Population (2016)
  - Total: 76
- Time zone: UTC+3:30 (IRST)

Aminabad (Persian: امين اباد) (Note: Also romanized as Amīnābād; also known as Qal‘eh-i-‘Ainabad) is a village in Khorram Dasht Rural District of the Central District in Famenin County, Hamadan province, Iran.

== Demographics ==
=== Population ===
At the time of the 2006 National Census, the village's population was 261 in 51 households, when it was in the former Famenin District of Hamadan County. The following census in 2011 counted 157 people in 34 households, by which time the district had been separated from the county in the establishment of Famenin County. The rural district was transferred to the new Central District. The 2016 census measured the population of the village as 76 people in 19 households.
