= Asleh =

Village in Hamadan province, Iran

Asleh Persian: اصله
- Village
- Location within Iran
- Coordinates: 35°08′59″N 49°04′20″E
- Country: Iran
- Province: Hamadan
- County: Famenin
- District: Central
- Rural District: Mofatteh

Population (2016)
  - Total: 2,093
- Time zone: UTC+3:30 (IRST)

Asleh (Persian: اصله) (Note: Also romanized as Asaleh and Aşleh) is a village in, and the capital of, Mofatteh Rural District in the Central District of Famenin County, Hamadan province, Iran.

== Demographics ==
=== Population ===
At the time of the 2006 National Census, the village's population was 2,260 in 549 households, when it was in the former Famenin District of Hamadan County. The following census in 2011 counted 2,345 people in 672 households, by which time the district had been separated from the county in the establishment of Famenin County. The rural district was transferred to the new Central District. The 2016 census measured the population of the village as 2,093 people in 643 households, the most populous in its rural district.
