= Ajorlu =

Village in Hamadan province, Iran

Ajorlu Persian: اجرلو
- Village
- Location within Iran
- Coordinates: 35°08′19″N 49°13′47″E
- Country: Iran
- Province: Hamadan
- County: Famenin
- District: Pish Khowr
- Rural District: Pish Khowr

Population (2016)
  - Total: 341
- Time zone: UTC+3:30 (IRST)

Ajorlu (Persian: اجرلو) (Note: Also romanized as Ajarlu, Ājerlū, and Ājorlū) is a village in Pish Khowr Rural District of Pish Khowr District in Famenin County, Hamadan province, Iran.

== Population ==
At the time of the 2006 National Census, the village's population was 304 in 84 households, when it was in the former Famenin District of Hamadan County. The following census in 2011 counted 281 people in 83 households, by which time the district had been separated from the county in the establishment of Famenin County. The rural district was transferred to the new Pish Khowr District. The 2016 census measured the population of the village as 341 people in 110 households.
