= Negar Khatun =

Village in Hamadan province, Iran

Negar Khatun Persian: نگارخاتون
- Village
- Location within Iran
- Coordinates: 35°07′07″N 48°55′32″E
- Country: Iran
- Province: Hamadan
- County: Famenin
- District: Central
- Rural District: Khorram Dasht

Population (2016)
  - Total: 1,971
- Time zone: UTC+3:30 (IRST)

Negar Khatun (Persian: نگارخاتون) (Note: Also romanized as Negar Khatoon and Negār Khātūn; also known as Nigar Khātūn) is a village in Khorram Dasht Rural District of the Central District in Famenin County, Hamadan province, Iran.

The nearby Negar Khatun Hill, named after the village due to its proximity, has been deemed to enfold notable archaeological importance.

== Demographics ==
=== Population ===
At the time of the 2006 National Census, the village's population was 1,911 in 425 households, when it was in the former Famenin District of Hamadan County. The following census in 2011 counted 2,071 people in 583 households, by which time the district had been separated from the county in the establishment of Famenin County. The rural district was transferred to the new Central District. The 2016 census measured the population of the village as 1,971 people in 583 households.
