= Amirabad-e Ali Nur =

Village in Hamadan province, Iran

Amirabad-e Ali Nur Persian: اميرابادعلي نور
- Village
- Location within Iran
- Coordinates: 35°04′21″N 49°00′44″E
- Country: Iran
- Province: Hamadan
- County: Famenin
- District: Central
- Rural District: Khorram Dasht

Population (2016)
  - Total: 939
- Time zone: UTC+3:30 (IRST)

Amirabad-e Ali Nur (Persian: اميرابادعلي نور) (Note: Also romanized as Amīrābād-e ʿAlī Nūr; also known as Amīrābād) is a village in Khorram Dasht Rural District of the Central District in Famenin County, Hamadan province, Iran.

== Demographics ==
=== Population ===
At the time of the 2006 National Census, the village's population was 968 in 230 households, when it was in the former Famenin District of Hamadan County. The following census in 2011 counted 980 people in 277 households, by which time the district had been separated from the county in the establishment of Famenin County. The rural district was transferred to the new Central District. The 2016 census measured the population of the village as 939 people in 288 households.
