= Chopoqlu, Famenin =

Village in Hamadan province, Iran

Chopoqlu Persian: چپقلو
- Village
- Location within Iran
- Coordinates: 35°08′52″N 49°27′33″E
- Country: Iran
- Province: Hamadan
- County: Famenin
- District: Pish Khowr
- Rural District: Pish Khowr

Population (2016)
  - Total: 328
- Time zone: UTC+3:30 (IRST)

Chopoqlu (Persian: چپقلو) (Note: Also romanized as Chepeqlū, Chopoqlū, and Çopoqlu; also known as Choboqlū, Chopoghloo, Saboklū, and Sabūqalū) is a village in Pish Khowr Rural District of Pish Khowr District in Famenin County, Hamadan province, Iran.

== Population ==
At the time of the 2006 National Census, the village's population was 254 in 71 households, when it was in the former Famenin District of Hamadan County. The following census in 2011 counted 221 people in 78 households, by which time the district had been separated from the county in the establishment of Famenin County. The rural district was transferred to the new Pish Khowr District. The 2016 census measured the population of the village as 328 people in 100 households.
