= Feyzabad, Hamadan =

Village in Hamadan province, Iran

Feyzabad Persian: فيض اباد
- Village
- Location within Iran
- Coordinates: 35°08′03″N 48°54′13″E
- Country: Iran
- Province: Hamadan
- County: Famenin
- District: Central
- Rural District: Khorram Dasht

Population (2016)
  - Total: 2,489
- Time zone: UTC+3:30 (IRST)

Feyzabad (Persian: فيض اباد) (Note: Also romanized as Faīzābād, Feīz Abad, and Feyẕābād; also known as Ḩasanābād) is a village in Khorram Dasht Rural District of the Central District in Famenin County, Hamadan province, Iran.

== Demographics ==
=== Population ===
At the time of the 2006 National Census, the village's population was 2,427 in 576 households, when it was in the former Famenin District of Hamadan County. The following census in 2011 counted 2,869 people in 783 households, by which time the district had been separated from the county in the establishment of Famenin County. The rural district was transferred to the new Central District. The 2016 census measured the population of the village as 2,489 people in 690 households, the most populous in its rural district.
