= Qomshaneh, Famenin =

Village in Hamadan province, Iran

Qomshaneh Persian: قمشانه
- Village
- Location within Iran
- Coordinates: 35°09′48″N 49°17′04″E
- Country: Iran
- Province: Hamadan
- County: Famenin
- District: Pish Khowr
- Rural District: Pish Khowr

Population (2016)
  - Total: 363
- Time zone: UTC+3:30 (IRST)

Qomshaneh (Persian: قمشانه) (Note: Also romanized as Qomshāneh; also known as Ghomeshaneh Pishkhar, Gomīshāneh, Kūmshan, Qamīshan, Qomīshāneh, and Qomūshān) is a village in Pish Khowr Rural District of Pish Khowr District in Famenin County, Hamadan province, Iran.

== Population ==
At the time of the 2006 National Census, the village's population was 276 in 51 households, when it was in the former Famenin District of Hamadan County. The following census in 2011 counted 360 people in 99 households, by which time the district had been separated from the county in the establishment of Famenin County. The rural district was transferred to the new Pish Khowr District. The 2016 census measured the population of the village as 363 people in 98 households.
