= Morghabad =

Village in Hamadan province, Iran

Morghabad Persian: مرغ اباد
- Village
- Location within Iran
- Coordinates: 35°11′18″N 49°16′58″E
- Country: Iran
- Province: Hamadan
- County: Famenin
- District: Pish Khowr
- Rural District: Pish Khowr

Population (2016)
  - Total: 261
- Time zone: UTC+3:30 (IRST)

Morghabad (Persian: مرغ اباد) (Note: Also romanized as Morghābād; also known as Murghābād) is a village in Pish Khowr Rural District of Pish Khowr District in Famenin County, Hamadan province, Iran.

== Population ==
At the time of the 2006 National Census, the village's population was 216 in 52 households, when it was in the former Famenin District of Hamadan County. The following census in 2011 counted 268 people in 82 households, by which time the district had been separated from the county in the establishment of Famenin County. The rural district was transferred to the new Pish Khowr District. The 2016 census measured the population of the village as 261 people in 83 households.
