= Aghaj =

Village in Hamadan province, Iran

Aghaj Persian: آغاج
- Village
- Location within Iran
- Coordinates: 34°57′21″N 49°19′27″E
- Country: Iran
- Province: Hamadan
- County: Famenin
- District: Pish Khowr
- Rural District: Pish Khowr

Population (2016)
  - Total: 339
- Time zone: UTC+3:30 (IRST)

Aghaj (Persian: آغاج) (Note: Also romanized as Āghāj; formerly known as Aqaj (اقاج), also romanized as Āqāj; also known as Āgāch and Āqāch) is a village in Pish Khowr Rural District of Pish Khowr District in Famenin County, Hamadan province, Iran.

== Demographics ==
=== Language ===
It is an Azeri Turkic speaking village.

=== Population ===
At the time of the 2006 National Census, the village's population, as Aqaj, was 286 in 72 households, when it was in the former Famenin District of Hamadan County. The following census in 2011 counted 341 people in 100 households, by which time the district had been separated from the county in the establishment of Famenin County. The rural district was transferred to the new Pish Khowr District. The 2016 census measured the population of the village, now listed as Aghaj, to be 339 people in 100 households.

== Notable people ==
Ghiyasaddin Taha Mohammadi, Shia Cleric
