= Pavan, Iran =

Village in Hamadan province, Iran

Pavan Persian: پاوان
- Village

- Location within Iran
- Coordinates: 35°10′01″N 49°19′59″E
- Country: Iran
- Province: Hamadan
- County: Famenin
- District: Pish Khowr
- Rural District: Pish Khowr

Population (2016)
  - Total: 369
- Time zone: UTC+3:30 (IRST)

Pavan (Persian: پاوان) (Note: Also romanized as Pāvān and Pāwān) is a village in Pish Khowr Rural District of Pish Khowr District in Famenin County, Hamadan province, Iran.

== Population ==
At the time of the 2006 National Census, the village's population was 269 in 78 households, when it was in the former Famenin District of Hamadan County. The following census in 2011 counted 268 people in 86 households, by which time the district had been separated from the county in the establishment of Famenin County. The rural district was transferred to the new Pish Khowr District. The 2016 census measured the population of the village as 369 people in 118 households.
