= Pish Khowr =

Pish Khowr (Persian: پیشخور) may refer to:

- Pish Khowr District
- Pish Khowr Rural District
