= Qara Deh =

Qara Deh (Persian: قراده) may refer to:

- Qara Deh, Hamadan
- Qara Deh, Lorestan
