= Hameh Kasi, Famenin =

Village in Hamadan province, Iran

Hameh Kasi Persian: همه كسي
- Village
- Location within Iran
- Coordinates: 35°01′23″N 48°58′11″E
- Country: Iran
- Province: Hamadan
- County: Famenin
- District: Central
- Rural District: Khorram Dasht

Population (2016)
  - Total: 670
- Time zone: UTC+3:30 (IRST)

Hameh Kasi (Persian: همه كسي) (Note: Also romanized as Hameh Kasī; also known as Hamakasi and Hamehkasi Shara) is a village in Khorram Dasht Rural District of the Central District in Famenin County, Hamadan province, Iran.

== Demographics ==
=== Population ===
At the time of the 2006 National Census, the village's population was 905 in 200 households, when it was in Chah Dasht Rural District of Shara District in Hamadan County. The following census in 2011 counted 700 people in 208 households, by which time the village had been separated from the county in the establishment of Famenin County. It was transferred to Khorram Dasht Rural District in the new Central District. The 2016 census measured the population of the village as 670 people in 212 households.
