= Zareh, Iran =

Zareh (Persian: زاره) may refer to:

- Zareh, Hamadan
- Zareh, Kerman
