= Qarah Day =

Qarah Day قره داي
- Village
- Location within Iran
- Coordinates: 35°07′31″N 49°16′56″E
- Country: Iran
- Province: Hamadan
- County: Famenin
- Bakhsh: Pish Khowr
- Rural District: Pish Khowr

Population (2006)
  - Total: 254
- Time zone: UTC+3:30 (IRST)
  - Summer (DST): UTC+4:30 (IRDT)

Qarah Day (Persian: قره داي, also Romanized as Qarah Dāy and Qareh Dāy; also known as Qarā Dāy and Qara Deh) is a village in Pish Khowr Rural District, Pish Khowr District, Famenin County, Hamadan Province, Iran. At the 2006 census, its population was 254, in 52 families.
