= Taveh =

Village in Hamadan province, Iran

Taveh Persian: تاوه
- Village
- Location within Iran
- Coordinates: 35°07′00″N 49°01′36″E
- Country: Iran
- Province: Hamadan
- County: Famenin
- District: Central
- Rural District: Khorram Dasht

Population (2016)
  - Total: 1,024
- Time zone: UTC+3:30 (IRST)

Taveh (Persian: تاوه) (Note: Also romanized as Ţāveh and Tāweh) is a village in Khorram Dasht Rural District of the Central District in Famenin County, Hamadan province, Iran.

== Demographics ==
=== Population ===
At the time of the 2006 National Census, the village's population was 1,182 in 303 households, when it was in the former Famenin District of Hamadan County. The following census in 2011 counted 1,192 people in 381 households, by which time the district had been separated from the county in the establishment of Famenin County. The rural district was transferred to the new Central District. The 2016 census measured the population of the village as 1,024 people in 331 households.
