= Zarchu =

Zarchu (Persian: زارچو) may refer to:

- Zarchu, Bardsir
- Zarchu, Jiroft
