= Khimeh Gah, Hamadan =

Khimeh Gah خيمه گاه
- Village
- Country: Iran
- Province: Hamadan
- County: Famenin
- Bakhsh: Pish Khowr
- Rural District: Pish Khowr

Population (2006)
  - Total: 17
- Time zone: UTC+3:30 (IRST)
  - Summer (DST): UTC+4:30 (IRDT)

Khimeh Gah (Persian: خيمه گاه, also Romanized as Khīmeh Gāh) is a village in Pish Khowr Rural District, Pish Khowr District, Famenin County, Hamadan Province, Iran. At the 2006 census, its population was 17, in 6 families.
