= Qezelabad =

Qezelabad or Qazalabad (Persian: قزل اباد) may refer to:

- Qezelabad, East Azerbaijan
- Qezelabad, Famenin, Hamadan province
- Qezelabad, Qom
