= Zarchuiyeh =

Zarchuiyeh (Persian: زارچوئيه) may refer to:

- Zarchuiyeh, Golzar, Bardsir County
- Zarchuiyeh, Jiroft
