= Tajarak, Hamadan =

Village in Hamadan province, Iran

Tajarak Persian: تجرك
- Village
- Location within Iran
- Coordinates: 35°07′07″N 49°17′17″E
- Country: Iran
- Province: Hamadan
- County: Famenin
- District: Pish Khowr
- Rural District: Pish Khowr

Population (2016)
  - Total: 307
- Time zone: UTC+3:30 (IRST)

Tajarak (Persian: تجرك) (Note: Also known as Tajreh) is a village in Pish Khowr Rural District of Pish Khowr District in Famenin County, Hamadan province, Iran, serving as capital of both the district and the rural district.

== Demographics ==
=== Population ===
At the time of the 2006 National Census, the village's population was 153 in 41 households, when it was in the former Famenin District of Hamadan County. The following census in 2011 counted 295 people in 50 households, by which time the district had been separated from the county in the establishment of Famenin County. The rural district was transferred to the new Pish Khowr District. The 2016 census measured the population of the village as 307 people in 79 households.
