= Khimeh Gah =

Khimeh Gah (Persian: خيمه گاه) may refer to:

- Khimeh Gah, Hamadan
- Khimeh Gah, Khuzestan
