= Emamzadeh Pir Nahan =

Village in Hamadan province, Iran

Emamzadeh Pir Nahan Persian: امامزاده پيرنهان
- Village
- Location within Iran
- Coordinates: 35°00′41″N 49°02′28″E
- Country: Iran
- Province: Hamadan
- County: Famenin
- District: Central
- Rural District: Khorram Dasht

Population (2016)
  - Total: 599
- Time zone: UTC+3:30 (IRST)

Emamzadeh Pir Nahan (Persian: امامزاده پيرنهان) (Note: Also romanized as Emāmzādeh Pīr Nahān; also known as Pīr Nahān and Pīr Nehān) is a village in Khorram Dasht Rural District of the Central District in Famenin County, Hamadan province, Iran.

== Demographics ==
=== Population ===
At the time of the 2006 National Census, the village's population was 723 in 155 households, when it was in Jeyhun Dasht Rural District of Shara District in Hamadan County. The following census in 2011 counted 719 people in 188 households, by which time the village had been separated from the county in the establishment of Famenin County. It was transferred to Khorram Dasht Rural District in the new Central District. The 2016 census measured the population of the village as 599 people in 176 households.
