= Aznau =

Aznau (Persian: ازناو) may refer to:

- Aznau, Hamadan
- Aznau, Zanjan
