= Eznav, Famenin =

Eznav ازناو
- Village
- Location within Iran
- Coordinates: 35°12′25″N 49°22′53″E
- Country: Iran
- Province: Hamadan
- County: Famenin
- Bakhsh: Pish Khowr
- Rural District: Pish Khowr

Population (2006)
  - Total: 24
- Time zone: UTC+3:30 (IRST)
  - Summer (DST): UTC+4:30 (IRDT)

Eznav (Persian: ازناو, also Romanized as Eznāv and Aznāv; also known as Aznā’ū and Aznūb) is a village in Pish Khowr Rural District, Pish Khowr District, Famenin County, Hamadan Province, Iran. At the 2006 census, its population was 24, in 4 families.
