= Zardasht Rural District =

Rural district in Hamadan province, Iran

Zardasht Rural District Persian: دهستان زردشت
- Rural District
- Location within Iran
- Coordinates: 34°59′N 49°11′E
- Country: Iran
- Province: Hamadan
- County: Famenin
- District: Pish Khowr
- Established: 2009
- Capital: Khomajin

Population (2016)
  - Total: 5,116
- Time zone: UTC+3:30 (IRST)

Zardasht Rural District (Persian: دهستان زردشت) is in Pish Khowr District of Famenin County, Hamadan province, Iran. Its capital is the village of Khomajin.

== History ==
In 2009, Famenin District was separated from Hamadan County in the establishment of Famenin County, and Zardasht Rural District was created in the new Pish Khowr District.

== Demographics ==
=== Population ===
At the time of the 2011 National Census, the rural district's population was 5,950 in 1,591 households. The 2016 census measured the population of the rural district as 5,116 in 1,612 households. The most populous of its 15 villages was Qezelabad, with 1,005 people.

== Other villages in the rural district ==
- Khvoshabad
- Nasirabad
- Qaleh Juq
- Qezel Hesar
- Qushijeh
- Rastguyan
- Tamachi
- Zaraqan
- Zeraq
