= Sadeqlu =

Sadeqlu or Sadiqlu or Sediqlu (Persian: صادقلو) may refer to:

- Sadeqlu, Hamadan
- Sadeqlu, Isfahan
