= Eznav =

Eznav or Aznav (Persian: ازناو) may refer to:

- Eznav, Famenin
- Eznav, Malayer
