= Tamchi =

Tamchi may refer to:

- Tamchy, Kyrgyzstan
- Tamachi, Iran
