= Taweh =

Taweh can refer to:

- Taweh Creek, a stream in British Columbia, Canada
- Taveh, a village in Hamadan Province, Iran
