= Khimeh Gah, Khuzestan =

Khimeh Gah خيمه گاه
- Village
- Country: Iran
- Province: Khuzestan
- County: Izeh
- Bakhsh: Central
- Rural District: Pian

Population (2006)
  - Total: 33
- Time zone: UTC+3:30 (IRST)
  - Summer (DST): UTC+4:30 (IRDT)

Khimeh Gah (Persian: خيمه گاه, also Romanized as Khīmeh Gāh) is a village in Pian Rural District, in the Central District of Izeh County, Khuzestan Province, Iran. At the 2006 census, its population was 33, in 7 families.
