= Qarah Din =

Qarah Din قره دين
- Village
- Location within Iran
- Coordinates: 33°29′19″N 49°34′12″E
- Country: Iran
- Province: Lorestan
- County: Azna
- Bakhsh: Central
- Rural District: Pachehlak-e Gharbi

Population (2006)
  - Total: 63
- Time zone: UTC+3:30 (IRST)
  - Summer (DST): UTC+4:30 (IRDT)

Qarah Din (Persian: قره دين, also Romanized as Qarah Dīn and Qareh Dīn; also known as Qara Deh, Qarah Deh, and Qareh Deh) is a village in Pachehlak-e Gharbi Rural District, in the Central District of Azna County, Lorestan Province, Iran. At the 2006 census, its population was 63, in 14 families.
