= Famenin =

City in Hamadan province, Iran

Famenin Persian: فامنين
- City
- Location within Iran
- Coordinates: 35°06′50″N 48°58′21″E
- Country: Iran
- Province: Hamadan
- County: Famenin
- District: Central

Population (2016)
  - Total: 14,208
- Time zone: UTC+3:30 (IRST)

Famenin (Persian: فامنين) (Note: Also romanized as Fāmenīn and Fāmanīn; also known as Famīnīn) is a city in the Central District of Famenin County, Hamadan province, Iran, serving as capital of both the county and the district. It is also the administrative center for Khorram Dasht Rural District.

== Demographics ==
=== Language ===
Famenin is a predominately Azeri Turkic-speaking city at around 80%, the rest being standard Persian.

=== Population ===
At the time of the 2006 National Census, the city's population was 14,019 in 3,634 households, when it was capital of the former Famenin District in Hamadan County. The following census in 2011 counted 14,478 people in 4,329 households, by which time the district had been separated from the county in the establishment of Famenin County. The city and the rural district were transferred to the new Central District, with Famenin as the county's capital. The 2016 census measured the population of the city as 14,208 people in 4,498 households.

== Notable people ==
- Mohammad Mofatteh, Shia cleric
