= Zarchuiyeh-ye Do =

Zarchuiyeh-ye Do زارچوئيه2
- Village
- Location within Iran
- Coordinates: 29°14′21″N 57°10′08″E
- Country: Iran
- Province: Kerman
- County: Jiroft
- Bakhsh: Sarduiyeh
- Rural District: Sarduiyeh

Population (2006)
  - Total: 11
- Time zone: UTC+3:30 (IRST)
  - Summer (DST): UTC+4:30 (IRDT)

Zarchuiyeh-ye Do (Persian: زارچوئيه2, also Romanized as Zārchū’īyeh-ye Do; also known as Zārchū and Zārchū’īyeh) is a village in Sarduiyeh Rural District, Sarduiyeh District, Jiroft County, Kerman Province, Iran. At the 2006 census, its population was 11, in 6 families.
