= Zarchuiyeh, Golzar =

Zarchuiyeh زارچوئيه
- Village
- Location within Iran
- Coordinates: 29°35′48″N 57°17′19″E
- Country: Iran
- Province: Kerman
- County: Bardsir
- Bakhsh: Central
- Rural District: Golzar

Population (2006)
  - Total: 196
- Time zone: UTC+3:30 (IRST)
  - Summer (DST): UTC+4:30 (IRDT)

Zarchuiyeh (Persian: زارچوئيه, also Romanized as Zārchū’īyeh; also known as Chashmeh-i-Zarchu, Cheshmeh-ye Zarchū, Zārchū, and Zāreḩ) is a village in Golzar Rural District, in the Central District of Bardsir County, Kerman Province, Iran. At the 2006 census, its population was 196, in 36 families.
