= Khorram Dasht Rural District (Famenin County) =

Rural district in Hamadan province, Iran

Khorram Dasht Rural District Persian: دهستان خرم دشت
- Rural District
- Location within Iran
- Coordinates: 35°07′N 48°58′E
- Country: Iran
- Province: Hamadan
- County: Famenin
- District: Central
- Established: 1987
- Capital: Famenin

Population (2016)
  - Total: 11,498
- Time zone: UTC+3:30 (IRST)

Khorram Dasht Rural District (Persian: دهستان خرم دشت) is in the Central District of Famenin County, Hamadan province, Iran. It is administered from the city of Famenin.

== Demographics ==
=== Population ===
At the time of the 2006 National Census, the rural district's population (as a part of the former Famenin District in Hamadan County) was 14,050 in 3,308 households. There were 12,617 inhabitants in 3,617 households at the following census of 2011, by which time the district had been separated from the county in the establishment of Famenin County. The rural district was transferred to the new Central District. The 2016 census measured the population of the rural district as 11,498 in 3,478 households. The most populous of its 15 villages was Feyzabad, with 2,489 people.

=== Other villages in the rural district ===
- Aminabad
- Amirabad-e Ali Nur
- Ebrahimabad
- Emamzadeh Pir Nahan
- Hajjiabad
- Hameh Kasi
- Jahanabad
- Negar Khatun
- Sanaj
- Saravak
- Saray
- Tavaleh
- Taveh
