= Pish Khowr Rural District =

Rural district in Hamadan province, Iran

Pish Khowr Rural District Persian: دهستان پيشخور
- Rural District
- Location within Iran
- Coordinates: 35°07′N 49°19′E
- Country: Iran
- Province: Hamadan
- County: Famenin
- District: Pish Khowr
- Established: 1987
- Capital: Tajarak

Population (2016)
  - Total: 4,785
- Time zone: UTC+3:30 (IRST)

Pish Khowr Rural District (Persian: دهستان پيشخور) is in Pish Khowr District of Famenin County, Hamadan province, Iran. Its capital is the village of Tajarak.

== Demographics ==
=== Population ===
At the time of the 2006 National Census, the rural district's population (as a part of the former Famenin District in Hamadan County) was 4,327 in 1,141 households. There were 4,952 inhabitants in 1,457 households at the following census of 2011, by which time the district had been separated from the county in the establishment of Famenin County. The rural district was transferred to the new Pish Khowr District. The 2016 census measured the population of the rural district as 4,785 in 1,461 households. The most populous of its 46 villages was Yengejeh, with 577 people.

=== Other villages in the rural district ===
- Aghaj
- Ajorlu
- Chopoqlu
- Morghabad
- Pavan
- Qomshaneh
