= Mofatteh Rural District =

Rural district in Hamadan province, Iran

Mofatteh Rural District Persian: دهستان مفتح
- Rural District
- Location within Iran
- Coordinates: 35°11′N 49°07′E
- Country: Iran
- Province: Hamadan
- County: Famenin
- District: Central
- Capital: Asleh

Population (2016)
  - Total: 3,752
- Time zone: UTC+3:30 (IRST)

Mofatteh Rural District (Persian: دهستان مفتح) is in the Central District of Famenin County, Hamadan province, Iran. Its capital is the village of Asleh.

== Demographics ==
=== Population ===
At the time of the 2006 National Census, the rural district's population (as a part of the former Famenin District in Hamadan County) was 8,145 in 1,845 households. There were 4,488 inhabitants in 1,207 households at the following census of 2011, by which time the district had been separated from the county in the establishment of Famenin County. The rural district was transferred to the new Central District. The 2016 census measured its population as 3,752 in 1,133 households. The most populous of its seven villages was Asleh, with 2,093 people.

=== Other villages in the rural district ===
- Akleh
- Dehlaq
- Hesamabad
- Kalleh Sar
