= Pish Khowr District =

District in Hamadan province, Iran

Pish Khowr District Persian: بخش پیشخور
- District
- Location within Iran
- Coordinates: 35°03′N 49°12′E
- Country: Iran
- Province: Hamadan
- County: Famenin
- Established: 2009
- Capital: Tajarak

Population (2016)
  - Total: 9,901
- Time zone: UTC+3:30 (IRST)

Pish Khowr District (Persian: بخش پیشخور) is in Famenin County, Hamadan province, Iran. Its capital is the village of Tajarak.

== History ==
In 2009, Famenin District was separated from Hamadan County in the establishment of Famenin County, which was divided into two districts of two rural districts each, with Famenin as its capital and only city at the time.

== Demographics ==
=== Population ===
At the time of the 2011 National Census, the district's population was 10,902 in 3,048 households. The 2016 census measured the population of the district as 9,901 inhabitants in 3,073 households.

=== Administrative divisions ===
Pish Khowr District Population
Administrative Divisions	2011	2016
Pish Khowr RD	4,952	4,785
Zardasht RD	5,950	5,116
Total	10,902	9,901
RD = Rural District
