= Central District (Famenin County) =

District in Hamadan province, Iran

Central District (Famenin County) Persian: بخش مرکزی شهرستان فامنین
- District
- Location within Iran
- Coordinates: 35°08′N 49°01′E
- Country: Iran
- Province: Hamadan
- County: Famenin
- Established: 2009
- Capital: Famenin

Population (2016)
  - Total: 29,458
- Time zone: UTC+3:30 (IRST)

The Central District of Famenin County (Persian: بخش مرکزی شهرستان فامنین) is in Hamadan province, Iran. Its capital is the city of Famenin.

== History ==
In 2009, Famenin District was separated from Hamadan County in the establishment of Famenin County, which was divided into two districts of two rural districts each, with Famenin as its capital and only city at the time.

== Demographics ==
=== Population ===
At the time of the 2011 National Census, the district's population was 31,583 in 9,153 households. The 2016 census measured the population of the district as 29,458 inhabitants in 9,109 households.

Central District (Famenin County) Population
Administrative Divisions	2011	2016
Khorram Dasht RD	12,617	11,498
Mofatteh RD	4,488	3,752
Famenin (city)	14,478	14,208
Total	31,583	29,458
RD = Rural District
