= Famenin District =

Former district in Hamadan province, Iran

Famenin District Persian: بخش فامنین
- Former District
- Location within Iran
- Coordinates: 35°02′N 49°10′E
- Country: Iran
- Province: Hamadan
- County: Hamadan
- Established: 1980
- Capital: Famenin

Population (2006)
  - Total: 40,541
- Time zone: UTC+3:30 (IRST)

Famenin District (Persian: بخش فامنین) is a former administrative division of Hamadan County, Hamadan province, Iran. Its capital was the city of Famenin.

== History ==
In 2009, the district was separated from the county in the establishment of Famenin County.

== Demographics ==
=== Population ===
At the time of the 2006 census, the district's population was 40,541 in 9,928 households.

=== Administrative divisions ===
Famenin District Population
Administrative Divisions	2006
Khorram Dasht RD	14,050
Mofatteh RD	8,145
Pish Khowr RD	4,327
Famenin (city)	14,019
Total	40,541
RD = Rural District
