= Famenin County =

County in Hamadan province, Iran

Famenin County Persian: شهرستان فامنین
- County
- Location of Famenin County in Hamadan province (right, purple)

- Location of Hamadan province in Iran
- Coordinates: 35°02′N 49°10′E
- Country: Iran
- Province: Hamadan
- Established: 2009
- Capital: Famenin
- Districts: Central, Pish Khowr

Population (2016)
  - Total: 39,359
- Time zone: UTC+3:30 (IRST)

Famenin County (Persian: شهرستان فامنین) is in Hamadan province, Iran. Its capital is the city of Famenin.

== History ==
In 2009, Famenin District was separated from Hamadan County in the establishment of Famenin County, which was divided into two districts of two rural districts each, with Famenin as its capital and only city at the time.

== Demographics ==
=== Population ===
At the time of the 2011 National Census, the county's population was 42,485 people in 12,187 households. The 2016 census measured the population of the county as 39,359 in 12,182 households.

=== Administrative divisions ===
Famenin County's population history and administrative structure over two consecutive censuses are shown in the following table.

Famenin County Population
Administrative Divisions	2011	2016
Central District	31,583	29,458
Khorram Dasht RD	12,617	11,498
Mofatteh RD	4,488	3,752
Famenin (city)	14,478	14,208
Pish Khowr District	10,902	9,901
Pish Khowr RD	4,952	4,785
Zardasht RD	5,950	5,116
Total	42,485	39,359
RD = Rural District

== See also ==
Media related to Famenin County at Wikimedia Commons
