= Sangestan =

Sangestan or Sangistan (Persian: سنگستان) may refer to:

- Sangestan, Golestan
- Sangestan, Hamadan
- Sangestan, Kerman
- Sangestan, Markazi
- Sangestan Rural District, in Hamadan Province
