= Yeganeh =

Yeganeh, Yegana or Yagana (Persian: یگانه, romanized: Yegâne, Azerbaijani: Yeganə, Hindi: यगाना, romanized: Yagānā, Urdu: یگانہ, romanized: Yagāna, all coming from Persian word یگانه which means "unique, incomparable, matchless") may refer to:

- Yagana, pseudonym of Mirza Wajid Husain (1884–1956), Indian Urdu-language poet
- Yeganeh (name), a Persian and Azerbaijani feminine given name and an Iranian surname

== Places ==
- Yeganeh, Hamadan, a village in the Central District of Hamadan, Iran
- Yeganeh Mahalleh, a village in Gilan, Iran
