= Gara Choqa, Hamadan =

Village in Hamadan province, Iran

Gara Choqa Persian: گراچقا
- Village
- Location within Iran
- Coordinates: 34°51′19″N 48°31′08″E
- Country: Iran
- Province: Hamadan
- County: Hamadan
- District: Central
- Rural District: Hegmataneh

Population (2016)
  - Total: 2,299
- Time zone: UTC+3:30 (IRST)

Gara Choqa (Persian: گراچقا) (Note: Also romanized as Gara Cheqa, Garā Cheqā, Garā Choqā, and Garacheqā; also known as Gara Chegha) is a village in Hegmataneh Rural District of the Central District in Hamadan County, Hamadan province, Iran.

== Demographics ==
=== Population ===
At the time of the 2006 National Census, the village's population was 2,252 in 561 households. The following census in 2011 counted 2,354 people in 680 households. The 2016 census measured the population of the village as 2,299 people in 725 households.
