= Silvar =

Village in Hamadan province, Iran

Silvar Persian: سيلوار
- Village
- Location within Iran
- Coordinates: 34°44′45″N 48°30′25″E
- Country: Iran
- Province: Hamadan
- County: Hamadan
- District: Central
- Rural District: Abaru

Population (2016)
  - Total: 282
- Time zone: UTC+3:30 (IRST)

Silvar (Persian: سيلوار) (Note: Also romanized as Sīlvār) is a village in Abaru Rural District of the Central District in Hamadan County, Hamadan province, Iran.

== Demographics ==
=== Population ===
At the time of the 2006 National Census, the village's population was 373 in 104 households. The following census in 2011 counted 367 people in 117 households. The 2016 census measured the population of the village as 282 people in 98 households.
