= Sorkhabad, Hamadan =

Village in Hamadan province, Iran

Sorkhabad Persian: سرخ اباد
- Village
- Location within Iran
- Coordinates: 34°49′40″N 48°38′06″E
- Country: Iran
- Province: Hamadan
- County: Hamadan
- District: Central
- Rural District: Sangestan

Population (2016)
  - Total: 1,075
- Time zone: UTC+3:30 (IRST)

Sorkhabad (Persian: سرخ اباد) (Note: Also romanized as Sorkhābād; also known as Surkhābād) is a village in Sangestan Rural District of the Central District in Hamadan County, Hamadan province, Iran.

== Demographics ==
=== Population ===
At the time of the 2006 National Census, the village's population was 1,414 in 350 households. The following census in 2011 counted 1,376 people in 384 households. The 2016 census measured the population of the village as 1,075 people in 336 households.
