= Tafrijan =

Village in Hamadan province, Iran

Tafrijan Persian: تفريجان
- Village
- Location within Iran
- Coordinates: 34°45′45″N 48°34′46″E
- Country: Iran
- Province: Hamadan
- County: Hamadan
- District: Central
- Rural District: Alvandkuh-e Sharqi

Population (2016)
  - Total: 2,149
- Time zone: UTC+3:30 (IRST)

Tafrijan (Persian: تفريجان) (Note: Also romanized as Tafrījān) is a village in, and the capital of, Alvandkuh-e Sharqi Rural District in the Central District of Hamadan County, Hamadan province, Iran.

== Demographics ==
=== Population ===
At the time of the 2006 National Census, the village's population was 2,134 in 609 households. The following census in 2011 counted 2,149 people in 691 households. The 2016 census measured the population of the village as 2,149 people in 691 households.
