= Varkaneh =

Village in Hamadan province, Iran

Varkaneh Persian: وركانه
- Village
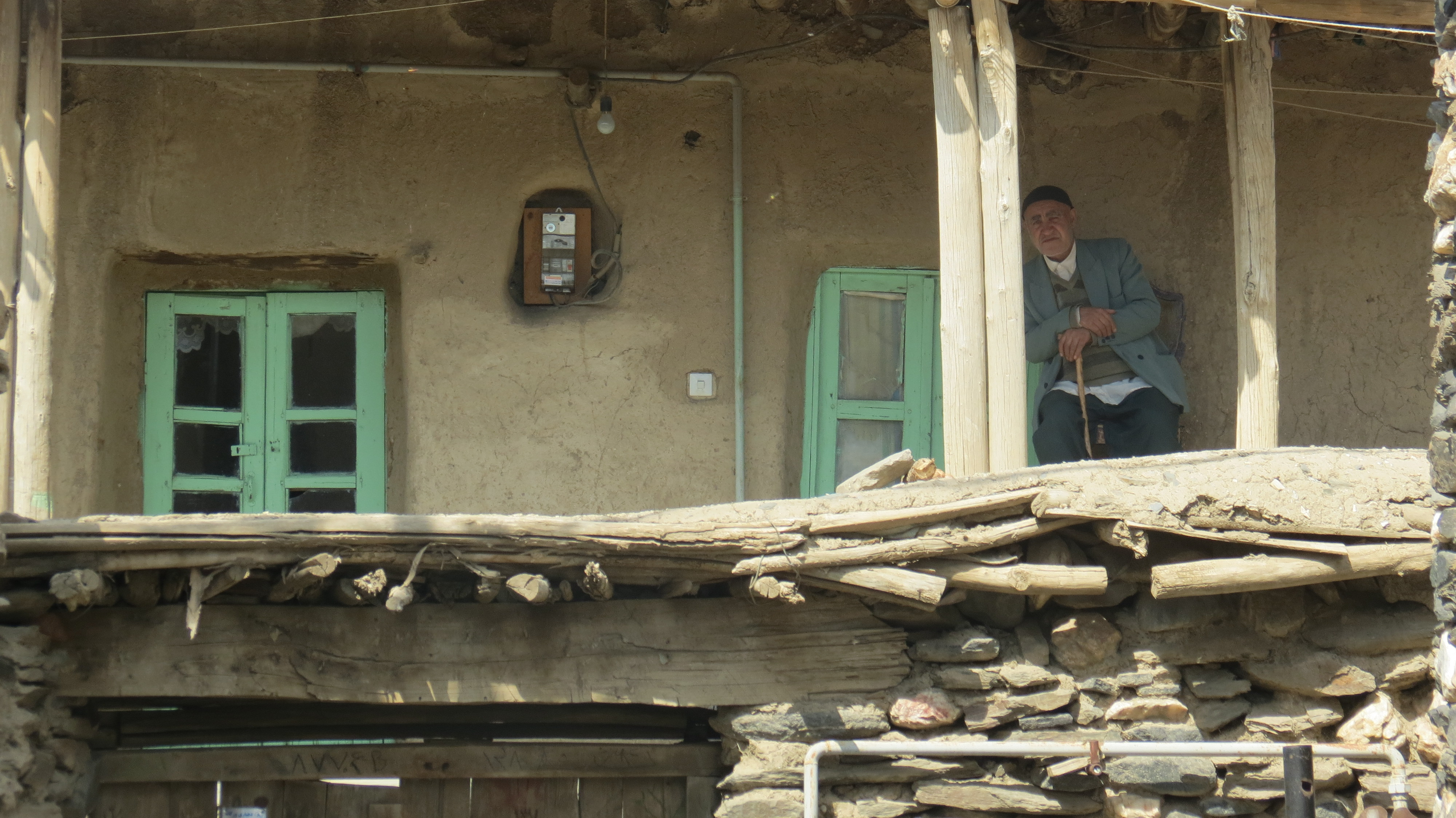
- A house in the village of Varkaneh

- Location within Iran
- Coordinates: 34°40′37″N 48°37′09″E
- Country: Iran
- Province: Hamadan
- County: Hamadan
- District: Central
- Rural District: Alvandkuh-e Sharqi

Population (2016)
  - Total: 713
- Time zone: UTC+3:30 (IRST)

Varkaneh (Persian: وركانه) (Note: Also romanized as Varkāneh) is a village in Alvandkuh-e Sharqi Rural District of the Central District in Hamadan County, Hamadan province, Iran.

== Etymology ==
The name Varkaneh is ultimately derived from Old Iranian *varkānaka-, itself from Proto-Iranian *wr̥kāna-, and ultimately sharing an etymology with Varkāna, the Old Persian name of the province of Hyrcania.

== Demographics ==
=== Population ===
At the time of the 2006 National Census, the village's population was 848 in 196 households. The following census in 2011 counted 800 people in 219 households. The 2016 census measured the population of the village as 713 people in 201 households.

== Notable people ==
- Tofy Mussivand, Iranian-Canadian medical engineer
