= Bahramabad, Hamadan =

Village in Hamadan province, Iran

Bahramabad Persian: بهرام اباد
- Village
- Location within Iran
- Coordinates: 34°54′52″N 48°30′40″E
- Country: Iran
- Province: Hamadan
- County: Hamadan
- District: Central
- Rural District: Hegmataneh

Population (2016)
  - Total: 4,731
- Time zone: UTC+3:30 (IRST)

Bahramabad (Persian: بهرام اباد) (Note: Also romanized as Bahrāmābād; also known as Yegeh Mold, Yengeh Molk, and Yengī Molk) is a village in Hegmataneh Rural District of the Central District in Hamadan County, Hamadan province, Iran.

== Demographics ==
=== Population ===
At the time of the 2006 National Census, the village's population was 220 in 54 households. The following census in 2011 counted 226 people in 65 households. The 2016 census measured the population of the village as 4,731 people in 67 households.
