= Baraband =

Village in Hamadan province, Iran

Baraband Persian: بارابند
- Village
- Location within Iran
- Coordinates: 34°45′07″N 48°47′55″E
- Country: Iran
- Province: Hamadan
- County: Hamadan
- District: Central
- Rural District: Gonbad

Population (2016)
  - Total: 128
- Time zone: UTC+3:30 (IRST)

Baraband (Persian: بارابند) (Note: Also romanized as Bārāband; also known as Bahrāband, Barāvand, and Bārband) is a village in Gonbad Rural District of the Central District in Hamadan County, Hamadan province, Iran.

== Demographics ==
=== Population ===
At the time of the 2006 National Census, the village's population was 259 in 62 households. The following census in 2011 counted 171 people in 51 households. The 2016 census measured the population of the village as 128 people in 43 households.
