= Khaku =

Village in Hamadan province, Iran

Khaku Persian: خاكو
- Village
- Location within Iran
- Coordinates: 34°43′35″N 48°32′12″E
- Country: Iran
- Province: Hamadan
- County: Hamadan
- District: Central
- Rural District: Abaru

Population (2016)
  - Total: 359
- Time zone: UTC+3:30 (IRST)

Khaku (Persian: خاكو) (Note: Also romanized as Khākū) is a village in Abaru Rural District of the Central District in Hamadan County, Hamadan province, Iran.

== Demographics ==
=== Population ===
At the time of the 2006 National Census, the village's population was 448 in 112 households. The following census in 2011 counted 415 people in 118 households. The 2016 census measured the population of the village as 359 people in 113 households.
