= Ab Hendu =

Village in Hamadan province, Iran

Ab Hendu Persian: ابهندو
- Village
- Location within Iran
- Coordinates: 34°43′42″N 48°49′30″E
- Country: Iran
- Province: Hamadan
- County: Hamadan
- District: Central
- Rural District: Gonbad

Population (2016)
  - Total: 147
- Time zone: UTC+3:30 (IRST)

Ab Hendu (Persian: ابهندو) (Note: Also romanized as Ab Hendoo, Āb Hendū, and Ābhendū; also known as Āb Hadīr, Āb Hendī, Āb-e Hendī, and Āb-i-Hindi) is a village in Gonbad Rural District of the Central District in Hamadan County, Hamadan province, Iran.

== Demographics ==
=== Population ===
At the time of the 2006 National Census, the village's population was 223 in 44 households. The following census in 2011 counted 161 people in 43 households. The 2016 census measured the population of the village as 147 people in 42 households.
