= Gol-e Kahriz =

Village in Hamadan province, Iran

Gol-e Kahriz Persian: گل کهريز
- Village
- Location within Iran
- Coordinates: 34°43′02″N 48°46′24″E
- Country: Iran
- Province: Hamadan
- County: Hamadan
- District: Central
- Rural District: Gonbad

Population (2016)
  - Total: 240
- Time zone: UTC+3:30 (IRST)

Gol-e Kahriz (Persian: گل کهريز) (Note: Also romanized as Gol-e Kahrīz; formerly known as Kur Kahriz (كوركهريز), also romanized as Kūr Kahrīz and Kūr-e Kahrīz; also known as Gūr-e Kahrīz, Kūr-e Kārīz, and Kūrkārīz) is a village in Gonbad Rural District of the Central District in Hamadan County, Hamadan province, Iran.

== Demographics ==
=== Population ===
At the time of the 2006 National Census, the village's population, as Kur Kahriz, was 443 in 96 households. The following census in 2011 counted 306 people in 82 households, by which time the village was listed as Gol-e Kahriz. The 2016 census measured the population of the village as 240 people in 79 households.
