= Yekanabad =

Village in Hamadan province, Iran

Yekanabad Persian: يكن اباد
- Village
- Location within Iran
- Coordinates: 34°52′20″N 48°27′14″E
- Country: Iran
- Province: Hamadan
- County: Hamadan
- District: Central
- Rural District: Alvandkuh-e Gharbi

Population (2016)
  - Total: 2,832
- Time zone: UTC+3:30 (IRST)

Yekanabad (Persian: یکن‌آباد) (Note: Also romanized as Yekanābād; also known as Yeganābād, Yegnābād, and Yengābād) is a village in Alvandkuh-e Gharbi Rural District of the Central District in Hamadan County, Hamadan province, Iran.

== Demographics ==
=== Population ===
At the time of the 2006 National Census, the village's population was 2,824 in 691 households. The following census in 2011 counted 3,267 people in 920 households. The 2016 census measured the population of the village as 2,832 people in 857 households.
