= Yeganeh, Hamadan =

Yeganeh يگانه
- Village
- Location within Iran
- Coordinates: 34°48′26″N 48°38′16″E
- Country: Iran
- Province: Hamadan
- County: Hamadan
- Bakhsh: Central
- Rural District: Sangestan

Population (2006)
  - Total: 427
- Time zone: UTC+3:30 (IRST)
  - Summer (DST): UTC+4:30 (IRDT)

Yeganeh (Persian: يگانه, also Romanized as Yegāneh; also known as Yekāneh) is a village in Sangestan Rural District, in the Central District of Hamadan County, Hamadan Province, Iran. At the 2006 census, its population was 427, in 115 families.
