= Heyran, Hamadan =

Village in Hamadan province, Iran

Heyran Persian: حيران
- Village
- Location within Iran
- Coordinates: 34°48′27″N 48°51′10″E
- Country: Iran
- Province: Hamadan
- County: Hamadan
- District: Central
- Rural District: Gonbad

Population (2016)
  - Total: 448
- Time zone: UTC+3:30 (IRST)

Heyran (Persian: حيران) (Note: Also romanized as Ḩeyrān; also known as Hairān) is a village in Gonbad Rural District of the Central District in Hamadan County, Hamadan province, Iran.

== Demographics ==
=== Population ===
At the time of the 2006 National Census, the village's population was 513 in 124 households. The following census in 2011 counted 524 people in 138 households. The 2016 census measured the population of the village as 448 people in 140 households.
