= Abshineh =

Village in Hamadan province, Iran

Abshineh Persian: ابشينه
- Village
- Location within Iran
- Coordinates: 34°46′48″N 48°36′46″E
- Country: Iran
- Province: Hamadan
- County: Hamadan
- District: Central
- Rural District: Sangestan

Population (2016)
  - Total: 1,429
- Time zone: UTC+3:30 (IRST)

Abshineh (Persian: ابشينه) (Note: Also romanized as Ābshīneh) is a village in, and the capital of, Sangestan Rural District in the Central District of Hamadan County, Hamadan province, Iran.

== Etymology ==
The name Ābshīneh is derived from Western Middle Iranian *āp-šēnag, which ultimately comes from Proto-Iranian *āp- + *xšaina- + *-ka-. The first element means "water", and the second means "shiny". Thus, the name Ābshīneh originally meant "a place where the water shines".

== Demographics ==
=== Population ===
At the time of the 2006 National Census, the village's population was 1,356 in 372 households. The following census in 2011 counted 1,425 people in 417 households. The 2016 census measured the population of the village as 1,429 people in 427 households.
