= Yalfan =

Village in Hamadan province, Iran

Yalfan Persian: يلفان
- Village
- Location within Iran
- Coordinates: 34°44′11″N 48°36′40″E
- Country: Iran
- Province: Hamadan
- County: Hamadan
- District: Central
- Rural District: Alvandkuh-e Sharqi

Population (2016)
  - Total: 172
- Time zone: UTC+3:30 (IRST)

Yalfan (Persian: يلفان) (Note: Also romanized as Yalfān; also known as Yalpān) is a village in Alvandkuh-e Sharqi Rural District of the Central District in Hamadan County, Hamadan province, Iran.

== Demographics ==
=== Population ===
At the time of the 2006 National Census, the village's population was 536 in 174 households. The following census in 2011 counted 281 people in 96 households. The 2016 census measured the population of the village as 172 people in 56 households.
