= Mehdiabad, Alvandkuh-e Gharbi =

Village in Hamadan province, Iran

Mehdiabad Persian: مهدي اباد
- Village
- Location within Iran
- Coordinates: 34°51′40″N 48°26′53″E
- Country: Iran
- Province: Hamadan
- County: Hamadan
- District: Central
- Rural District: Alvandkuh-e Gharbi

Population (2016)
  - Total: 2,295
- Time zone: UTC+3:30 (IRST)

Mehdiabad (Persian: مهدي اباد) (Note: Also romanized as Mehdīābād; also known as Tāzeh Kand) is a village in Alvandkuh-e Gharbi Rural District of the Central District in Hamadan County, Hamadan province, Iran.

== Demographics ==
=== Population ===
At the time of the 2006 National Census, the village's population was 1,303 in 320 households. The following census in 2011 counted 1,908 people in 526 households. The 2016 census measured the population of the village as 2,295 people in 659 households.
