= Amzajerd =

Village in Hamadan province, Iran

Amzajerd Persian: امزاجرد
- Village
- Location within Iran
- Coordinates: 34°56′12″N 48°31′57″E
- Country: Iran
- Province: Hamadan
- County: Hamadan
- District: Central
- Rural District: Hegmataneh

Population (2016)
  - Total: 3,028
- Time zone: UTC+3:30 (IRST)

Amzajerd (Persian: امزاجرد) (Note: Also romanized as Amzājard and Amzājerd) is a village in Hegmataneh Rural District of the Central District in Hamadan County, Hamadan province, Iran.

== Demographics ==
=== Population ===
At the time of the 2006 National Census, the village's population was 2,916 in 749 households. The following census in 2011 counted 6,564 people in 856 households. The 2016 census measured the population of the village as 3,028 people in 858 households.
