= Sadd-e Ekbatan =

Village in Hamadan province, Iran

Sadd-e Ekbatan Persian: سداكباتان
- Village
- Location within Iran
- Coordinates: 34°45′30″N 48°36′00″E
- Country: Iran
- Province: Hamadan
- County: Hamadan
- District: Central
- Rural District: Alvandkuh-e Sharqi

Population (2016)
  - Total: 0
- Time zone: UTC+3:30 (IRST)

Sadd-e Ekbatan (Persian: سداكباتان) (Note: Also romanized as Sadd-e Ekbātān; also known as Sadd-e Shahnāz) is a village in Alvandkuh-e Sharqi Rural District of the Central District in Hamadan County, Hamadan province, Iran.

== Demographics ==
=== Population ===
At the time of the 2006 National Census, the village's population was 207 in seven households. The following census in 2011 counted a population below the reporting threshold. The 2016 census measured the population of the village as zero.
