= Neshar =

Village in Hamadan province, Iran

Neshar Persian: نشر
- Village
- Location within Iran
- Coordinates: 34°40′38″N 48°52′01″E
- Country: Iran
- Province: Hamadan
- County: Hamadan
- District: Central
- Rural District: Gonbad

Population (2016)
  - Total: 258
- Time zone: UTC+3:30 (IRST)

Neshar (Persian: نشر) (Note: Also romanized as Nashar; also known as Nishār and Noh Shahreh) is a village in Gonbad Rural District of the Central District in Hamadan County, Hamadan province, Iran.

== Demographics ==
=== Population ===
At the time of the 2006 National Census, the village's population was 445 in 107 households. The following census in 2011 counted 226 people in 66 households. The 2016 census measured the population of the village as 258 people in 75 households.
