= Robat-e Sheverin =

Village in Hamadan province, Iran

Robat-e Sheverin Persian: رباط شورين
- Village
- Location within Iran
- Coordinates: 34°51′40″N 48°36′02″E
- Country: Iran
- Province: Hamadan
- County: Hamadan
- District: Central
- Rural District: Hegmataneh

Population (2016)
  - Total: 1,255
- Time zone: UTC+3:30 (IRST)

Robat-e Sheverin (Persian: رباط شورين) (Note: Also romanized as Robāţ-e Shavarīn, Robāţ-e Sheverīn, and Robāţ-e Shūrīn; also known as Robāţ) is a village in Hegmataneh Rural District of the Central District in Hamadan County, Hamadan province, Iran.

== Demographics ==
=== Population ===
At the time of the 2006 National Census, the village's population was 968 in 201 households. The following census in 2011 counted 1,190 people in 336 households. The 2016 census measured the population of the village as 1,255 people in 376 households.
