= Qoli Kandi, Hamadan =

Village in Hamadan province, Iran

Qoli Kandi Persian: قلي كندي
- Village
- Location within Iran
- Coordinates: 34°40′40″N 48°42′57″E
- Country: Iran
- Province: Hamadan
- County: Hamadan
- District: Central
- Rural District: Gonbad

Population (2016)
  - Total: 59
- Time zone: UTC+3:30 (IRST)

Qoli Kandi (Persian: قلي كندي) (Note: Also romanized as Qolī Kandī) is a village in Gonbad Rural District of the Central District in Hamadan County, Hamadan province, Iran.

== Demographics ==
=== Population ===
At the time of the 2006 National Census, the village's population was 90 in 17 households. The following census in 2011 counted 83 people in 25 households. The 2016 census measured the population of the village as 59 people in 20 households.
