= Qeshlaq-e Gomar =

Village in Hamadan province, Iran

Qeshlaq-e Gomar Persian: قشلاق گمار
- Village
- Location within Iran
- Coordinates: 34°55′20″N 48°42′03″E
- Country: Iran
- Province: Hamadan
- County: Hamadan
- District: Central
- Rural District: Hegmataneh

Population (2016)
  - Total: 64
- Time zone: UTC+3:30 (IRST)

Qeshlaq-e Gomar (Persian: قشلاق گمار) (Note: Also romanized as Qeshlāq-e Gomār) is a village in Hegmataneh Rural District of the Central District in Hamadan County, Hamadan province, Iran.

== Demographics ==
=== Population ===
At the time of the 2006 National Census, the village's population was 55 in 10 households. The 2016 census measured the population of the village as 64 people in 17 households.
