= Deh Piaz =

Village in Hamadan province, Iran

Deh Piaz Persian: ده پياز
- Village
- Location within Iran
- Coordinates: 34°52′51″N 48°30′57″E
- Country: Iran
- Province: Hamadan
- County: Hamadan
- District: Central
- Rural District: Hegmataneh

Population (2016)
  - Total: 4,203
- Time zone: UTC+3:30 (IRST)

Deh Piaz (Persian: ده پياز) (Note: Also romanized as Deh Peyāz, Deh Pīāz, and Deh Pīyāz) is a village in Hegmataneh Rural District of the Central District in Hamadan County, Hamadan province, Iran.

== Demographics ==
=== Population ===
At the time of the 2006 National Census, the village's population was 4,078 in 902 households. The following census in 2011 counted 4,614 people in 1,251 households. The 2016 census measured the population of the village as 4,203 people in 1,231 households.
