= Shamsabad, Alvandkuh-e Sharqi =

Village in Hamadan province, Iran

Shamsabad Persian: شمس اباد
- Village
- Location within Iran
- Coordinates: 34°41′57″N 48°37′04″E
- Country: Iran
- Province: Hamadan
- County: Hamadan
- District: Central
- Rural District: Alvandkuh-e Sharqi

Population (2016)
  - Total: 146
- Time zone: UTC+3:30 (IRST)

Shamsabad (Persian: شمس اباد) (Note: Also romanized as Shamsābād) is a village in Alvandkuh-e Sharqi Rural District of the Central District in Hamadan County, Hamadan province, Iran.

== Demographics ==
=== Population ===
At the time of the 2006 National Census, the village's population was 101 in 29 households. The following census in 2011 counted 100 people in 29 households. The 2016 census measured the population of the village as 146 people in 42 households.
