= Solulan =

Village in Hamadan province, Iran

Solulan Persian: سلولان
- Village
- Location within Iran
- Coordinates: 34°49′32″N 48°25′48″E
- Country: Iran
- Province: Hamadan
- County: Hamadan
- District: Central
- Rural District: Alvandkuh-e Gharbi

Population (2016)
  - Total: 3,236
- Time zone: UTC+3:30 (IRST)

Solulan (Persian: سلولان) (Note: Also romanized as Selūlān and Solūlān; also known as Sūlān and Sūrūlān) is a village in Alvandkuh-e Gharbi Rural District of the Central District in Hamadan County, Hamadan province, Iran.

== Demographics ==
=== Population ===
At the time of the 2006 National Census, the village's population was 3,118 in 830 households. The following census in 2011 counted 3,281 people in 1,030 households. The 2016 census measured the population of the village as 3,236 people in 1,073 households, the most populous in its rural district.
