= Dingeleh Kahriz =

Village in Hamadan province, Iran

Dingeleh Kahriz Persian: دينگله كهريز
- Village
- Location within Iran
- Coordinates: 34°48′40″N 48°41′07″E
- Country: Iran
- Province: Hamadan
- County: Hamadan
- District: Central
- Rural District: Sangestan

Population (2016)
  - Total: 381
- Time zone: UTC+3:30 (IRST)

Dingeleh Kahriz (Persian: دينگله كهريز) (Note: Also romanized as Dīngeleh Kahrīz and Dīngleh Kahrīz; also known as Dengeleh Kahrīz) is a village in Sangestan Rural District of the Central District in Hamadan County, Hamadan province, Iran.

== Demographics ==
=== Population ===
At the time of the 2006 National Census, the village's population was 460 in 121 households. The following census in 2011 counted 421 people in 126 households. The 2016 census measured the population of the village as 381 people in 120 households.
