= Aliabad-e Posht Shahr =

Neighborhood in Hamadan province, Iran

Aliabad-e Posht Shahr Persian: علي ابادپشتشهر
- Neighborhood
- Location within Iran
- Coordinates: 34°50′17″N 48°30′39″E
- Country: Iran
- Province: Hamadan
- County: Hamadan
- District: Central
- City: Hamadan

Population (2016)
  - Total: 7,759
- Time zone: UTC+3:30 (IRST)

Aliabad-e Posht Shahr (Persian: علي ابادپشتشهر) (Note: Also romanized as ‘Alīābād-e Posht Shahr and ‘Alīābād-e Posht-e Shahr; also known as Alīābād, ‘Alīābād, and ‘Alīābād-e Posht) is a neighborhood in the city of Hamadan in the Central District of Hamadan County, Hamadan province, Iran.

== Demographics ==
=== Population ===
At the time of the 2006 National Census, Aliabad-e Posht Shahr's population was 4,453 in 1,137 households, when it was a village in Hegmataneh Rural District. The following census in 2011 counted 6,540 people in 1,987 households. The 2016 census measured the population of the village as 7,759 people in 2,460 households.

Aliabad-e Posht Shahr was annexed by the city of Hamadan in 2019.
