= Vafr-e Jin =

Village in Hamadan province, Iran

Vafr-e Jin Persian: وفرجين
- Village
- Location within Iran
- Coordinates: 34°48′37″N 48°23′03″E
- Country: Iran
- Province: Hamadan
- County: Hamadan
- District: Central
- Rural District: Alvandkuh-e Gharbi

Population (2016)
  - Total: 1,665
- Time zone: UTC+3:30 (IRST)

Vafr-e Jin (Persian: وفرجين) (Note: Also romanized as Vafr-e Jīn) is a village in Alvandkuh-e Gharbi Rural District of the Central District in Hamadan County, Hamadan province, Iran.

== Demographics ==
=== Population ===
At the time of the 2006 National Census, the village's population was 1,445 in 392 households. The following census in 2011 counted 1,622 people in 436 households. The 2016 census measured the population of the village as 1,665 people in 486 households.
