= Qasemabad, Hamadan =

Neighborhood in Hamadan province, Iran

Qasemabad Persian: قاسم اباد
- Neighborhood
- Location within Iran
- Coordinates: 34°49′48″N 48°31′56″E
- Country: Iran
- Province: Hamadan
- County: Hamadan
- District: Central
- City: Hamadan

Population (2016)
  - Total: 8,125
- Time zone: UTC+3:30 (IRST)

Qasemabad (Persian: قاسم اباد) (Note: Also romanized as Qāsemābād; also known as Qāsimābād) is a neighborhood in the city of Hamadan in the Central District of Hamadan County, Hamadan province, Iran.

== Demographics ==
=== Population ===
At the time of the 2006 National Census, Qasemabad's population was 5,661 in 1,147 households, when it was a village in, and the capital of, Hegmataneh Rural District. The following census in 2011 counted 8,382 people in 2,394 households. The 2016 census measured the population of the village as 8,125 people in 2,574 households, the most populous in its rural district.

== In literature ==
The 14th-century author Hamdallah Mustawfi listed Qasemabad as one of the main villages in the Farivar district under Hamadan.

Qasemabad was annexed by the city of Hamadan in 2019.
