= Mahbar =

Village in Hamadan province, Iran

Mahbar Persian: مهبار
- Village
- Location within Iran
- Coordinates: 34°52′34″N 48°48′28″E
- Country: Iran
- Province: Hamadan
- County: Hamadan
- District: Central
- Rural District: Sangestan

Population (2016)
  - Total: 329
- Time zone: UTC+3:30 (IRST)

Mahbar (Persian: مهبار) (Note: Also romanized as Mahbār) is a village in Sangestan Rural District of the Central District in Hamadan County, Hamadan province, Iran.

== Demographics ==
=== Population ===
At the time of the 2006 National Census, the village's population was 306 in 68 households. The following census in 2011 counted 358 people in 75 households. The 2016 census measured the population of the village as 329 people in 78 households.
