= Konjineh =

Village in Hamadan province, Iran

Konjineh Persian: كنجينه
- Village
- Location within Iran
- Coordinates: 34°47′32″N 48°37′48″E
- Country: Iran
- Province: Hamadan
- County: Hamadan
- District: Central
- Rural District: Sangestan

Population (2016)
  - Total: 716
- Time zone: UTC+3:30 (IRST)

Konjineh (Persian: كنجينه) (Note: Also romanized as Konjīneh; also known as Ganjīneh, Kanjīna, and Kanjīyeh) is a village in Sangestan Rural District of the Central District in Hamadan County, Hamadan province, Iran.

== Demographics ==
=== Population ===
At the time of the 2006 National Census, the village's population was 760 in 206 households. The following census in 2011 counted 750 people in 238 households. The 2016 census measured the population of the village as 716 people in 228 households.
