= Tuyijin =

Village in Hamadan province, Iran

Tuyijin Persian: توييجين
- Village
- Location within Iran
- Coordinates: 34°49′28″N 48°24′36″E
- Country: Iran
- Province: Hamadan
- County: Hamadan
- District: Central
- Rural District: Alvandkuh-e Gharbi

Population (2016)
  - Total: 1,555
- Time zone: UTC+3:30 (IRST)

Tuyijin (Persian: توييجين) (Note: Also romanized as Too’ijin and Tū’ī Jīn; also known as Tarjīn, Tui Jin, and Tū’īn) is a village in Alvandkuh-e Gharbi Rural District of the Central District in Hamadan County, Hamadan province, Iran.

== Demographics ==
=== Population ===
At the time of the 2006 National Census, the village's population was 1,496 in 427 households. The following census in 2011 counted 1,617 people in 465 households. The 2016 census measured the population of the village as 1,555 people in 504 households.
