= Heydareh-ye Balai-ye Shahr =

Village in Hamadan province, Iran

Heydareh-ye Balai-ye Shahr Persian: حيدره بالاي شهر
- Village
- Location within Iran
- Coordinates: 34°48′08″N 48°27′27″E
- Country: Iran
- Province: Hamadan
- County: Hamadan
- District: Central
- Rural District: Alvandkuh-e Gharbi

Population (2016)
  - Total: 1,004
- Time zone: UTC+3:30 (IRST)

Heydareh-ye Balai-ye Shahr (Persian: حيدره بالاي شهر) (Note: Also romanized as Heydareh-ye Bālāī-ye Shahr; formerly known as Heydareh-ye Posht-e Shahr (حيدره پشتشهر), also romanized as Ḩeydareh-ye Posht-e Shahr; also known as Ḩeydar-e Posht-e Shahr and Ḩeydareh) is a village in Alvandkuh-e Gharbi Rural District of the Central District in Hamadan County, Hamadan province, Iran.

== Demographics ==
=== Population ===
At the time of the 2006 National Census, the village's population, as Heydareh-ye Posht-e Shahr, was 1,232 in 352 households. The following census in 2011 counted 1,145 people in 355 households, by which time the village was listed as Heydareh-ye Balai-ye Shahr. The 2016 census measured the population of the village as 1,004 people in 345 households.
