= Aliabad-e Varkaneh =

Village in Hamadan province, Iran

Aliabad-e Varkaneh Persian: علي ابادوركانه
- Village
- Location within Iran
- Coordinates: 34°41′33″N 48°37′53″E
- Country: Iran
- Province: Hamadan
- County: Hamadan
- District: Central
- Rural District: Alvandkuh-e Sharqi

Population (2016)
  - Total: 105
- Time zone: UTC+3:30 (IRST)

Aliabad-e Varkaneh (Persian: علي ابادوركانه) (Note: Also romanized as ‘Alīābād-e Varkāneh; also known as ‘Alīābād) is a village in Alvandkuh-e Sharqi Rural District of the Central District in Hamadan County, Hamadan province, Iran.

== Demographics ==
=== Population ===
At the time of the 2006 National Census, the village's population was 162 in 46 households. The following census in 2011 counted 127 people in 44 households. The 2016 census measured the population of the village as 105 people in 43 households.
