= Gonbad, Hamadan =

Village in Hamadan province, Iran

Gonbad Persian: گنبد
- Village
- Location within Iran
- Coordinates: 34°40′59″N 48°44′44″E
- Country: Iran
- Province: Hamadan
- County: Hamadan
- District: Central
- Rural District: Gonbad

Population (2016)
  - Total: 1,654
- Time zone: UTC+3:30 (IRST)

Gonbad (Persian: گنبد) is a village in, and the capital of, Gonbad Rural District in the Central District of Hamadan County, Hamadan province, Iran.

== Demographics ==
=== Population ===
At the time of the 2006 National Census, the village's population was 1,844 in 420 households. The following census in 2011 counted 1,716 people in 502 households. The 2016 census measured the population of the village as 1,654 people in 509 households, the most populous in its rural district.
