= Tekmeh Dash, Hamadan =

Village in Hamadan province, Iran

Tekmeh Dash Persian: تكمه داش
- Village
- Location within Iran
- Coordinates: 34°37′09″N 48°39′44″E
- Country: Iran
- Province: Hamadan
- County: Hamadan
- District: Central
- Rural District: Alvandkuh-e Sharqi

Population (2016)
  - Total: 61
- Time zone: UTC+3:30 (IRST)

Tekmeh Dash (Persian: تكمه داش) (Note: Also romanized as Tekmeh Dāsh, Tokmeh Dash, and Tokmeh Dāsh; also known as Tekmadāsh and Tokmeh Dānsh) is a village in Alvandkuh-e Sharqi Rural District of the Central District in Hamadan County, Hamadan province, Iran.

== Demographics ==
=== Population ===
At the time of the 2006 National Census, the village's population was 54 in 13 households. The following census in 2011 counted 49 people in 14 households. The 2016 census measured the population of the village as 61 people in 21 households.
