= Arablu, Hamadan =

Village in Hamadan province, Iran

Arablu Persian: عربلو
- Village
- Location within Iran
- Coordinates: 34°49′29″N 48°45′48″E
- Country: Iran
- Province: Hamadan
- County: Hamadan
- District: Central
- Rural District: Sangestan

Population (2016)
  - Total: 361
- Time zone: UTC+3:30 (IRST)

Arablu (Persian: عربلو) (Note: Also romanized as ‘Arablū) is a village in Sangestan Rural District of the Central District in Hamadan County, Hamadan province, Iran.

== Demographics ==
=== Population ===
At the time of the 2006 National Census, the village's population was 430 in 123 households. The following census in 2011 counted 441 people in 123 households. The 2016 census measured the population of the village as 361 people in 110 households.
