= Hasanabad-e Sheverin =

Neighborhood in Hamadan province, Iran

Hasanabad-e Sheverin Persian: حسن ابادشورين
- Neighborhood
- Location within Iran
- Coordinates: 34°50′33″N 48°32′53″E
- Country: Iran
- Province: Hamadan
- County: Hamadan
- District: Central
- City: Hamadan

Population (2016)
  - Total: 3,702
- Time zone: UTC+3:30 (IRST)

Hasanabad-e Sheverin (Persian: حسن ابادشورين) (Note: Also romanized as Ḩasanābād-e Shaverīn and Ḩasanābād-e Shevarīn; also known as Ḩasanābād) is a neighborhood in the city of Hamadan in the Central District of Hamadan County, Hamadan province, Iran.

== Demographics ==
=== Population ===
At the time of the 2006 National Census, Hasanabad-e Sheverin's population was 1,690 in 435 households, when it was a village in Hegmataneh Rural District. The following census in 2011 counted 4,428 people in 864 households. The 2016 census measured the population of the village as 3,702 people in 995 households.

Hasanabad-e Sheverin was annexed by the city of Hamadan in 2019.
