= Aq Tappeh, Gonbad =

Village in Hamadan province, Iran

Aq Tappeh Persian: اق تپه
- Village
- Location within Iran
- Coordinates: 34°41′04″N 48°50′19″E
- Country: Iran
- Province: Hamadan
- County: Hamadan
- District: Central
- Rural District: Gonbad

Population (2016)
  - Total: 35
- Time zone: UTC+3:30 (IRST)

Aq Tappeh (Persian: اق تپه) (Note: Also romanized as Āq Tappeh; also known as Āq Tappeh-ye Nashr and Āq Tepe) is a village in Gonbad Rural District of the Central District in Hamadan County, Hamadan province, Iran.

== Demographics ==
=== Population ===
At the time of the 2006 National Census, the village's population was 50 in 10 households. The following census in 2011 counted 35 people in 12 households. The 2016 census measured the population of the village as 35 people in 10 households.
