= Ansar ol Emam =

Village in Hamadan province, Iran

Ansar ol Emam Persian: انصارالامام
- Village
- Location within Iran
- Coordinates: 34°51′31″N 48°29′27″E
- Country: Iran
- Province: Hamadan
- County: Hamadan
- District: Central
- Rural District: Alvandkuh-e Gharbi

Population (2016)
  - Total: 2,549
- Time zone: UTC+3:30 (IRST)

Ansar ol Emam (Persian: انصارالامام) (Note: Also romanized as Anşār ol Emām; also known as Yangījeh (ینگیجه)) is a village in, and the capital of, Alvandkuh-e Gharbi Rural District in the Central District of Hamadan County, Hamadan province, Iran.

== Demographics ==
=== Population ===
At the time of the 2006 National Census, the village's population was 2,742 in 751 households. The following census in 2011 counted 2,799 people in 846 households. The 2016 census measured the population of the village as 2,549 people in 829 households.
