= Simin-e Abaru =

Village in Hamadan province, Iran

Simin-e Abaru Persian: سيمين ابرو
- Village
- Location within Iran
- Coordinates: 34°40′59″N 48°35′12″E
- Country: Iran
- Province: Hamadan
- County: Hamadan
- District: Central
- Rural District: Abaru

Population (2016)
  - Total: 349
- Time zone: UTC+3:30 (IRST)

Simin-e Abaru (Persian: سيمين ابرو) (Note: Also romanized as Sīmīn-e Abarū and Sīmīn-e Eberū; also known as Sīmīn and Sīmīn-e Anjalas) is a village in Abaru Rural District of the Central District in Hamadan County, Hamadan province, Iran.

== Demographics ==
=== Population ===
At the time of the 2006 National Census, the village's population was 323 in 72 households. The following census in 2011 counted 324 people in 82 households. The 2016 census measured the population of the village as 349 people in 101 households.
