= Rahimabad, Hamadan =

Village in Hamadan province, Iran

Rahimabad Persian: رحيم اباد
- Village
- Location within Iran
- Coordinates: 34°47′16″N 48°48′56″E
- Country: Iran
- Province: Hamadan
- County: Hamadan
- District: Central
- Rural District: Gonbad

Population (2016)
  - Total: 22
- Time zone: UTC+3:30 (IRST)

Rahimabad (Persian: رحيم اباد) (Note: Also romanized as Raḩīmābād) is a village in Gonbad Rural District of the Central District in Hamadan County, Hamadan province, Iran.

== Demographics ==
=== Population ===
At the time of the 2006 National Census, the village's population was 34 in seven households. The 2016 census measured the population of the village as 22 people in nine households.
