= Aliabad-e Aq Hesar =

Village in Hamadan province, Iran

Aliabad-e Aq Hesar Persian: علي اباداق حصار
- Village
- Location within Iran
- Coordinates: 34°53′45″N 48°36′27″E
- Country: Iran
- Province: Hamadan
- County: Hamadan
- District: Central
- Rural District: Hegmataneh

Population (2016)
  - Total: 267
- Time zone: UTC+3:30 (IRST)

Aliabad-e Aq Hesar (Persian: علي اباداق حصار) (Note: Also romanized as ‘Alīābād-e Āq Ḩeşār; also known as ‘Alīābād-e Jowraqān, ‘Alīābād-e Jowzaghān, and ‘Alīābād-e Jūrūghān) is a village in Hegmataneh Rural District of the Central District in Hamadan County, Hamadan province, Iran.

== Demographics ==
=== Population ===
At the time of the 2006 National Census, the village's population was 257 in 55 households. The following census in 2011 counted 251 people in 69 households. The 2016 census measured the population of the village as 267 people in 84 households.
