= Cheshmeh Qassaban =

Village in Hamadan province, Iran

Cheshmeh Qassaban Persian: چشمه قصابان
- Village
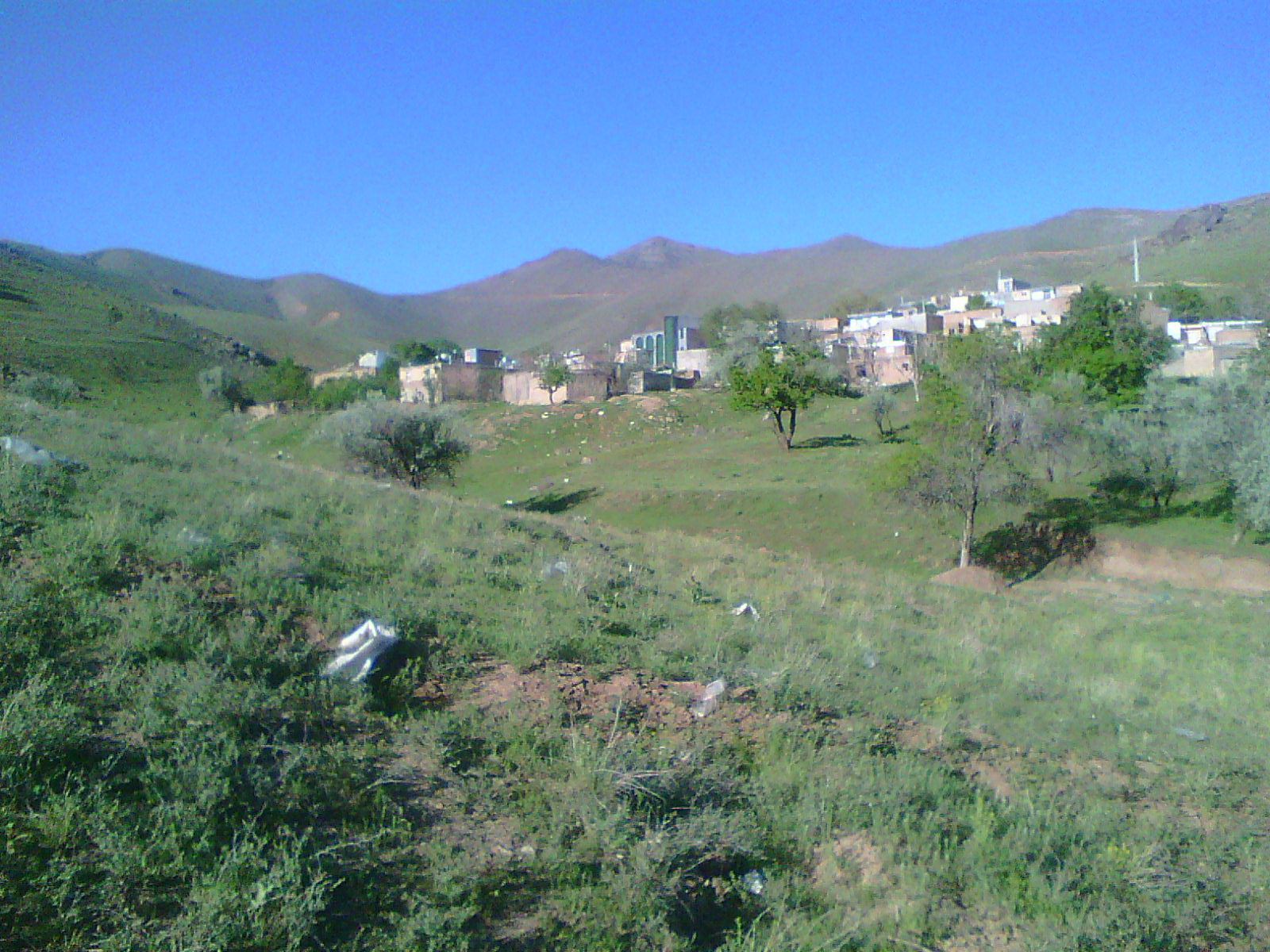
- The village of Cheshmeh Qassaban

- Location within Iran
- Coordinates: 34°51′36″N 48°25′10″E
- Country: Iran
- Province: Hamadan
- County: Hamadan
- District: Central
- Rural District: Alvandkuh-e Gharbi

Population (2016)
  - Total: 633
- Time zone: UTC+3:30 (IRST)

Cheshmeh Qassaban (Persian: چشمه قصابان) (Note: Also romanized as Chashmeh Qaşbān, Cheshmeh Qaşaban, and Cheshmeh Qaşşābān) is a village in Alvandkuh-e Gharbi Rural District of the Central District in Hamadan County, Hamadan province, Iran.

== Demographics ==
=== Population ===
At the time of the 2006 National Census, the village's population was 608 in 151 households. The following census in 2011 counted 635 people in 184 households. The 2016 census measured the population of the village as 633 people in 193 households.
