= Abaru, Hamadan =

Village in Hamadan province, Iran

Abaru Persian: ابرو
- Village
- Location within Iran
- Coordinates: 34°42′35″N 48°34′19″E
- Country: Iran
- Province: Hamadan
- County: Hamadan
- District: Central
- Rural District: Abaru

Population (2016)
  - Total: 3,585
- Time zone: UTC+3:30 (IRST)

Abaru (Persian: ابرو) (Note: Also romanized as Abarū, Abrū, Eberoo, and Eberū) is a village in, and the capital of, Abaru Rural District in the Central District of Hamadan County, Hamadan province, Iran.

== Demographics ==
=== Population ===
At the time of the 2006 National Census, the village's population was 3,486 in 773 households. The following census in 2011 counted 3,783 people in 1,034 households. The 2016 census measured the population of the village as 3,585 people in 1,013 households, the most populous in its rural district.
