= Kashin =

Kashin (masculine) or Kashina (feminine) may refer to:

== People ==
- Kashin (surname)

== Places ==
- Kashin (town), a town in Tver Oblast, Russia
  - Anna of Kashin (1280–1368), a princess of Kashin from the Rurik Dynasty
- Kashin, Iran, a village in Hamadan Province, Iran
- Kashina (village), a village in Blagoevgrad Province, Bulgaria

== Other uses ==
- Kashin, a feudal retainer in Japan
- Kashin-class destroyer, a Soviet Navy destroyer class
- Mod Kashin-class destroyer, an updated version of the Kashin class
- Kashin (elephant) (1968–2009), an elephant at Auckland Zoo
- Kachina, a spirit being in western Puebloan cosmology and religious practices
- Hopi Kachina dolls, created by artists of the Hopi pueblos
