= Abaru =

Abaru or Abru or Ab Row or Eberu or Eberoo (Persian: ابرو) may refer to:

- Abaru, Hamadan
- Abru, Isfahan
- Abaru Rural District, in Hamadan Province
