= Nahran, Hamadan =

Village in Hamadan province, Iran

Nahran Persian: نهران
- Village
- Location within Iran
- Coordinates: 34°56′17″N 48°36′50″E
- Country: Iran
- Province: Hamadan
- County: Hamadan
- District: Central
- Rural District: Hegmataneh

Population (2016)
  - Total: 151
- Time zone: UTC+3:30 (IRST)

Nahran (Persian: نهران) (Note: Also romanized as Nahrān; formerly known as Nahrān-e Kharābeh (نهران خرابه); also known as Nahran Kharāb and Nahrān-e Kharāb) is a village in Hegmataneh Rural District of the Central District in Hamadan County, Hamadan province, Iran.

== Demographics ==
=== Population ===
At the time of the 2006 National Census, the village's population was 164 in 38 households. The following census in 2011 counted 280 people in 47 households. The 2016 census measured the population of the village as 151 people in 47 households.
