= Sangestan, Hamadan =

Village in Hamadan province, Iran

Sangestan Persian: سنگستان
- Village
- Location within Iran
- Coordinates: 34°47′02″N 48°35′43″E
- Country: Iran
- Province: Hamadan
- County: Hamadan
- District: Central
- Rural District: Sangestan

Population (2016)
  - Total: 1,195
- Time zone: UTC+3:30 (IRST)

Sangestan (Persian: سنگستان) (Note: Also romanized as Sangestān and Sangistān) is a village in Sangestan Rural District of the Central District in Hamadan County, Hamadan province, Iran.

== Demographics ==
=== Population ===
At the time of the 2006 National Census, the village's population was 1,127 in 336 households. The following census in 2011 counted 1,193 people in 381 households. The 2016 census measured the population of the village as 1,195 people in 395 households.
