= Ivak, Hamadan =

Village in Hamadan province, Iran

Ivak Persian: ایوک
- Village
- Location within Iran
- Coordinates: 34°45′41″N 48°40′36″E
- Country: Iran
- Province: Hamadan
- County: Hamadan
- District: Central
- Rural District: Sangestan

Population (2016)
  - Total: 325
- Time zone: UTC+3:30 (IRST)

Ivak (Persian: ایوک) (Note: Also romanized as Īvak) is a village in Sangestan Rural District of the Central District in Hamadan County, Hamadan province, Iran.

== Demographics ==
=== Population ===
At the time of the 2006 National Census, the village's population was 361 in 93 households. The following census in 2011 counted 358 people in 96 households. The 2016 census measured the population of the village as 325 people in 98 households.
