= Arzan Fud =

Village in Hamadan province, Iran

Arzan Fud Persian: ارزان فود
- Village
- Location within Iran
- Coordinates: 34°39′14″N 48°39′11″E
- Country: Iran
- Province: Hamadan
- County: Hamadan
- District: Central
- Rural District: Alvandkuh-e Sharqi

Population (2016)
  - Total: 2,402
- Time zone: UTC+3:30 (IRST)

Arzan Fud (Persian: ارزان فود) (Note: Also romanized as Arzan Food, Arzān Fūd, and Arzānfūd; also known as Arzāneh Bal, Arzānfūt, and Arzānpūd) is a village in Alvandkuh-e Sharqi Rural District of the Central District in Hamadan County, Hamadan province, Iran.

== Demographics ==
=== Population ===
At the time of the 2006 National Census, the village's population was 2,406 in 645 households. The following census in 2011 counted 2,360 people in 718 households. The 2016 census measured the population of the village as 2,402 people in 750 households, the most populous in its rural district.
