= Owliai =

Village in Hamadan province, Iran

Owliai Persian: اوليايي
- Village
- Location within Iran
- Coordinates: 34°56′23″N 48°40′04″E
- Country: Iran
- Province: Hamadan
- County: Hamadan
- District: Central
- Rural District: Hegmataneh

Population (2016)
  - Total: 16
- Time zone: UTC+3:30 (IRST)

Owliai (Persian: اوليايي) (Note: Also romanized as Owlīā’ī; also known as Owleyā’ and Owlīā’) is a village in Hegmataneh Rural District of the Central District in Hamadan County, Hamadan province, Iran.

== Demographics ==
=== Population ===
At the time of the 2006 National Census, the village's population was 24 in six households. The 2016 census measured the population of the village as 16 people in seven households.
