= Nehran =

Nehran or Nahran or Nakhran (Persian: نهران) may refer to:

- Nahran, East Azerbaijan
- Nahran, Hamadan
- Nehran, Qazvin
