= Muyijin =

Village in Hamadan province, Iran

Muyijin Persian: موييجين
- Village
- Location within Iran
- Coordinates: 34°49′10″N 48°23′57″E
- Country: Iran
- Province: Hamadan
- County: Hamadan
- District: Central
- Rural District: Alvandkuh-e Gharbi

Population (2016)
  - Total: 1,840
- Time zone: UTC+3:30 (IRST)

Muyijin (Persian: موييجين) (Note: Also romanized as Moo’ijin and Mū’ījīn; also known as Hū’ī Jīn, Marījīn, Muijin, Mū’īn, and Mū’jīn) is a village in Alvandkuh-e Gharbi Rural District of the Central District in Hamadan County, Hamadan province, Iran.

== Demographics ==
=== Population ===
At the time of the 2006 National Census, the village's population was 1,759 in 434 households. The following census in 2011 counted 1,802 people in 503 households. The 2016 census measured the population of the village as 1,840 people in 579 households.
