= Cheshin =

Cheshin may refer to:

- Mishael Cheshin (1936–2015), Israeli judge
- Cheshin, Iran (disambiguation), places in Iran
