= Arzaneh =

Arzaneh (Persian: ارزنه) may refer to:

- Arzaneh, East Azerbaijan
- Arzaneh, Bakharz, Razavi Khorasan Province
- Arzaneh, Khvaf, Razavi Khorasan Province

== See also ==
- Arzaneh Bal
