= Tofy Mussivand =

Iranian-Canadian engineer (1942–2024)

- Born: Tofigh Mussivand; 2 December 1942; Varkaneh, Hamadan province, Iran
- Died: 7 January 2024 (aged 81)
- Occupation: Engineer
- Known for: Inventing an artificial cardiac pump

Tofigh "Tofy" Mussivand (Persian: توفیق موسیوند; 2 December 1942 – 7 January 2024) was an Iranian-Canadian medical engineer of Kurdish origin who invented the Artificial Cardiac Pump, a device that pumps blood and takes over the function of breathing during a heart surgery.

== Biography ==
Mussivand was born to Kurdish parents in the village of Varkaneh in Hamadan province, Iran. Before leaving Varkaneh to study in Tehran, he was a goat herder. He studied engineering at Tehran University and University of Alberta, and fled Iran in 1957. He worked for the Canadian government, crown corporations, and the private sector.

Mussivand went on to receive his doctorate in medical engineering and medical sciences at the University of Akron and the Northeastern Ohio Universities College of Medicine. Thereafter, he joined the Cleveland Clinic. In 1989, Mussivand returned to Canada.

Mussivand was a professor of surgery and of engineering at the University of Ottawa and Carleton University; the chair and director of the cardiovascular devices division of the University of Ottawa Heart Institute (UOHI) and medical devices program of both the University of Ottawa and Carleton University. He was an honorary member of the Iranian Academy of Medical Sciences.

Mussivand died on 7 January 2024, at the age of 81.

== Selected publications ==
- Mussivand, Tofy (2004). "856-1 Mechanical circulatory support: Evolving trends in support duration". Journal of the American College of Cardiology. 43 (5). Elsevier Biomedical: A233. doi:10.1016/s0735-1097(04)90994-1. ISSN 0735-1097. OCLC 98570923.
- Imachi, Kou; Mussivand, Tofy (2010). "Outline of the International Organization for Standardization Standard for Circulatory Support Devices (ISO 14708-5)". Artificial Organs. 34 (9). Blackwell Publishing: 695–698. doi:10.1111/j.1525-1594.2010.01097.x. ISSN 1525-1594. OCLC 666863666. PMID 20883386.
- Mussivand, Tofy (2003). "Honoring Living Legends". Artificial Organs. 27 (6). Blackwell Science: 581–582. doi:10.1046/j.1525-1594.2003.07217.x. ISSN 1525-1594. OCLC 437591192. PMID 12780514. S2CID 2295240.
- Mielniczuk, Lisa; Mussivand, Tofy; Davies, Ross; Mesana, Thierry G (2004). "Patient Selection for Left Ventricular Assist Devices". Artificial Organs. 28 (2). Blackwell Publishing: 152–157. doi:10.1111/j.1525-1594.2003.47333.x. ISSN 1525-1594. OCLC 437941681. PMID 14961953.
- Mussivand, Tofy (1998). "Lessons Learned from the Grandfather of Artificial Organs". Artificial Organs. 22 (11). New York, Raven Press: 985–987. doi:10.1046/j.1525-1594.1998.06255.x. ISSN 1525-1594. OCLC 92216345. PMID 9821535.
- Mussivand, Tofy (1999). "ORIGINAL ARTICLES – Mechanical Circulatory Devices for the Treatment of Heart Failure – The results of a prospective trial of partial left ventriculectomy (PLV) in patients with idiopathic dilated cardiomyopathy, left ventricular end-diastolic diameter (LVEDD) > 7 cm, refractory NYHA Class IV symptoms, and depressed exercise oxygen consumption studies are reported. PLV can be performed with acceptable early and 12-month mortality. Significant improvement in LVEF, LVEDD, and NYHA Class are seen at up to 12-month follow-up". Journal of Cardiac Surgery. 14 (3). Futura: 218–228. doi:10.1111/j.1540-8191.1999.tb00983.x. ISSN 0886-0440. OCLC 96424197. PMID 10789713. S2CID 72383213.
