= Cheshmeh Malek =

Village in Hamadan province, Iran

Cheshmeh Malek Persian: چشمه ملك
- Village
- Location within Iran
- Coordinates: 34°45′18″N 48°29′35″E
- Country: Iran
- Province: Hamadan
- County: Hamadan
- District: Central
- Rural District: Abaru

Population (2016)
  - Total: 266
- Time zone: UTC+3:30 (IRST)

Cheshmeh Malek (Persian: چشمه ملك) (Note: Also known as Darreh Dīvīn, Dewīn, Dīrchīn, Dīvīn, and Dīvjīn) is a village in Abaru Rural District of the Central District in Hamadan County, Hamadan province, Iran.

== Demographics ==
=== Language ===
The linguistic composition of the village:

Cheshmeh Malek linguistic composition
Language	percent
Central Kurdish	55%
Laki	35%
New Persian	10%

=== Population ===
At the time of the 2006 National Census, the village's population was 252 in 65 households. The following census in 2011 counted 268 people in 78 households. The 2016 census measured the population of the village as 266 people in 87 households.
