= Alvandkuh-e Sharqi Rural District =

Rural district in Hamadan province, Iran

Alvandkuh-e Sharqi Rural District Persian: دهستان الوندكوه شرقي
- Rural District
- Location within Iran
- Coordinates: 34°41′N 48°37′E
- Country: Iran
- Province: Hamadan
- County: Hamadan
- District: Central
- Established: 1987
- Capital: Tafrijan

Population (2016)
  - Total: 5,748
- Time zone: UTC+3:30 (IRST)

Alvandkuh-e Sharqi Rural District (Persian: دهستان الوندكوه شرقي) is in the Central District of Hamadan County, Hamadan province, Iran. Its capital is the village of Tafrijan.

== Demographics ==
=== Population ===
At the time of the 2006 National Census, the rural district's population was 6,448 in 1,719 households. There were 5,885 inhabitants in 1,812 households at the following census of 2011. The 2016 census measured the population of the rural district as 5,748 in 1,804 households. The most populous of its eight villages was Arzan Fud, with 2,402 people.

=== Other villages in the rural district ===
- Aliabad-e Varkaneh
- Sadd-e Ekbatan
- Shamsabad
- Tekmeh Dash
- Varkaneh
- Yalfan
