= Mu'in =

Mu'in may refer to:

- Mu'in, Iran, a village in Hamadan Province
- Mu'in ad-Din, a given name
- Mu'in ad-Din Unur (d. 1149), ruler of Damascus in the mid-12th century
- Mu'in al-Madi, Palestinian politician
- Muin Bseiso (1926-1984), Egyptian poet

== See also ==
- Muin (disambiguation)
