= Alvandkuh-e Gharbi Rural District =

Rural district in Hamadan province, Iran

Alvandkuh-e Gharbi Rural District Persian: دهستان الوندكوه غربي
- Rural District
- Location within Iran
- Coordinates: 34°50′N 48°26′E
- Country: Iran
- Province: Hamadan
- County: Hamadan
- District: Central
- Established: 1987
- Capital: Ansar ol Emam

Population (2016)
  - Total: 18,454
- Time zone: UTC+3:30 (IRST)

Alvandkuh-e Gharbi Rural District (Persian: دهستان الوندكوه غربي) is in the Central District of Hamadan County, Hamadan province, Iran. Its capital is the village of Ansar ol Emam.

== Demographics ==
=== Population ===
At the time of the 2006 National Census, the rural district's population was 17,276 in 4,523 households. There were 19,499 inhabitants in 5,451 households at the following census of 2011. The 2016 census measured the population of the rural district as 18,454 in 5,684 households. The most populous of its 12 villages was Solulan, with 3,236 people.

=== Other villages in the rural district ===
- Cheshmeh Qassaban
- Heydareh-ye Balai-ye Shahr
- Mehdiabad
- Muyijin
- Tuyijin
- Vafr-e Jin
- Yekanabad
