= Ivak =

Ivak or Ivek (Persian: ایوک) may refer to:

- Ivak, Hamadan
- Ivek, Mazandaran
