= Dewin =

Dewin may refer to:

- Pierre Dewin, Belgian water polo player
- Dewin, Iran, a village in Hamadan Province, Iran
