= Hegmataneh Rural District =

Rural district in Hamadan province, Iran

Hegmataneh Rural District Persian: دهستان هگمتانه
- Rural District
- Location within Iran
- Coordinates: 34°51′N 48°33′E
- Country: Iran
- Province: Hamadan
- County: Hamadan
- District: Central
- Established: 1987
- Capital: Juraqan

Population (2016)
  - Total: 35,653
- Time zone: UTC+3:30 (IRST)

Hegmataneh Rural District (Persian: دهستان هگمتانه) is in the Central District of Hamadan County, Hamadan province, Iran. It is administered from the city of Juraqan.

== Demographics ==
=== Population ===
At the time of the 2006 National Census, the rural district's population was 22,813 in 5,624 households. There were 34,889 inhabitants in 8,568 households at the following census of 2011. The 2016 census measured the population of the rural district as 35,653 in 9,458 households. The most populous of its 14 villages was Qasemabad (now a neighborhood in the city of Hamadan), with 8,125 people.

=== Other villages in the rural district ===
- Aliabad-e Aq Hesar
- Amzajerd
- Bahramabad
- Deh Piaz
- Gara Choqa
- Nahran
- Owliai
- Qeshlaq-e Gomar
- Robat-e Sheverin

=== Former villages now neighborhoods in the city of Hamadan ===
- Aliabad-e Posht Shahr
- Hasanabad-e Sheverin
- Qasemabad
