= Gonbad Rural District =

Rural district in Hamadan province, Iran

Gonbad Rural District Persian: دهستان گنبد
- Rural District
- Location within Iran
- Coordinates: 34°44′N 48°47′E
- Country: Iran
- Province: Hamadan
- County: Hamadan
- District: Central
- Established: 1987
- Capital: Gonbad

Population (2016)
  - Total: 2,991
- Time zone: UTC+3:30 (IRST)

Gonbad Rural District (Persian: دهستان گنبد) is in the Central District of Hamadan County, Hamadan province, Iran. Its capital is the village of Gonbad.

== Demographics ==
=== Population ===
At the time of the 2006 National Census, the rural district's population was 3,916 in 893 households. There were 3,233 inhabitants in 922 households at the following census of 2011. The 2016 census measured the population of the rural district as 2,991 in 927 households. The most populous of its 17 villages was Gonbad, with 1,654 people.

=== Other villages in the rural district ===
- Ab Hendu
- Aq Tappeh
- Baraband
- Gol-e Kahriz
- Heyran
- Neshar
- Qoli Kandi
- Rahimabad
