= Divin =

Divin may refer to:

- Moldovan brandy
- Divin, Bileća, a village in Republika Srpska, Bosnia and Herzegovina
- Divín, a village and municipality in the Banská Bystrica Region of Slovakia
- Divin, Iran, a village also known as Cheshmeh Malek
- Divin Baningime (born 2000), Congolese footballer
- Divin Mubama (born 2004), English footballer
- Karol Divín (1936–2022), Czechoslovak figure skater
- Mark Divin (born 1980), Australian cricketer
