= Owlia =

Owlia (Persian: اوليا) may refer to:

- Owlia, Hamadan
- Owlia, Tehran
