= Keshin =

Keshin may refer to:

- Keshin, Japanese term for reincarnation; specifically the physical body of the Buddha that appears in this world
- Keshin (novel), a 1984 novel by Junichi Watanabe 1985
- Keshin (film), a 1986 Japanese film with Hitomi Kuroki, based on the novel
- "Keshin" (song), a 2009 song by Masaharu Fukuyama
- Keshin, Iran, alternative spelling of Cheshīn, Iran
- Sultan of Keshin, old spelling of the lord of Socotra who resided at Qishn on the Yemen mainland
- Keshin, old spelling of Qishan (official)
- Keshin, the long-haired ascete of Rigveda, Rudra, identified with Shiva
