= Maryanaj =

City in Hamadan province, Iran

Maryanaj Persian: مريانج
- City
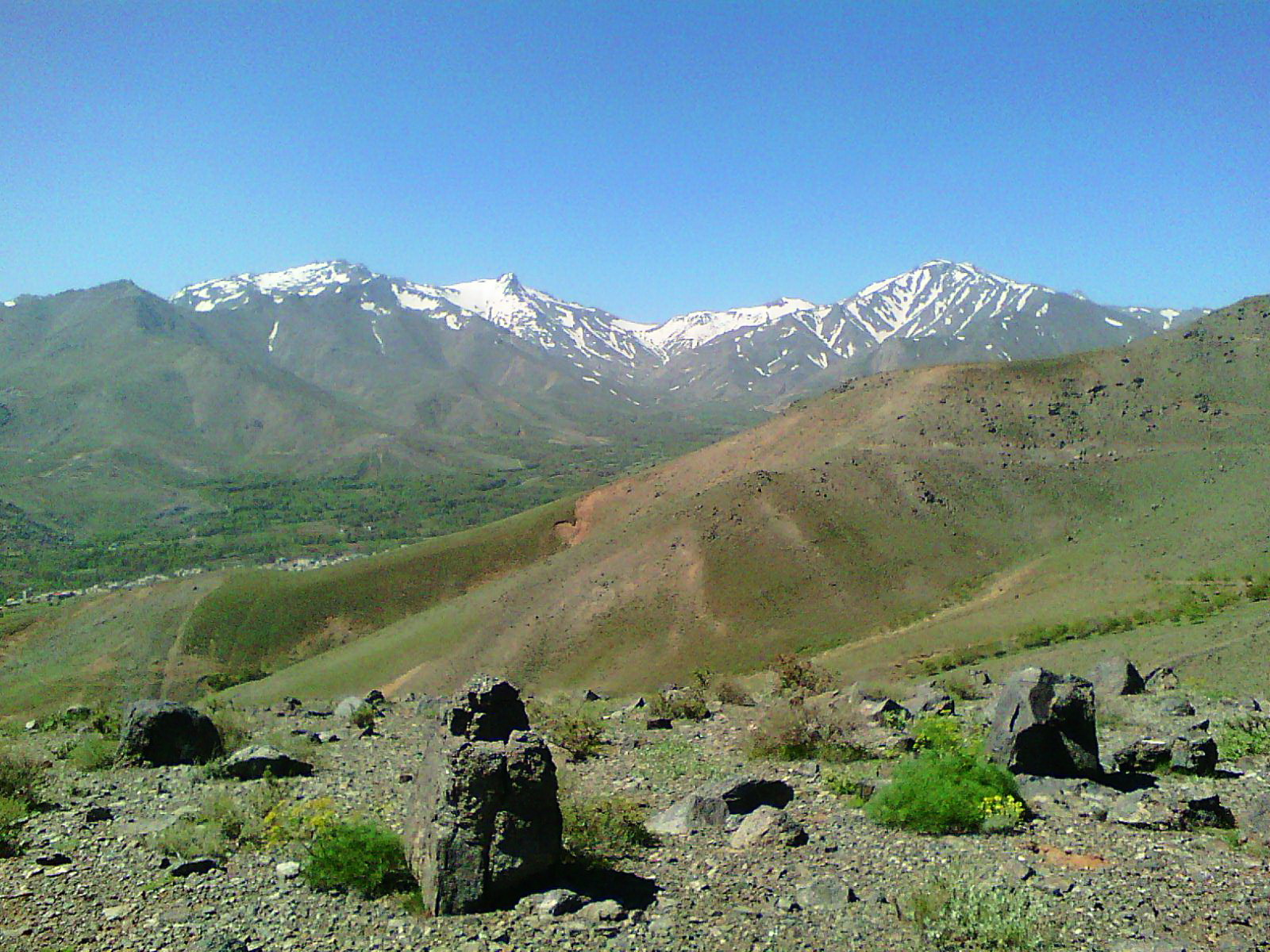
- Alvand Mountain overlooking Maryanaj

- Location within Iran
- Coordinates: 34°49′51″N 48°27′37″E
- Country: Iran
- Province: Hamadan
- County: Hamadan
- District: Central

Population (2016)
  - Total: 10,848
- Time zone: UTC+3:30 (IRST)

Maryanaj (Persian: مريانج) (Note: Also romanized as Maryānaj; also known as Marjān and Marjāna) is a city in the Central District of Hamadan County, Hamadan province, Iran.

== Etymology ==
The name Maryānaj is derived from Middle Persian *margānag, from Old Persian *margā- plus the suffix -ānag; it is related to the Middle Persian mlw' (vocalized /marw/) and Parthian mrg (vocalized /marγ/), both meaning "prairie", and to the Avestan marəγa and Modern Persian مرغ (marğ), both meaning "plant".

In the dialect of Hamadan, the name is pronounced Maryāneh (مریانه), a form influenced by Middle Persian; in the local dialect of Maryanaj itself, the name is pronounced Margāneh (مرگانه), an older form influenced by Northwestern Middle Iranian languages.

== Demographics ==
=== Population ===
At the time of the 2006 National Census, the city's population was 9,442 in 2,518 households. The following census in 2011 counted 10,207 people in 3,146 households. The 2016 census measured the population of the city as 10,848 people in 3,619 households.
