= Chashin =

Chashin or Cheshin (Persian: چشين) may refer to:

- Chashin, Hamadan
- Chashin, Zanjan
