= Juraqan =

City in Hamadan province, Iran

Juraqan Persian: جورقان
- City
- Location within Iran
- Coordinates: 34°53′06″N 48°33′19″E
- Country: Iran
- Province: Hamadan
- County: Hamadan
- District: Central
- Established as a city: 1996

Population (2016)
  - Total: 9,234
- Time zone: UTC+3:30 (IRST)

Juraqan (Persian: جورقان) (Note: Also romanized as Jowraqān and Jūraqān; also known as Jarūqān, Jooraghan, Jūrūghan, and Jūzghān) is a city in the Central District of Hamadan County, Hamadan province, Iran, serving as the administrative center for Hegmataneh Rural District. The village of Juraqan was converted to a city in 1996.

== Demographics ==
=== Population ===
At the time of the 2006 National Census, the city's population was 8,851 in 2,311 households. The following census in 2011 counted 9,262 people in 2,769 households. The 2016 census measured the population of the city as 9,234 people in 3,042 households.
