= Chashin, Hamadan =

Village in Hamadan province, Iran

Chashin Persian: چشين
- Village
- Location within Iran
- Coordinates: 34°44′55″N 48°33′12″E
- Country: Iran
- Province: Hamadan
- County: Hamadan
- District: Central
- Rural District: Abaru

Population (2016)
  - Total: 1,804
- Time zone: UTC+3:30 (IRST)

Chashin (Persian: چشين) (Note: Also romanized as Chashīn and Cheshīn; also known as Kāshī, Kāshin, and Keshīn) is a village in Abaru Rural District of the Central District in Hamadan County, Hamadan province, Iran.

== Demographics ==
=== Population ===
At the time of the 2006 National Census, the village's population was 1,447 in 360 households. The following census in 2011 counted 1,662 people in 502 households. The 2016 census measured the population of the village as 1,804 people in 589 households.
