= Muin =

Muin may refer to:

== People ==
- Abdulmaid Kiram Muin, Filipino diplomat
- Muin Bek Hafeez (born 1996), Indian basketball player
- Muin Bseiso
- Muin J. Khoury, American geneticist and epidemiologist
- Abu Saleh Muin

== Other ==
- Muin (letter) (ᚋ), eleventh letter of the Ogham alphabet
- Muin or Mu (lost continent)

== See also ==
- Mu'in (disambiguation)
