= Abaru Rural District =

Rural district in Hamadan province, Iran

Abaru Rural District Persian: دهستان ابرو
- Rural District
- Location within Iran
- Coordinates: 34°41′N 48°31′E
- Country: Iran
- Province: Hamadan
- County: Hamadan
- District: Central
- Established: 1990
- Capital: Abaru

Population (2016)
  - Total: 6,701
- Time zone: UTC+3:30 (IRST)

Abaru Rural District (Persian: دهستان ابرو) is in the Central District of Hamadan County, Hamadan province, Iran. Its capital is the village of Abaru.

== Demographics ==
=== Population ===
At the time of the 2006 National Census, the rural district's population was 6,329 in 1,486 households. There were 6,819 inhabitants in 1,931 households at the following census of 2011. The 2016 census measured the population of the rural district as 6,701 in 2,019 households. The most populous of its seven villages was Abaru, with 3,585 people.

=== Other villages in the rural district ===
- Chashin
- Cheshmeh Malek
- Khaku
- Silvar
- Simin-e Abaru
