= Baba Tahir =

11th-century dervish poet

Baba Tahir of Hamedan
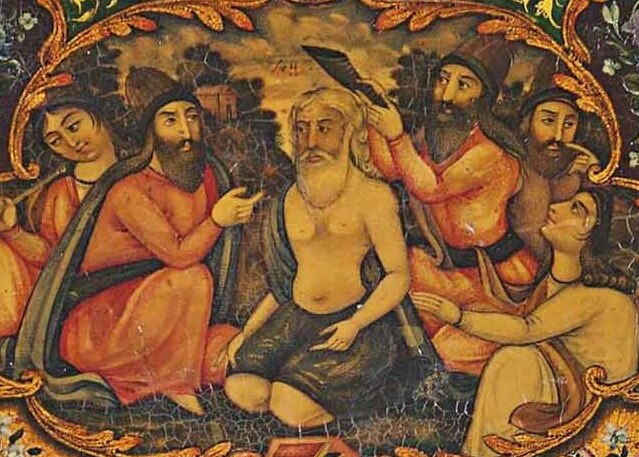
- Cover from a lacquer mirror case with multiple scenes, school of Mohammad Esmail Esfahani; the top scene depicts Baba Tahir with disciples. Created in Qajar Iran, dated c. 1855-60

Mystic Poet
- Born: c. 11th century Hamadan, Iran
- Died: c. 11th century Hamadan, Iran
- Venerated in: Islam
- Major shrine: Hamadan, Iran
- Influences: Ferdowsi, Sanai, Khwaja Abdullah Ansari, Mansur Al-Hallaj, Abu-Sa'id Abul-Khayr, Bayazid Bastami
- Influenced: Rumi, Hafez, Jami, Omar Khayyam, Nizami Ganjavi, and many other later mystic poets
- Tradition or genre: Mystic poetry

Baba Tahir or Baba Taher Oryan Hamadani (Persian: باباطاهر عریان همدانی) was an 11th-century dervish poet from Hamadan, Iran who lived during the reign of Tugril of the Seljuk dynasty over Iran. This is almost all that is known of him as he lived a mysterious lifestyle. Although the prefix "Baba" (roughly meaning 'The Wise' or 'The Respected') has been thought as part of his name in all known sources, his nickname "Oryan" (meaning 'The Naked') did not appear until about the 17th century. It is likely that the nickname was attributed to him because he seemed to lead a very spiritual and stoic lifestyle and thus was figuratively not clothed with worldly and material needs and suggests he may have been a wandering dervish. His poetry is written in the Hamadani dialect of the Persian language. L. P. Elwell-Sutton theorises that Baba Tahir wrote in the Hamadani dialect, adding: "Most traditional sources call it loosely Luri, while the name commonly applied from an early date to verses of this kind, Fahlaviyat, presumably implies that they were thought to be in a language related to the Middle Persian language. Armenian Iranologist and linguist Rouben Abrahamian however found a close affinity with the dialect spoken at the present time by the Jews of Hamadan." According to The Cambridge History of Iran, Baba Tahir spoke a certain Persian dialect.

== Biography ==
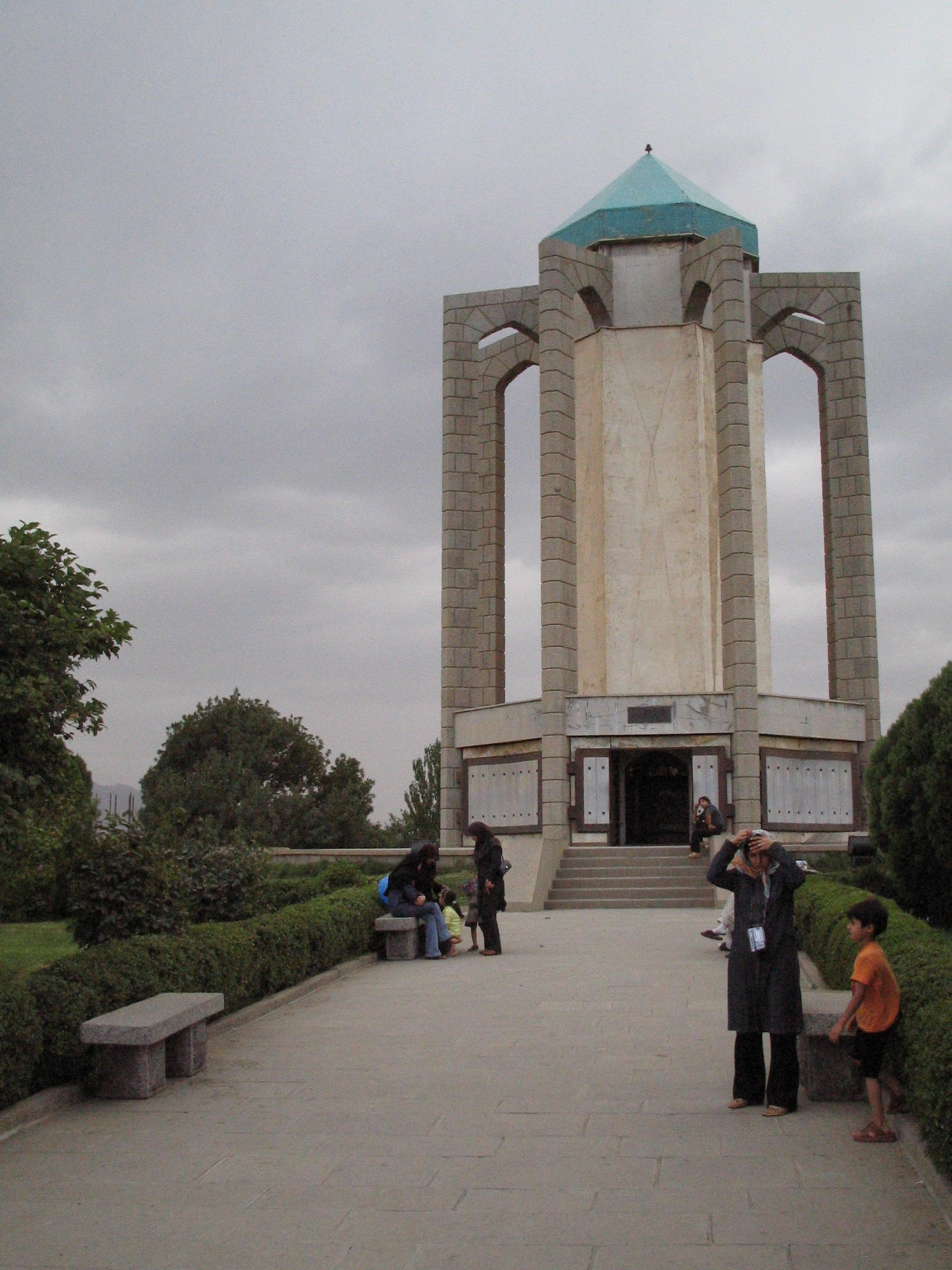
Baba Tahir Mausoleum in Hamadan

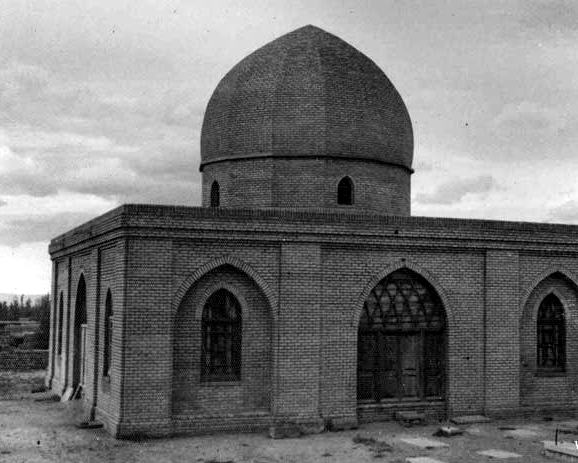
Old mausoleum of Baba Tahir in Hamadan

Baba Tahir is known as one of the most revered early poets in Persian literature. Little is known of his life. He was born in a Persian family and lived in Hamadan Province in Iran. Legend tells that the poet, an illiterate woodcutter, attended lectures at a religious school, where he was not welcomed by his fellow-students. The dates of his birth and death are unknown. One source indicates that he died in 1019. If this is accurate, it would make Baba Tahir a contemporary of Ferdowsi and Avicenna and an immediate precursor of Omar Khayyam. Another source reports that he lived between 1000 and 1055, which is unlikely. It is said that Baba Tahir lived for seventy-five years. Rahat al-sodur of Ravandi, whose work was completed 603/1206, describes a meeting between Baba Tahir and the Seljuq conqueror Tughril (pp. 98–99). At the time when Baba Tahir lived in the 10th century, there were great changes occurring in the development and growth of literature and art. Medieval artists and poets in Persia were greatly respected and valued and had the right to express their thoughts freely. According to L. P. Elwell-Sutton: "He could be described as the first great poet of Sufi love in Persian literature. In the last two decades his do-baytis have often been put to music".

== Poetry ==
Baba Tahir's poems are recited to the present day all over Iran accompanied by the setar, the three stringed lute. This ancient style of poetry is known as Pahlaviat. The quatrains of Baba Tahir have a more amorous and mystical connotation rather than a philosophical one. Many of Baba Tahir's poems are of the do-baytī style, a form of Persian quatrains, which some scholars regard as having affinities with Middle Persian verses.

== Writing ==
Kalemat-e Qesaar, a collection of nearly 400 aphorisms in Arabic, is attributed to Baba Tahir. Kalemat-e Qesaar has been the subject of commentaries, one allegedly by Ayn-al-Qozat Hamadani. An example of such a saying is one where Baba Tahir ties knowledge with gnosis: "Knowledge is the guide to gnosis, and when gnosis has come the vision of knowledge lapses and there remain only the movements of knowledge to gnosis"; "knowledge is the crown of the gnostic, and gnosis is the crown of knowledge"; "whoever witnesses what is decreed by God remains motionless and powerless."

== Mausoleum ==
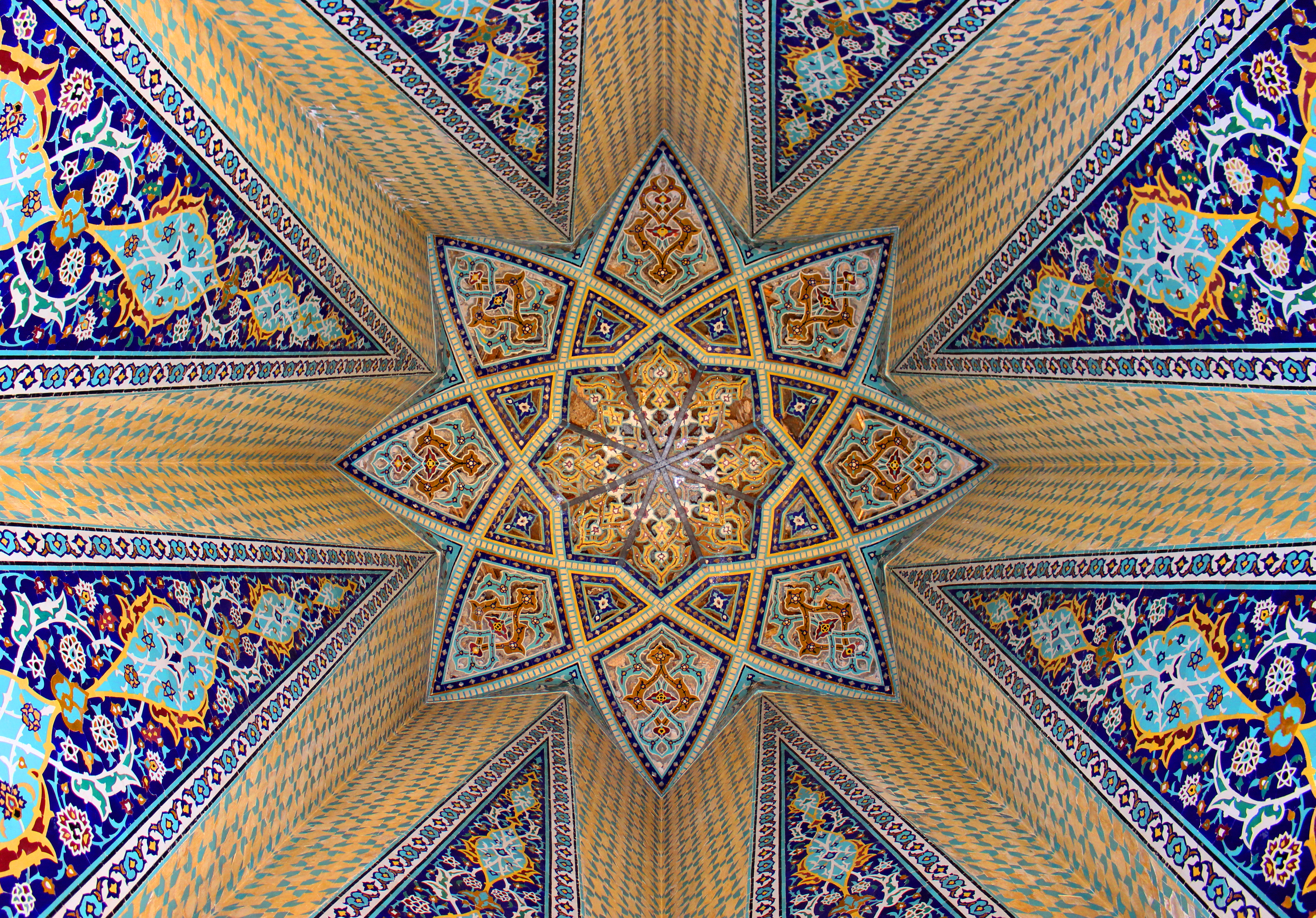
Interior view of the mausoleum's dome

His mausoleum, was designed by Mohsen Foroughi during the Pahlavi era. It is located near Hamadan's northern entrance, in a park and surrounded by flowers and winding paths. The structure consists of twelve external pillars surrounding a central tower.

== See also ==
- Mir Sayyid Ali Hamadani
- Ahmad NikTalab
- Persian literature
