= Kashin (surname) =

Kashin (masculine, Russian: Кашин) or Kashina (feminine, Russian: Кашинa) is a Russian surname. Notable people with the surname include:

- Anna Kashina, Russian writer
- Daniil Kashin (1769–1841), Russian composer
- Kendo Kashin (born 1968), ring name of the Japanese wrestler Tokimitsu Ishizawa
- Nikolay Kashin, Russian physician and discoverer of the Kashin–Beck disease
- Oleg Kashin (born 1980), Russian journalist and seaman
