= Baba Tahir Mausoleum =

Iranian national heritage site in Hamadan

Coordinates: 34.809064°N 48.508684°E

- آرامگاه باباطاهر
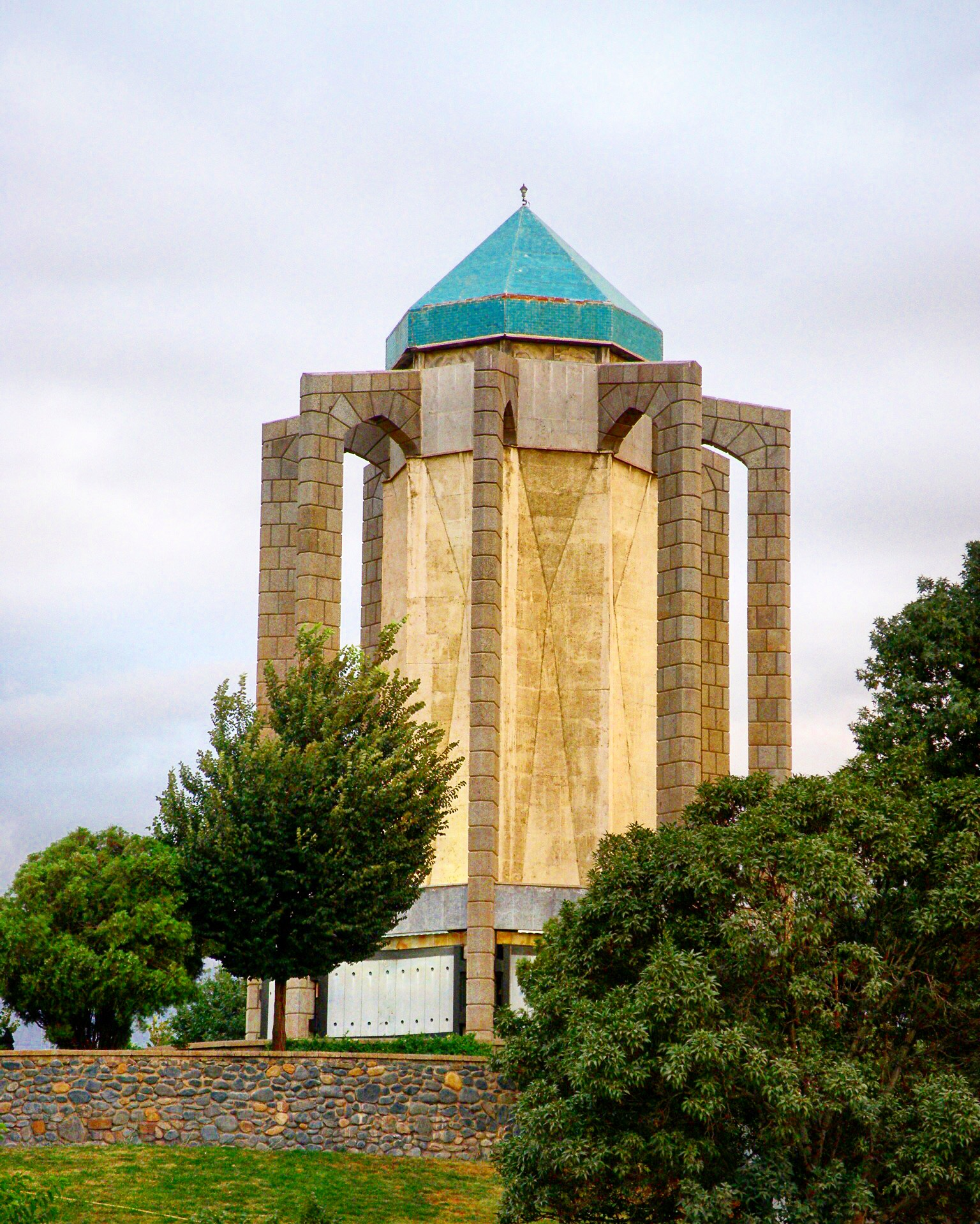
- Interactive map of the Baba Tahir Mausoleum area

General information
- Architectural style: Iranian architecture
- Location: Hamadan, Iran

The Baba Tahir Mausoleum َ(Persian: آرامگاه باباطاهر) in its current form was designed by the architect Mohsen Foroughi during the Pahlavi era and is located in Baba Tahir Square in Hamadan.

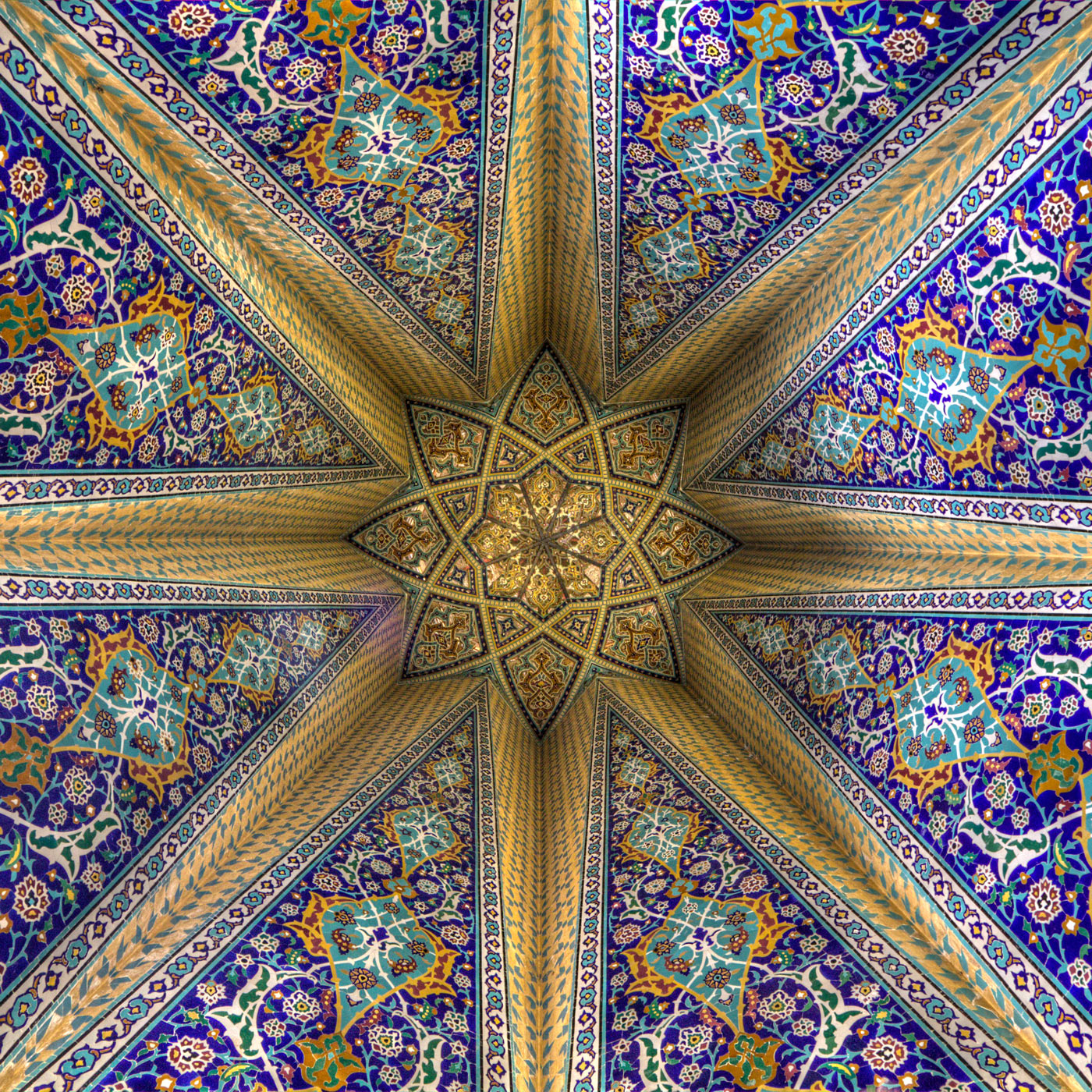
Interior view of the dome

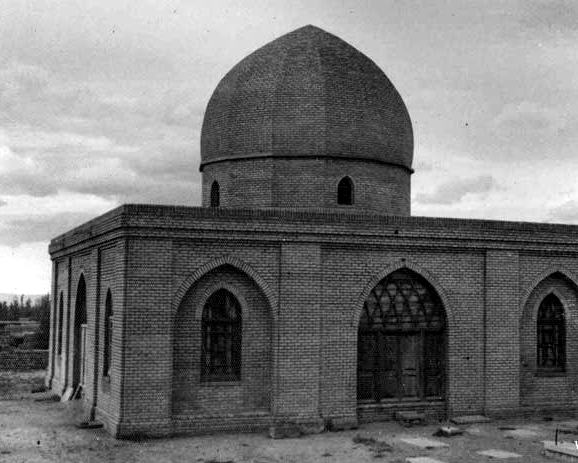
The old tomb
