= Yeganeh (name) =

Yeganeh (Persian: یگانه, romanized: Yegâne) or Yegana (Azerbaijani: Yeganə) is a Persian and Azerbaijani feminine given name. Its source word comes from the Persian یگانه meaning unique, single, incomparable. It is also used as a surname. Notable people with the name include:

== Given name ==
- Yegana Akhundova (born 1960), Azerbaijani pianist, composer, and teacher

Yeganeh Mafaher born 1998 Internet personality

== Surname ==
- Artimes Farshad Yeganeh (born 1981), Iranian rock climber
- Hamid Naderi Yeganeh (born 1990), Iranian digital artist
- Mohammad Yeganeh (1923–1995), Iranian economist
- Mohsen Yeganeh (born 1985), Iranian musician
- Nasser Yeganeh (1921–1993), Iranian jurist and politician
