= Nehran, Qazvin =

Nehran نهران
- Village
- Location within Iran
- Coordinates: 36°41′43″N 49°07′08″E
- Country: Iran
- Province: Qazvin
- County: Qazvin
- Bakhsh: Tarom Sofla
- Rural District: Khandan

Population (2006)
  - Total: 100
- Time zone: UTC+3:30 (IRST)
  - Summer (DST): UTC+4:30 (IRDT)

Nehran (Persian: نهران, also Romanized as Nehrān, Nahrān, and Nakhran) is a village in Khandan Rural District, Tarom Sofla District, Qazvin County, Qazvin Province, Iran. At the 2006 census, its population was 100, in 31 families.
