= Sangestan, Kerman =

Sangestan سنگ ستان
- Village
- Location within Iran
- Coordinates: 28°34′49″N 58°08′25″E
- Country: Iran
- Province: Kerman
- County: Anbarabad
- Bakhsh: Central
- Rural District: Amjaz

Population (2006)
  - Total: 31
- Time zone: UTC+3:30 (IRST)
  - Summer (DST): UTC+4:30 (IRDT)

Sangestan (Persian: سنگ ستان, also Romanized as Sangestān) is a village in Amjaz Rural District, in the Central District of Anbarabad County, Kerman Province, Iran. At the 2006 census, its population was 31, in 5 families.
