= Yeganeh Mahalleh =

Yeganeh Mahalleh يگانه محله
- Village
- Location within Iran
- Coordinates: 37°42′21″N 48°58′18″E
- Country: Iran
- Province: Gilan
- County: Talesh
- Bakhsh: Asalem
- Rural District: Asalem

Population (2006)
  - Total: 519
- Time zone: UTC+3:30 (IRST)
  - Summer (DST): UTC+4:30 (IRDT)

Yeganeh Mahalleh (Persian: يگانه محله, also Romanized as Yegāneh Maḩalleh) is a village in Asalem Rural District, Asalem District, Talesh County, Gilan Province, Iran. At the 2006 census, its population was 519, in 133 families. The local time zone is "Asia / Tehran" with an UTC offset of 4.5 hours.
