= Sangestan Rural District =

Rural district in Hamadan province, Iran

Sangestan Rural District Persian: دهستان سنگستان
- Rural District
- Location within Iran
- Coordinates: 34°51′N 48°42′E
- Country: Iran
- Province: Hamadan
- County: Hamadan
- District: Central
- Established: 1987
- Capital: Abshineh

Population (2016)
  - Total: 11,824
- Time zone: UTC+3:30 (IRST)

Sangestan Rural District (Persian: دهستان سنگستان) is in the Central District of Hamadan County, Hamadan province, Iran. Its capital is the village of Abshineh.

== Demographics ==
=== Population ===
At the time of the 2006 National Census, the rural district's population was 11,909 in 3,146 households. There were 13,038 inhabitants in 3,527 households at the following census of 2011. The 2016 census measured the population of the rural district as 11,824 in 3,584 households. The most populous of its 25 villages was Sheverin, with 4,473 people.

=== Other villages in the rural district ===
- Arablu
- Dingeleh Kahriz
- Ivak
- Konjineh
- Mahbar
- Sangestan
- Sorkhabad
