= Sangestan, Markazi =

Sangestan سنگستان
- Village
- Location within Iran
- Coordinates: 35°11′43″N 49°34′25″E
- Country: Iran
- Province: Markazi
- County: Saveh
- Bakhsh: Nowbaran
- Rural District: Kuhpayeh

Population (2006)
  - Total: 36
- Time zone: UTC+3:30 (IRST)
  - Summer (DST): UTC+4:30 (IRDT)

Sangestan (Persian: سنگستان, also Romanized as Sangestān) is a village in Kuhpayeh Rural District, Nowbaran District, Saveh County, Markazi Province, Iran. At the 2006 census, its population was 36, in 16 families.
