= Central District (Hamadan County) =

District in Hamadan province, Iran

Central District (Hamadan County) Persian: بخش مرکزی شهرستان همدان
- District
- Location within Iran
- Coordinates: 34°47′N 48°38′E
- Country: Iran
- Province: Hamadan
- County: Hamadan
- Capital: Hamadan

Population (2016)
  - Total: 655,859
- Time zone: UTC+3:30 (IRST)

The Central District of Hamadan County (Persian: بخش مرکزی شهرستان همدان) is in Hamadan province, Iran. Its capital is the city of Hamadan.

== Demographics ==
=== Population ===
At the time of the 2006 National Census, the district's population was 560,133 in 150,032 households. The following census in 2011 counted 628,626 people in 184,682 households. The 2016 census measured the population of the district as 655,859 inhabitants in 204,868 households.

=== Administrative divisions ===
Central District (Hamadan County) Population
Administrative Divisions	2006	2011	2016
Abaru RD	6,329	6,819	6,701
Alvandkuh-e Gharbi RD	17,276	19,499	18,454
Alvandkuh-e Sharqi RD	6,448	5,885	5,748
Gonbad RD	3,916	3,233	2,991
Hegmataneh RD	22,813	34,889	35,653
Sangestan RD	11,909	13,038	11,824
Hamadan (city)	473,149	525,794	554,406
Juraqan (city)	8,851	9,262	9,234
Maryanaj (city)	9,442	10,207	10,848
Total	560,133	628,626	655,859
RD = Rural District
