= Hamadan County =

County in Hamadan province, Iran

Hamadan County Persian: شهرستان همدان
- County
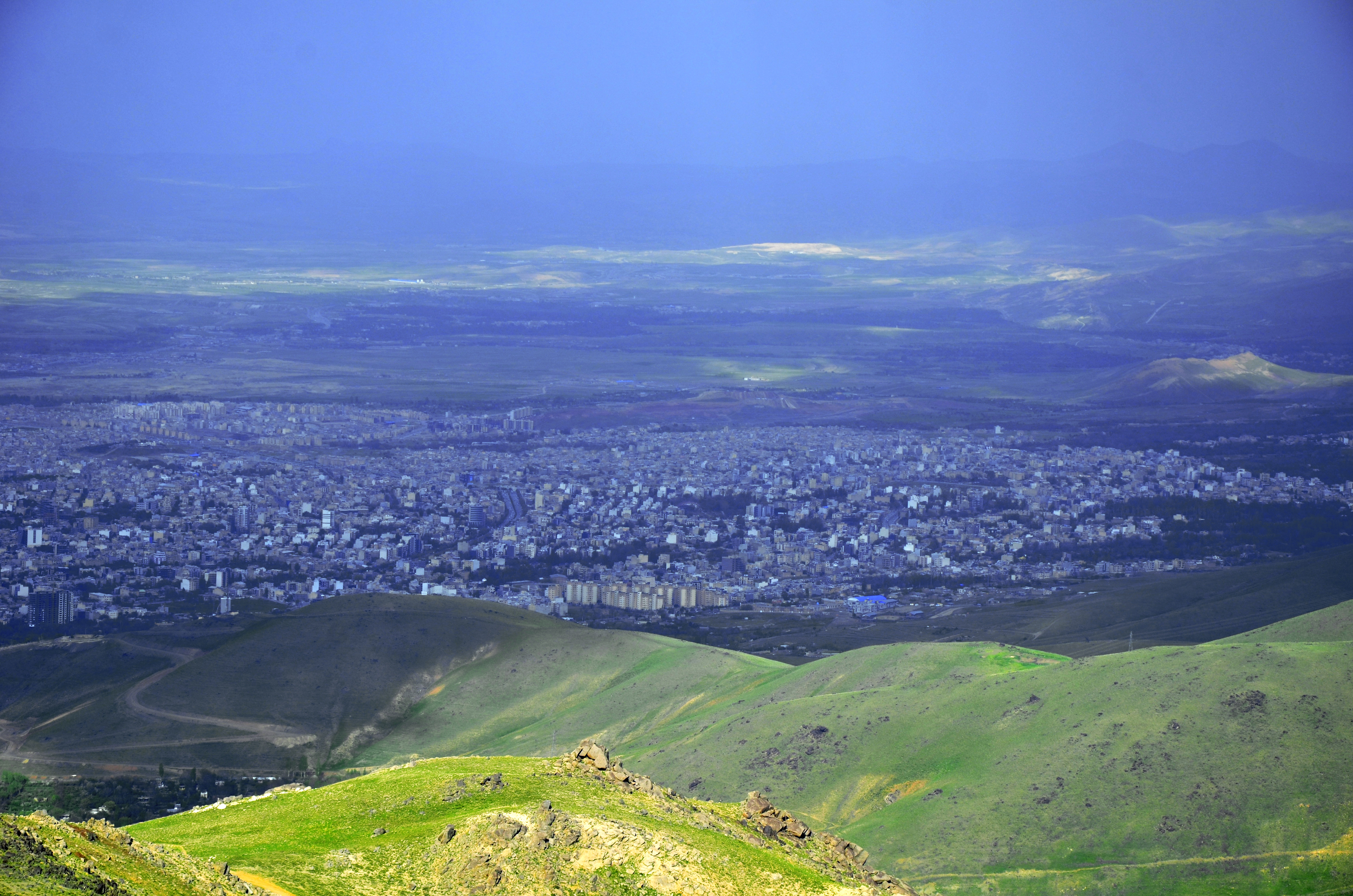
- The city of Hamadan from Mount Alvand

- Location of Hamadan County in Hamadan province (center, green)

- Location of Hamadan province in Iran
- Coordinates: 34°50′N 48°46′E
- Country: Iran
- Province: Hamadan
- Capital: Hamadan
- Districts: Central, Shara

Population (2016)
  - Total: 676,105
- Time zone: UTC+3:30 (IRST)

Hamadan County (Persian: شهرستان همدان) is in Hamadan province, Iran. Its capital is the city of Hamadan.

== History ==
IN 2009, Famenin District was separated from the county in the establishment of Famenin County.

== Demographics ==
=== Population ===
At the time of the 2006 National Census, the county's population was 626,183 in 165,753 households. The following census in 2011 counted 651,821 people in 190,808 households. The 2016 census measured the population of the county as 676,105 in 210,775 households.

=== Administrative divisions ===
Hamadan County's population history and administrative structure over three consecutive censuses are shown in the following table.

Hamadan County Population
Administrative Divisions	2006	2011	2016
Central District	560,133	628,626	655,859
Abaru RD	6,329	6,819	6,701
Alvandkuh-e Gharbi RD	17,276	19,499	18,454
Alvandkuh-e Sharqi RD	6,448	5,885	5,748
Gonbad RD	3,916	3,233	2,991
Hegmataneh RD	22,813	34,889	35,653
Sangestan RD	11,909	13,038	11,824
Hamadan (city)	473,149	525,794	554,406
Juraqan (city)	8,851	9,262	9,234
Maryanaj (city)	9,442	10,207	10,848
Famenin District (Note: Transferred to Famenin County)	40,541		
Khorram Dasht RD	14,050		
Mofatteh RD	8,145		
Pish Khowr RD	4,327		
Famenin (city)	14,019		
Shara District	25,509	23,195	20,242
Chah Dasht RD	6,708	5,411	4,407
Jeyhun Dasht RD	8,719	7,651	6,918
Shur Dasht RD	7,675	7,018	5,947
Qahavand (city)	2,407	3,115	2,970
Total	626,183	651,821	676,105
RD = Rural District

== See also ==
Media related to Hamadan County at Wikimedia Commons
