= Hamadan province =

Province of Iran

Hamadan Province استان همدان (Persian)
- Province
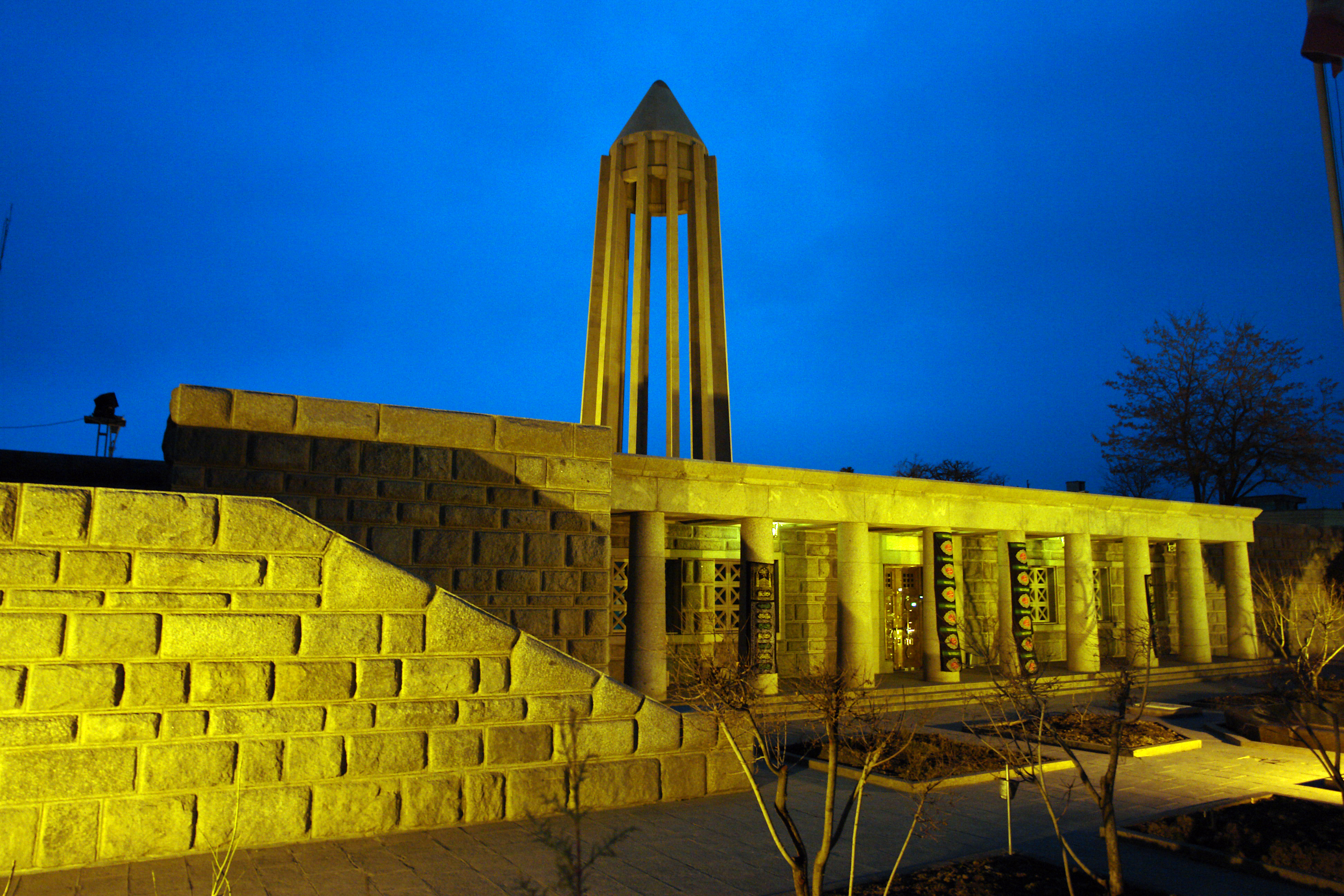
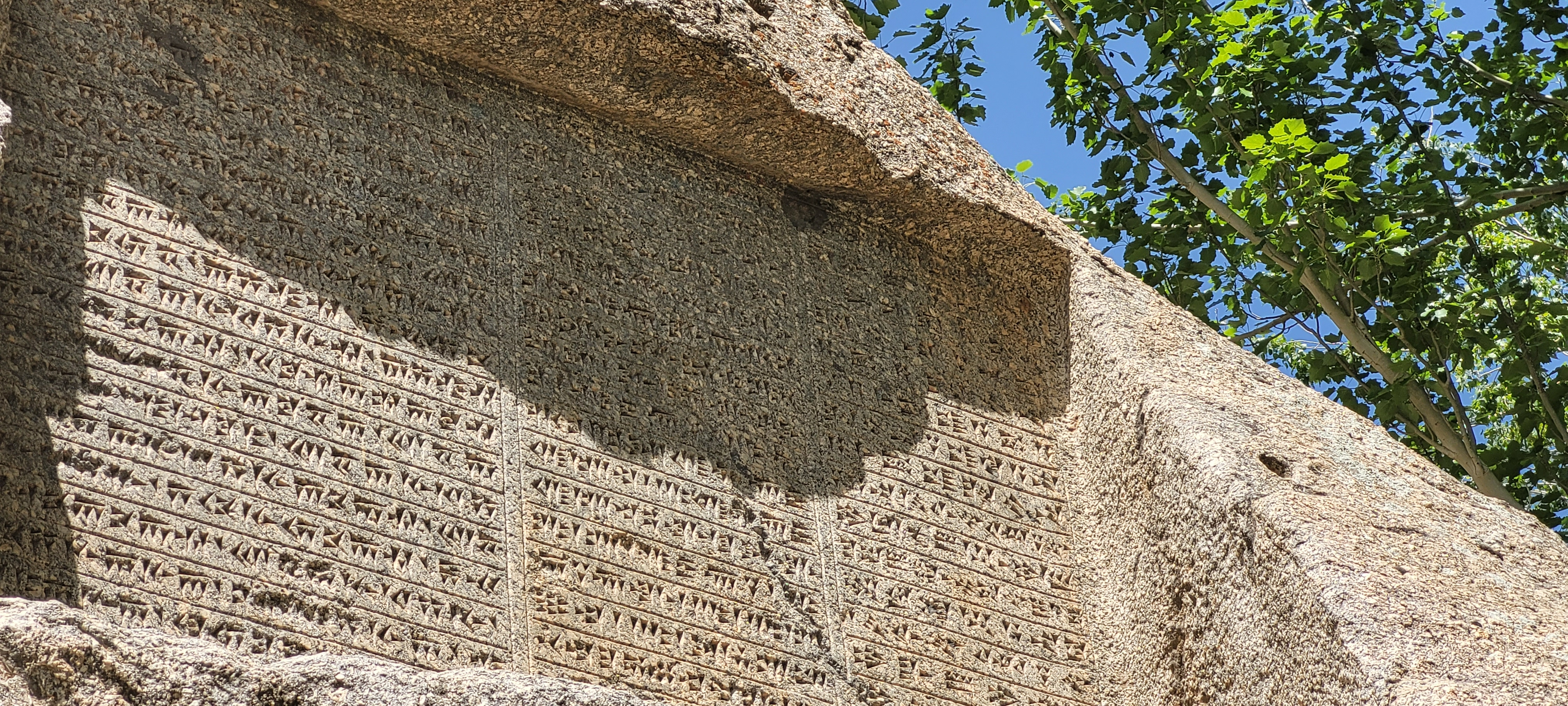
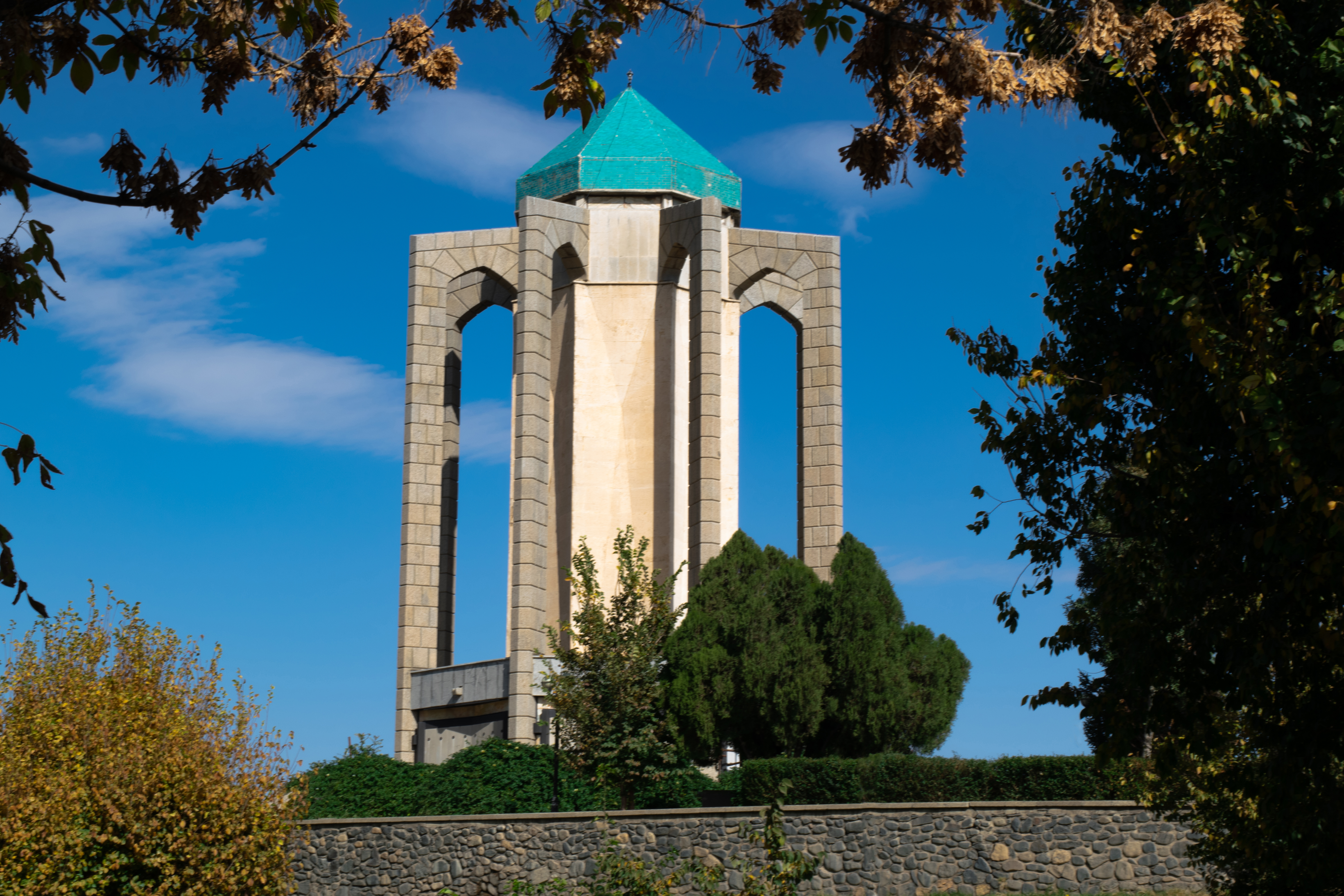
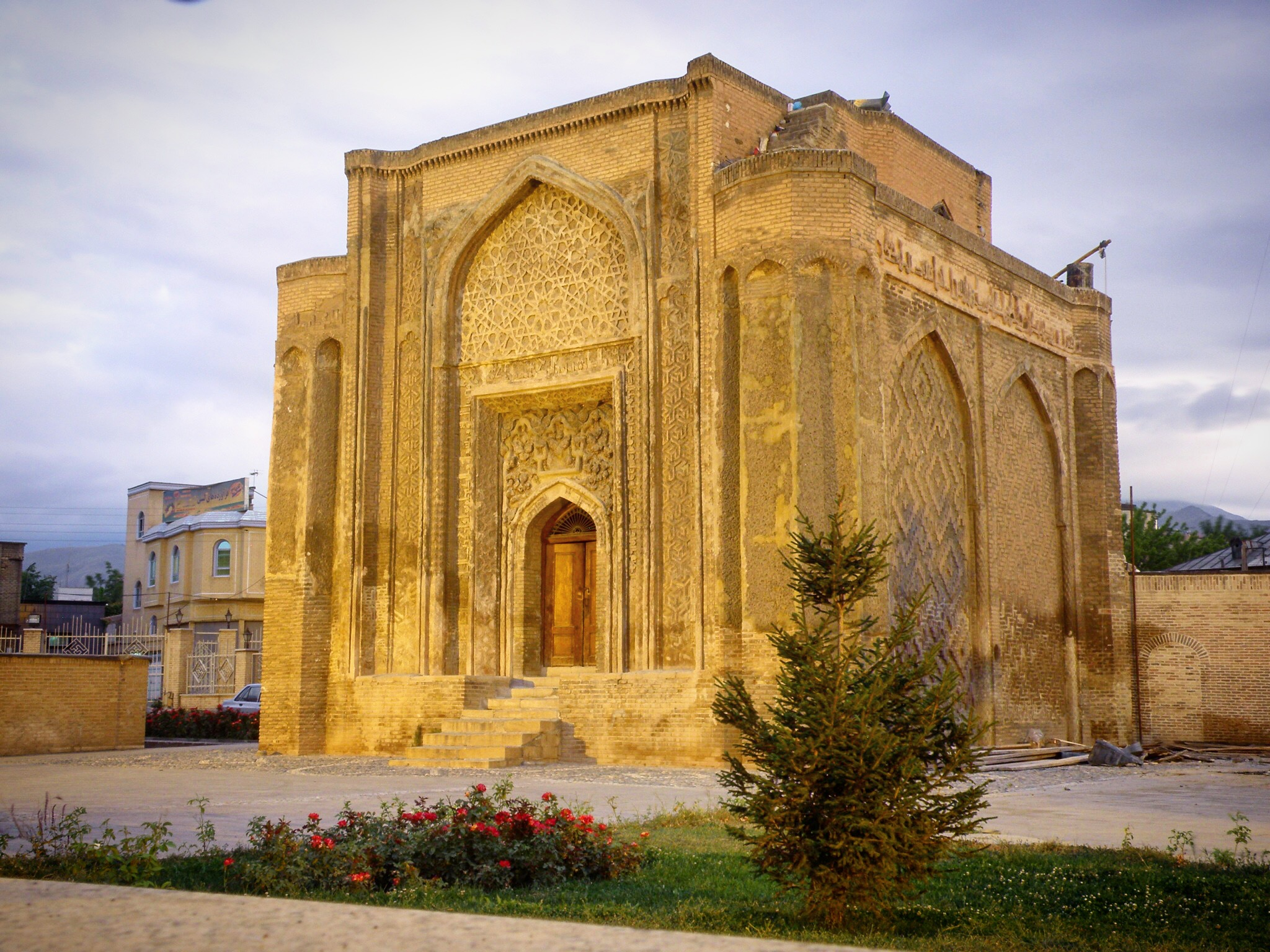
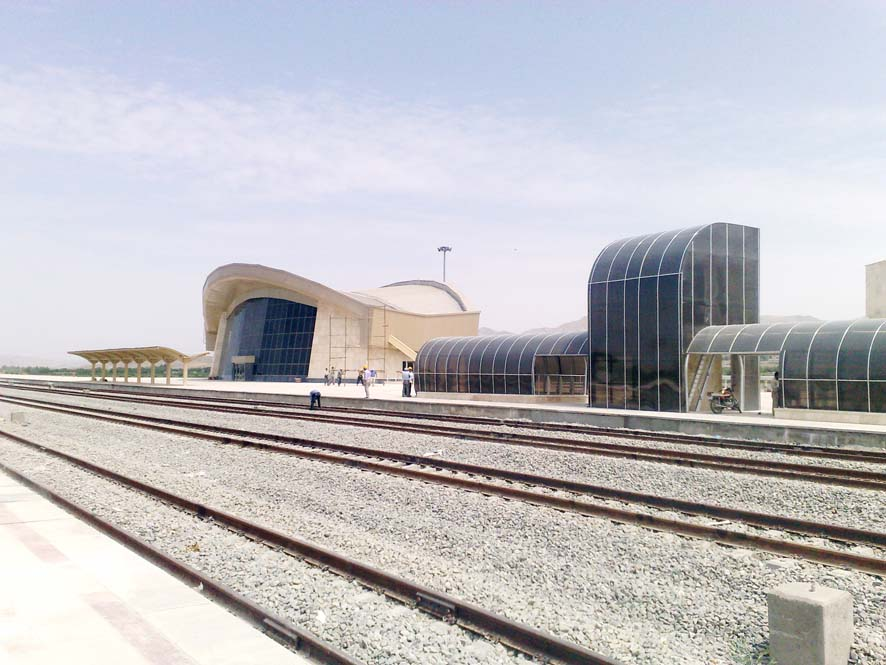
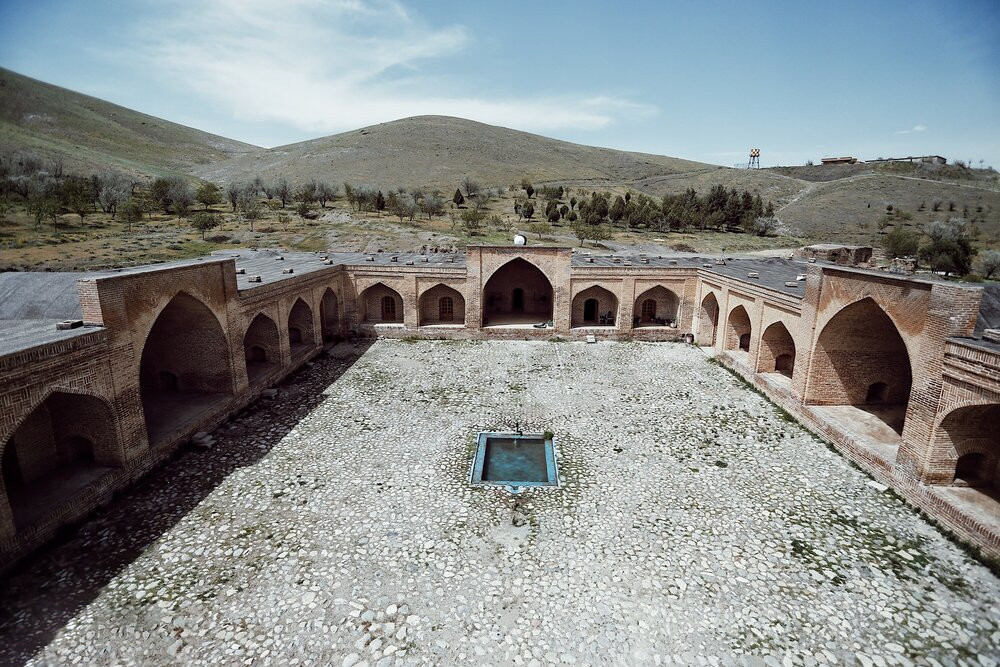

- Location of Hamadan Province within Iran
- Coordinates: 34°45′N 48°30′E
- Country: Iran
- Region: Region 4
- Capital: Hamadan
- Counties: 10

Government
  - Governor-general: Hamid Mollanouri Shamsi (Independent)

Area
  - Total: 19,493 km^{2} (7,526 sq mi)

Population (2016)
  - Total: 1,738,234
  - Density: 89.172/km^{2} (230.95/sq mi)
- Time zone: UTC+03:30 (IRST)
- Area code: 081
- Main language(s): Persian, Azerbaijani, Luri, Kurdish
- HDI (2017): 0.775 high · 22nd
- Website: Official website of Hamadan Governorship

Hamadan Province (Persian: استان همدان) (Note: Also romanized as Ostān-e Hamadān) is one of the 31 provinces of Iran. Its capital is the city of Hamadan. In the Zagros Mountains, the province covers an area of 19,546 km^{2}.

== History ==
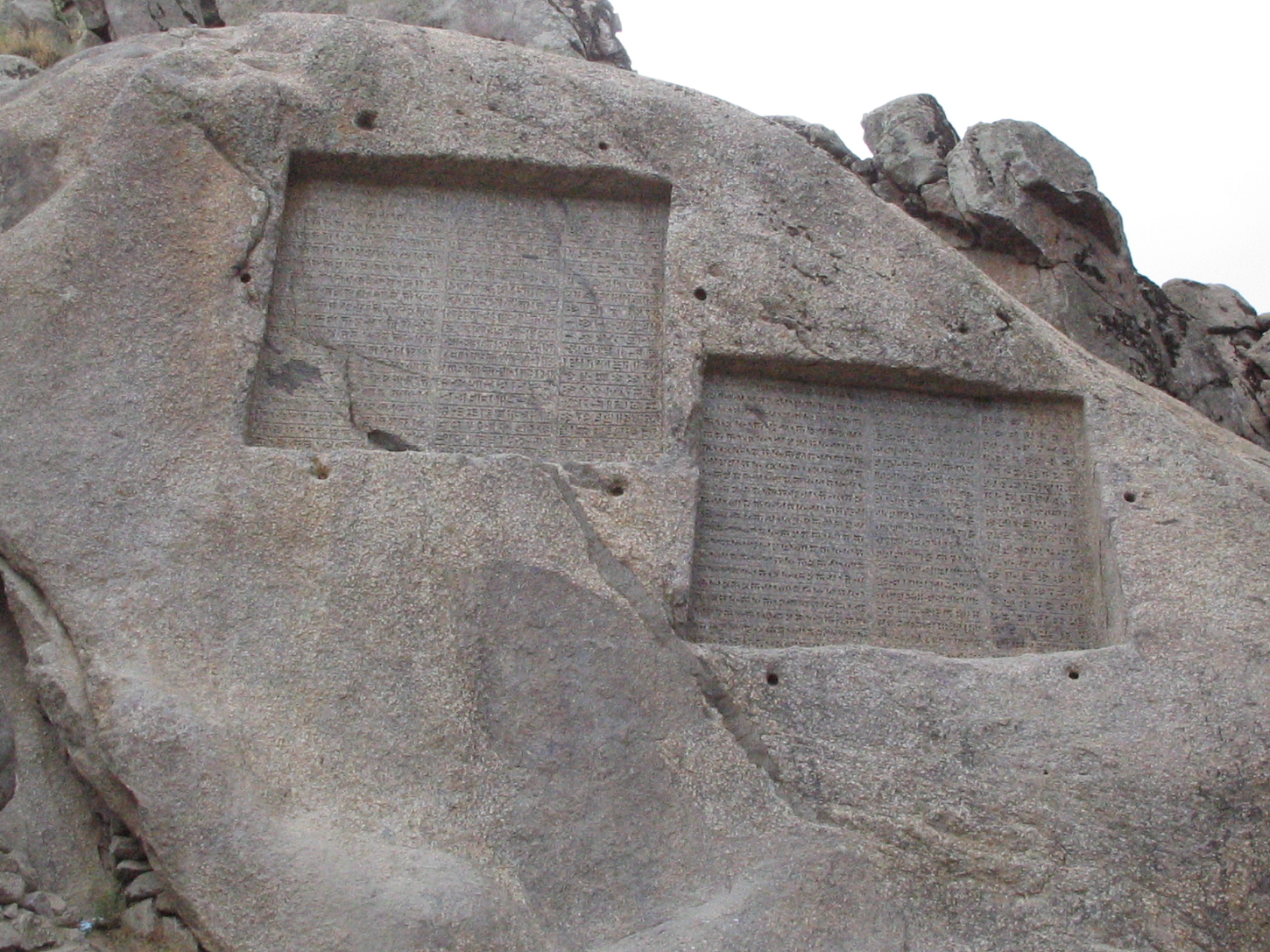
The Achaemenid inscriptions of "Ganj-nameh".

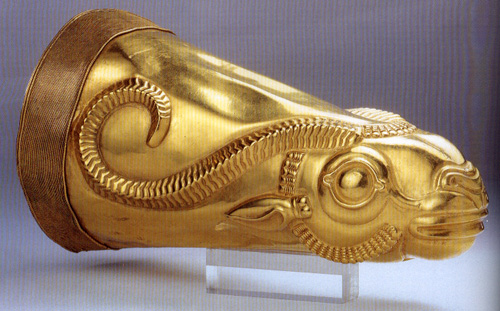
Golden Rhyton, Achaemenid period, excavated in Hamadan.

Hamadan province is one of the most ancient parts of Iran and its civilization. Relics of this area confirm this fact. Today's Hamedan is what is left of Ecbatana, the Medes' capital before they formed a union with the Persians. The poet Ferdowsi says that Ecbatana was built by King Jamshid.

According to historical records, there was once a castle in this city by the name of Haft Hessar (Seven Walls) which was said to have a thousand rooms and its grandeur equalled that of the Babylon Tower.

The structures of city are related to Diya Aku, a King of the Medes from 700 BC. According to Greek records, this territory was called 'Ekbatan' and 'Hegmataneh' by this King, thus transformed into a huge capital.

During the Parthian era, Ctesiphon became capital of Persia, and Hamedan became the summer capital and residence of the Parthian rulers. After the Parthians, the Sassanids constructed their summer palaces in Hamedan as well.

In the year 633 when the war of Nahavand took place and Hamadan came into the hands of the invading Arabs, at times it thrived and at times it declined and witnessed hardships. During the reign of the Buwayhids, it suffered plenty of damage. In the 11th century, the Seljuks shifted their capital from Baghdad to Hamadan once again.

The city of Hamadan was always at risk during the rise and fall of powers. It was completely destroyed during the Timurid invasion. However, during the Safavid era the city thrived once more. In the 18th century, Hamadan surrendered to the Ottomans, but Hamadan was retaken by Nader Shah Afshari, and under the peace treaty between Iran and the Ottomans it was returned to Iran.

The city of Hamadan lay on the Silk Road and even in recent centuries enjoyed good prospects in commerce and trade being on the main road network in the western region of Iran.

According to local Jewish traditions, the City of Hamedan is mentioned in the Bible, as the capital of Ancient Persia in the days of King Ahasuerus in the Book of Esther. It was then known as Shushan. The Tombs of Mordecai and Esther are located in modern-day Hamadan.

== Demographics ==
=== Language ===
In the city of Hamadan and Tuyserkan, most people speak Persian. It is also spoken in some county centers. Persian is also used as a lingua franca in other areas. In the northern part of the province, most people speak Azerbaijani, and in the west, near Kermanshah and Kurdistan provinces, people speak Kurdish. Luri and Laki are also spoken in the southern areas, such as Malayer, Nahavand, and Samen.

Hamadan linguistic composition
language	percent
Turkic	35.00%
Persian	34.10%
Luri	21.01%
Kurdish	8.33%
Other, mixed	1.56%

=== Religion ===
The population of Hamadan province is overwhelmingly Muslim, with 99.88% of residents being Muslims as of 1996. Mostly Shia Muslim, with small populations of Sunni and Zoroastrian.

=== Population ===
As of 1996, Hamadan province had a population of 1,667,957 people, in 342,084 households. A little under half these people (about 811,000, or 48.3%) lived in urban areas. About half of this group lived in the city of Hamadan itself. There has been increased urbanization since the 1990s. About 868,000 people lived in rural villages. About 10,000 people belonged to migratory tribes that spent either the summer (9,128 people) or winter (837 people) in the province. The largest tribe that summers in Hamadan province is the Tork Yaram tribe, with 7,234 members, while the largest tribe that winters in the province is the Torkashvand tribe, with 608 members. As of 1996, there were 1,122 rural villages in the province, with an average population of 773 people. This average is over twice the national average for village size. The population density was 86 people per square kilometer.

Hamadan province has usually had net emigration, except during the Iran–Iraq War when it took in a large number of refugees. This continuing emigration partly offsets the natural growth rate due to births.

Slightly over 77% of the province's population was literate as of 1996 (83.1% for men and 71.3% for women). By this point, however, literacy was much higher in the younger population because access to primary education had increased – for example, the 6-10 age group had a literacy rate of 96.2% for boys and 94.9% for girls. Of the literate population, 53.3% had attended school up to the primary level, 40.2% had attended up to high school, and 4.2% had attended higher education.

Average household size was 4.85 members as of 1996. 67.31% of sedentary, non-communal households consisted of the head of household, spouse, and children; 9.13% consisted of a married couple with no children; 5.1% consisted of a single parent with children; and the remaining 18.5% were other types of households. A total of 8.9% of households had a woman as head of household, and 81.8% of heads of households were employed.

As of 1996, the province had no households living in tents, barracks, or "other makeshift forms of housing". 98.8% of households had access to electricity and 82.8% had access to piped water. 44.2% of households had bathrooms, but there was a significant discrepancy between urban (72.1%) and rural (14.5%) households in this regard. 22.7% of households had telephones in their homes; again, this was significantly higher in urban areas (38.3%) than in rural ones (14.5%). In terms of homeownership, 78.8% of households owned their houses while 10.5% were lease holders.

As of 1997, the average annual urban household income was 11,707,000 rials and the average expenses were 10,317,000 rials or 88% of the income. For rural households, average income was 7,550,000 rials and average expenses were 6,933,000 rials or 92% of the income.

At the time of the 2006 National Census, the province's population was 1,674,595 in 427,675 households. The following census in 2011 counted 1,758,268 people in 506,191 households. In 2014, Hamadan province was placed in Region 4. The 2016 census measured the population of the province as 1,738,234 in 538,803 households.

=== Administrative divisions ===
The current province of Hamadan used to form a part of Kermanshah province. At the 1956 census, the territory of the province belonged to four different governorships (farmān-dāri): Hamadan, Malayer, Nahavand, and Tuyserkan. By the 1966 census, the general governorship (farmān-dāri-e koll) of Hamadan had been created. By the 1976 census, the general governorship had been upgraded to province status.

The population history and structural changes of Hamadan province's administrative divisions over three consecutive censuses are shown in the following table.

Hamadan Province
Counties	2006	2011	2016
Asadabad	104,566	107,006	100,901
Bahar	121,590	123,869	119,082
Dargazin (Note: Separated from Razan County after the 2016 census)	—	—	—
Famenin (Note: Separated from Hamadan County after the 2006 census)	—	42,485	39,359
Hamadan	626,183	651,821	676,105
Kabudarahang	137,919	143,171	126,062
Malayer	285,272	287,982	288,685
Nahavand	178,683	181,711	178,787
Razan	111,120	116,437	107,587
Tuyserkan	109,262	103,786	101,666
Total	1,674,595	1,758,268	1,738,234

=== Cities ===
Among the major cities of the province are Asadabad, Bahar, Famenin, Hamadan, Kabudarahang, Malayer, Nahavand, Razan, and Tuyserkan.

According to the 2016 census, 1,097,217 people (over 63% of the population of Hamadan province) live in the following cities:

City	Population
Ajin	2,738
Asadabad	55,703
Azandarian	11,171
Bahar	28,685
Barzul	2,457
Damaq	3,231
Famenin	14,208
Farasfaj	1,526
Firuzan	5,173
Giyan	8,186
Gol Tappeh	2,237
Hamadan	554,406
Jowkar	2,258
Juraqan	9,234
Kabudarahang	20,336
Lalejin	14,916
Malayer	170,237
Maryanaj	10,848
Mohajeran	7,331
Nahavand	76,162
Qahavand	2,970
Qorveh-e Darjazin	9,540
Razan	14,275
Salehabad	7,899
Samen	3,873
Sarkan	4,081
Shirin Su	2,460
Tuyserkan	50,455
Zangeneh	621

== Geography ==
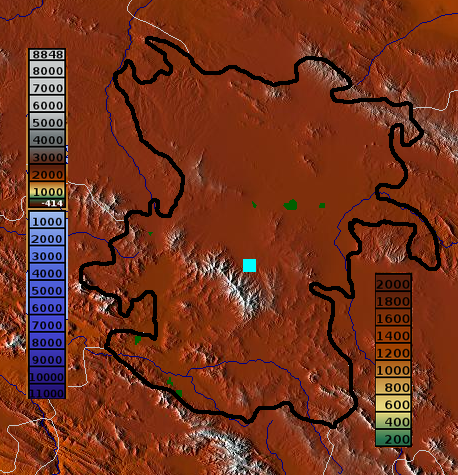
Hamadan province topography map

Hamadan province is located in western Iran, in the eastern reaches of the Zagros Mountains. It covers about 1.2% of Iran's total land area and shares borders with six other provinces. To the north, the province borders Qazvin and Zanjan provinces, with the Kharaqan Mountains forming a natural boundary. The eastern border is with Markazi province. In the south, Mount Garu forms the natural border with Lorestan province. Finally, Hamadan province's western neighbors are Kermanshah and Kordestan provinces.

In general, Hamadan province is a mountainous region. The Alvand range, just south of the city of Hamadan, forms the highest point. Its summit reaches 3,580 m above sea level. The lowest point in the province is 1,420 m above sea level, in the valley of the Gamasiab river near Nahavand. Most of the province's rivers originate in the snowmelt on Mount Alvand and then flow north or south. During the summer, when there is practically no rain, all but the largest rivers either dwindle to parched streams or dry up entirely. There are two major plains in the province: one in the northeast and east, stretching from Hamadan north to Avaj in Qazvin province, and the other in the south, between Tuyserkan to Malayer.

In the past, much of the current province's area was covered with light oak forests, but deforestation in historical times has reduced the forest cover to just 4,100 hectares, mostly in the valleys of Mount Alvand. The vast majority of the province is currently covered by either farmland (950,000 hectares, or about 48% of its total land area) or pastures (905,000 hectares, or almost 46%).

=== Mountains ===
Besides Mount Alvand, Mount Garu, and the Kharaqan range, Hamadan province contains the following major mountains:

- Mount Lashgardar, southeast of Malayer; reaches a height of 2,928 m
- Mount Khangurmaz, in Korzanrud rural district northwest of Tuyserkan; reaches a height of 2,868 m
- Mount Siahdarreh, northwest of Tuyserkan; reaches a height of 2,818 m
- Mount Safid Kuh, in Darjazin-e Olya rural district northeast of Hamadan
- Mount Garma and Mount Sarma, both near Malayer
- Mount Almuqulak, between Asadabad and Bahar; reaches a height of 2,997 m
- Mount Buqati, about 85 km northeast of Hamadan in Sardrud district
- Mount AqDagh, in 55 km of north of Kabudrahang is the biggest mount in this city .

=== Rivers ===
The rivers that flow north and east from Mount Alvand are largely seasonal; they carry far less water in the summer if they flow at all. The main ones are the Talvar and the Qarachay. The Talvar is ultimately a tributary of the Safidrud, the longest river in Iran. It begins on the slopes of the Kuh-e Safid, in the northwest of the province. The Qarachay, which is also called the Siahrud, begins in the Alvand highlands between Hamadan and Malayer. It receives several tributaries in the northern Alvand area, including the Siminarud, the Khaku, and the Farjin. It then flows eastward and eventually reaches Lake Qom in Markazi province.

The main rivers south of the Alvand range are the Gamasiab, which is another name for the Karkheh River in its upper stages, and the Qelqelrud, which is itself a tributary of the Gamasiab. The Gamasiab rises southeast of Nahavand, near the lowest point in the province. It crosses the Nahavand plain before receiving the Malayer and Qelqelrud as tributaries and eventually crosses the Zagros to the southwest.

The most important dam in the province is the Ekbatan Dam (formerly called the Shahnaz Dam), which was built in 1963 on the Yalfan River some 10 km southeast of Hamadan. Its reservoir has a capacity of 12 million cubic meters and it provides 2,400 liters of water per second, which is mostly used for agricultural irrigation.

=== Climate ===
Hamadan province typically has relatively long, cold winters and mild summers. There are usually between 120 and 140 days of frost throughout the year, and mountains are snow-covered for 6–8 months of the year. Temperature extremes range from -32 °C in winter to 39 °C in summer, but average temperatures usually range between -4 °C in December and 25 °C in July. The weather is generally milder the further south one goes. During the winter, the northern plains are exposed to strong winds that blow 4 meters per second on average. These winds are humid and are also accompanied by rainfall. The province receives above-average rainfall, typically averaging 315 mm in a year. Almost no rain falls during the summer, between June and September.

=== Wildlife ===
In the valleys between the province's mountains, there are springs and small lakes that form "semi-autonomous ecosystems" as home for migratory birds. For example, the seasonal marsh of Talab-e Aqgol, 20 km south of Malayer, is visited by 10 to 20 thousand birds every year during their route from the wetlands of Siberia and Scandinavia to warmer regions. These birds live here for 4 to 5 months out of the year. Among the birds that take part in this migration are geese, ducks, herons, cranes, and aigrettes.

Several wildlife reserves in the province are home to other bird and mammal species. Larger birds include royal eagles, golden eagles, falcons, hawks, owls, vultures; and larger mammals include wild goats, ibexes, wild boars, wolves, foxes, jackals, and hyenas. There are about 100 each of wolves, foxes, and jackals in the province, and the hyena population is about 20. These numbers have been fairly stable, and in general the population levels of predators and prey are balanced.

== Economy ==
Because of its above-average rainfall and easy access to water, Hamadan province has a prosperous agricultural base, and agriculture forms its largest economic sector. The province contains 1.2% of the country's total land area, but 4.5% of its total farmland. There are about 950,000 hectares of farmland in Hamadan province, which makes up about 48% of its total area. About a third of this farmland is irrigated, while the remaining two-thirds is under dry farming (in Persian: deym) and has far lower crop yields. About 2.2 to 2.6 million tons of agricultural produce are produced annually in Hamadan province, which is about 4.8% of the country's total. By far the largest crop in terms of area sown is wheat, with barley in a distant second. Potatoes and sugar beets, though sown over a smaller area, have extremely high yields per hectare and as a result make up large shares of the province's produce. About 6.1% of the total farmland is orchards.

Major agricultural products in Hamadan province (as of 1998)
Crop	Area sown (hectares)	Production (tons)	Yield (tons per hectare)
Wheat	396,497	604,162	1.52
Barley	53,119	124,756	2.35
Potato	13,877	405,828	29.24
Sugar beet	10,792	260,775	24.16

Hamadan province is rich in mineral resources. It is the biggest source of granite in the country, and it also has reserves of limestone, lead, iron ore, and zinc. As of 1998, the province had 142 active mines, including 52 sandstone mines, 36 silica mines, 19 ballas mines, 14 limestone mines, and 13 gemstone mines. In 2023, Ebrahim Ali Molla-Beigi, director general of the Exploration Affairs Office of the Iranian Ministry of Industries, Mining and Trade announced the discovery of 8.5 million tons of Lithium reserves in the province.

Small-scale handicraft industry is well-established in the province. Some of the more prominent trades include tanning, carpet weaving, ceramics production, and knitting. As of 1995, there were 266 large-scale factories in the province, employing 8,620 people. These larger factories produce things like agricultural and construction machinery, aluminum products, and steel. Food processing facilities include dairy products, canned fruits, sugar, and soft drinks. Textiles, plastics, and household goods are also produced in the province.

== Attractions ==
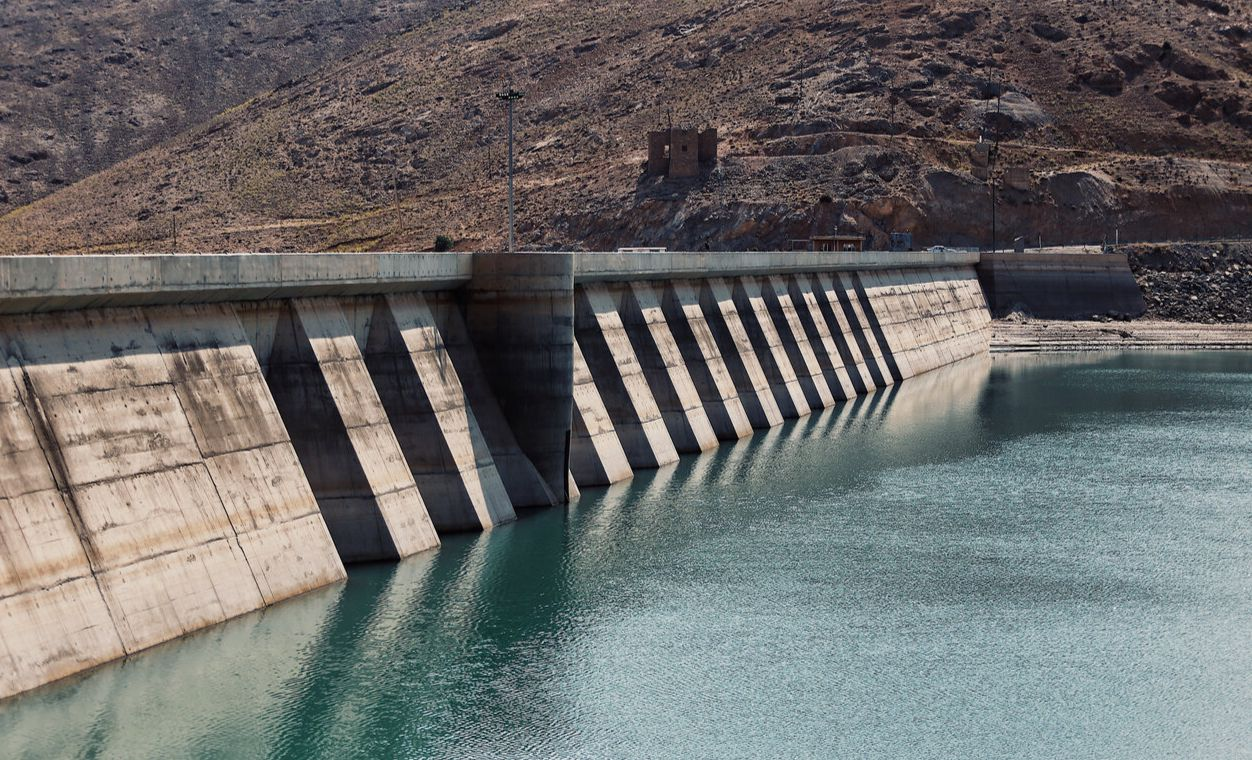
Ekbatan Dam

The Iran National Heritage List lists 442 sites of historical and cultural significance located in Hamadan, thus making the province a rich one in terms of historical attractions.

Some of the most popular tourist attractions are:

- The tomb of poet Baba Taher
- Inscriptions of Darius the Great and Xerxes I at Ganjnameh
- The tomb of Esther and Mordecai
- Ali-Sadr Cave
- The mausoleum of Avicenna
- Waterfall of Ganjnameh
- Stone Lion of Hamadan
- Abass Abad Hill
- Qurban Tower
- Alaviyan Dome
- Eram Park
- Ecbatana, ancient capital of the Median empire
- Imam Square, formerly Pahlavi Square
- Alvand Mountain
- Grand Bazaar of Mozaffarieh

== Colleges and universities ==
- Bu-Ali Sina University
- Hamedan Medical University
- Hamedan University of Technology
- Islamic Azad University of Hamedan
- Islamic Azad University of Nahavand
- Islamic Azad University of Toyserkan
- Malayer University
- Payam Noor University of Bahar
- Payam Noor University of Hamedan
- Payam Noor University of Kabootar Ahang
- Payam Noor University of Nahavand
- Payam Noor University of Razan
- Payam Noor University of Toyserkan
