= Qeshlaq =

Qeshlaq (Persian: قشلاق, meaning "winter quarters", loaned from Turkic), also rendered as Qeshlag, may refer to:

- Kishlak, winter quarters

== Ardabil Province ==
- Qeshlaq, Ardabil, a village in Germi County
- Qeshlaq-e Gharbi Rural District
- Qeshlaq-e Jonubi Rural District
- Qeshlaq-e Sharqi Rural District
- Qeshlaq-e Shomali Rural District

== East Azerbaijan Province ==
- Qeshlaq, Ahar, a village in Ahar County
- Qeshlaq, Azarshahr, a village in Azarshahr County
- Qeshlaq, Jolfa, a village in Jolfa County
- Qeshlaq, Khoda Afarin, a village in Khoda Afarin County
- Qeshlaq, Maragheh, a village in Maragheh County
- Qeshlaq, Meyaneh, a village in Meyaneh County
- Qeshlaq, Kondovan, a village in Meyaneh County
- Qeshlaq, Osku, a village in Osku County
- Qeshlaq, Sarab, a village in Sarab County
- Qeshlaq, Varzaqan, a village in Varzaqan County
- Qeshlaq Rural District (Ahar County)
- Qeshlaq Rural District (Kaleybar County)

== Fars Province ==
- Qeshlaq, Arsanjan, a village in Arsanjan County
- Qeshlaq, Kharameh, a village in Kharameh County
- Qeshlaq, Khorrambid, a village in Khorrambid County
- Qeshlaq Rural District (Fars Province), in Khorrambid County

== Gilan Province ==
- Qeshlaq, Gilan, a village in Siahkal County

== Golestan Province ==
- Qeshlaq, Golestan, Iran

== Hamadan Province ==
- Qeshlaq, Hamadan, Iran
- Qeshlaq, alternate name of Qeshlaq Baba Rostam, Hamadan Province, Iran
- Qeshlaq, alternate name of Qeshlaq-e Dehnow, Hamadan Province, Iran
- Qeshlaq, alternate name of Qeshlaq-e Hameh Kasi, Hamadan Province, Iran
- Qeshlaq, alternate name of Qeshlaq-e Pust Shuran, Hamadan Province, Iran
- Qeshlaq-e Olya, Hamadan, Iran
- Qeshlaq-e Sofla, Iran

== Isfahan Province ==
- Qeshlaq, Isfahan, a village in Golpayegan County

== Kermanshah Province ==
- Qeshlaq-e Olya, Harsin, a village in Harsin County
- Qeshlaq, Kermanshah, a village in Kermanshah County
- Qeshlaq, alternate name of Qeshlaq-e Beznabad, Kermanshah County
- Qeshlaq, Ravansar, a village in Ravansar County
- Qeshlaq-e Olya, Sahneh, a village in Sahneh County
- Qeshlaq-e Vosta, a village in Sahneh County
- Qeshlaq, Sonqor, a village in Sonqor County
- Qeshlaq, Kolyai, a village in Sonqor County

== Kurdistan Province ==
- Qeshlaq, Kurdistan, a village in Saqqez County

== Lorestan Province ==
- Qeshlaq, Lorestan, Iran
- Qeshlaq, alternate name of Kashkak, Lorestan, a village in Lorestan Province, Iran
- Qeshlaq-e Ganjeh, a village in Lorestan Province, Iran

== Markazi Province ==
- Qeshlaq, Markazi, Iran

== North Khorasan Province ==
- Qeshlaq, North Khorasan, Iran
- Qeshlaq, alternate name of Chahar Kharvar, North Khorasan Province, Iran

== Qazvin Province ==
- Qeshlaq, Qazvin, Iran
- Qeshlaq-e Charkhlu, a village in Qazvin Province, Iran

== Razavi Khorasan Province ==
- Qeshlaq, Mashhad, Razavi Khorasan Province, Iran
- Qeshlaq, Quchan, Razavi Khorasan Province, Iran

== Semnan Province ==
- Qeshlaq, former name of Garmsar, Iran

== Tehran Province ==
- Qeshlaq-e Mehrchin, a village in Tehran Province, Iran

== West Azerbaijan Province ==
- Qeshlaq, Bukan, a village in Bukan County
- Qeshlaq, West Azerbaijan, a village in Khoy County
- Qeshlaq-e Shakur, a village in Urmia County

== Zanjan Province ==
- Qeshlaq, Abhar, a village in Abhar County
- Qishlaq, Tarom, a village in Tarom County
- Qeshlaq, Zanjan, a village in Zanjan County

== See also ==
- Qeshlaq is a common element of Iranian place names; see.
- Qışlaq (disambiguation), places in Azerbaijan and Armenia
- Kışla
