= Qeshlaq-e Olya =

Qeshlaq-e Olya or Qeshlaq Olya (Persian: قشلاق عليا) may refer to:

- Qeshlaq-e Olya, Ardabil
- Qeshlaq Olya, East Azerbaijan
- Qeshlaq-e Olya, Hamadan
- Qeshlaq-e Olya, Harsin, Kermanshah Province
- Qeshlaq-e Olya, Sahneh, Kermanshah Province
