= Dashteh =

Dashteh (Persian: دشته) may refer to:

- Dashteh, Hamadan
- Dashteh, West Azerbaijan

== See also ==
- Bala Dashteh, Ilam Province
