= Barkesh =

Barkesh or Barkash (Persian: بركش) may refer to:

- Barkesh, East Azerbaijan
- Barkesh, Hamadan
