= Varkash =

Varkash or Varkesh (Persian: وركش) may refer to:

- Varkash, Alborz
- Varkash, East Azerbaijan
- Varkesh, Hamadan
