= Qowzlujeh =

Qowzlujeh or Qvozlujeh (Persian: قوزلوجه), also rendered as Quzlucheh, may refer to:

- Qowzlujeh, Hamadan
- Qowzlujeh, Mahabad, West Azerbaijan Province
- Qowzlujeh, Hamadan
