= Kishlak =

Winter pasture

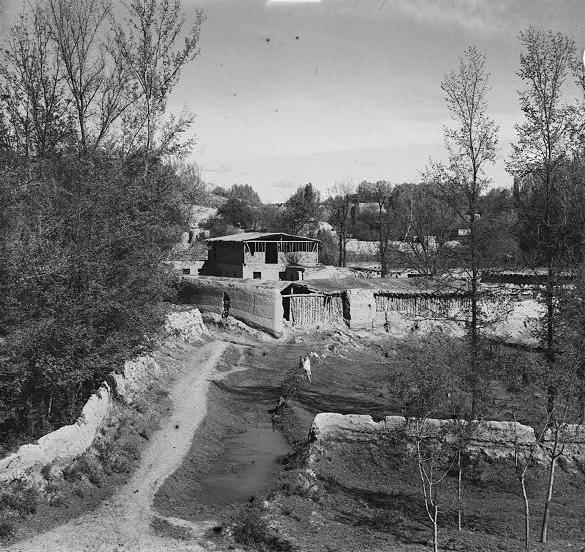
A kishlak near Samarkand of early 1900s

Kishlak or qishlaq (Uzbek: qishloq, Turkmen: gyşlag, Turkish: kışlak, Azerbaijani: qışlaq, Persian: قشلاق), or qıştaq (Kyrgyz: кыштак) qıstaw (Kazakh: қыстау) is a rural settlement of semi-nomadic Turkic peoples of Central Asia and Azerbaijan. The meaning of the term is "wintering place" in Turkic languages (derives from Turkic qış - winter).

The converse term is yaylaq, a summer pasture.

Traditionally, a clay/mud fence (dewal, duval, from Persian: دیوار divār) surrounds a kishlak.

The term may be seen in the toponyms, such as Afgan-Kishlak (Uzbekistan), Yangi-Kishlak (Turkmenistan), Mangyshlak (Kazakhstan), Qışlaq (Azerbaijan) or Qeshlaq in Iran (such as Qeshlaq, Qareh Qeshlaq, and Qeshlaq Khas).

== Gallery ==
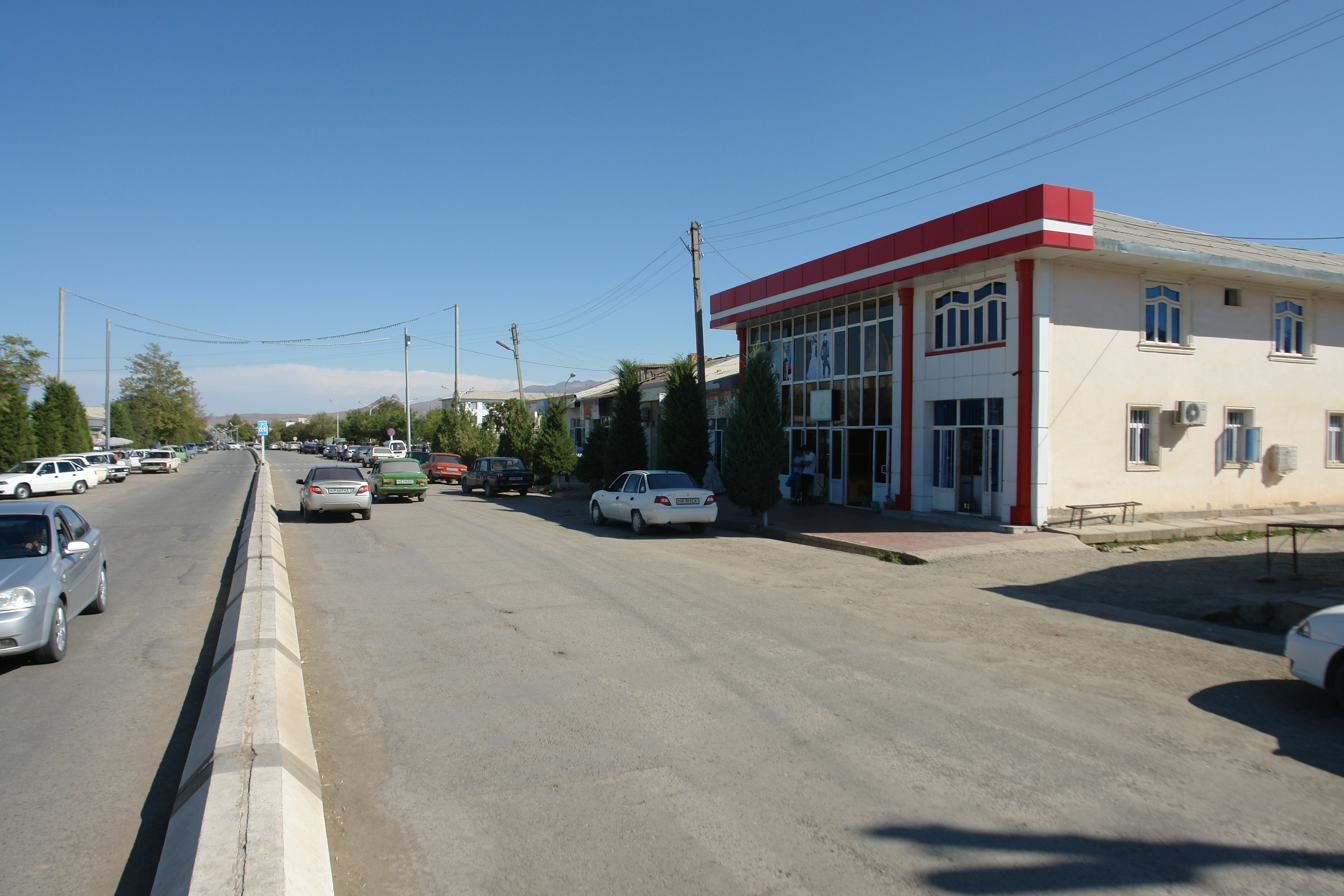
Kishlak in Djizak region of Uzbekistan

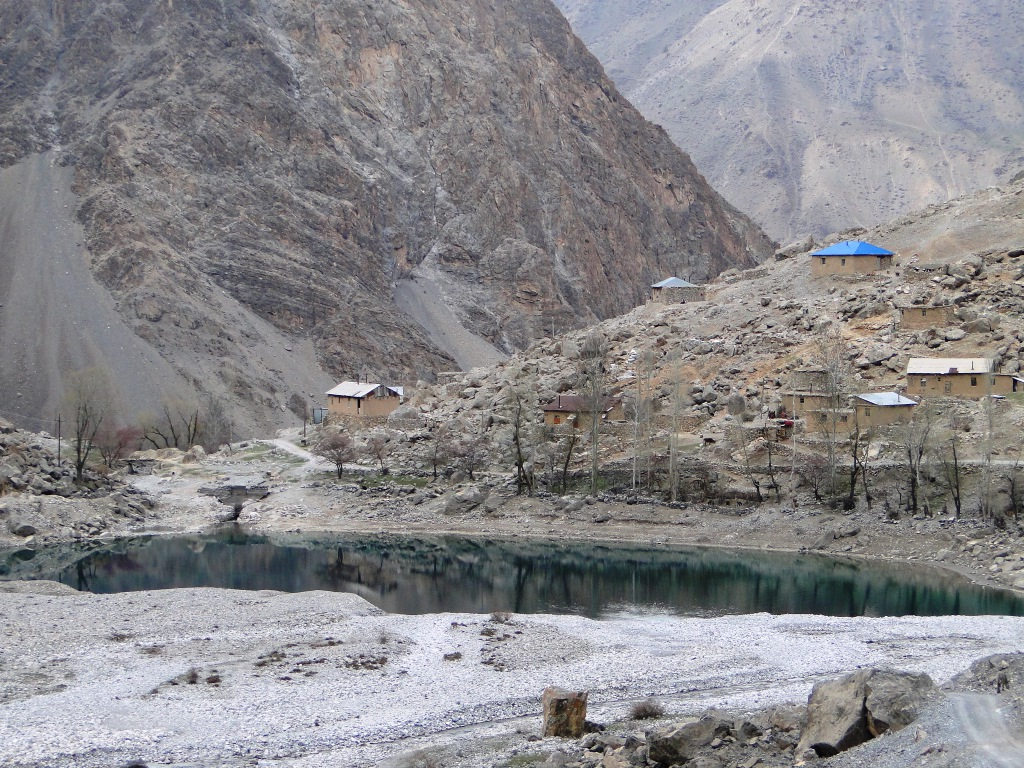
Mountain village in Tajikistan

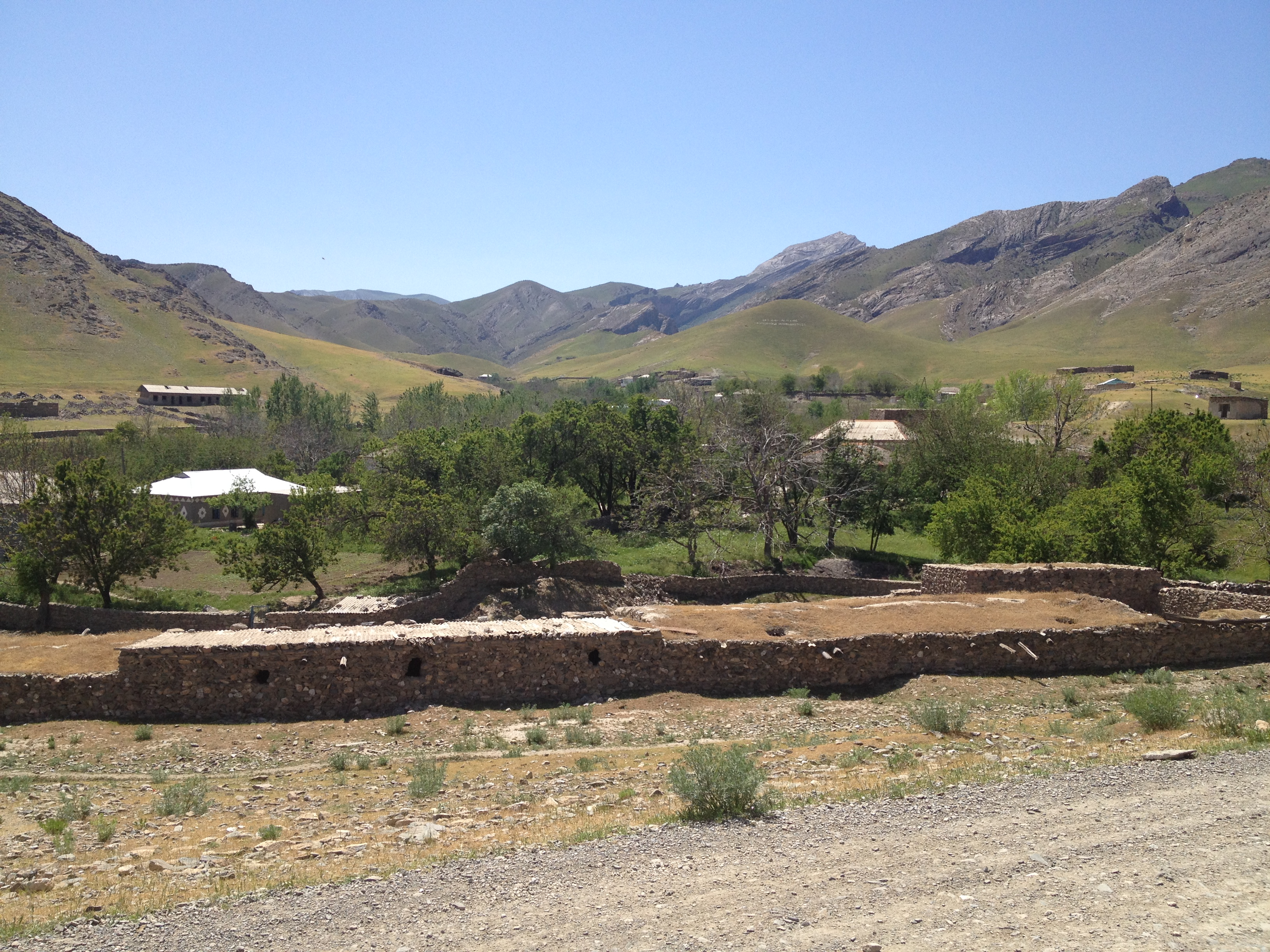
Sap village in Navoi region of Uzbekistan

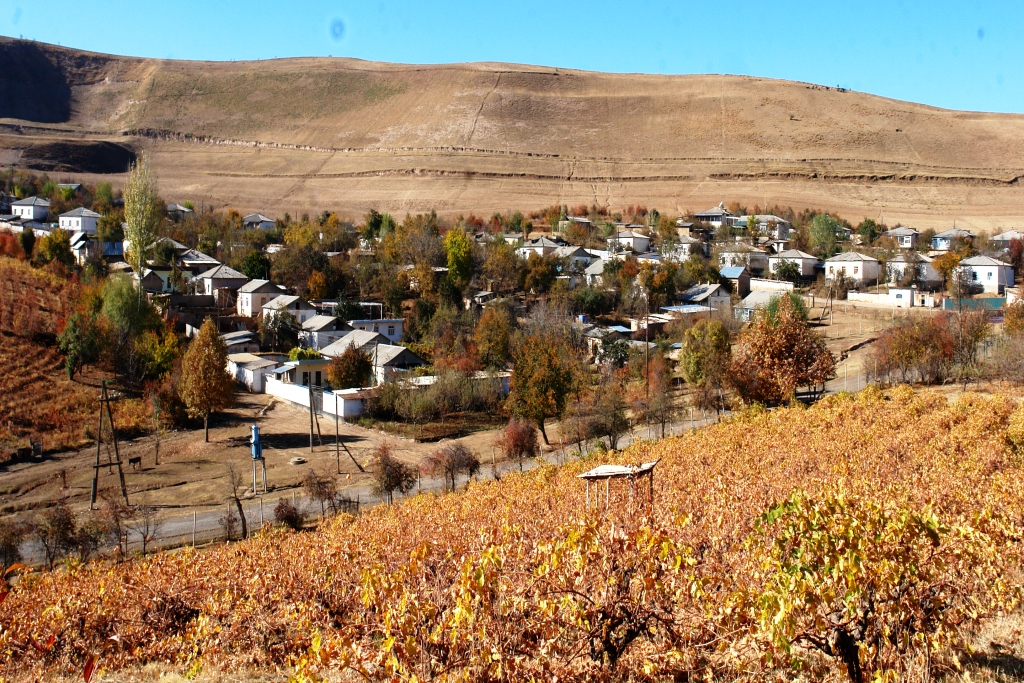
The village of Bobosurkhon in the Gissar district of Tajikistan

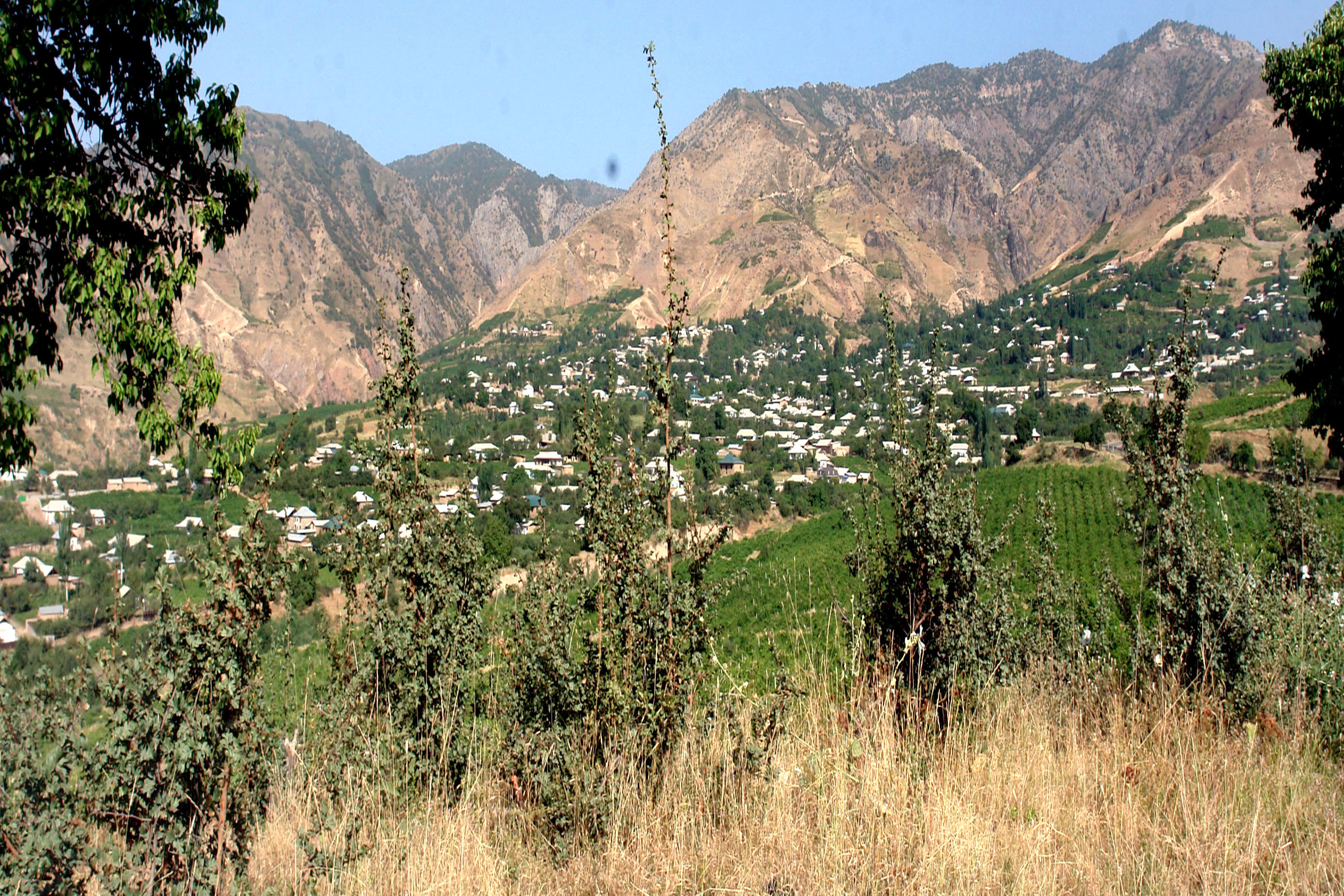
Kishlak Nilu in Gissar district of Tajikistan

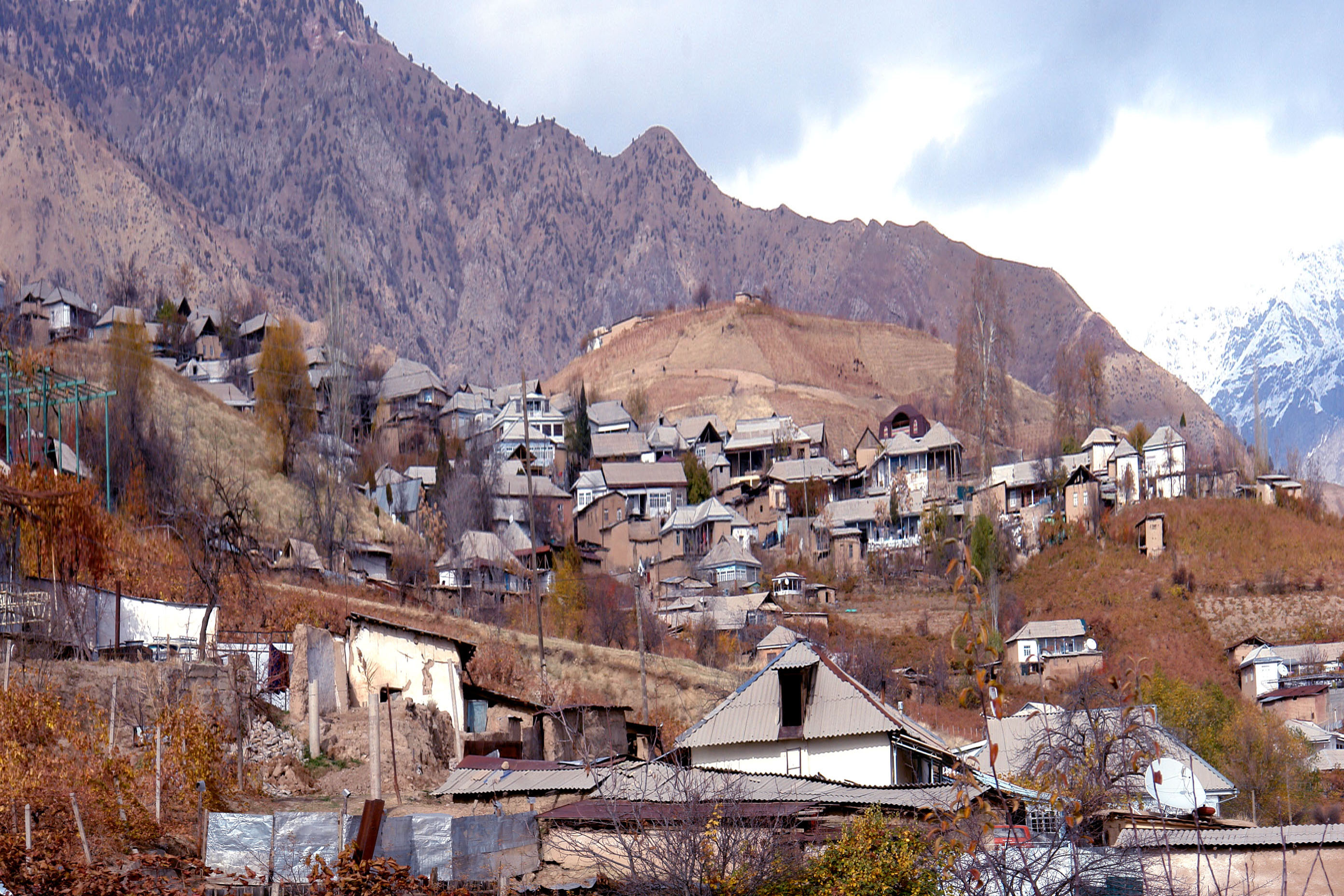
Shohon village in the Gissar district of Tajikistan

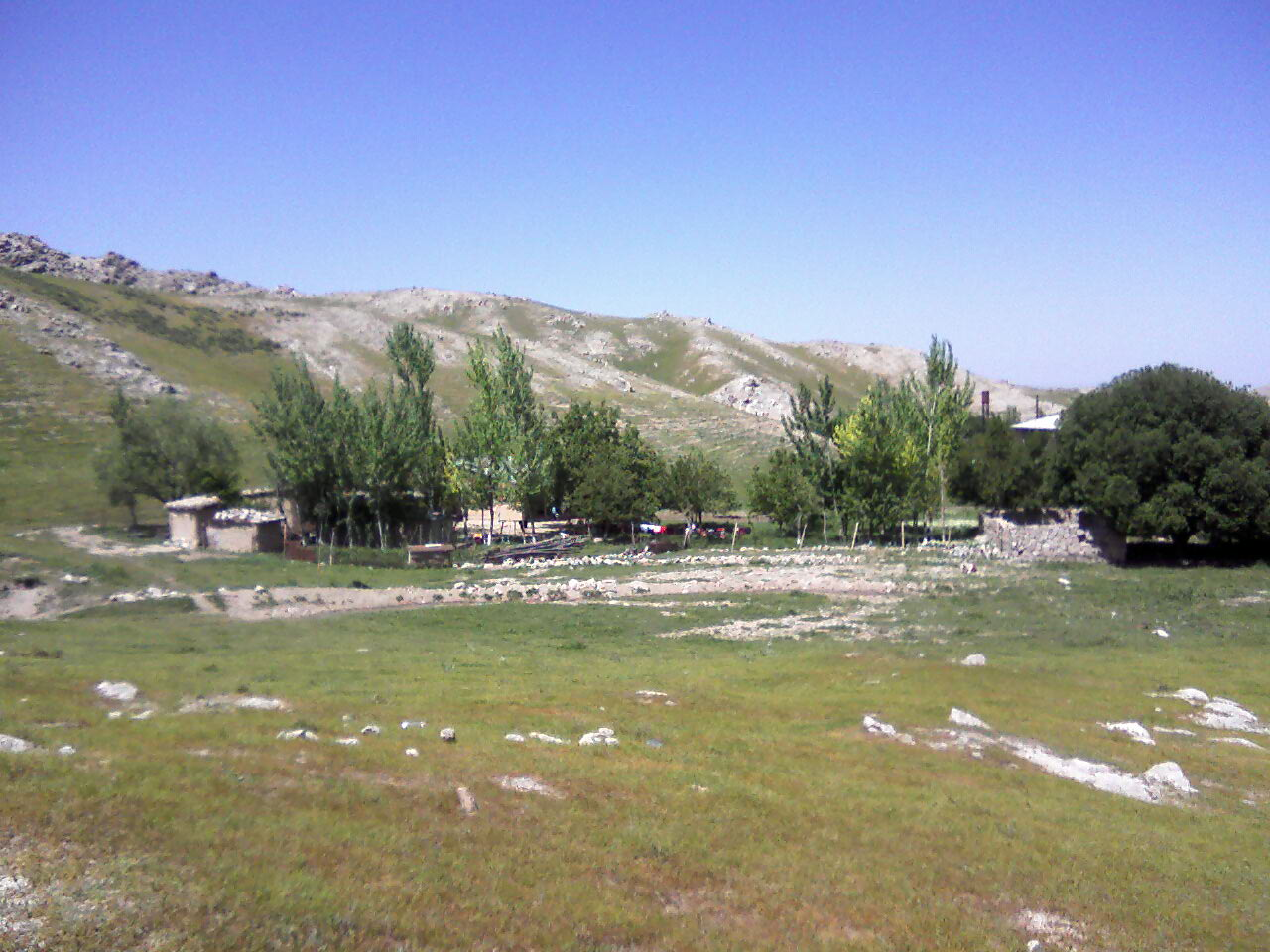
Mirankul kishlak in the Samarkand region of Uzbekistan

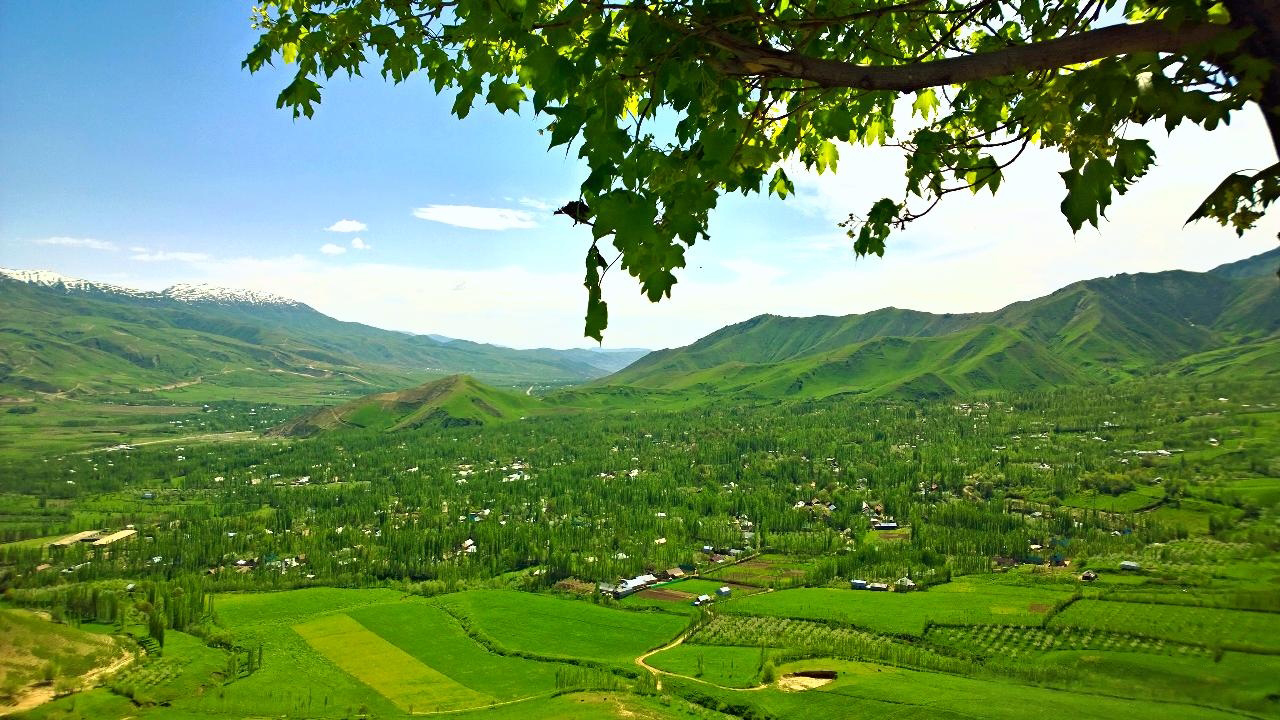
Elok village in Faizabad district of Tajikistan

== See also ==
- Aul
