= Ab Anbar (disambiguation) =

Ab anbar is a traditional reservoir or cistern of drinking water in Greater Iran in antiquity.

Ab anbar or Ab Anbar may also refer to:

- Ab Anbar, Hamadan
- Ab Anbar-e Jahad Ashayiri, Fars Province
