= Yeserlu =

Village in Hamadan province, Iran

Yeserlu Persian: يسرلو
- Village
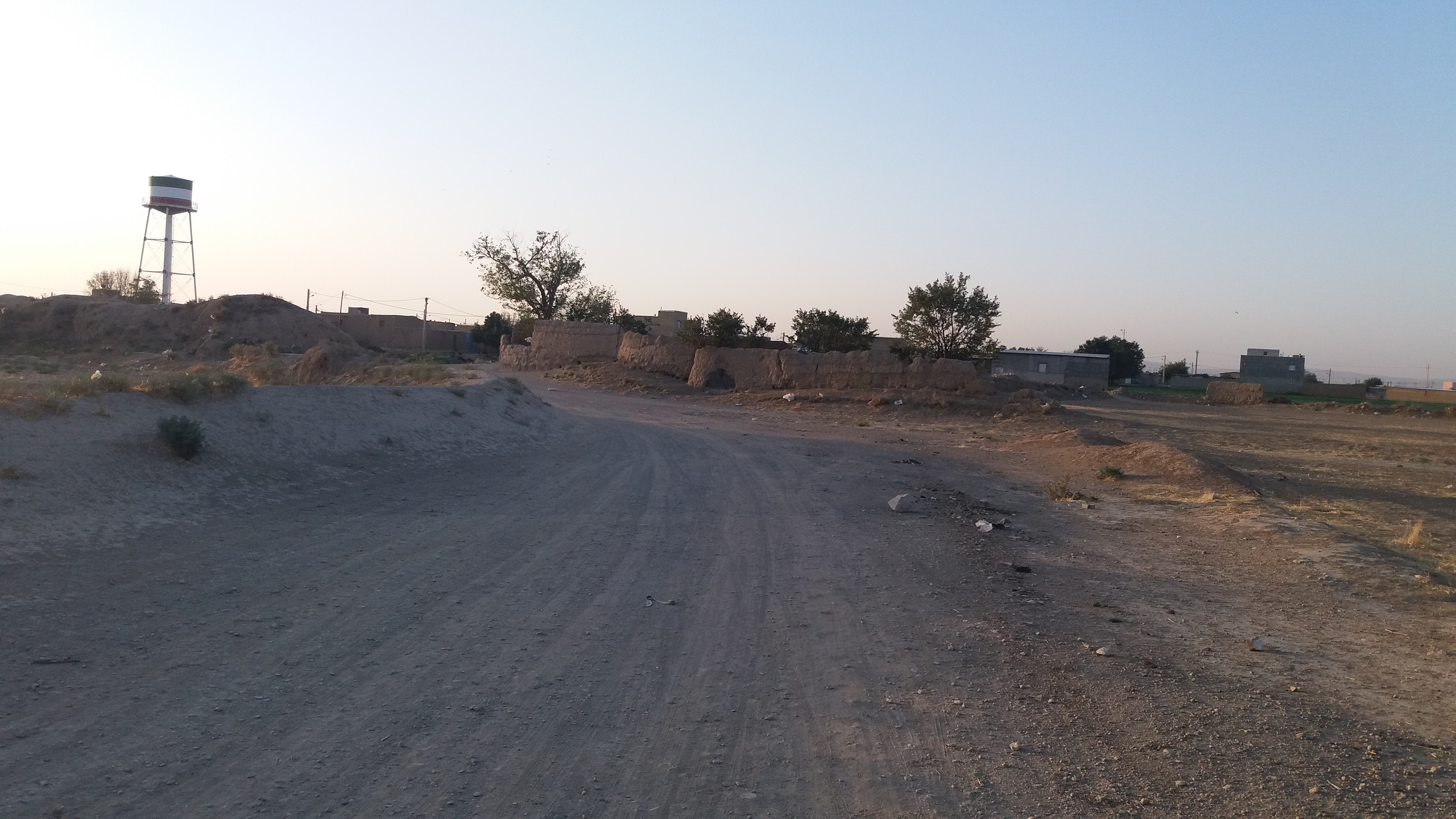
- Road leading to the village of Yeserlu

- Location within Iran
- Coordinates: 35°03′38″N 48°47′01″E
- Country: Iran
- Province: Hamadan
- County: Hamadan
- District: Shara
- Rural District: Chah Dasht

Population (2016)
  - Total: 1,019
- Time zone: UTC+3:30 (IRST)

Yeserlu (Persian: يسرلو) (Note: Also romanized as Yeserlū and Yesreloo; also known as Yassarli) is a village in Chah Dasht Rural District of Shara District in Hamadan County, Hamadan province, Iran.

== Demographics ==
=== Population ===
At the time of the 2006 National Census, the village's population was 1,172 in 231 households. The following census in 2011 counted 1,117 people in 319 households. The 2016 census measured the population of the village as 1,019 people in 291 households.
