= Khomajin =

Khomajin (Persian: خماجين) may refer to:

- Khomajin, Famenin, Hamadan Province
- Khomajin, Hamadan
