= Qepchaq, Hamadan =

Village in Hamadan province, Iran

Qepchaq Persian: قپچاق
- Village
- Location within Iran
- Coordinates: 34°57′43″N 48°49′21″E
- Country: Iran
- Province: Hamadan
- County: Hamadan
- District: Shara
- Rural District: Chah Dasht

Population (2016)
  - Total: 141
- Time zone: UTC+3:30 (IRST)

Qepchaq (Persian: قپچاق) (Note: Also romanized as Qepchāq) is a village in Chah Dasht Rural District of Shara District in Hamadan County, Hamadan province, Iran.

== Demographics ==
=== Population ===
At the time of the 2006 National Census, the village's population was 181 in 41 households. The following census in 2011 counted 180 people in 49 households. The 2016 census measured the population of the village as 141 people in 41 households.
