= Kheyrabad, Shara =

Village in Hamadan province, Iran

Kheyrabad Persian: خيراباد
- Village
- Location within Iran
- Coordinates: 34°45′10″N 49°02′16″E
- Country: Iran
- Province: Hamadan
- County: Hamadan
- District: Shara
- Rural District: Shur Dasht

Population (2016)
  - Total: 455
- Time zone: UTC+3:30 (IRST)

Kheyrabad (Persian: خيراباد) (Note: Also romanized as Kheyrābād; also known as Khaīrābād) is a village in Shur Dasht Rural District of Shara District in Hamadan County, Hamadan province, Iran.

== Demographics ==
=== Population ===
At the time of the 2006 National Census, the village's population was 654 in 124 households. The following census in 2011 counted 544 people in 129 households. The 2016 census measured the population of the village as 455 people in 124 households.
