= Qeshlaq-e Sofla =

Qeshlaq-e Sofla قشلاق سفلي
- Village
- Location within Iran
- Coordinates: 34°42′03″N 49°04′11″E
- Country: Iran
- Province: Hamadan
- County: Hamadan
- Bakhsh: Shara
- Rural District: Shur Dasht

Population (2006)
  - Total: 97
- Time zone: UTC+3:30 (IRST)
  - Summer (DST): UTC+4:30 (IRDT)

Qeshlaq-e Sofla (Persian: قشلاق سفلي, also Romanized as Qeshlāq-e Soflá; also known as Qeshlāq-e Khosrow Khān and Qeshlāq-e Khosrow Khānī) is a village in Shur Dasht Rural District, Shara District, Hamadan County, Hamadan Province, Iran. At the 2006 census, its population was 97, in 25 families.
