= Hajji Maqsud =

Village in Hamadan province, Iran

Hajji Maqsud Persian: حاجي مقصود
- Village
- Location within Iran
- Coordinates: 34°58′11″N 48°52′47″E
- Country: Iran
- Province: Hamadan
- County: Hamadan
- District: Shara
- Rural District: Chah Dasht

Population (2016)
  - Total: 76
- Time zone: UTC+3:30 (IRST)

Hajji Maqsud (Persian: حاجي مقصود) (Note: Also romanized as Ḩājī Maqşūd and Ḩājjī Maqşūd) is a village in Chah Dasht Rural District of Shara District in Hamadan County, Hamadan province, Iran.

== Demographics ==
=== Population ===
At the time of the 2006 National Census, the village's population was 73 in 21 households. The following census in 2011 counted 76 people in 21 households. The 2016 census measured the population of the village as 76 people in 22 households.
