= Ahmadabad-e Tappeh =

Village in Hamadan province, Iran

Ahmadabad-e Tappeh Persian: احمدابادتپه
- Village
- Location within Iran
- Coordinates: 34°36′45″N 48°59′42″E
- Country: Iran
- Province: Hamadan
- County: Hamadan
- District: Shara
- Rural District: Shur Dasht

Population (2016)
  - Total: 505
- Time zone: UTC+3:30 (IRST)

Ahmadabad-e Tappeh (Persian: احمدابادتپه) (Note: Also romanized as Aḩmadābād-e Tappeh; also known as Aḩmadābād) is a village in Shur Dasht Rural District of Shara District in Hamadan County, Hamadan province, Iran.

== Demographics ==
=== Population ===
At the time of the 2006 National Census, the village's population was 615 in 129 households. The following census in 2011 counted 608 people in 164 households. The 2016 census measured the population of the village as 505 people in 163 households.
