= Shirinabad, Shara =

Village in Hamadan province, Iran

Shirinabad Persian: شيرين اباد
- Village
- Location within Iran
- Coordinates: 34°47′29″N 49°06′37″E
- Country: Iran
- Province: Hamadan
- County: Hamadan
- District: Shara
- Rural District: Jeyhun Dasht

Population (2016)
  - Total: 640
- Time zone: UTC+3:30 (IRST)

Shirinabad (Persian: شيرين اباد) (Note: Also romanized as Shīrīnābād) is a village in Jeyhun Dasht Rural District of Shara District in Hamadan County, Hamadan province, Iran.

== Demographics ==
=== Population ===
At the time of the 2006 National Census, the village's population was 708 in 145 households. The following census in 2011 counted 743 people in 193 households. The 2016 census measured the population of the village as 640 people in 170 households.
