= Gonbad Chay =

Village in Hamadan province, Iran

Gonbad Chay Persian: گنبدچاي
- Village
- Location within Iran
- Coordinates: 34°52′11″N 48°50′03″E
- Country: Iran
- Province: Hamadan
- County: Hamadan
- District: Shara
- Rural District: Jeyhun Dasht

Population (2016)
  - Total: 609
- Time zone: UTC+3:30 (IRST)

Gonbad Chay (Persian: گنبدچاي) (Note: Also romanized as Gonbad Chā’ī and Gonbad Chāy; also known as Komeh Chāy and Kumma Chāi) is a village in Jeyhun Dasht Rural District of Shara District in Hamadan County, Hamadan province, Iran.

== Demographics ==
=== Population ===
At the time of the 2006 National Census, the village's population was 568 in 139 households. The following census in 2011 counted 605 people in 171 households. The 2016 census measured the population of the village as 609 people in 190 households.
