= Qerkhlar, Hamadan =

Village in Hamadan province, Iran

Qerkhlar Persian: قرخلر
- Village
- Location within Iran
- Coordinates: 35°03′02″N 48°44′54″E
- Country: Iran
- Province: Hamadan
- County: Hamadan
- District: Shara
- Rural District: Chah Dasht

Population (2016)
  - Total: 1,568
- Time zone: UTC+3:30 (IRST)

Qerkhlar (Persian: قرخلر) (Note: Also romanized as Qarkhlār and Qerekhlar; also known as Gherkhlar) is a village in Chah Dasht Rural District of Shara District in Hamadan County, Hamadan province, Iran.

== Demographics ==
=== Population ===
At the time of the 2006 National Census, the village's population was 1,962 in 431 households. The following census in 2011 counted 1,788 people in 479 households. The 2016 census measured the population of the village as 1,568 people in 436 households, the most populous in its rural district.
