= Quzlijeh, Hamadan =

Quzlujeh قوزليجه
- Village
- Location within Iran
- Coordinates: 34°45′14″N 48°55′19″E
- Country: Iran
- Province: Hamadan
- County: Hamadan
- Bakhsh: Shara
- Rural District: Shur Dasht

Population (2006)
  - Total: 70
- Time zone: UTC+3:30 (IRST)
  - Summer (DST): UTC+4:30 (IRDT)

Quzlujeh (Persian: قوزليجه, also Romanized as Qūzlījeh; also known as Qūzlūjeh, Qowzlūjeh, Ghozlijeh, Quzlajah, and Qūzlūcheh) is a village in Shur Dasht Rural District, Shara District, Hamadan County, Hamadan Province, Iran. At the 2006 census, its population was 70, in 20 families.
