= Kowzareh =

Village in Hamadan province, Iran

Kowzareh Persian: كوزره
- Village
- Location within Iran
- Coordinates: 34°41′54″N 49°00′36″E
- Country: Iran
- Province: Hamadan
- County: Hamadan
- District: Shara
- Rural District: Shur Dasht

Population (2016)
  - Total: 1,864
- Time zone: UTC+3:30 (IRST)

Kowzareh (Persian: كوزره) (Note: Also romanized as Koozreh; also known as Gū Zereh, Kūh Zareh, Kūh Zereh, Kūrza, and Kūzra) is a village in, and the capital of, Shur Dasht Rural District in Shara District of Hamadan County, Hamadan province, Iran.

== Demographics ==
=== Population ===
At the time of the 2006 National Census, the village's population was 2,140 in 495 households. The following census in 2011 counted 2,029 people in 581 households. The 2016 census measured the population of the village as 1,864 people in 557 households, the most populous in its rural district.
