= Now Deh, Shara =

Village in Hamadan province, Iran

Now Deh Persian: نوده
- Village
- Location within Iran
- Coordinates: 35°02′11″N 48°54′52″E
- Country: Iran
- Province: Hamadan
- County: Hamadan
- District: Shara
- Rural District: Chah Dasht

Population (2016)
  - Total: 103
- Time zone: UTC+3:30 (IRST)

Now Deh (Persian: نوده) (Note: Also known as Now Deh-e Qarah Bāghī) is a village in Chah Dasht Rural District of Shara District in Hamadan County, Hamadan province, Iran.

== Demographics ==
=== Population ===
At the time of the 2006 National Census, the village's population was 231 in 63 households. The following census in 2011 counted 185 people in 61 households. The 2016 census measured the population of the village as 103 people in 37 households.
