= Idahlu, Shara =

Village in Hamadan province, Iran

Idahlu Persian: ايده لو
- Village
- Location within Iran
- Coordinates: 34°59′23″N 48°51′38″E
- Country: Iran
- Province: Hamadan
- County: Hamadan
- District: Shara
- Rural District: Chah Dasht

Population (2016)
  - Total: 57
- Time zone: UTC+3:30 (IRST)

Idahlu (Persian: ايده لو) (Note: Also romanized as Īdahlū; also known as Īdlū) is a village in Chah Dasht Rural District of Shara District in Hamadan County, Hamadan province, Iran.

== Demographics ==
=== Population ===
At the time of the 2006 National Census, the village's population was 66 in 14 households. The following census in 2011 counted 69 people in 19 households. The 2016 census measured the population of the village as 57 people in 17 households.
