= Milajerd (disambiguation) =

Milajerd is a city in Markazi province, Iran.

Milajerd or Milajord (Persian: ميلاجرد) may also refer to:

- Milajerd, Hamadan
- Milajerd, Isfahan
- Milajerd District, in Markazi province
- Milajerd Rural District, in Markazi province
