= Barakatabad =

Barakatabad may refer to the following places in Iran:

- Barakatabad, Hamadan
- Barakatabad, Lorestan
