= Hizaj =

Village in Hamadan province, Iran

Hizaj Persian: هيزج
- Village
- Location within Iran
- Coordinates: 34°55′48″N 49°08′36″E
- Country: Iran
- Province: Hamadan
- County: Hamadan
- District: Shara
- Rural District: Jeyhun Dasht

Population (2016)
  - Total: 905
- Time zone: UTC+3:30 (IRST)

Hizaj (Persian: هيزج) (Note: Also romanized as Hīzaj; also known as Ḩayzaj and Hīzzach) is a village in Jeyhun Dasht Rural District of Shara District in Hamadan County, Hamadan province, Iran.

== Demographics ==
=== Population ===
At the time of the 2006 National Census, the village's population was 943 in 210 households. The following census in 2011 counted 1,005 people in 276 households. The 2016 census measured the population of the village as 905 people in 266 households.
