= Barakatabad, Hamadan =

Barakatabad بركت اباد
- Village
- Location within Iran
- Coordinates: 34°46′12″N 48°55′29″E
- Country: Iran
- Province: Hamadan
- County: Hamadan
- Bakhsh: Shara
- Rural District: Jeyhun Dasht

Population (2006)
  - Total: 131
- Time zone: UTC+3:30 (IRST)
  - Summer (DST): UTC+4:30 (IRDT)

Barakatabad (Persian: بركت اباد, also Romanized as Barakatābād, Barekatābād, and Barkatābād) is a village in Jeyhun Dasht Rural District, Shara District, Hamadan County, Hamadan Province, Iran. At the 2006 census, its population was 131, in 28 families.
