= Burbur (tribe) =

Lur tribe in Iran

The Burbur or Borbor (Persian: بوربور، بُربُر) are a Lur tribe living in Iran. They are dispersed throughout Iran and speak several other languages and follow Shia Islam. Many of them are integrated among other tribes.

== Origin ==
Parviz Tanavoli wrote that the Burbur tribe possibly had Bakhtiari origin and were settled in Varamin by Nader Shah, where the locals called them "Esfahani". According to Dariush Borbor, the Burbur tribe had Lur origin and traditionally spoke northern Luri, also called Feyli, but were historically often mislabelled by scholars as others due to their early settlement pattern and their gradual assimilation and adoption of other languages, such as the Turkic-speaking Burbur among the Qashqai who were mislabeled as Turks, and the Kurdish-speaking Burbur around Varamin who were mislabeled as Kurds. The Burbur tribe follow Shia Islam. The Burbur tribe, depending on location, were variously multilingual in Persian, Luri, Kurdish, and Turkic.

== Etymology ==
The term "Burbur" was diversely associated with the lexeme "bur" from Pahlavi "bōr", meaning a "[brand of] horse", a certain color denomination "reddish-brown, bay (horse)", or "ten thousand; large number; numerous". According to Dariush Borbor, "taking into account the widespread ancient and modern practice of tribal names being formed from numerals, combined with the tradition of the large original size of the Burbur tribe, the reduplicated ethnonym is likely to have had the connotation of 'large number, countless, many,' cf. Av. baēvar-, Mid. West. Iranian bēwar 'ten thousand, myriad'." He added that "if -būr- is from bēvar, then the reduplicated compound Būr-būr, as an ethnic or tribal name, seems to denote 'a huge amount (of people), a multitude (of people), crowd, numerous' as in Armenian biwr-biwr (=biwravor)." Their name in Persian was variously spelled بوربور or بُربُر.

== History ==
According to Dariush Borbor, the Burbur tribe were characterized by two key historical occurrences, the first being related to the fact that many of the Burbur became sedentary around Hamadan and Malayer, before the 16th century, and later Varamin, and the second being the result of the large scale of settlement, which fragmented and significantly reduced the migrating element of the tribe to such an extent that it could no longer function independently, with parts of the tribe subsequently integrating within other tribes or confederacies. The initial relocations of the Burbur tribe were "short-distance transhumances into the neighboring Kurdish- and Turkish-speaking territories", followed by the "migrations of many of the western central Zagros tribes, including the Burbur" further southeast in "the parallel geographical configuration of the Zagros range, to Fārs." He added that the migrations of the Burbur tribe must have been made both independently and alongside other tribes, mostly at the time of Shah Abbas I, and that historically the forced and voluntary migrations of the Kurds and Arabs to Khorasan were likely to be the case for the Burbur tribe. By the mid-20th century, some of the Burbur around Varamin were semi-nomadic while others were settled, and they also lived in western Iran, Fars, and Khuzestan, or existed as sub-tribes of confederacies.

With the start of the 16th century, members of the Burbur tribe increasingly held important civil or military positions. Dargahqoli Khan Zolqadr, a descendant of Khandanqoli Khan of the Burbur tribe within the Turkmen chiefs near Mashhad, had emigrated to India in 1638, while his father, also named Khandanqoli, entered the service of the Nizam rulers of Hyderabad. Dargahqoli Khan Zolqadr, also known as Mo'taman-al-Dawla, Mo'taman-al-Molk, Salar Jang, and Khan-e Dawran Nawwab, became one of the leading nobles of Iranian origin at the Hyderabad court and served under four Nizams with distinction. During the reign of Shah Tahmasb I, Ebrahim Agha Burbur was the commander of the Qizilbash troops who fought against the rebellious Alqas Mirza. In 1666, Najafqoli Beg Burbur was mentioned as having been the mir-akhor ("royal marshal, equerry") to Safiqoli Beg, the governor of Kerman, while his brother, Vali Beg, was a senior officer in the Kerman governorate.

According to tradition, Ebrahim Agha Burbur had two sons, Sari Khan and Khazar Khan, and differences between them led to the division of the tribe into two separate parts. Khazar Khan fell on bad terms with Nader Shah which ended in "unfortunate circumstances" for him and his children, and his eldest son, Hoseyn Soltan, was deposed by the members of his estate of Rahgerd sometime between the later tenure of Agha Mohammad Khan Qajar and the earlier tenure of Fath-Ali Shah. Hoseyn Soltan had two infant sons, Ismail and Mohammad, and a daughter at the time of his death. In the mid-18th century, Karim Khan Burbur, an ally of Mohammad Hasan Khan Qajar, competed for power in western Iran against Azad Khan Afghan and Karim Khan Zand. The Zand tribe dwelled between Kamazan and Pari, which was under Burbur control for long periods. Karim Khan Burbur was the same historical figure as Karim Khan Afghan who was mentioned as the commander of the Afghan contingent of the Fars garrison under Nader Shah. Karim Khan Burbur opposed the Zands but eventually submitted to Karim Khan Zand and entered his service as he rose to power.

In the 19th and the 20th century, many of the Burbur tribe held distinguished administrative and military offices in different parts of Iran. Esmail Khan Burbur fought in the Russo-Persian War of 1804-13 and worked his way up to be commander of the personal guards of Abbas Mirza, and later of Mohammad Shah Qajar. After the siege of Herat, he was appointed regional commander of the Kerman province, and when Naser-al-Din Shah came to power, he was further assigned the post of regional commander of the Fars province as well. Hasan Khan Kordkhordi, who was apparently involved in an earlier uprising against the central government, was pleased with his appointment as aide-de-camp to the shah on the specific condition that he denounced anti-government activities. Mehdi Khan Qavam Homayun, also called Ezam-al-Molk Burbur, was a distinguished officer who became the gunnery commander of western Iran, appointed to enforce law and order in the provinces of Lorestan and Hamadan, and also reportedly a Freemason belonging to Majma'-e Adamiyat. His title, Ezam-al-Molk, passed on to his son Gholam-Ali Khan Burbur Mo'tamad-al-Soltan, also a high-ranking officer of the army, and also one of the most prominent local officers of the Anglo-Persian Oil Company from 1930 to 1954, a congressman after 1954, and an ambassador-at-large in international anti-communist conferences, and was highly respected by the Iranian freemasonry as a Past Master at the lodge of Mowlavi and a founder of the Grand Lodge of Iran. Cyrus Burbur was a distinguished physician and professor as well as an MRCP.

Dariush Borbor added that while many of the Burbur tribe were integrated into other confederacies while preserving their ethnonym, there was no exact information either for numbers integrated or for exact dates of incorporation, and the overall numbers within the confederacies were very different. Most of them appeared to have amalgamated into the Amala tribe of the Qashqai confederacy, and others into the Afshar tribe. Smaller numbers had joined the Bakhtiari, or the Baharlu or Jabbara tribes of the Khamseh. The Burbur of Urmia were part of the Afshar, and their association with the Afshars of Urmia appeared in writing in the first half of the 17th century. The Burbur of Kerman were also part of the Afshar, attested in the 16th century. The Baharlu were believed to have came from Syria or Anatolia to Hamadan, which was possibly their point of contact with Burbur. In 1933, the Baharlu tribe of Fars comprised 20 clans, one of which was Burbur. Some of the Burbur joined the Bakhtiari. Some of the Burbur joined the Hadavand Lurs and lived around Garmsar in Semnan and spoke Kurdish. Other Burbur joined the Baharlu or Jabbara tribes, both part of the Khamseh, and some historical sources incorrectly claimed that the Burbur were an offshoot of those tribes. The Burbur among the Qashqai were part of the Amala and Farsimadan tribes. The Amala were said to have been transferred from Lorestan to Fars by Agha Mohammad Khan Qajar. There was also a Burbur clan among the Turkmen tribes of Mashhad attested in the 16th century. Some Burbur were also part of the Shahsevan.
