= Samavak, Hamadan =

Village in Hamadan province, Iran

Samavak Persian: سماوك
- Village
- Location within Iran
- Coordinates: 35°02′30″N 48°52′44″E
- Country: Iran
- Province: Hamadan
- County: Hamadan
- District: Shara
- Rural District: Chah Dasht

Population (2016)
  - Total: 96
- Time zone: UTC+3:30 (IRST)

Samavak (Persian: سماوك) (Note: Also romanized as Samāvak) is a village in Chah Dasht Rural District of Shara District in Hamadan County, Hamadan province, Iran.

== Demographics ==
=== Population ===
At the time of the 2006 National Census, the village's population was 157 in 29 households. The following census in 2011 counted 244 people in 34 households. The 2016 census measured the population of the village as 96 people in 30 households.
