= Qarah Qeshlaq =

Qarah Qeshlaq or Qareh Qeshlaq (Persian: قره قشلاق), also rendered as Qara Qishlaq, may refer to various places in Iran:

- Qarah Qeshlaq, Germi, Ardabil Province
- Qarah Qeshlaq, Kowsar, Ardabil Province
- Qarah Qeshlaq, Qeshlaq, East Azerbaijan Province
- Qarah Qeshlaq, Vargahan, East Azerbaijan Province
- Qareh Qeshlaq, Bonab, East Azerbaijan Province
- Qarah Qeshlaq, Mahabad, West Azerbaijan Province
- Qarah Qeshlaq, Salmas, West Azerbaijan Province
- Qarah Qeshlaq, Zanjan
