= Yekleh =

Village in Hamadan province, Iran

Yekleh Persian: يكله
- Village
- Location within Iran
- Coordinates: 34°52′38″N 49°00′35″E
- Country: Iran
- Province: Hamadan
- County: Hamadan
- District: Shara
- Rural District: Jeyhun Dasht

Population (2016)
  - Total: 918
- Time zone: UTC+3:30 (IRST)

Yekleh (Persian: يكله) is a village in Jeyhun Dasht Rural District of Shara District in Hamadan County, Hamadan province, Iran.

== Demographics ==
=== Population ===
At the time of the 2006 National Census, the village's population was 940 in 203 households. The following census in 2011 counted 944 people in 262 households. The 2016 census measured the population of the village as 918 people in 232 households.
