= Moslemabad, Hamadan =

Village in Hamadan province, Iran

Moslemabad Persian: مسلم اباد
- Village
- Location within Iran
- Coordinates: 34°40′21″N 48°54′42″E
- Country: Iran
- Province: Hamadan
- County: Hamadan
- District: Shara
- Rural District: Shur Dasht

Population (2016)
  - Total: 432
- Time zone: UTC+3:30 (IRST)

Moslemabad (Persian: مسلم اباد) (Note: Also romanized as Moslemābād; also known as Gāv Khāneh) is a village in Shur Dasht Rural District of Shara District in Hamadan County, Hamadan province, Iran.

== Demographics ==
=== Population ===
At the time of the 2006 National Census, the village's population was 601 in 140 households. The following census in 2011 counted 457 people in 131 households. The 2016 census measured the population of the village as 432 people in 133 households.
