= Ab Anbar, Hamadan =

Ab Anbar اب انبار
- Village
- Location within Iran
- Coordinates: 34°35′49″N 49°05′02″E
- Country: Iran
- Province: Hamadan
- County: Hamadan
- Bakhsh: Shara
- Rural District: Shur Dasht

Population (2006)
  - Total: 61
- Time zone: UTC+3:30 (IRST)
  - Summer (DST): UTC+4:30 (IRDT)

Ab Anbar (Persian: اب انبار, also Romanized as Āb Anbār; also known as Āb Ambār) is a village in Shur Dasht Rural District, Shara District, Hamadan County, Hamadan province, Iran. At the 2006 census, its population was 61, in 14 families.
