= Jeyhunabad =

Jeyhunabad (Persian: جيهون اباد or جيحون اباد), also rendered as Jehunabad, may refer to:

- Jeyhunabad, Hamadan (جيهون اباد - Jeyhūnābād)
- Jeyhunabad, Kermanshah (جيحون اباد - Jeyḩūnābād)
