= Ahmadabad, Shara =

Village in Hamadan province, Iran

Ahmadabad Persian: احمداباد
- Village
- Location within Iran
- Coordinates: 34°55′30″N 49°04′36″E
- Country: Iran
- Province: Hamadan
- County: Hamadan
- District: Shara
- Rural District: Jeyhun Dasht

Population (2016)
  - Total: 595
- Time zone: UTC+3:30 (IRST)

Ahmadabad (Persian: احمداباد) (Note: Also romanized as Aḩmadābād; also known as Aḩmadābād-e Chashmeh and Ahmadī) is a village in Jeyhun Dasht Rural District of Shara District in Hamadan County, Hamadan province, Iran.

== Demographics ==
=== Population ===
At the time of the 2006 National Census, the village's population was 786 in 176 households. The following census in 2011 counted 725 people in 198 households. The 2016 census measured the population of the village as 595 people in 154 households.
