= Boyukabad =

Village in Hamadan province, Iran

Boyukabad Persian: بيوك اباد
- Village
- Location within Iran
- Coordinates: 35°03′35″N 48°50′30″E
- Country: Iran
- Province: Hamadan
- County: Hamadan
- District: Shara
- Rural District: Chah Dasht

Population (2016)
  - Total: 1,027
- Time zone: UTC+3:30 (IRST)

Boyukabad (Persian: بيوك اباد) (Note: Also romanized as Boyūkābād; also known as Bābūkābād, Būbūkābād, and Būyūkābād) is a village in, and the capital of, Chah Dasht Rural District in Shara District of Hamadan County, Hamadan province, Iran.

== Demographics ==
=== Language ===
The village is Azeri Turkic-speaking.

=== Population ===
At the time of the 2006 National Census, the village's population was 1,408 in 326 households. The following census in 2011 counted 1,305 people in 394 households. The 2016 census measured the population of the village as 1,027 people in 319 households.

== Notable people ==
- Ahmad Sabiri Hamedani, Shia Cleric
