= Abdol Rahim =

Village in Hamadan province, Iran

Abdol Rahim Persian: عبدالرحيم
- Village
- Location within Iran
- Coordinates: 34°37′35″N 49°01′03″E
- Country: Iran
- Province: Hamadan
- County: Hamadan
- District: Shara
- Rural District: Shur Dasht

Population (2016)
  - Total: 1,738
- Time zone: UTC+3:30 (IRST)

Abdol Rahim (Persian: عبدالرحيم) (Note: Also romanized as Abdol Rahīm; also known as ‘Abd or Raḩīm, ‘Abdul Rahīm, and Deh-e ‘Abd or Raḩīm) is a village in Shur Dasht Rural District of Shara District in Hamadan County, Hamadan province, Iran.

== Demographics ==
=== Population ===
At the time of the 2006 National Census, the village's population was 2,156 in 534 households. The following census in 2011 counted 2,265 people in 622 households. The 2016 census measured the population of the village as 1,738 people in 536 households.
