= Bozineh Jerd =

Village in Hamadan province, Iran

Bozineh Jerd Persian: بزينه جرد
- Village
- Location within Iran
- Coordinates: 35°01′29″N 48°56′38″E
- Country: Iran
- Province: Hamadan
- County: Hamadan
- District: Shara
- Rural District: Chah Dasht

Population (2016)
  - Total: 33
- Time zone: UTC+3:30 (IRST)

Bozineh Jerd (Persian: بزينه جرد) (Note: Also romanized as Bizīneh-i-Jird and Bozīneh Jerd; also known as Bezanjerd, Bezenjerd, Bīznajerd, and Bozan Jerd) is a village in Chah Dasht Rural District of Shara District in Hamadan County, Hamadan province, Iran.

== Demographics ==
=== Population ===
At the time of the 2006 National Census, the village's population was 56 in 13 households. The following census in 2011 counted 45 people in 11 households. The 2016 census measured the population of the village as 33 people in 11 households.
