= Rahjerd, Hamadan =

Village in Hamadan province, Iran

Rahjerd Persian: راهجرد
- Village
- Location within Iran
- Coordinates: 34°36′23″N 49°06′28″E
- Country: Iran
- Province: Hamadan
- County: Hamadan
- District: Shara
- Rural District: Shur Dasht

Population (2016)
  - Total: 192
- Time zone: UTC+3:30 (IRST)

Rahjerd (Persian: راهجرد) (Note: Also romanized as Rāhjerd; also known as Rājerd and Rājird) is a village in Shur Dasht Rural District of Shara District in Hamadan County, Hamadan province, Iran.

== Demographics ==
=== Population ===
At the time of the 2006 National Census, the village's population was 512 in 102 households. The following census in 2011 counted 255 people in 64 households. The 2016 census measured the population of the village as 192 people in 46 households.
