= Jeyhunabad, Hamadan =

Village in Hamadan province, Iran

Jeyhunabad Persian: جيهون اباد
- Village
- Location within Iran
- Coordinates: 34°58′05″N 48°59′30″E
- Country: Iran
- Province: Hamadan
- County: Hamadan
- District: Shara
- Rural District: Jeyhun Dasht

Population (2016)
  - Total: 569
- Time zone: UTC+3:30 (IRST)

Jeyhunabad (Persian: جيهون اباد) (Note: Also romanized as Jeyḩūnābād; also known as Jehūnābād) is a village in Jeyhun Dasht Rural District of Shara District in Hamadan County, Hamadan province, Iran.

== Demographics ==
=== Population ===
At the time of the 2006 National Census, the village's population was 1,077 in 264 households. The following census in 2011 counted 782 people in 209 households. The 2016 census measured the population of the village as 569 people in 183 households.
