= Chah Dasht Rural District =

Rural district in Hamadan province, Iran

Chah Dasht Rural District Persian: دهستان چاه دشت
- Rural District
- Location within Iran
- Coordinates: 35°00′N 48°51′E
- Country: Iran
- Province: Hamadan
- County: Hamadan
- District: Shara
- Established: 1987
- Capital: Boyukabad

Population (2016)
  - Total: 4,407
- Time zone: UTC+3:30 (IRST)

Chah Dasht Rural District (Persian: دهستان چاه دشت) is in Shara District of Hamadan County, Hamadan province, Iran. Its capital is the village of Boyukabad.

== Demographics ==
=== Population ===
At the time of the 2006 National Census, the rural district's population was 6,708 in 5,411 households. There were 5,411 inhabitants in 1,501 households at the following census of 2011. The 2016 census measured the population of the rural district as 4,407 in 1,301 households. The most populous of its 11 villages was Qerkhlar, with 1,568 people.

=== Other villages in the rural district ===
- Bozineh Jerd
- Hajji Maqsud
- Idahlu
- Milajerd
- Now Deh
- Qepchaq
- Samavak
- Yeserlu
