= Qahavand =

City in Hamadan province, Iran

Qahavand Persian: قهاوند
- City
- Location within Iran
- Coordinates: 34°51′32″N 49°00′15″E
- Country: Iran
- Province: Hamadan
- County: Hamadan
- District: Shara
- Established: 1997

Population (2016)
  - Total: 2,970
- Time zone: UTC+3:30 (IRST)

Qahavand (Persian: قهاوند) (Note: Also romanized as Qahāvand and Qahāwand) is a city in, and the capital of, Shara District in Hamadan County, Hamadan province, Iran. It also serves as the administrative center for Jeyhun Dasht Rural District. The village of Qahavand was converted to a city in 1997.

== Demographics ==
=== Population ===
At the time of the 2006 National Census, the city's population was 2,407 in 616 households. The following census in 2011 counted 3,115 people in 763 households. The 2016 census measured the population of the city as 2,970 people in 845 households.
