= Varkesh, Hamadan =

Varkesh وركش
- Village
- Location within Iran
- Coordinates: 34°38′47″N 49°03′28″E
- Country: Iran
- Province: Hamadan
- County: Hamadan
- Bakhsh: Shara
- Rural District: Shur Dasht

Population (2006)
  - Total: 62
- Time zone: UTC+3:30 (IRST)
  - Summer (DST): UTC+4:30 (IRDT)

Varkesh (Persian: وركش; also known as Bārkesh and Bārkīsh) is a village in Shur Dasht Rural District, Shara District, Hamadan County, Hamadan Province, Iran. At the 2006 census, its population was 62, in 16 families.
