= Qeshlaq-e Olya, Hamadan =

Qeshlaq-e Olya قشلاق عليا
- Village
- Location within Iran
- Coordinates: 34°41′33″N 49°04′05″E
- Country: Iran
- Province: Hamadan
- County: Hamadan
- Bakhsh: Shara
- Rural District: Shur Dasht

Population (2006)
  - Total: 176
- Time zone: UTC+3:30 (IRST)
  - Summer (DST): UTC+4:30 (IRDT)

Qeshlaq-e Olya (Persian: قشلاق عليا, also Romanized as Qeshlāq-e ‘Olyā; also known as Qeshlāq-e Ḩājjī Ramaẕānī and Qeshlāq-e Ḩājj Ramaẕānī) is a village in Shur Dasht Rural District, Shara District, Hamadan County, Hamadan Province, Iran. At the 2006 census, its population was 176, in 37 families.
