= Khomajin, Shara =

Village in Hamadan province, Iran

Khomajin Persian: خماجين
- Village
- Location within Iran
- Coordinates: 34°41′51″N 49°02′09″E
- Country: Iran
- Province: Hamadan
- County: Hamadan
- District: Shara
- Rural District: Shur Dasht

Population (2016)
  - Total: 257
- Time zone: UTC+3:30 (IRST)

Khomajin (Persian: خماجين) (Note: Also romanized as Khomājīn; also known as Khūmājin and Khvomeyn) is a village in Shur Dasht Rural District of Shara District in Hamadan County, Hamadan province, Iran.

== Demographics ==
=== Population ===
At the time of the 2006 National Census, the village's population was 340 in 70 households. The following census in 2011 counted 278 people in 63 households. The 2016 census measured the population of the village as 257 people in 70 households.
