= Milajerd, Hamadan =

Village in Hamadan province, Iran

Milajerd Persian: ميلاجرد
- Village
- Location within Iran
- Coordinates: 35°02′22″N 48°54′09″E
- Country: Iran
- Province: Hamadan
- County: Hamadan
- District: Shara
- Rural District: Chah Dasht

Population (2016)
  - Total: 287
- Time zone: UTC+3:30 (IRST)

Milajerd (Persian: ميلاجرد) (Note: Also romanized as Mīlājerd; also known as Mīl-ī-Jīrd) is a village in Chah Dasht Rural District of Shara District in Hamadan County, Hamadan province, Iran.

== Demographics ==
=== Population ===
At the time of the 2006 National Census, the village's population was 493 in 109 households. The following census in 2011 counted 402 people in 114 households. The 2016 census measured the population of the village as 287 people in 97 households.
