= Dashteh, Hamadan =

Village in Hamadan province, Iran

Dashteh Persian: دشته
- Village
- Location within Iran
- Coordinates: 34°49′34″N 49°01′32″E
- Country: Iran
- Province: Hamadan
- County: Hamadan
- District: Shara
- Rural District: Jeyhun Dasht

Population (2016)
  - Total: 1,412
- Time zone: UTC+3:30 (IRST)

Dashteh (Persian: دشته) (Note: Also known as Dashta) is a village in Jeyhun Dasht Rural District of Shara District in Hamadan County, Hamadan province, Iran.

== Demographics ==
=== Population ===
At the time of the 2006 National Census, the village's population was 1,456 in 317 households. The following census in 2011 counted 1,478 people in 395 households. The 2016 census measured the population of the village as 1,412 people in 413 households, the most populous in its rural district.
