= Dariush Borbor =

Iranian-French architect and urban planner

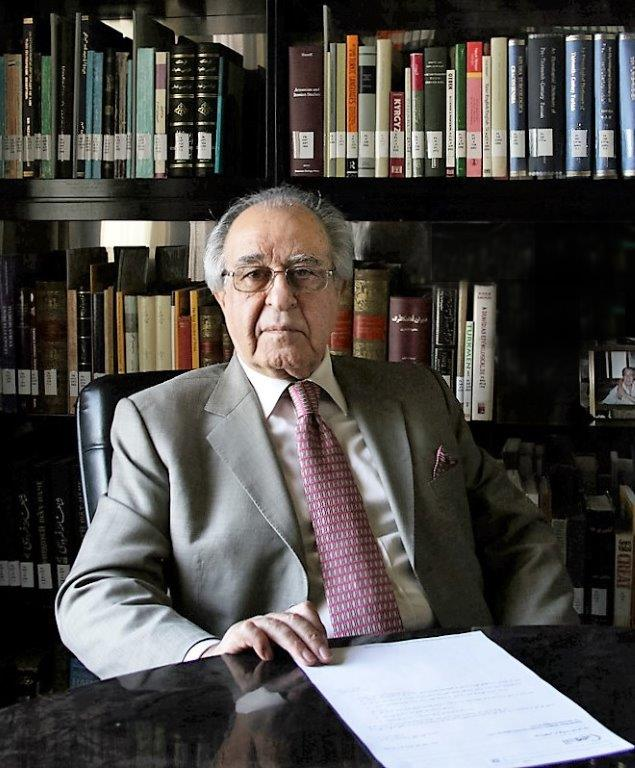
- Dariush Borbor
- Born: April 28, 1934 (age 92); Tehran, Iran
- Education: University of Liverpool; University of Geneva
- Occupation: Architect
- Awards: Gold Mercury International Award (1976); Royal Pahlavi Prize (1977); 50 Outstanding Architects of the World (1988); Knight of the Order of Arts and Letters / Chevalier de l'Ordre des Arts et des Lettres (2020)
- Buildings: Urban Renewal of Mashhad City Centre (1968); Commercial Centre Bazaar Reza (1976); Museum and Library (1976)

Dariush Borbor (Persian: داریوش بوربور, born April 28, 1934), is an Iranian-French architect, urban planner, designer, sculptor, painter, researcher, and writer. In 1963, Borbor established his own firm under the name of Borbor Consulting Architects, Engineers, City Planners. In 1976, he set up Sphere Iran, a consortium of four specialist consulting firms, and proposed a comprehensive national environmental master plan for Iran. In 1992, he created the Research Institute and Library of Iranian Studies (RILIS) where he is the director.

Borbor is a respected contributor to modern architecture and Iranian studies. He has been described as one of the avant-garde architects of the modern movement, a pioneer of modern urban planning in Iran, named by some as "father of modern urban planning", and a key figure in the promotion and creation of the High Urban Planning Council (1966, Persian: شورای عالی شهرسازی). He was described by Swiss architectural critic Anthony Krafft as "one of the most innovative architects who is perhaps on the way of creating a Persian architectural style of the 20th century". French architectural critic Michel Ragon defined him as "the architect in search of a modern Iranian architectural style". He has won many competitions and received several international prizes and awards, including the Gold Mercury International from Italy, 50 Outstanding Architects of the World from the Second Belgrade Triennial of World Architecture, and the Pahlavi Royal Award.

== Early life ==
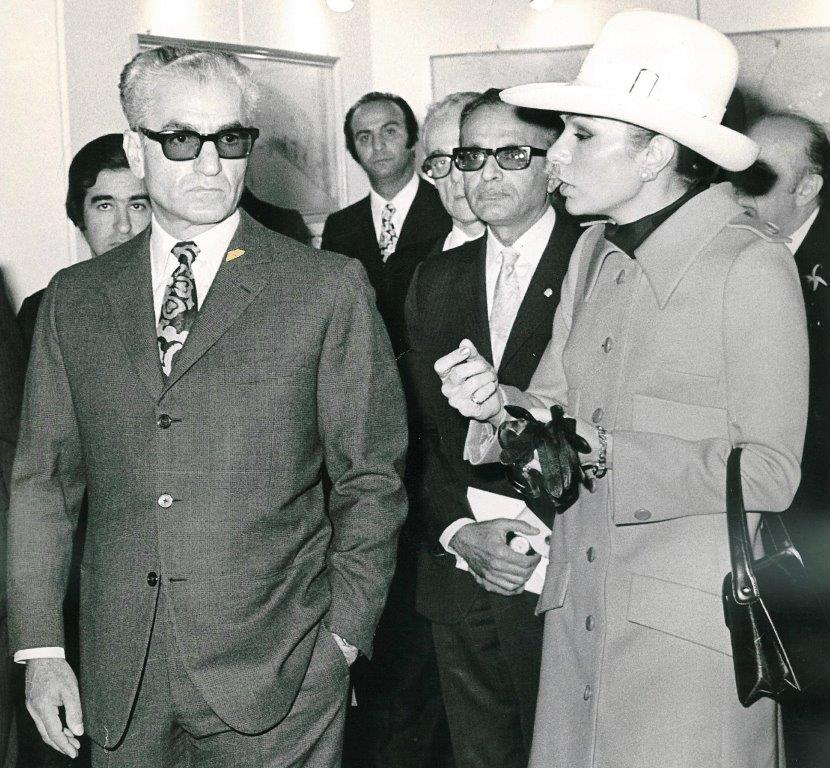
Tehran 1966, Shah of Iran and Queen Farah visit the High Urban Planning Council; present are Hoveyda (Prime Minister), Badi (HUPC Director), Ziya'i (Senator), Iranpour, Borbor (Urban Planning Consultant)

Dariush Borbor was born in April 1934. His father was Gholam Hossein khan Borbor (Persian: غلامحسین خان بوربور), one of the directors of the Iranian branch of the former Anglo-Iranian Oil Company (AIOC), congressman, ambassador-at-large, and one of the founding members of the Grand Lodge of Iran. His family belonged to the Borbor tribe, a tribe scattered across Iran, which was largely unknown until he later brought attention to the tribe and gave much information. Borbor had his primary schooling in Iran. At the age of thirteen, he moved to the United Kingdom for his secondary education, after which he obtained his General Certificate of Education from University of Cambridge (1952), a Bachelor of Architecture (1958) and a Master of Civic Design (1959) both from the University of Liverpool. He then went to specialize in the architecture of hot dry regions at the University of Geneva (1961) under the direction of the French architect and urban planner Eugène Beaudouin.

== Career ==
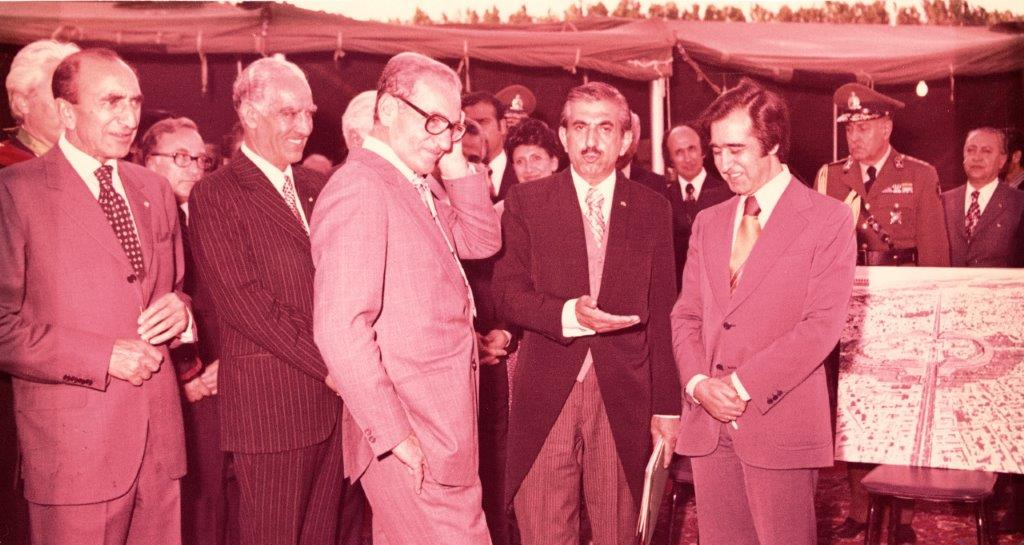
Mashhad 1974, Presentation of the Urban Renewal of Mashhad City Centre to the Shah by Dariush Borbor, Architect-Planner

While working for his PhD, he collaborated concurrently with the Swiss urban planner Professor Arnold Hoechel and the architects Frei Hunziker, Architectes Associés on several projects, including the first automatic bowling alleys in Meyrin Commune, Geneva, and Beirut, Lebanon.

In 1961, he returned to Tehran as Deputy Technical Director of Iran-Rah, the largest Construction Co. of its time in Iran. In 1963, he created his own firm under the name of Borbor Consulting Architects, Engineers, City Planners. As President and managing director, he developed and expanded the business to a large multidisciplinary organization with several in-house departments which included: architecture, urban planning, environment, structure, mechanics, electricity and interior design. The firm employed a large number of highly qualified multi-national staff and included branch offices in several major cities in Iran.

A few months prior to the 1978 Iranian Islamic Revolution, Borbor moved to Paris, France where he founded the Borbor International Management Consultants (BIMC) to Architects, Engineers, Planners. BIMC offered consultancy services in design, management and documentation to architectural and planning firms. In 1984, he moved to Los Angeles where he was involved in some architectural consultancy and research on Iranian and Persianate subjects.

Borbor returned to Iran in 1991 and established the Research Institute and Library of Iranian Studies (RILIS), a non-profit, non-political, private and independent institution dedicated to the promotion of research in the field of Iranian and Persianate studies with special emphasis on novel and creative research. He is a Consultant and active contributor to the Encyclopædia Iranica.

== Prizes and awards ==
- 1958, Working Drawing Award, Architects' Journal, London, UK
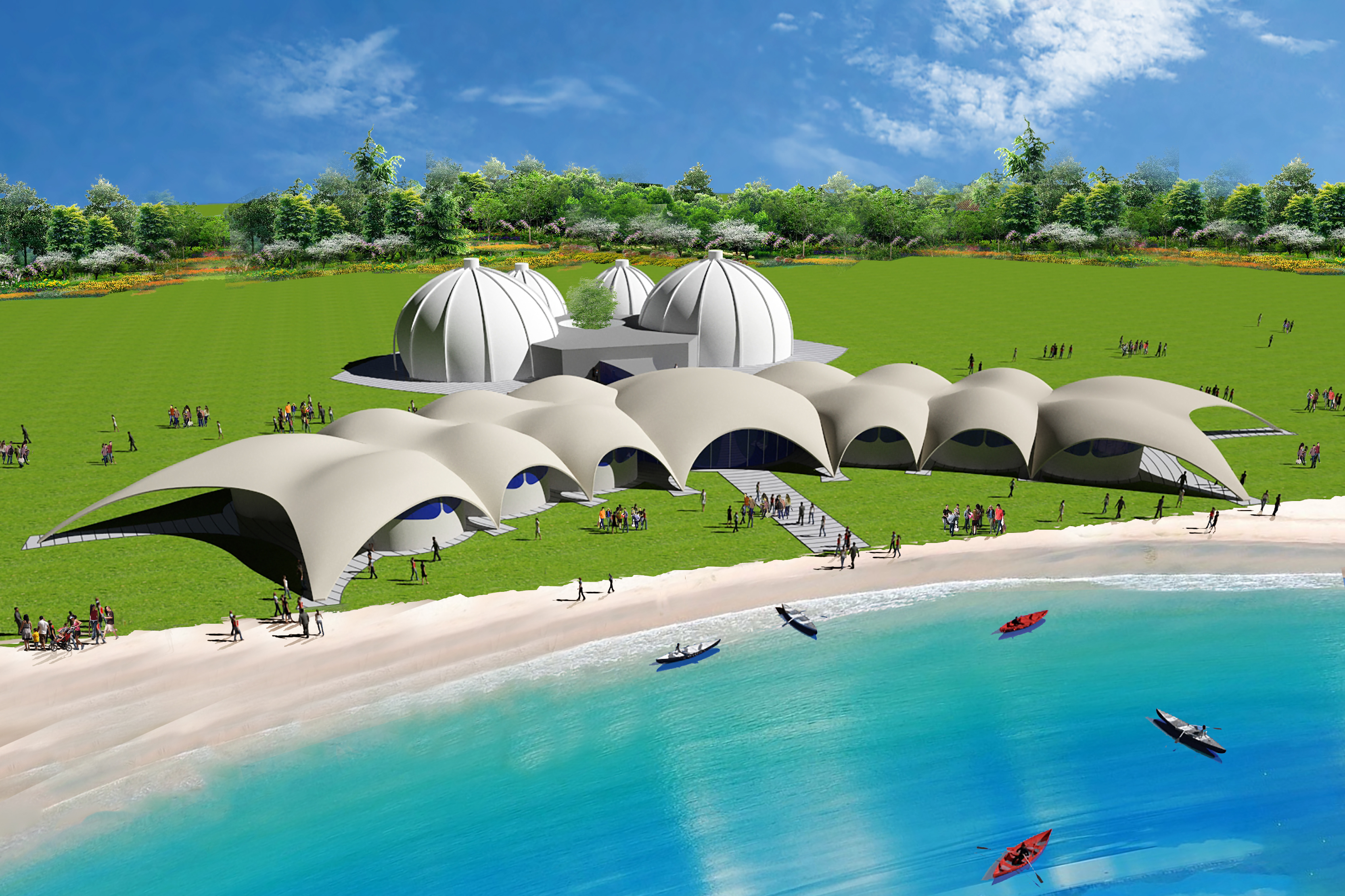
- Persian Pavilion Persian Bath House, Los Angeles, 1964
  1959, First Prize, ideas competition for a Liverpool neighbourhood, Department of Civic Design, University of Liverpool, UK
- 1965, First Prize, design of Persian Pavilion, Los Angeles
- 1975, Gold Mercury International Award for project management, Rome, Italy
- 1976, NIOC Award, seaside resort, Mahmoudabad, Caspian coast, Iran
- 1976, First Prize, 2200-unit shopping mall (Bazaar Reza, Persian: بازار رضا) in Mashhad, Iran
- 1976, First Prize, monument, Mashhad, Iran.
- 1977, First Prize, Temple of the Grand Lodge of Iran, Tehran, Iran.
- 1978, Pahlavi Royal Award, for design, construction and management, 2200-unit shopping mall (Bazaar Reza) in record eleven months
- 1988, 50 Outstanding Architects of the World, the Second Belgrade Triennial of World Architecture
- 2020, Knight of the Order of Arts and Letters (Chevalier de l'Ordre des Arts et des Lettres)
- 2022, Dariush Borbor ranked as one of the most influential academic alumni of the University of Liverpool.
- 2023, University of Liverpool 2023 Alumni Award.

== Selected projects and writings ==
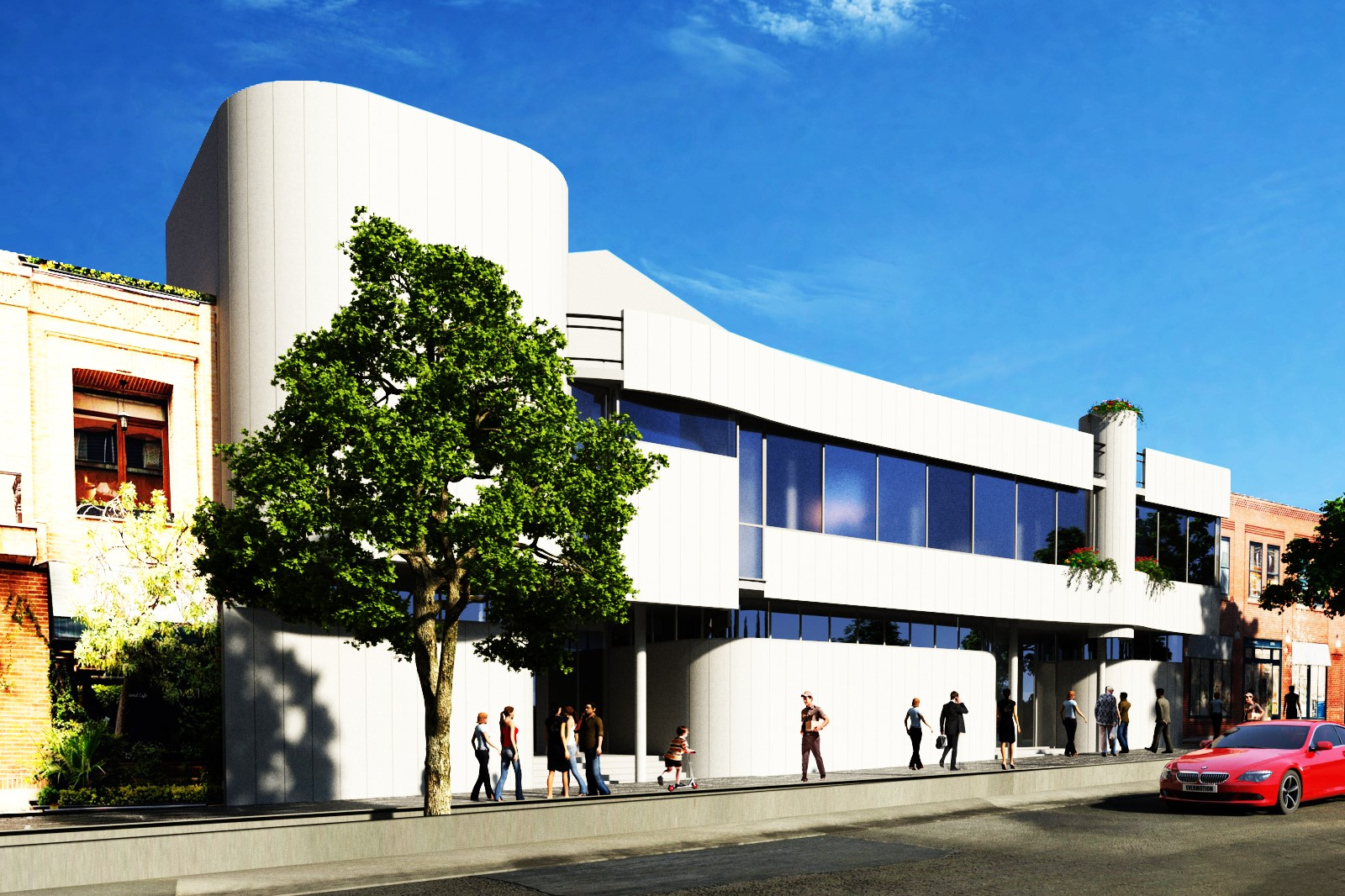
Ice Palace, Sports and Social Centre, Tehran, 1967

=== Architecture ===
- 1967, The Ice Palace recreation centre, Pahlavi Avenue, Tehran
- 1971, Monument Mashhad (demolished in 2010)
- 1976, Museum and library, Mashhad, Iran

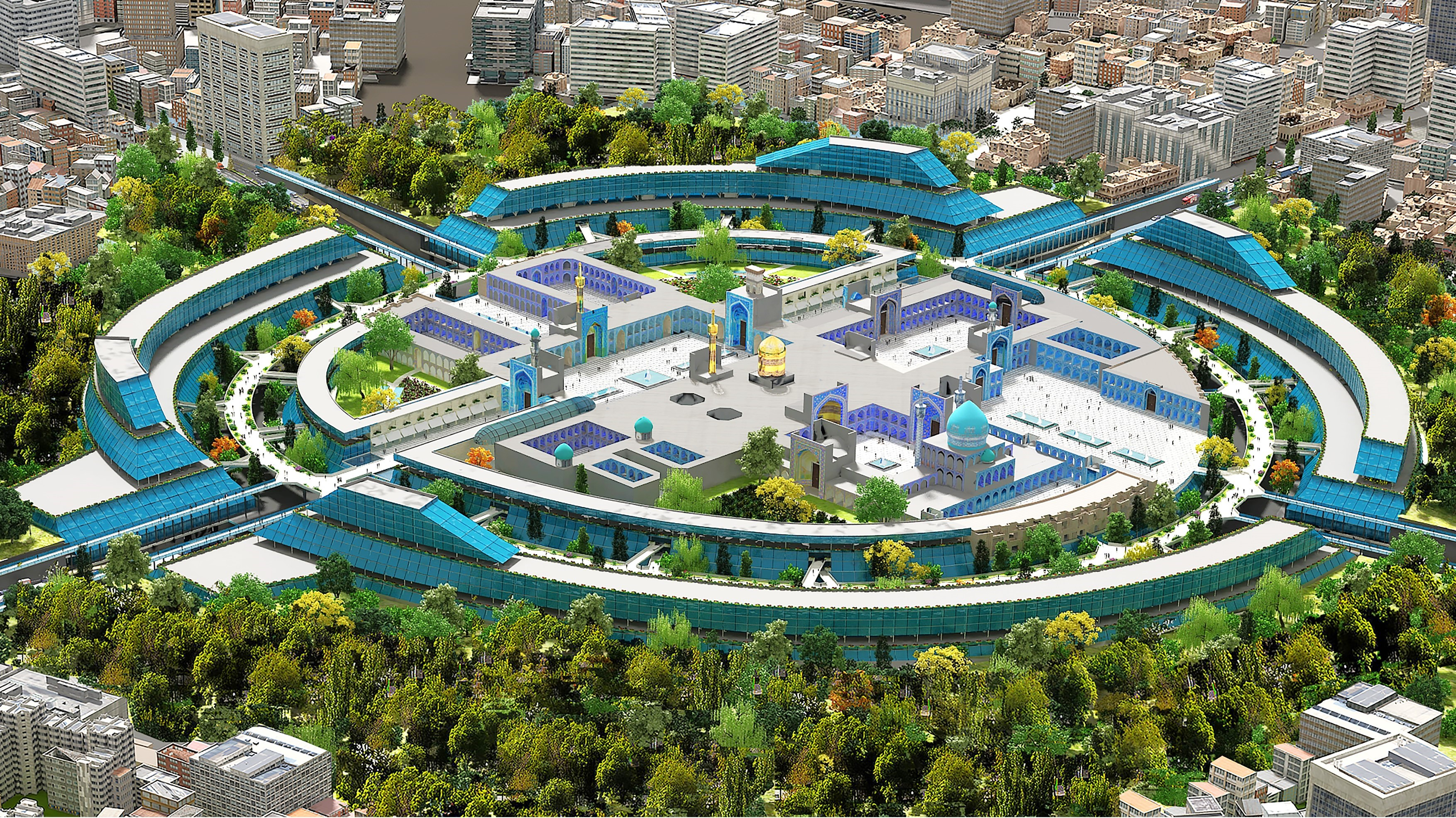
Mashhad City Centre Urban Renewal, Mashhad, 2025

=== Regional planning ===
- 1963–1966, Nowshahr-Chalus Regional Plan
- 1964–1965, Caspian Coast Regional Plan
- 1969–1973, Abadan-Khoramshahr Regional Plan

=== Urban and landscape design ===
- 1968, Project for the urban renewal of Mashhad City Centre
- 1968, Kakhk post-earthquake reconstruction
- 1976, Bazaar Reza shopping mall, Mashhad

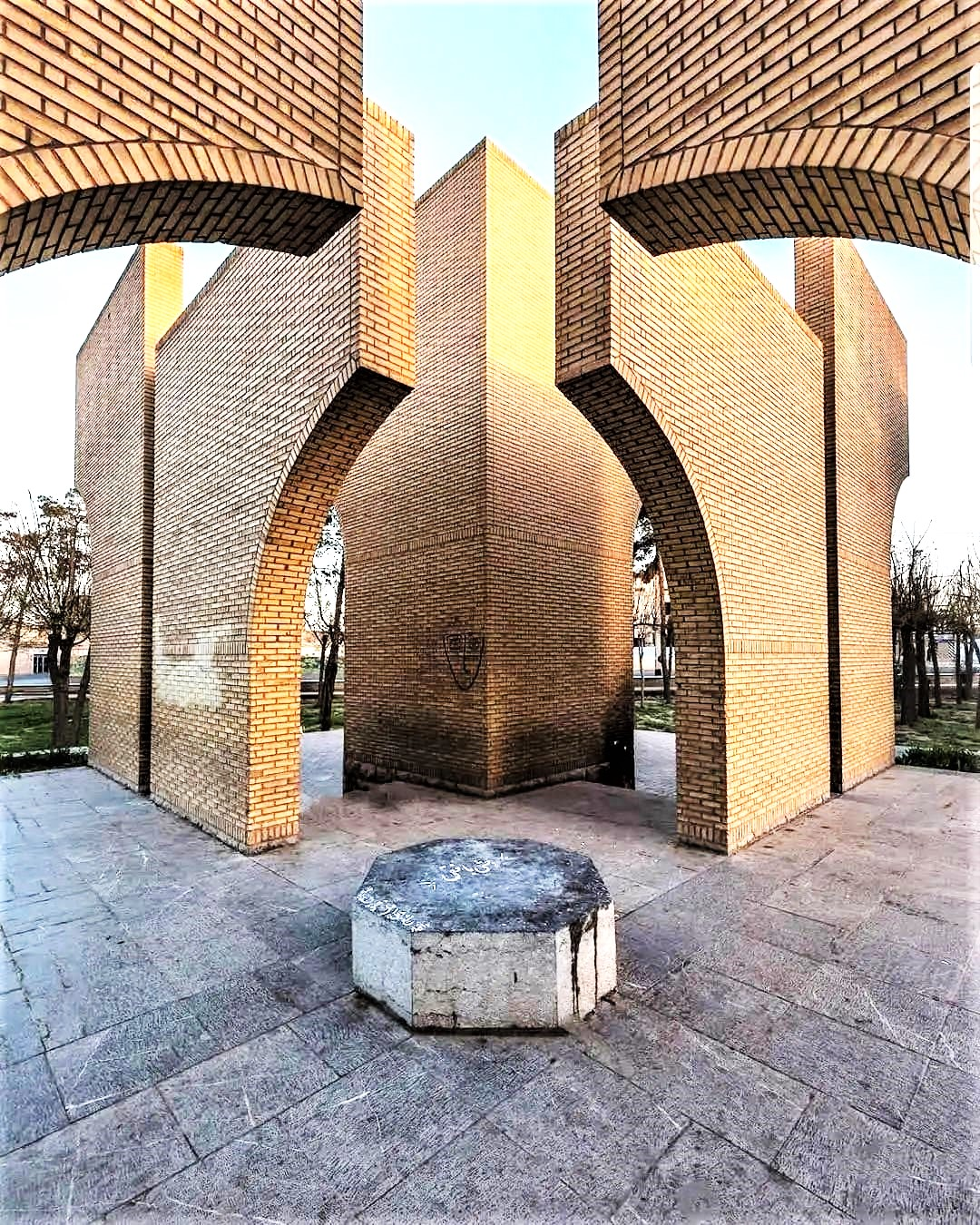
Monument, Vahshi Bafghi, Yazd, 1977

=== Bibliography ===
- Dariush Borbor, Majlis: Teheran, Iran, University of Liverpool, Google Books, Liverpool, 1958.
- "The Influence of Persian Gardens on Islamic Decoration", Architecture Formes Fonctions, vol. 14, ed. Anthony Krafft, Lausanne, Switzerland, 1968, pp. 84–91.
- D.Bourbour [Borbor], Projet de Rénovation de Haram Hazrat-e-Reza à Meched, A.A. Honar va Me'mari, Tehran, 1972.
- "Iran", The Encyclopedia of Urban Planning, McGraw-Hill, New York, 1974, pp. 553–567.
- "The Influence of Wine Culture in Iranian Architecture and the Region", Wine Culture in Iran and Beyond, Österreichischen Akademie der Wissenchaften (ÖAW) / Austrian Academy of Sciences, Vienna, 2014, pp. 259–275.
- Dariush Borbor, Dariush Borbor Compendium of Articles, Presentations and Interviews 1954-2018, Sahab Geographic & Drafting Institute, Tehran, 2018.
- Dariush Borbor, Analytical Comparative Etymological Dictionary of Reduplication in the Major Languages of the Middle East and Iran, Oxford, 2023.

== Gallery ==
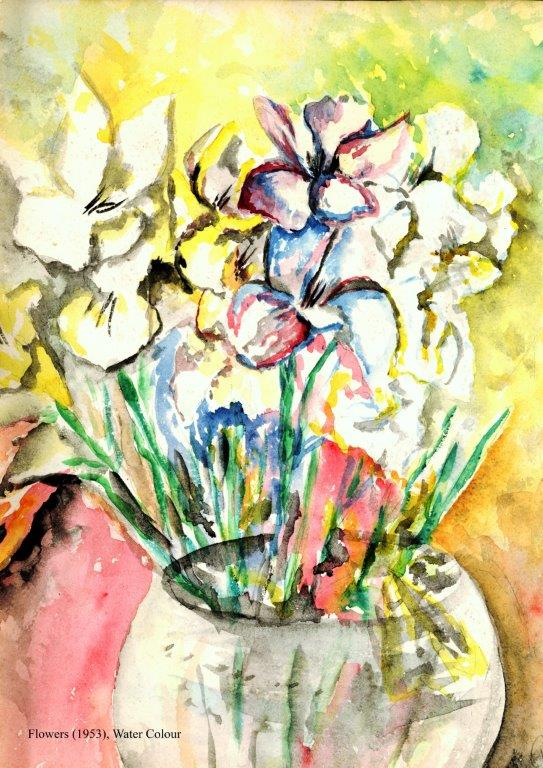
1953, "Flowers", Aquarelle (30 x 22 cm.) by Dariush Borbor

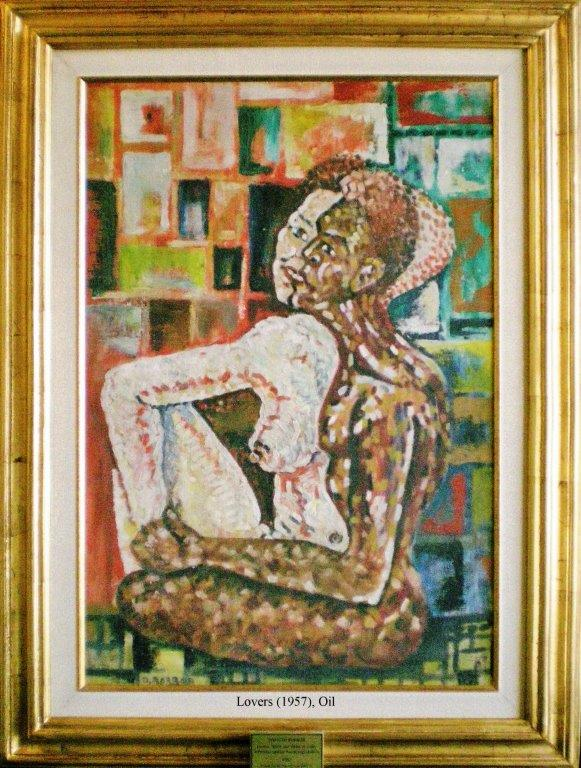
1957, "Lovers, Black and White in Unity" oil on canvas (60 cm. x 46 cm.) by Dariush Borbor, presented to Nelson Mandela in 2007 by the artist on the 50th anniversary of the painting

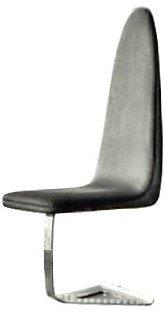
Chair, Tehran, Iran, 1961

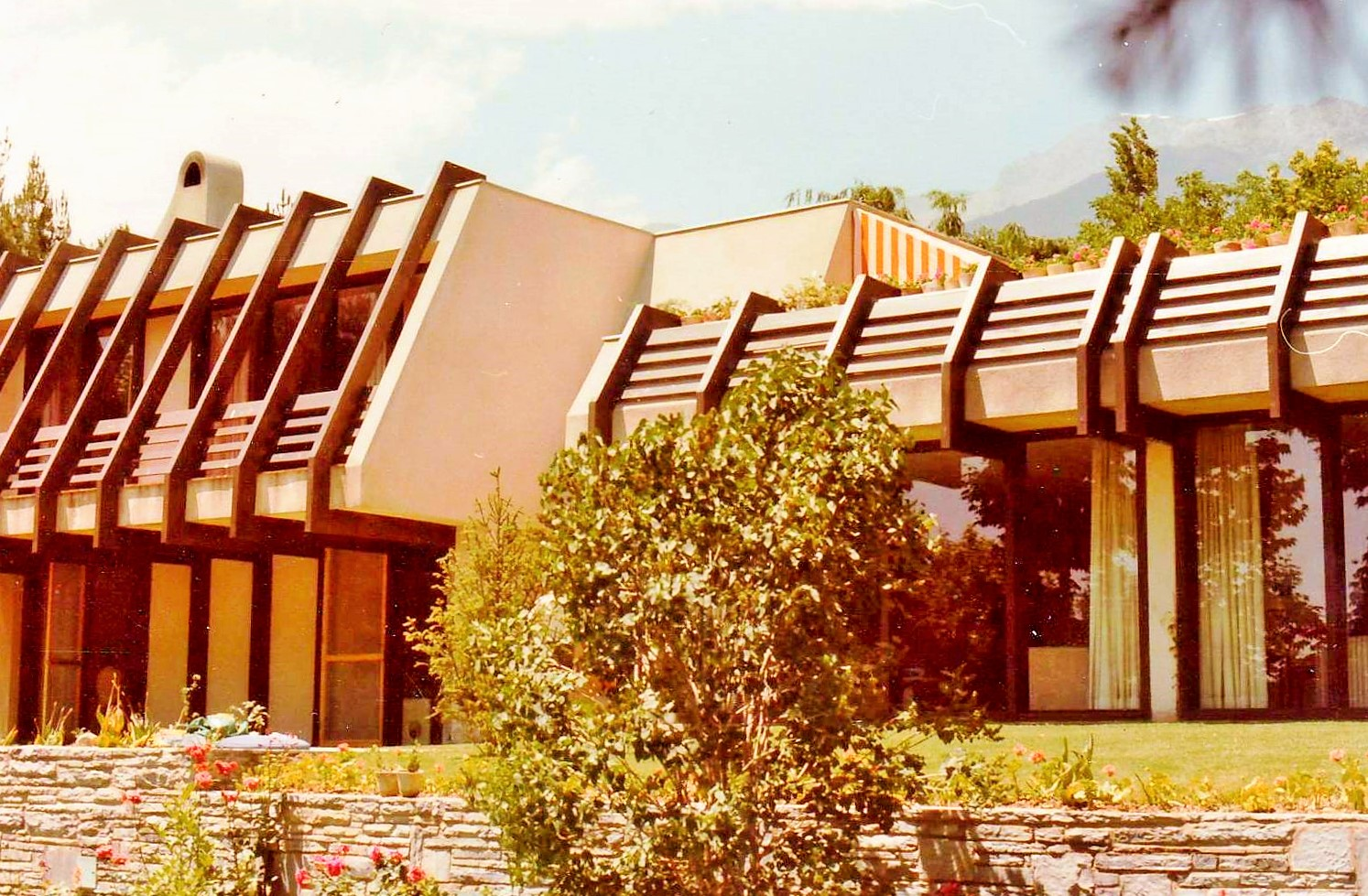
House Extension, Mousavizadeh, South View, Tehran, 1974

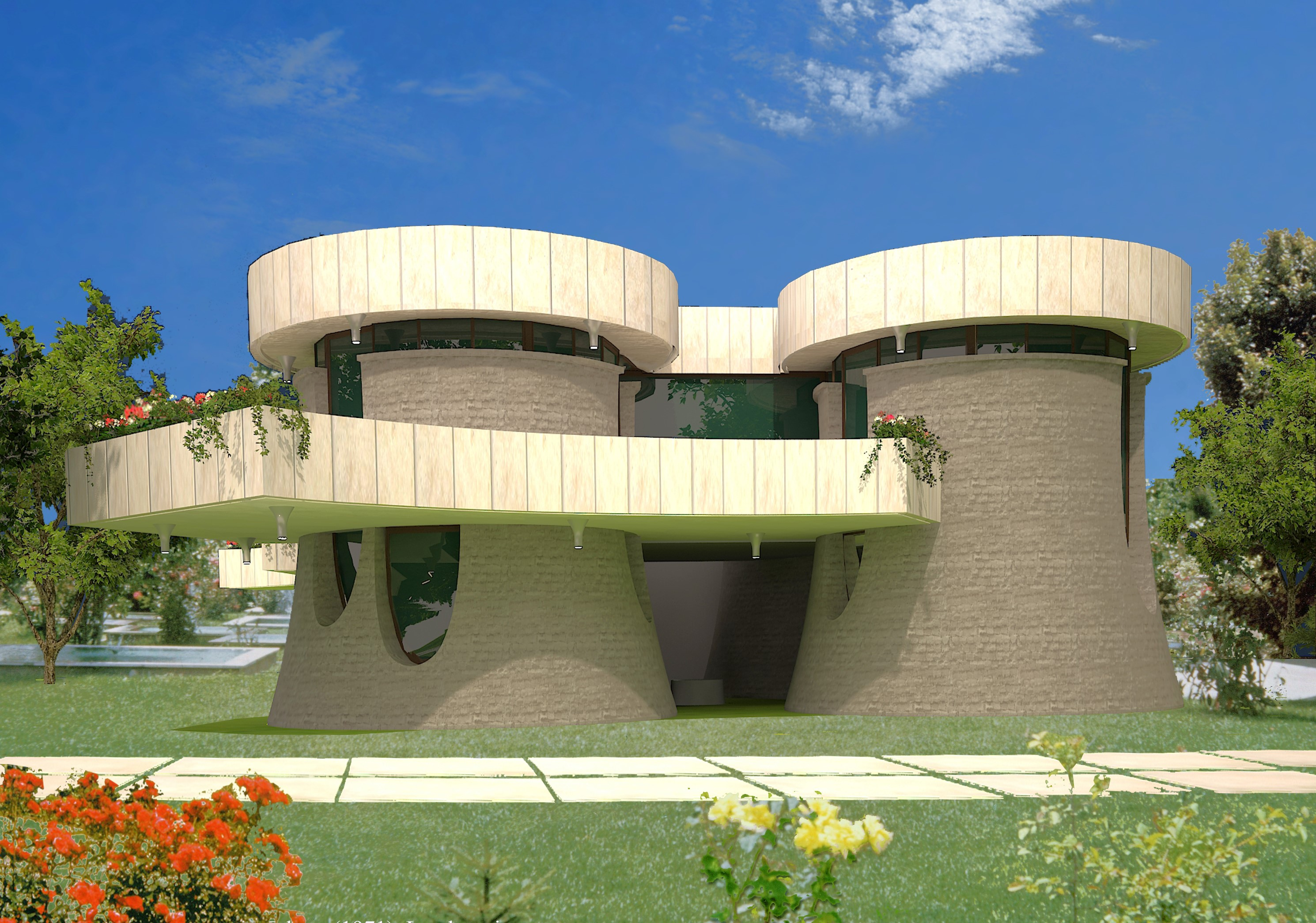
House Nahavandi, North View, Tehran, 1965

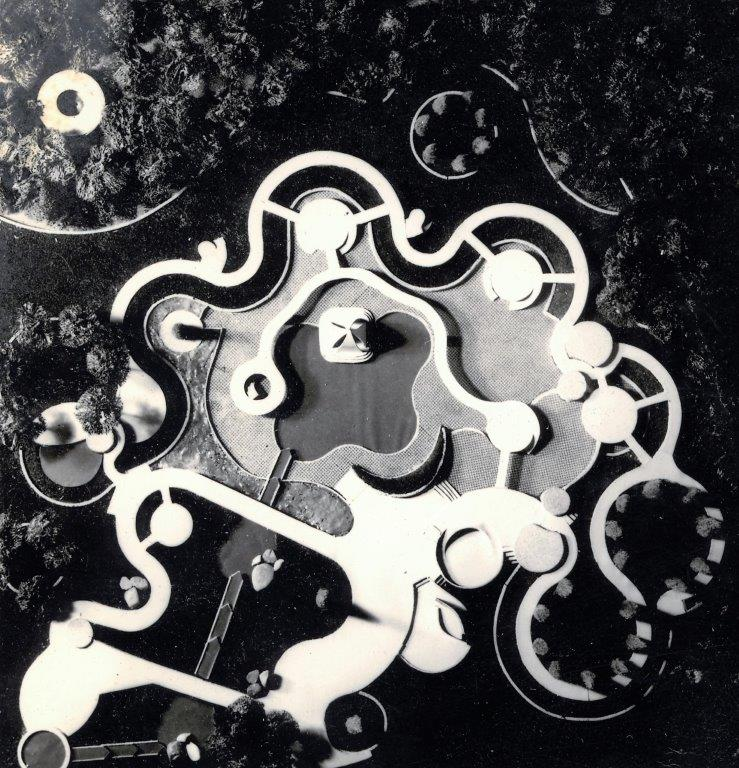
Landscape, Park Ahwaz, 1966

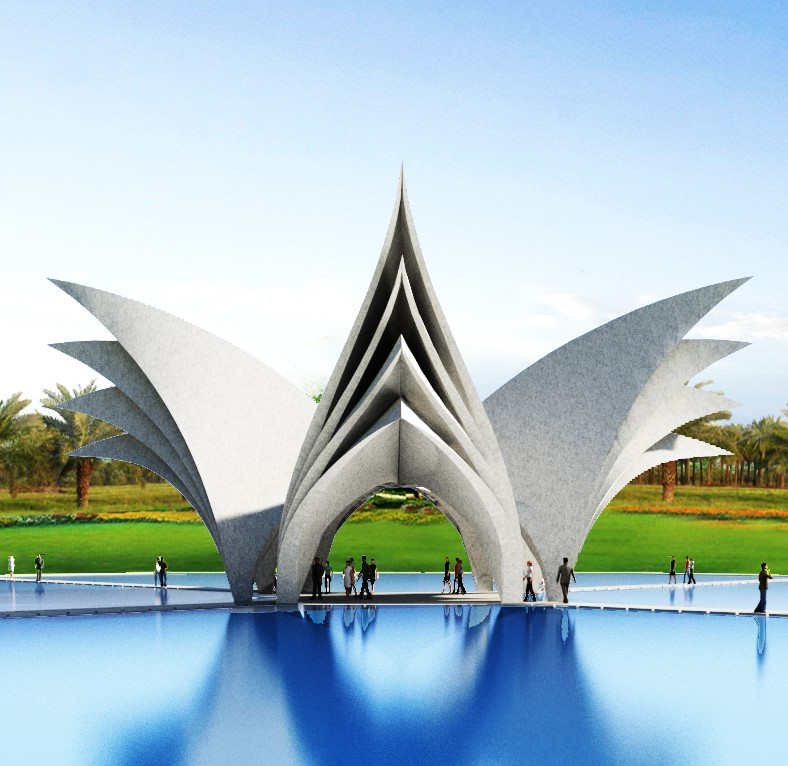
Monument, Abadan, Iran 1971

== See also ==
- Culture of Iran
- Islamic art
- Iranian art
- Islamic calligraphy
- List of Iranian artists
