= Qeshlaq-e Pust Shuran =

Qeshlaq-e Pust Shuran قشلاق پوست شوران
- Village
- Location within Iran
- Coordinates: 34°24′11″N 48°12′59″E
- Country: Iran
- Province: Hamadan
- County: Tuyserkan
- Bakhsh: Qolqol Rud
- Rural District: Miyan Rud

Population (2006)
  - Total: 210
- Time zone: UTC+3:30 (IRST)
  - Summer (DST): UTC+4:30 (IRDT)

Qeshlaq-e Pust Shuran (Persian: قشلاق پوست شوران, also Romanized as Qeshlāq-e Pūst Shūrān; also known as Qeshlāq and Qeshlāq-e Pūsteh Shūrān) is a village in Miyan Rud Rural District, Qolqol Rud District, Tuyserkan County, Hamadan Province, Iran. At the 2006 census, its population was 210, in 44 families.
