= Qeshlaq-e Sardar Eshraf =

Qeshlaq-e Sardar Eshraf قشلاق سرداراشرف
- Village
- Location within Iran
- Coordinates: 34°51′21″N 47°11′02″E
- Country: Iran
- Province: Kermanshah
- County: Sonqor
- Bakhsh: Kolyai
- Rural District: Kivanat

Population (2006)
  - Total: 86
- Time zone: UTC+3:30 (IRST)
  - Summer (DST): UTC+4:30 (IRDT)

Qeshlaq-e Sardar Eshraf (Persian: قشلاق سرداراشرف, also Romanized as Qeshlāq-e Sardār Eshraf; also known as Qeshlāq) is a village in Kivanat Rural District, Kolyai District, Sonqor County, Kermanshah Province, Iran. At the 2006 census, its population was 86, in 23 families.
