= Qeshlaq Khas =

- Location in Afghanistan
- Coordinates: 35°8′6″N 64°30′39″E
- Country: Afghanistan
- Province: Badghis Province
- Time zone: + 4.30

Qeshlaq Khas is a village in Badghis Province in north western Afghanistan.
