= Dashteh, West Azerbaijan =

Coordinates: 34°49′35″N 49°01′31″E

Dashteh دشته
- Village
- Interactive map of Dashteh
- Country: Iran
- Province: West Azerbaijan
- County: Sardasht
- Bakhsh: Central
- Rural District: Bask-e Kuleseh

Population (2006)
  - Total: 37
- Time zone: UTC+3:30 (IRST)
  - Summer (DST): UTC+4:30 (IRDT)

Dashteh (Persian: دشته) is a village in Bask-e Kuleseh Rural District, in the Central District of Sardasht County, West Azerbaijan Province, Iran. At the 2006 census, its population was 37, in 8 families.
