= Bala Dashteh =

Village in Ilam, Iran

Bala Dashteh بالادشته
- Village
- Location within Iran
- Coordinates: 33°48′26″N 47°02′34″E
- Country: Iran
- Province: Ilam
- County: Chardavol
- Bakhsh: Helilan
- Rural District: Helilan

Population (2006)
  - Total: 25
- Time zone: UTC+3:30 (IRST)
  - Summer (DST): UTC+4:30 (IRDT)

Bala Dashteh (Persian: بالادشته, also Romanized as Bālā Dashteh; also known as Vālā Dasht and Valā Dasht) is a village in Helilan Rural District, Helilan District, Chardavol County, Ilam Province, Iran. At the 2006 census, its population was 25, in 7 families. The village is populated by Kurds.
