= Qeshlaq Baba Rostam =

Qeshlaq Baba Rostam قشلاق بابارستم
- Village
- Location within Iran
- Coordinates: 34°08′31″N 48°21′45″E
- Country: Iran
- Province: Hamadan
- County: Nahavand
- Bakhsh: Central
- Rural District: Shaban

Population (2006)
  - Total: 105
- Time zone: UTC+3:30 (IRST)
  - Summer (DST): UTC+4:30 (IRDT)

Qeshlaq Baba Rostam (Persian: قشلاق بابارستم, also Romanized as Qeshlāq Bābā Rostam; also known as Qeshlāq) is a village in Shaban Rural District, in the Central District of Nahavand County, Hamadan Province, Iran. At the 2006 census, its population was 105, in 26 families.
