= Ab Anbar-e Jahad Ashayeri =

Ab Anbar-e Jahad Ashayeri اب انبارجهادعشايري
- Village
- Country: Iran
- Province: Fars
- County: Mamasani
- Bakhsh: Mahvarmilani
- Rural District: Mishan

Population (2006)
  - Total: 14
- Time zone: UTC+3:30 (IRST)
  - Summer (DST): UTC+4:30 (IRDT)

Ab Anbar-e Jahad Ashayeri (Persian: اب انبارجهادعشايري, also Romanized as Āb Ānbār-e Jahād 'Ashāyīrī) is a village in Mishan Rural District, Mahvarmilani District, Mamasani County, Fars province, Iran. At the 2006 census, its population was 14, in 5 families.
