= Qeshlaq-e Hajji Shahab =

Qeshlaq-e Hajji Shahab قشلاق حاجي شهاب
- Village
- Location within Iran
- Coordinates: 36°31′56″N 46°30′38″E
- Country: Iran
- Province: West Azerbaijan
- County: Bukan
- Bakhsh: Simmineh
- Rural District: Behi Dehbokri

Population (2006)
  - Total: 177
- Time zone: UTC+3:30 (IRST)
  - Summer (DST): UTC+4:30 (IRDT)

Qeshlaq-e Hajji Shahab (Persian: قشلاق حاجي شهاب, also Romanized as Qeshlāq-e Ḩājjī Shahāb; also known as Qeshlāq) is a village in Behi Dehbokri Rural District, Simmineh District, Bukan County, West Azerbaijan Province, Iran. At the 2006 census, its population was 177, in 26 families.
