= Qeshlaq-e Beznabad =

Qeshlaq-e Beznabad قشلاق بزن اباد
- Village
- Location within Iran
- Coordinates: 34°21′17″N 47°29′16″E
- Country: Iran
- Province: Kermanshah
- County: Harsin
- Bakhsh: Bisotun
- Rural District: Cham Chamal

Population (2006)
  - Total: 64
- Time zone: UTC+3:30 (IRST)
  - Summer (DST): UTC+4:30 (IRDT)

Qeshlaq-e Beznabad (Persian: قشلاق بزن اباد, also Romanized as Qeshlāq-e Beznābād; also known as Qeshlāq) is a village in Cham Chamal Rural District, Bisotun District, Harsin County, Kermanshah Province, Iran. At the 2006 census, its population was 64, in 13 families.
