= Qeshlaq-e Ganjeh =

Qeshlaq-e Ganjeh قشلاق گنجه
- Village
- Location within Iran
- Coordinates: 33°37′22″N 49°28′28″E
- Country: Iran
- Province: Lorestan
- County: Azna
- Bakhsh: Japelaq
- Rural District: Japelaq-e Sharqi

Population (2006)
  - Total: 102
- Time zone: UTC+3:30 (IRST)
  - Summer (DST): UTC+4:30 (IRDT)

Qeshlaq-e Ganjeh (Persian: قشلاق گنجه, also Romanized as Qeshlāq-e Ganjeh; also known simply as Qeshlaq (Persian: قشلاق), also Romanized as Qeshlāq and Qishlāq) is a village in Japelaq-e Sharqi Rural District, Japelaq District, Azna County, Lorestan Province, Iran. At the 2006 census, its population was 102, in 25 families.
