= Qeshlaq-e Vosta =

Qeshlaq-e Vosta قشلاق وسطي
- Village
- Location within Iran
- Coordinates: 34°32′22″N 47°35′21″E
- Country: Iran
- Province: Kermanshah
- County: Sahneh
- Bakhsh: Central
- Rural District: Khodabandehlu

Population (2006)
  - Total: 21
- Time zone: UTC+3:30 (IRST)
  - Summer (DST): UTC+4:30 (IRDT)

Qeshlaq-e Vosta (Persian: قشلاق وسطي, also Romanized as Qeshlāq-e Vosţá; also known as Qeshlāq) is a village in Khodabandehlu Rural District, in the Central District of Sahneh County, Kermanshah Province, Iran. At the 2006 census, its population was 21, in 5 families.
