= Qeshlaq, Sonqor =

Qeshlaq قشلاق
- Village
- Location within Iran
- Coordinates: 34°43′00″N 47°41′55″E
- Country: Iran
- Province: Kermanshah
- County: Sonqor
- Bakhsh: Central
- Rural District: Parsinah

Population (2006)
  - Total: 501
- Time zone: UTC+3:30 (IRST)
  - Summer (DST): UTC+4:30 (IRDT)

Qeshlaq (Persian: قشلاق, also Romanized as Qeshlāq) is a village in Parsinah Rural District, in the Central District of Sonqor County, Kermanshah Province, Iran. At the 2006 census, its population was 501, in 126 families.
