= Jeyhun Dasht Rural District =

Rural district in Hamadan province, Iran

Jeyhun Dasht Rural District Persian: دهستان جيحون دشت
- Rural District
- Location within Iran
- Coordinates: 34°54′N 49°00′E
- Country: Iran
- Province: Hamadan
- County: Hamadan
- District: Shara
- Established: 1987
- Capital: Qahavand

Population (2016)
  - Total: 6,918
- Time zone: UTC+3:30 (IRST)

Jeyhun Dasht Rural District (Persian: دهستان جيحون دشت) is in Shara District of Hamadan County, Hamadan province, Iran. It is administered from the city of Qahavand.

== Demographics ==
=== Population ===
At the time of the 2006 National Census, the rural district's population was 8,719 in 1,946 households. There were 7,651 inhabitants in 2,081 households at the following census of 2011. The 2016 census measured the population of the rural district as 6,918 in 1,981 households. The most populous of its 15 villages was Dashteh, with 1,412 people.

=== Other villages in the rural district ===
- Ahmadabad
- Gonbad Chay
- Hizaj
- Jeyhunabad
- Shirinabad
- Yekleh
