= Qeshlaq, Kharameh =

Qeshlaq قشلاق
- Village
- Location within Iran
- Coordinates: 29°36′26″N 53°15′11″E
- Country: Iran
- Province: Fars
- County: Kharameh
- Bakhsh: Central
- Rural District: Sofla

Population (2006)
  - Total: 188
- Time zone: UTC+3:30 (IRST)
  - Summer (DST): UTC+4:30 (IRDT)

Qeshlaq (Persian: قشلاق, also Romanized as Qeshlāq; also known as Gheshlagh and Qeshlāg) is a village in Sofla Rural District, in the Central District of Kharameh County, Fars province, Iran. At the 2006 census, its population was 188, in 46 families.
