= Qeshlaq-e Shakur =

Qeshlaq-e Shakur قشلاق شكور
- Village
- Location within Iran
- Coordinates: 37°44′52″N 45°05′56″E
- Country: Iran
- Province: West Azerbaijan
- County: Urmia
- Bakhsh: Nazlu
- Rural District: Nazlu-e Shomali

Population (2006)
  - Total: 138
- Time zone: UTC+3:30 (IRST)
  - Summer (DST): UTC+4:30 (IRDT)

Qeshlaq-e Shakur (Persian: قشلاق شكور, also Romanized as Qeshlāq-e Shakūr; also known as Qeshlāq and Qeshlāq-e Shakar) is a village in Nazlu-e Shomali Rural District, Nazlu District, Urmia County, West Azerbaijan Province, Iran. At the 2006 census, its population was 138, in 32 families.
