= Qarah Qeshlaq, Vargahan =

Qarah Qeshlaq قره قشلاق
- Village
- Location within Iran
- Coordinates: 38°38′14″N 47°24′45″E
- Country: Iran
- Province: East Azerbaijan
- County: Ahar
- Bakhsh: Central
- Rural District: Vargahan

Population (2006)
  - Total: 67
- Time zone: UTC+3:30 (IRST)
  - Summer (DST): UTC+4:30 (IRDT)

Qarah Qeshlaq (Persian: قره قشلاق, also Romanized as Qarah Qeshlāq and Qareh Qeshlāq) is a village in Vargahan Rural District, in the Central District of Ahar County, East Azerbaijan Province, Iran. At the 2006 census, its population was 67, in 13 families.
