= Qeshlaq-e Bala =

Qeshlaq-e Bala قشلاق بالا
- Village
- Location within Iran
- Coordinates: 38°23′05″N 46°30′36″E
- Country: Iran
- Province: East Azerbaijan
- County: Heris
- Bakhsh: Khvajeh
- Rural District: Mavazekhan-e Shomali

Population (2006)
  - Total: 142
- Time zone: UTC+3:30 (IRST)
  - Summer (DST): UTC+4:30 (IRDT)

Qeshlaq-e Bala (Persian: قشلاق بالا, also Romanized as Qeshlāq-e Bālā and Qeshlāq Bālā; also known as Keshlak-Yukhari, Qeshlāq ‘Olyā, Qeshlāq Yūkhārī, and Qishlāq Yukāri) is a village in Mavazekhan-e Shomali Rural District, Khvajeh District, Heris County, East Azerbaijan Province, Iran. At the 2006 census, its population was 142, in 30 families.
