= Qowzlujeh, Mahabad =

Qowzlujeh قوزلوجه
- Village
- Location within Iran
- Coordinates: 36°37′03″N 45°44′18″E
- Country: Iran
- Province: West Azerbaijan
- County: Mahabad
- Bakhsh: Khalifan
- Rural District: Mangur-e Sharqi

Population (2006)
  - Total: 213
- Time zone: UTC+3:30 (IRST)
  - Summer (DST): UTC+4:30 (IRDT)

Qowzlujeh (Persian: قوزلوجه, also Romanized as Qowzlūjeh and Qvozlūjeh; also known as Kozundja, Qowzlejeh, Qozlūjeh, and Qūzlūcheh) is a village in Mangur-e Sharqi Rural District, Khalifan District, Mahabad County, West Azerbaijan Province, Iran. At the 2006 census, its population was 213, in 29 families.
