= Qarah Qeshlaq, Qeshlaq =

Qarah Qeshlaq قره قشلاق
- Village
- Location within Iran
- Coordinates: 38°31′45″N 47°26′54″E
- Country: Iran
- Province: East Azerbaijan
- County: Ahar
- Bakhsh: Central
- Rural District: Qeshlaq

Population (2006)
  - Total: 29
- Time zone: UTC+3:30 (IRST)
  - Summer (DST): UTC+4:30 (IRDT)

Qarah Qeshlaq (Persian: قره قشلاق, also Romanized as Qarah Qeshlāq and Qareh Qeshlāq) is a village in Qeshlaq Rural District, in the Central District of Ahar County, East Azerbaijan Province, Iran. At the 2006 census, its population was 29, in 5 families.
