= Qeshlaq, Mashhad =

Qeshlaq قشلاق
- Village
- Location within Iran
- Coordinates: 36°04′41″N 59°42′12″E
- Country: Iran
- Province: Razavi Khorasan
- County: Mashhad
- Bakhsh: Razaviyeh
- Rural District: Meyami

Population (2006)
  - Total: 61
- Time zone: UTC+3:30 (IRST)
  - Summer (DST): UTC+4:30 (IRDT)

Qeshlaq (Persian: قشلاق, also Romanized as Qeshlāq and Qishlāq) is a village in Meyami Rural District, Razaviyeh District, Mashhad County, Razavi Khorasan Province, Iran. At the 2006 census, its population was 61, in 17 families.
