= Qeshlaq-e Seyf ol Din =

Qeshlaq-e Seyf ol Din قشلاق سيف الدين
- Village
- Location within Iran
- Coordinates: 37°38′32″N 47°52′17″E
- Country: Iran
- Province: East Azerbaijan
- County: Meyaneh
- Bakhsh: Kandovan
- Rural District: Kandovan

Population (2006)
  - Total: 306
- Time zone: UTC+3:30 (IRST)
  - Summer (DST): UTC+4:30 (IRDT)

Qeshlaq-e Seyf ol Din (Persian: قشلاق سيف الدين, also Romanized as Qeshlāq-e Seyf ol Dīn and Qeshlāq-e Seyf ed Dīn; also known as Qeshlāq) is a village in Kandovan Rural District, Kandovan District, Meyaneh County, East Azerbaijan Province, Iran. At the 2006 census, its population was 306, in 54 families.
