= Qeshlaq, Meyaneh =

Qeshlaq قشلاق
- Village
- Location within Iran
- Coordinates: 37°23′15″N 48°07′36″E
- Country: Iran
- Province: East Azerbaijan
- County: Meyaneh
- Bakhsh: Kaghazkonan
- Rural District: Kaghazkonan-e Shomali

Population (2006)
  - Total: 84
- Time zone: UTC+3:30 (IRST)
  - Summer (DST): UTC+4:30 (IRDT)

Qeshlaq (Persian: قشلاق, also Romanized as Qeshlāq) is a village in Kaghazkonan-e Shomali Rural District, Kaghazkonan District, Meyaneh County, East Azerbaijan Province, Iran. At the 2006 census, its population was 84, in 35 families.
