= Qeshlaq-e Aqa Gureh =

Qeshlaq-e Aqa Gureh قشلاق آقاگوره
- Village
- Location within Iran
- Coordinates: 36°02′47″N 46°31′23″E
- Country: Iran
- Province: Kurdistan
- County: Saqqez
- Bakhsh: Ziviyeh
- Rural District: Khvor Khvoreh

Population (2006)
  - Total: 410
- Time zone: UTC+3:30 (IRST)
  - Summer (DST): UTC+4:30 (IRDT)

Qeshlaq-e Aqa Gureh (Persian: قشلاق آقاگوره, also Romanized as Qeshlāq-e Āqā Gūreh; also known as Qeshlāq) is a village in Khvor Khvoreh Rural District, Ziviyeh District, Saqqez County, Kurdistan Province, Iran. At the 2006 census, its population was 410, in 64 families. The village is populated by Kurds.
