= Qeshlaq-e Olya, Sahneh =

Qeshlaq-e Olya قشلاق عليا
- Village
- Location within Iran
- Coordinates: 34°35′54″N 47°38′50″E
- Country: Iran
- Province: Kermanshah
- County: Sahneh
- Bakhsh: Central
- Rural District: Khodabandehlu

Population (2006)
  - Total: 465
- Time zone: UTC+3:30 (IRST)
  - Summer (DST): UTC+4:30 (IRDT)

Qeshlaq-e Olya (Persian: قشلاق عليا, also Romanized as Qeshlāq-e ‘Olyā; also known as Qeshlāq) is a village in Khodabandehlu Rural District, in the Central District of Sahneh County, Kermanshah Province, Iran. At the 2006 census, its population was 465, in 102 families.
