= Qeshlaq-e Olya, Harsin =

Qeshlaq-e Olya قشلاق عليا
- Village
- Location within Iran
- Coordinates: 34°30′18″N 47°25′30″E
- Country: Iran
- Province: Kermanshah
- County: Harsin
- Bakhsh: Bisotun
- Rural District: Cham Chamal

Population (2006)
  - Total: 70
- Time zone: UTC+3:30 (IRST)
  - Summer (DST): UTC+4:30 (IRDT)

Qeshlaq-e Olya (Persian: قشلاق عليا, also Romanized as Qeshlāq-e ‘Olyā; also known as Qeshlāq-e Bālā) is a village in Cham Chamal Rural District, Bisotun District, Harsin County, Kermanshah Province, Iran. At the 2006 census, its population was 70, in 17 families.
