= Varkash, East Azerbaijan =

Varkash وركش
- Village
- Location within Iran
- Coordinates: 38°26′19″N 46°15′42″E
- Country: Iran
- Province: East Azerbaijan
- County: Shabestar
- Bakhsh: Sufian
- Rural District: Rudqat

Population (2006)
  - Total: 491
- Time zone: UTC+3:30 (IRST)
  - Summer (DST): UTC+4:30 (IRDT)

Varkash (Persian: وركش, also Romanized as Varkesh; also known as Barkash, Barkesh, and Varkech) is a village in Rudqat Rural District, Sufian District, Shabestar County, East Azerbaijan Province, Iran. At the 2006 census, its population was 491, in 109 families.
