= Shur Dasht Rural District =

Rural district in Hamadan province, Iran

Shur Dasht Rural District Persian: دهستان شوردشت
- Rural District
- Location within Iran
- Coordinates: 34°41′N 49°01′E
- Country: Iran
- Province: Hamadan
- County: Hamadan
- District: Shara
- Established: 1987
- Capital: Kowzareh

Population (2016)
  - Total: 5,947
- Time zone: UTC+3:30 (IRST)

Shur Dasht Rural District (Persian: دهستان شوردشت) is in Shara District of Hamadan County, Hamadan province, Iran. Its capital is the village of Kowzareh.

== Demographics ==
=== Population ===
At the time of the 2006 National Census, the rural district's population was 7,675 in 1,750 households. There were 7,018 inhabitants in 1,902 households at the following census of 2011. The 2016 census measured the population of the rural district as 5,947 in 1,776 households. The most populous of its 15 villages was Kowzareh, with 1,864 people.

=== Other villages in the rural district ===
- Abdol Rahim
- Ahmadabad-e Tappeh
- Kheyrabad
- Khomajin
- Moslemabad
- Rahjerd
