= Shara District =

District in Hamadan province, Iran

Shara District Persian: بخش شرا
- District
- Location within Iran
- Coordinates: 34°50′N 48°57′E
- Country: Iran
- Province: Hamadan
- County: Hamadan
- Capital: Qahavand

Population (2016)
  - Total: 20,242
- Time zone: UTC+3:30 (IRST)

Shara District (Persian: بخش شرا) is in Hamadan County, Hamadan province, Iran. Its capital is the city of Qahavand.

== Demographics ==
=== Population ===
At the time of the 2006 National Census, the district's population was 25,509 in 5,793 households. The following census in 2011 counted 23,195 people in 6,247 households. The 2016 census measured the population of the district as 20,242 inhabitants in 5,903 households.

=== Administrative divisions ===
Shara District Population
Administrative Divisions	2006	2011	2016
Chah Dasht RD	6,708	5,411	4,407
Jeyhun Dasht RD	8,719	7,651	6,918
Shur Dasht RD	7,675	7,018	5,947
Qahavand (city)	2,407	3,115	2,970
Total	25,509	23,195	20,242
RD = Rural District
