= Qabaq Tappeh =

Qabaq Tappeh or Qabaq Tepe (Persian: قباق تپه), also rendered as Qapaq Tepe, may refer to:

- Qabaq Tappeh, East Azerbaijan
- Qabaq Tappeh, Hamadan
- Qabaq Tappeh-ye Kord, Hamadan Province
- Qabaq Tappeh, Kermanshah

== See also ==
- Qabaqtəpə, Azerbaijan
