= Kuhin (disambiguation) =

Kuhin is a city in Qazvin Province, Iran.

Kuhin (Persian: كوهين) may also refer to:

- Kuhin, Hamadan
- Kuhin, Markazi
- Kuhin District, in Qazvin Province
- Kuhin Rural District, in Hamadan Province
