= Aq Bolagh, Kabudarahang =

Village in Hamadan province, Iran

Aq Bolagh Persian: آقبلاغ
- Village
- Location within Iran
- Coordinates: 35°22′01″N 48°14′36″E
- Country: Iran
- Province: Hamadan
- County: Kabudarahang
- District: Gol Tappeh
- Rural District: Gol Tappeh

Population (2016)
  - Total: 243
- Time zone: UTC+3:30 (IRST)

Aq Bolagh (Persian: آقبلاغ) (Note: Also romanized as Āq Bolāgh; formerly known as Aqa Bolaghi (آقا بلاغي), also romanized as Āqā Bolāghī) is a village in Gol Tappeh Rural District of Gol Tappeh District in Kabudarahang County, Hamadan province, Iran.

== Demographics ==
=== Population ===
At the time of the 2006 National Census, the village's population was 290 in 62 households. The following census in 2011 counted 268 people in 80 households. The 2016 census measured the population of the village as 243 people in 75 households.
