= Qaratlu, Hamadan =

Qaratlu قراتلو
- Village
- Location within Iran
- Coordinates: 35°29′32″N 48°09′46″E
- Country: Iran
- Province: Hamadan
- County: Kabudarahang
- Bakhsh: Gol Tappeh
- Rural District: Mehraban-e Sofla

Population (2006)
  - Total: 462
- Time zone: UTC+3:30 (IRST)
  - Summer (DST): UTC+4:30 (IRDT)

Qaratlu (Persian: قراتلو, also Romanized as Qarātlū; also known as Gharatloo and Kanatlu) is a village in Mehraban-e Sofla Rural District, Gol Tappeh District, Kabudarahang County, Hamadan Province, Iran. At the 2006 census, its population was 462, in 118 families.
