= Gamin Qaleh =

Village in Hamadan province, Iran

Gamin Qaleh Persian: گمين قلعه
- Village
- Location within Iran
- Coordinates: 35°22′50″N 48°13′35″E
- Country: Iran
- Province: Hamadan
- County: Kabudarahang
- District: Gol Tappeh
- Rural District: Gol Tappeh

Population (2016)
  - Total: 462
- Time zone: UTC+3:30 (IRST)

Gamin Qaleh (Persian: گمين قلعه) (Note: Also romanized as Gamīn Qal‘eh; also known as Gomī Qal‘eh, Jam Qal‘eh, Khamghala, Qīam Qal‘eh, and Qiyām Qal‘eh) is a village in Gol Tappeh Rural District of Gol Tappeh District in Kabudarahang County, Hamadan province, Iran.

== Demographics ==
=== Population ===
At the time of the 2006 National Census, the village's population was 657 in 162 households. The following census in 2011 counted 634 people in 177 households. The 2016 census measured the population of the village as 462 people in 144 households.
