= Dowlatabad-e Hajjilu =

Village in Hamadan province, Iran

Dowlatabad-e Hajjilu Persian: دولت ابادحاجيلو
- Village
- Location within Iran
- Coordinates: 35°16′52″N 48°53′13″E
- Country: Iran
- Province: Hamadan
- County: Kabudarahang
- District: Central
- Rural District: Hajjilu

Population (2016)
  - Total: 0
- Time zone: UTC+3:30 (IRST)

Dowlatabad-e Hajjilu (Persian: دولت ابادحاجيلو) (Note: Also romanized as Dowlatābād-e Ḩājjīlū; also known as Dowlatābād) is a village in Hajjilu Rural District of the Central District in Kabudarahang County, Hamadan province, Iran.

== Demographics ==
=== Population ===
At the time of the 2006 National Census, the village's population was 20 in six households. The following census in 2011 counted a population below the reporting threshold. The 2016 census measured the population of the village as zero.
