= Taraqiyeh =

Village in Hamadan province, Iran

Taraqiyeh Persian: طراقيه
- Village
- Location within Iran
- Coordinates: 35°19′08″N 48°22′16″E
- Country: Iran
- Province: Hamadan
- County: Kabudarahang
- District: Gol Tappeh
- Rural District: Ali Sadr

Population (2016)
  - Total: 586
- Time zone: UTC+3:30 (IRST)

Taraqiyeh (Persian: طراقيه) (Note: Also romanized as Ţarāqīyeh; also known as Taraghiyeh, Taraqayah, Ţarāqayah, Ţarāqayeh, and Targhiyeh) is a village in Ali Sadr Rural District of Gol Tappeh District in Kabudarahang County, Hamadan province, Iran.

== Demographics ==
=== Population ===
At the time of the 2006 National Census, the village's population was 672 in 131 households. The following census in 2011 counted 589 people in 151 households. The 2016 census measured the population of the village as 586 people in 167 households.
