= Hesar-e Qujeh Baghi =

Village in Hamadan province, Iran

Hesar-e Qujeh Baghi Persian: حصار قوجه باغي
- Village
- Location within Iran
- Coordinates: 35°14′15″N 48°33′30″E
- Country: Iran
- Province: Hamadan
- County: Kabudarahang
- District: Central
- Rural District: Sardaran

Population (2016)
  - Total: 871
- Time zone: UTC+3:30 (IRST)

Hesar-e Qujeh Baghi (Persian: حصار قوجه باغي) (Note: Also romanized as Ḩeşār-e Qūjeh Bāghī; also known as Ḩaşār, Ḩeşār, Ḩeşār-e Gowjeh Bāghī, Ḩeşār-e Moḩammad Şāleḩ, Hisār, and Hisār Muhammad Sālih) is a village in, and the capital of, Sardaran Rural District in the Central District of Kabudarahang County, Hamadan province, Iran.

== Demographics ==
=== Population ===
At the time of the 2006 National Census, the village's population was 915 in 209 households. The following census in 2011 counted 1,075 people in 293 households. The 2016 census measured the population of the village as 871 people in 234 households.
