= Nurabad-e Hajjilu =

Village in Hamadan province, Iran

Nurabad-e Hajjilu Persian: نورابادحاجيلو
- Village
- Location within Iran
- Coordinates: 35°10′34″N 48°45′30″E
- Country: Iran
- Province: Hamadan
- County: Kabudarahang
- District: Central
- Rural District: Hajjilu

Population (2016)
  - Total: 2,311
- Time zone: UTC+3:30 (IRST)

Nurabad-e Hajjilu (Persian: نورابادحاجيلو) (Note: Also romanized as Nūrābād-e Ḩājjīlū; also known as Khanabad) is a village in Hajjilu Rural District of the Central District in Kabudarahang County, Hamadan province, Iran.

== Demographics ==
=== Population ===
At the time of the 2006 National Census, the village's population was 2,181 in 498 households. The following census in 2011 counted 2,344 people in 650 households. The 2016 census measured the population of the village as 2,311 people in 694 households.
