= Viyan =

Viyan may refer to:

- Viyən, Azerbaijan
- Vian, Iran
