= Nowabad, Hamadan =

Village in Hamadan province, Iran

Nowabad Persian: نواباد
- Village
- Location within Iran
- Coordinates: 35°07′59″N 48°45′52″E
- Country: Iran
- Province: Hamadan
- County: Kabudarahang
- District: Central
- Rural District: Sabzdasht

Population (2016)
  - Total: 447
- Time zone: UTC+3:30 (IRST)

Nowabad (Persian: نواباد) (Note: Also romanized as Nowābād) is a village in Sabzdasht Rural District of the Central District in Kabudarahang County, Hamadan province, Iran.

== Demographics ==
=== Population ===
At the time of the 2006 National Census, the village's population was 627 in 139 households. The following census in 2011 counted 563 people in 120 households. The 2016 census measured the population of the village as 447 people in 141 households.
