= Churmaq, Kabudarahang =

Churmaq چورمق
- Village
- Location within Iran
- Coordinates: 35°26′32″N 48°08′02″E
- Country: Iran
- Province: Hamadan
- County: Kabudarahang
- Bakhsh: Gol Tappeh
- Rural District: Mehraban-e Sofla

Population (2006)
  - Total: 340
- Time zone: UTC+3:30 (IRST)
  - Summer (DST): UTC+4:30 (IRDT)

Churmaq (Persian: چورمق, also Romanized as Chūrmaq; also known as Choormagh Mehraban) is a village in Mehraban-e Sofla Rural District, Gol Tappeh District, Kabudarahang County, Hamadan Province, Iran. At the 2006 census, its population was 340, in 79 families.
