= Amirabad, Kabudarahang =

Village in Hamadan province, Iran

Amirabad Persian: اميراباد
- Village
- Location within Iran
- Coordinates: 35°13′12″N 48°41′18″E
- Country: Iran
- Province: Hamadan
- County: Kabudarahang
- District: Central
- Rural District: Raheb

Population (2016)
  - Total: 2,002
- Time zone: UTC+3:30 (IRST)

Amirabad (Persian: اميراباد) (Note: Also romanized as Amīrābād) is a village in Raheb Rural District of the Central District in Kabudarahang County, Hamadan province, Iran.

== Demographics ==
=== Population ===
At the time of the 2006 National Census, the village's population was 2,333 in 558 households. The following census in 2011 counted 2,329 people in 640 households. The 2016 census measured the population of the village as 2,002 people in 599 households.
