= Daqdaqabad =

Village in Hamadan province, Iran

Daqdaqabad Persian: داق داق اباد
- Village
- Location within Iran
- Coordinates: 35°10′56″N 48°47′15″E
- Country: Iran
- Province: Hamadan
- County: Kabudarahang
- District: Central
- Rural District: Hajjilu

Population (2016)
  - Total: 4,208
- Time zone: UTC+3:30 (IRST)

Daqdaqabad (Persian: داق داق اباد) (Note: Also romanized as Dāqdāqābād) is a village in, and the capital of, Hajjilu Rural District in the Central District of Kabudarahang County, Hamadan province, Iran.

== Demographics ==
=== Population ===
At the time of the 2006 National Census, the village's population was 4,879 in 1,174 households. The following census in 2011 counted 4,714 people in 1,344 households. The 2016 census measured the population of the village as 4,208 people in 1,302 households, the most populous in its rural district.
