= Khalatabad =

Village in Hamadan province, Iran

Khalatabad Persian: خلعت اباد
- Village
- Location within Iran
- Coordinates: 35°07′43″N 48°48′58″E
- Country: Iran
- Province: Hamadan
- County: Kabudarahang
- District: Central
- Rural District: Sabzdasht

Population (2016)
  - Total: 892
- Time zone: UTC+3:30 (IRST)

Khalatabad (Persian: خلعت اباد) (Note: Also romanized as Khal‘atābād) is a village in Sabzdasht Rural District of the Central District in Kabudarahang County, Hamadan province, Iran.

== Demographics ==
=== Population ===
At the time of the 2006 National Census, the village's population was 977 in 200 households. The following census in 2011 counted 932 people in 234 households. The 2016 census measured the population of the village as 892 people in 227 households.
