= Mokhor =

Mokhor or Mokhur or Makhur or Makhowr or Mokhowr (Persian: مخور), also rendered as Mukhvor, may refer to:

- Mokhor, Hamadan
- Mokhor, Kurdistan
- Mokhor, Chaldoran, West Azerbaijan Province
- Mokhor, Showt, West Azerbaijan Province
