= Kaslan Qiyeh =

Village in Hamadan province, Iran

Kaslan Qiyeh Persian: كسلانقيه
- Village
- Location within Iran
- Coordinates: 35°11′38″N 48°11′07″E
- Country: Iran
- Province: Hamadan
- County: Kabudarahang
- District: Gol Tappeh
- Rural District: Gol Tappeh

Population (2016)
  - Total: 313
- Time zone: UTC+3:30 (IRST)

Kaslan Qiyeh (Persian: كسلانقيه) (Note: Also romanized as Kaslān Qīyeh; also known as Karāsangiyeh, Kaslan Fih, Kaslan Qayah, Kaslān Qayah, Kaslān Qayeh, and Kaslānqayah) is a village in Gol Tappeh Rural District of Gol Tappeh District in Kabudarahang County, Hamadan province, Iran.

== Demographics ==
=== Population ===
At the time of the 2006 National Census, the village's population was 425 in 95 households. The following census in 2011 counted 376 people in 109 households. The 2016 census measured the population of the village as 313 people in 111 households.
