= Qohurd =

Qohurd (Persian: قهورد), also rendered as Qohord or Khokhurd or Kukhurd may refer to:

- Qohurd-e Olya
- Qohurd-e Sofla
