= Rowan, Iran =

Village in Hamadan province, Iran

Rowan Persian: روعان
- Village
- Location within Iran
- Coordinates: 35°08′36″N 48°51′34″E
- Country: Iran
- Province: Hamadan
- County: Kabudarahang
- District: Central
- Rural District: Sabzdasht

Population (2016)
  - Total: 1,730
- Time zone: UTC+3:30 (IRST)

Rowan (Persian: روعان) (Note: Also romanized as Rawān and Row‘ān; also known as Ro‘ān) is a village in Sabzdasht Rural District of the Central District in Kabudarahang County, Hamadan province, Iran.

== Demographics ==
=== Population ===
At the time of the 2006 National Census, the village's population was 2,059 in 488 households. The following census in 2011 counted 1,957 people in 536 households. The 2016 census measured the population of the village as 1,730 people in 493 households.
