= Parvaraq =

Village in Hamadan province, Iran

Parvaraq Persian: پرورق
- Village
- Location within Iran
- Coordinates: 35°09′22″N 48°46′07″E
- Country: Iran
- Province: Hamadan
- County: Kabudarahang
- District: Central
- Rural District: Hajjilu

Population (2016)
  - Total: 1,519
- Time zone: UTC+3:30 (IRST)

Parvaraq (Persian: پرورق) is a village in Hajjilu Rural District of the Central District in Kabudarahang County, Hamadan province, Iran.

== Demographics ==
=== Population ===
At the time of the 2006 National Census, the village's population was 1,321 in 308 households. The following census in 2011 counted 1,533 people in 445 households. The 2016 census measured the population of the village as 1,519 people in 410 households.
