= Kurijan, Hamadan =

Village in Hamadan province, Iran

Kurijan Persian: كوريجان
- Village
- Location within Iran
- Coordinates: 35°02′59″N 48°39′53″E
- Country: Iran
- Province: Hamadan
- County: Kabudarahang
- District: Central
- Rural District: Sabzdasht

Population (2016)
  - Total: 2,175
- Time zone: UTC+3:30 (IRST)

Kurijan (Persian: كوريجان) (Note: Also romanized as Koorījan and Kūrījān; also known as Khur-ī-Jānī) is a village in Sabzdasht Rural District of the Central District in Kabudarahang County, Hamadan province, Iran.

== Demographics ==
=== Population ===
At the time of the 2006 National Census, the village's population was 2,479 in 630 households. The following census in 2011 counted 2,559 people in 765 households. The 2016 census measured the population of the village as 2,175 people in 697 households.
