= Ahmadabad, Kabudarahang =

Village in Hamadan province, Iran

Ahmadabad Persian: احمداباد
- Village
- Location within Iran
- Coordinates: 35°12′28″N 48°34′34″E
- Country: Iran
- Province: Hamadan
- County: Kabudarahang
- District: Central
- Rural District: Sardaran

Population (2016)
  - Total: 597
- Time zone: UTC+3:30 (IRST)

Ahmadabad (Persian: احمداباد) (Note: Also romanized as Aḩmadābād) is a village in Sardaran Rural District of the Central District in Kabudarahang County, Hamadan province, Iran.

== Demographics ==
=== Population ===
At the time of the 2006 National Census, the village's population was 610 in 124 households. The following census in 2011 counted 652 people in 151 households. The 2016 census measured the population of the village as 597 people in 177 households.
