= Sarab, Hamadan =

Village in Hamadan province, Iran

Sarab Persian: سراب
- Village
- Location within Iran
- Coordinates: 35°15′25″N 48°15′18″E
- Country: Iran
- Province: Hamadan
- County: Kabudarahang
- District: Gol Tappeh
- Rural District: Ali Sadr

Population (2016)
  - Total: 741
- Time zone: UTC+3:30 (IRST)

Sarab (Persian: سراب) (Note: Also romanized as Sarāb; also known as Sarab Khoda Bandehloo) is a village in Ali Sadr Rural District of Gol Tappeh District in Kabudarahang County, Hamadan province, Iran.

== Demographics ==
=== Population ===
At the time of the 2006 National Census, the village's population was 896 in 203 households. The following census in 2011 counted 808 people in 239 households. The 2016 census measured the population of the village as 741 people in 228 households.
