= Sarayjuq =

Village in Hamadan province, Iran

Sarayjuq Persian: سرايجوق
- Village
- Location within Iran
- Coordinates: 35°25′43″N 47°57′41″E
- Country: Iran
- Province: Hamadan
- County: Kabudarahang
- District: Gol Tappeh
- Rural District: Mehraban-e Sofla

Population (2016)
  - Total: 440
- Time zone: UTC+3:30 (IRST)

Sarayjuq (Persian: سرايجوق) (Note: Also romanized as Sarāyjūq; also known as Sarajūkh and Sarāyjoq) is a village in Mehraban-e Sofla Rural District of Gol Tappeh District in Kabudarahang County, Hamadan province, Iran.

== Demographics ==
=== Population ===
At the time of the 2006 National Census, the village's population was 701 in 156 households. The following census in 2011 counted 574 people in 149 households. The 2016 census measured the population of the village as 440 people in 133 households.
