= Khaleq Verdi =

Village in Hamadan province, Iran

Khaleq Verdi Persian: خالق وردي
- Village
- Location within Iran
- Coordinates: 35°24′39″N 48°10′52″E
- Country: Iran
- Province: Hamadan
- County: Kabudarahang
- District: Gol Tappeh
- Rural District: Mehraban-e Sofla

Population (2016)
  - Total: 372
- Time zone: UTC+3:30 (IRST)

Khaleq Verdi (Persian: خالق وردي) (Note: Also romanized as Khāleq Verdī; also known as Kal Kurdi and Khalegh Verdi) is a village in Mehraban-e Sofla Rural District of Gol Tappeh District in Kabudarahang County, Hamadan province, Iran.

== Demographics ==
=== Population ===
At the time of the 2006 National Census, the village's population was 421 in 91 households. The following census in 2011 counted 427 people in 98 households. The 2016 census measured the population of the village as 372 people in 113 households.
