= Qatar Quyi =

Village in Hamadan province, Iran

Qatar Quyi Persian: قطارقويي
- Village
- Location within Iran
- Coordinates: 35°19′56″N 48°05′51″E
- Country: Iran
- Province: Hamadan
- County: Kabudarahang
- District: Gol Tappeh
- Rural District: Gol Tappeh

Population (2016)
  - Total: 816
- Time zone: UTC+3:30 (IRST)

Qatar Quyi (Persian: قطارقويي) (Note: Also romanized as Qaţār Qū’ī and Qaţār Qūyī; also known as Ghatar Ghoo’ī, Qatar Koī, Qatar Qui, and Qaţar Qūyū) is a village in Gol Tappeh Rural District of Gol Tappeh District in Kabudarahang County, Hamadan province, Iran.

== Demographics ==
=== Population ===
At the time of the 2006 National Census, the village's population was 1,000 in 222 households. The following census in 2011 counted 926 people in 214 households. The 2016 census measured the population of the village as 816 people in 266 households.
