= Das Qaleh =

Village in Hamadan province, Iran

Das Qaleh Persian: داس قلعه
- Village
- Location within Iran
- Coordinates: 35°14′32″N 48°25′18″E
- Country: Iran
- Province: Hamadan
- County: Kabudarahang
- District: Central
- Rural District: Kuhin

Population (2016)
  - Total: 850
- Time zone: UTC+3:30 (IRST)

Das Qaleh (Persian: داس قلعه) (Note: Also romanized as Dās Qal‘eh) is a village in Kuhin Rural District of the Central District in Kabudarahang County, Hamadan province, Iran.

== Demographics ==
=== Population ===
At the time of the 2006 National Census, the village's population was 1,349 in 270 households. The following census in 2011 counted 1,223 people in 323 households. The 2016 census measured the population of the village as 850 people in 270 households.
