= Qurjineh =

Village in Hamadan province, Iran

Qurjineh Persian: قورجينه
- Village
- Location within Iran
- Coordinates: 35°09′06″N 48°21′33″E
- Country: Iran
- Province: Hamadan
- County: Kabudarahang
- District: Central
- Rural District: Kuhin

Population (2016)
  - Total: 983
- Time zone: UTC+3:30 (IRST)

Qurjineh (Persian: قورجينه) (Note: Also romanized as Qūrjīneh; also known as Ghooreh Jineh, Kurrehjin, Qowreh Chīneh, Qūrah Jīnah, Qūreh Chīneh, Qūreh Jenyeh, and Qūreh Jīneh) is a village in Kuhin Rural District of the Central District in Kabudarahang County, Hamadan province, Iran.

== Demographics ==
=== Population ===
At the time of the 2006 National Census, the village's population was 1,095 in 195 households. The following census in 2011 counted 1,127 people in 263 households. The 2016 census measured the population of the village as 983 people in 282 households.
