= Qoliabad, Hamadan =

Village in Hamadan province, Iran

Qoliabad Persian: قلي اباد
- Village
- Location within Iran
- Coordinates: 35°14′57″N 48°50′27″E
- Country: Iran
- Province: Hamadan
- County: Kabudarahang
- District: Central
- Rural District: Hajjilu

Population (2016)
  - Total: 36
- Time zone: UTC+3:30 (IRST)

Qoliabad (Persian: قلي اباد) (Note: Also romanized as Qolīābād; also known as Gholi Abad, Gholi Kand, and Quliābād) is a village in Hajjilu Rural District of the Central District in Kabudarahang County, Hamadan province, Iran.

== Demographics ==
=== Population ===
At the time of the 2006 National Census, the village's population was 24 in six households. The following census in 2011 counted 34 people in seven households. The 2016 census measured the population of the village as 36 people in 14 households.
