= Ali-Sadr Cave =

Water cave in Ali Sadr, Iran

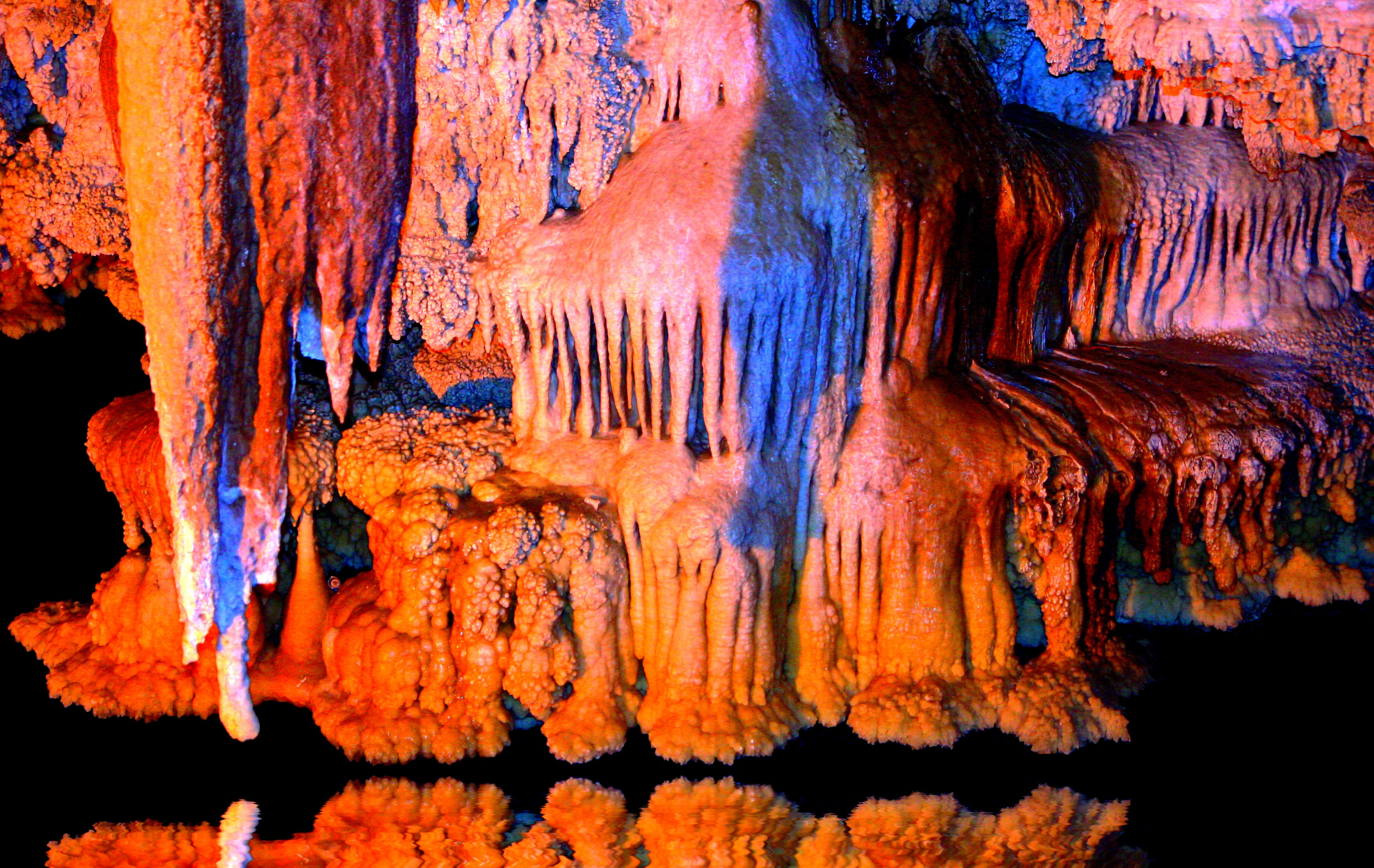

- Location within Iran
- Interactive map of Ali-Sadr Cave
- Location: Kabudarahang County, Hamedan Province, Iran
- Nearest city: Hamedan
- Coordinates: 35°18′06″N 48°18′14″E
- Length: 11.44 kilometres (7.11 mi)
- Governing body: Cultural Heritage and Tourism Organization

The Ali-Sadr Cave (Persian: غار علی‌صدر), originally called Ali Saadr or Ali Sard (meaning cold), is a water cave which attracts visitors every year. It is located in Ali Sadr, Kabudarahang County, about 100 kilometres (62 mi) north of Hamadan, western Iran.

== Description ==
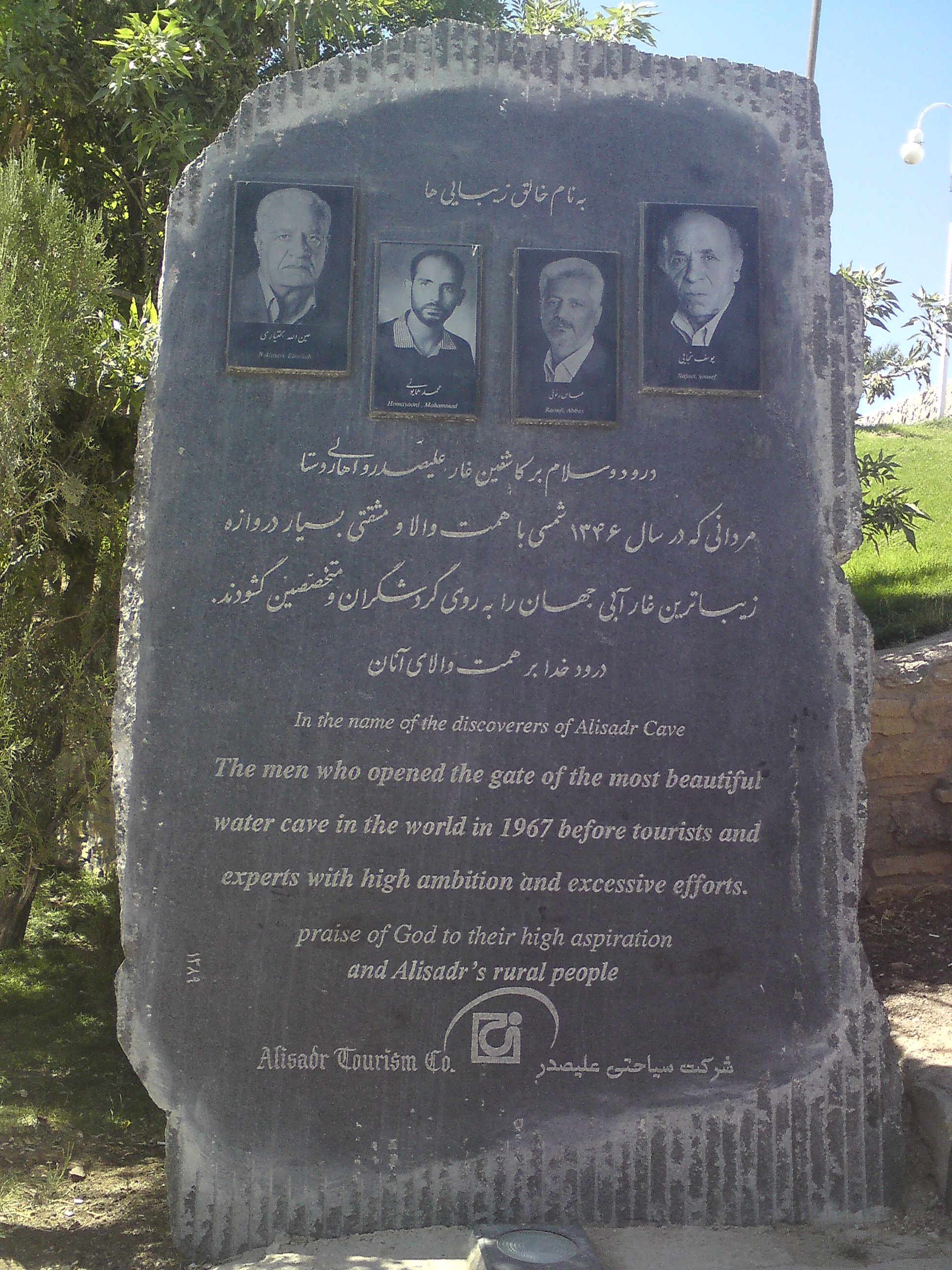
Faces of discovers, engraved on a stone board near cave entrance

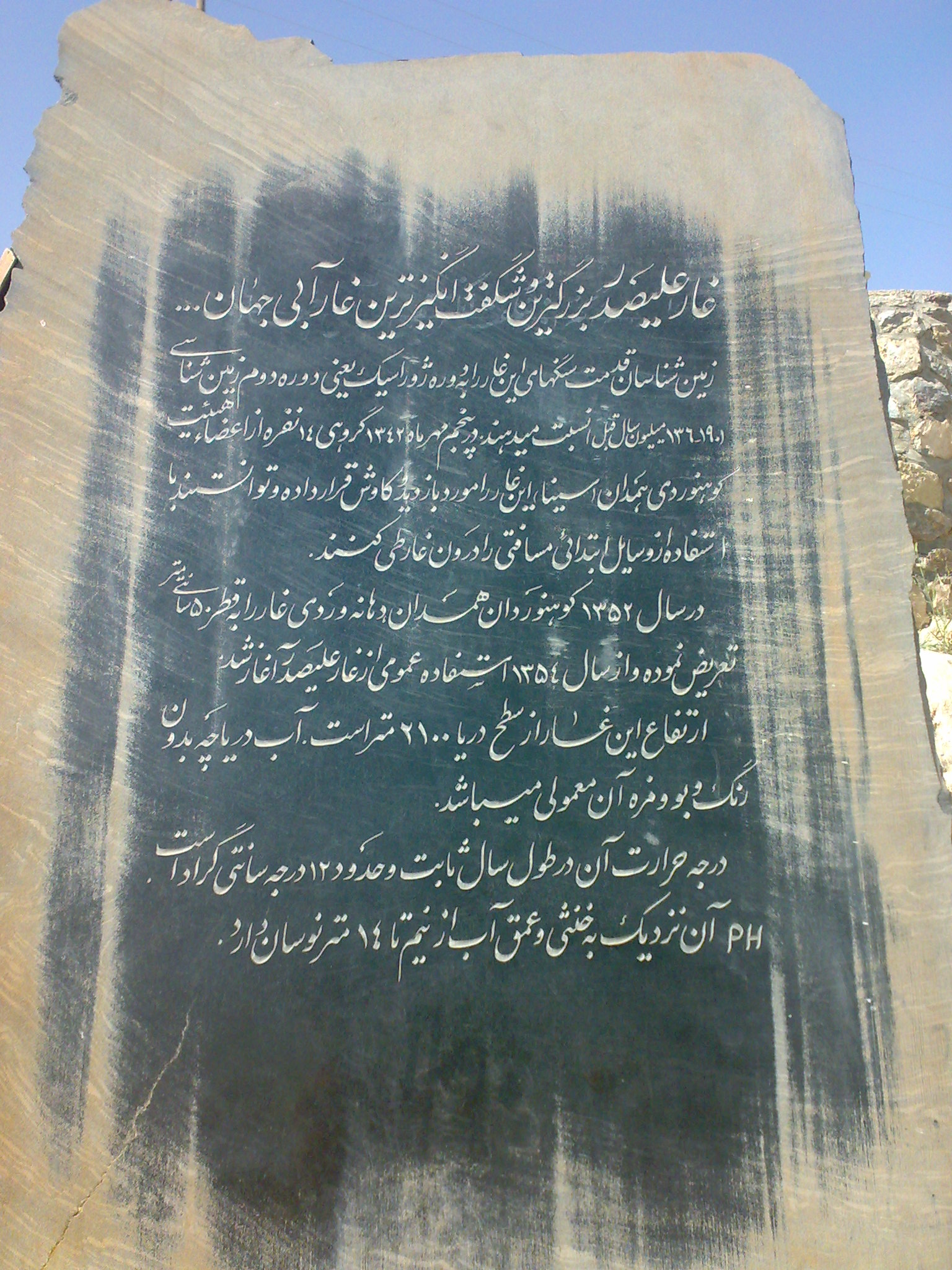
Ali Sadr cave information (in Persian)

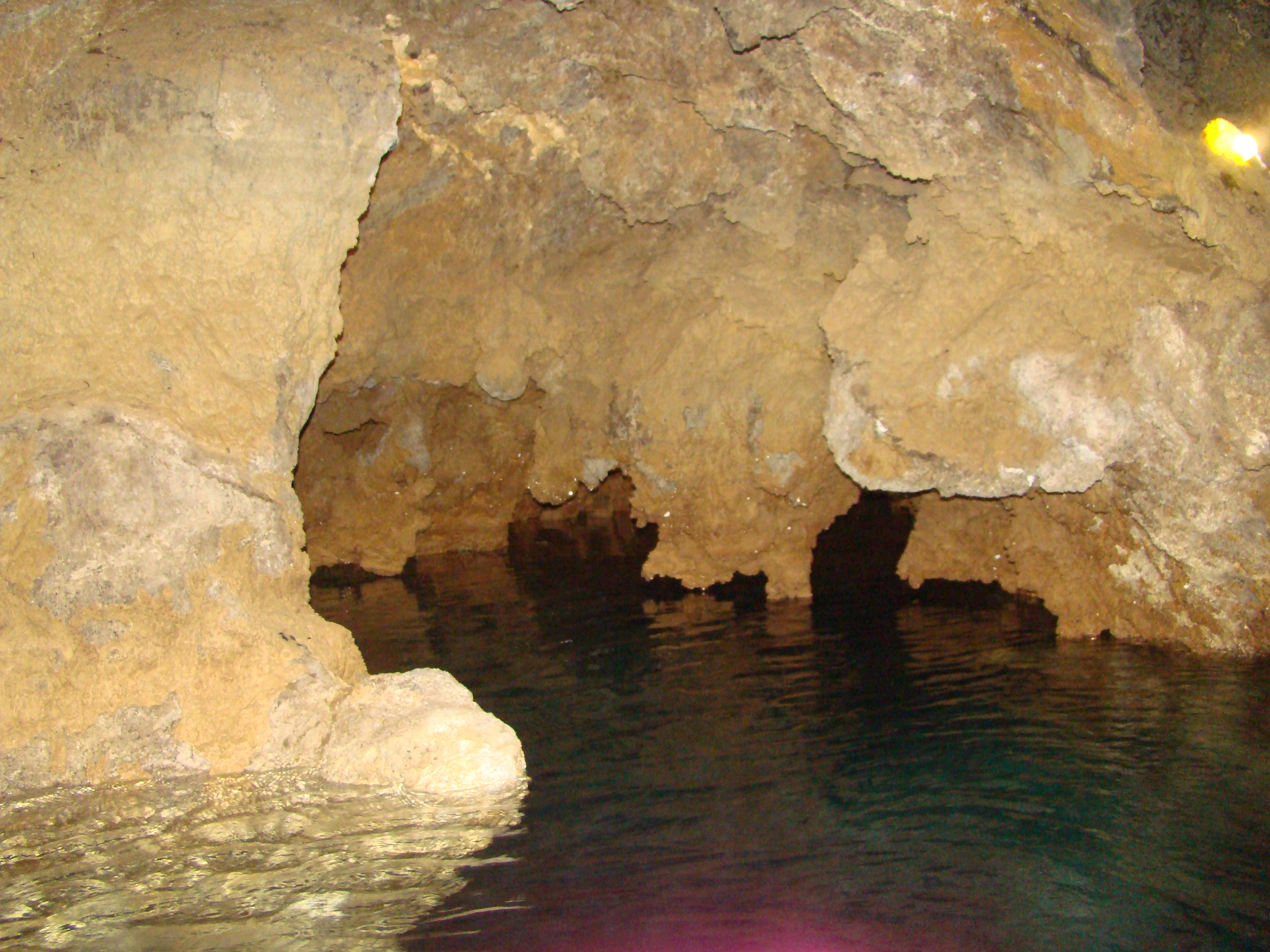
Ali-Sadr Cave

This cave is located at 48°18'E 35°18'N, in the southern part of Ali Sadr village.

In the summer of 2001, a German/British expedition surveyed the cave, finding it to be 11.44 kilometres (7.11 mi).

The cave has been nominated as a World Heritage Site by the Iranian Cultural Heritage, Handicrafts and Tourism Organization. In their submission they describe Ali Sadr as having "too many water halls and wide variety of beautiful features such as stalactites, stalagmites and carst deposits with various forms. This with about 2400 M in cave boating is the biggest cave in the world from this respect."

== Weather conditions ==
Ali Sadr Cave is one of the largest underground water complexes in the world, with a network of canals, lakes and water passages stretching for several kilometers. The water of Alisadr Cave is highly hard due to the presence of lime. It is not suitable for drinking. The cave water has an almost neutral pH level. The water depth can vary between 0.5 and 14 meters. This cave has enough space for swimming and is considered one of the largest navigable caves in the world. The water temperature is a constant 12 degrees Celsius throughout the year. The only living creature in the waters of Ali Sadr Cave is the Nifargus.

== Early occupation ==
Excavations and archaeological studies of the cave have led to the discovery of ancient artworks, jugs and pitchers dating back to 12,000 years ago. Animals, hunting scenes and bows and arrows are depicted on the walls and passages of the exit section. These images suggest mesolithic man used the cave as their abode. The cave was known during the reign of Darius I (r. 522–486 BC) which can be verified by an old inscription at the entrance of the tunnel. However, the knowledge of the existence of the cave was lost and it was only rediscovered in 1963 by Iranian mountaineers.

== Gallery ==
Ali-Sadr Cave
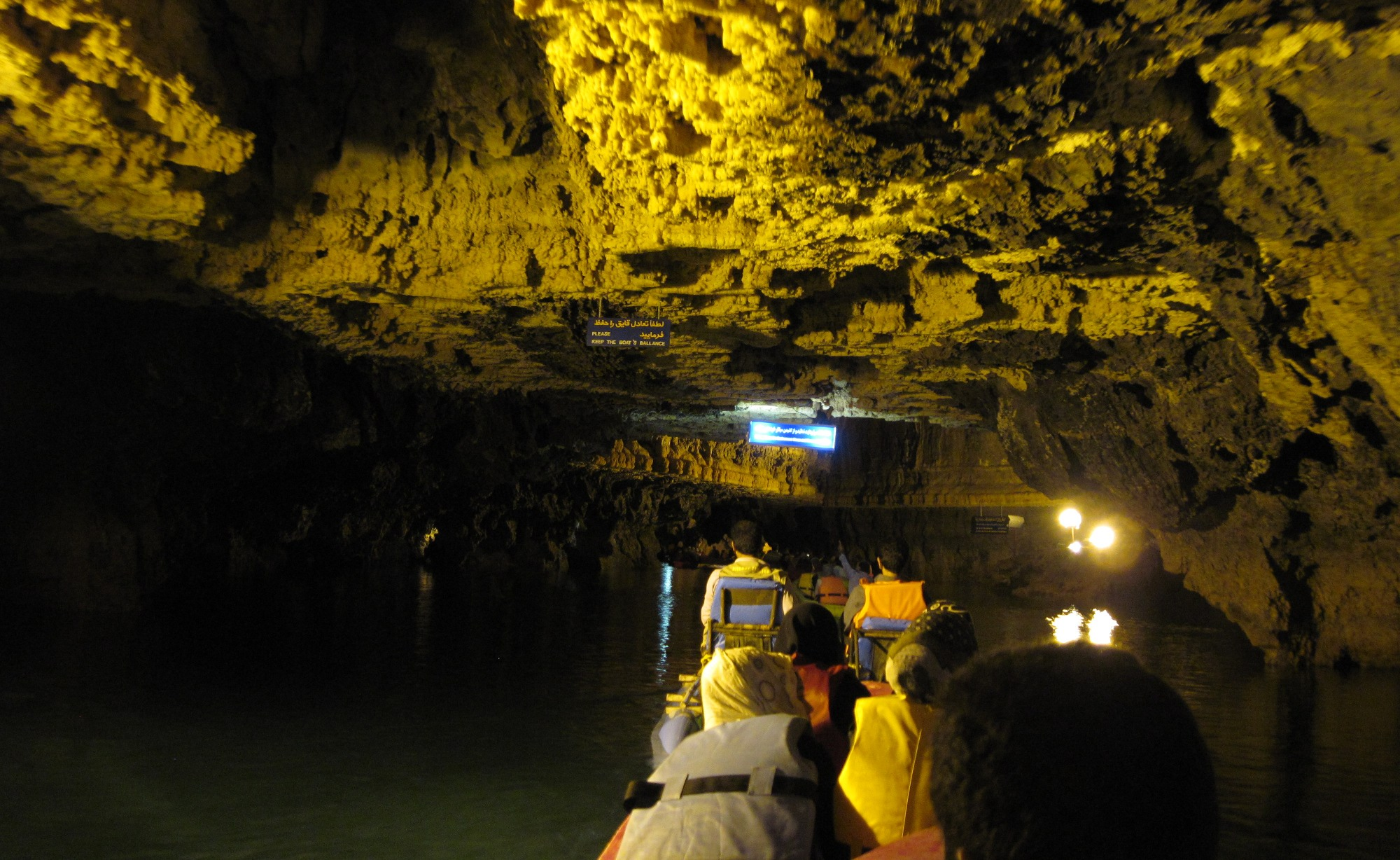
Ali-Sadr Cave

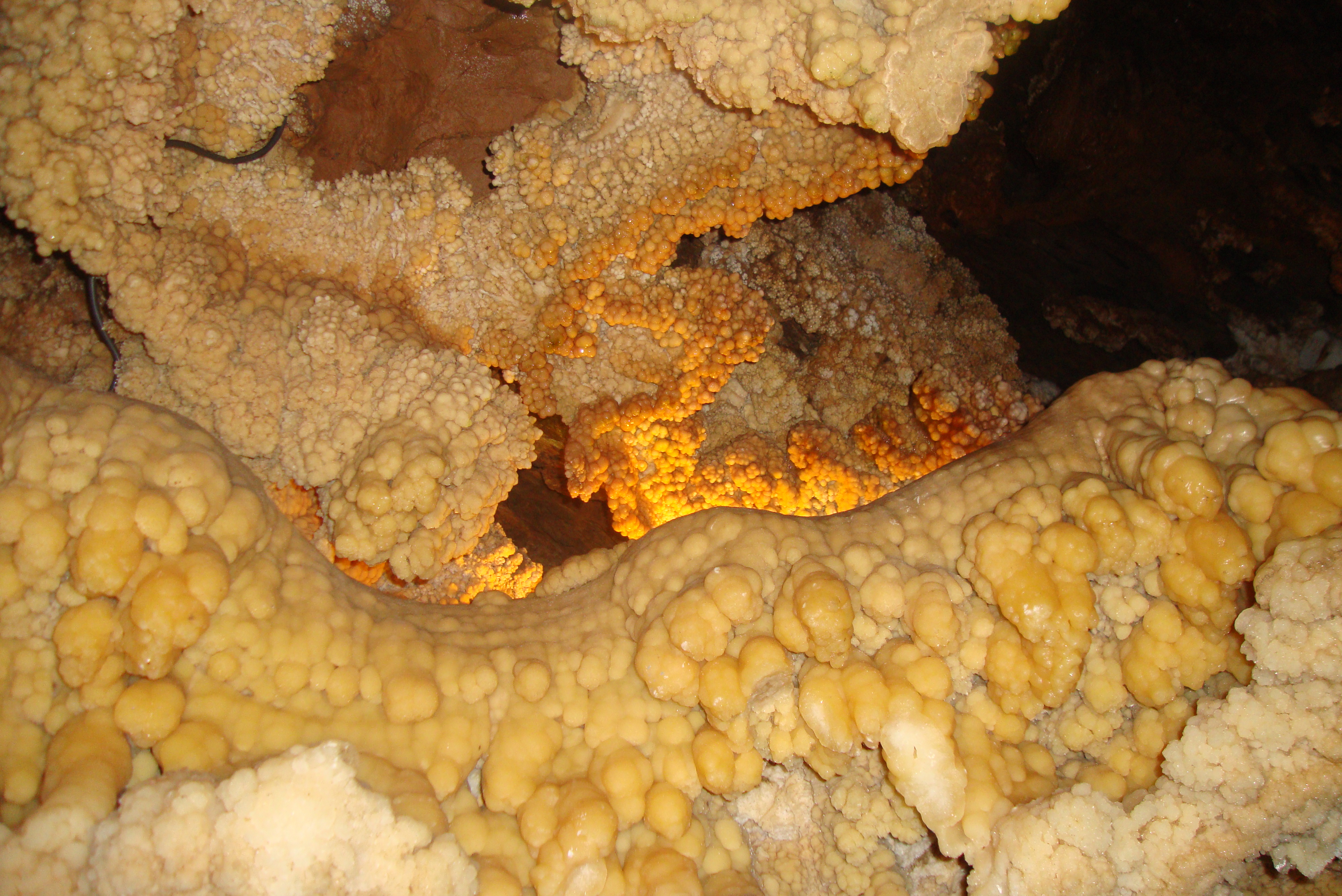

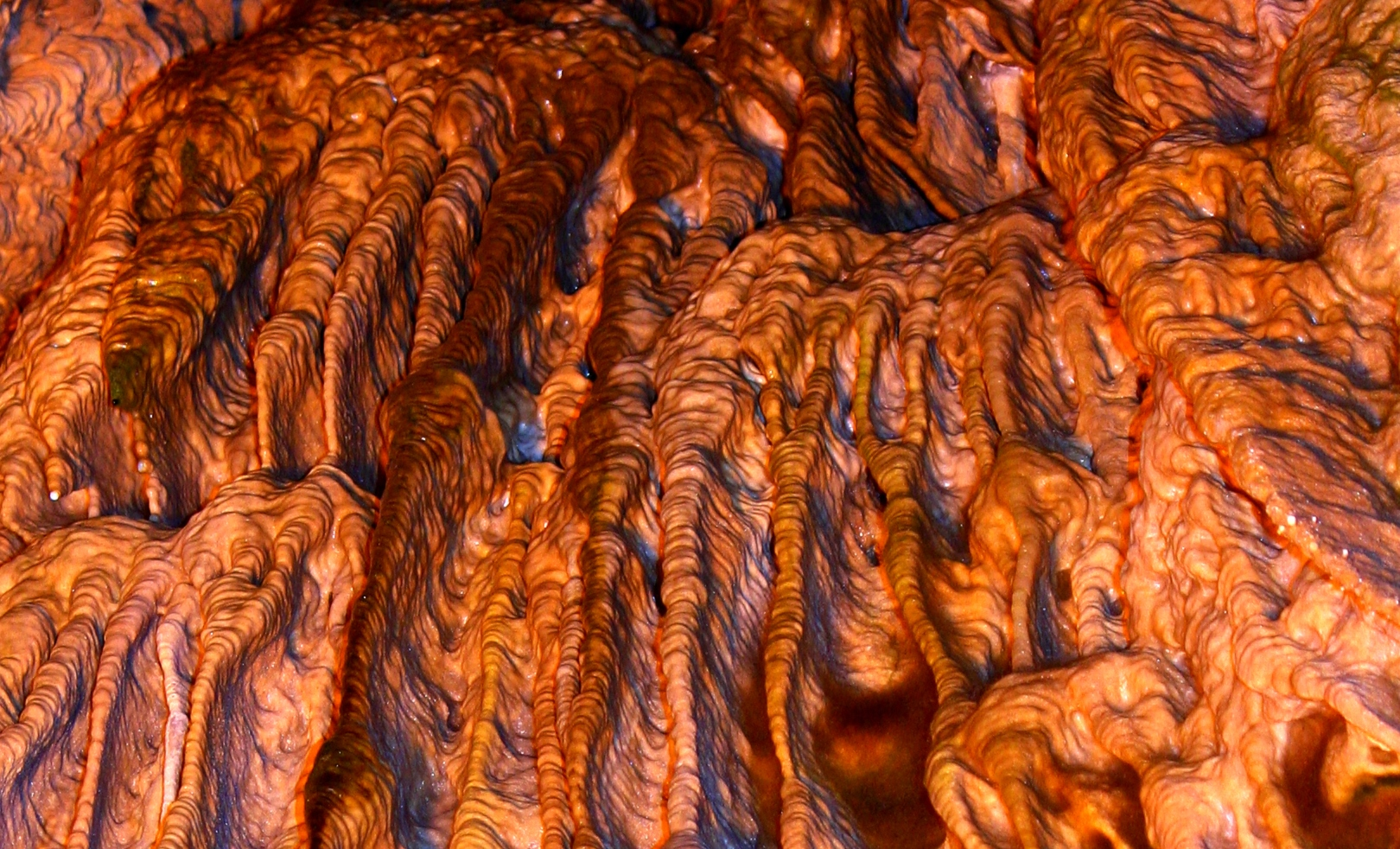

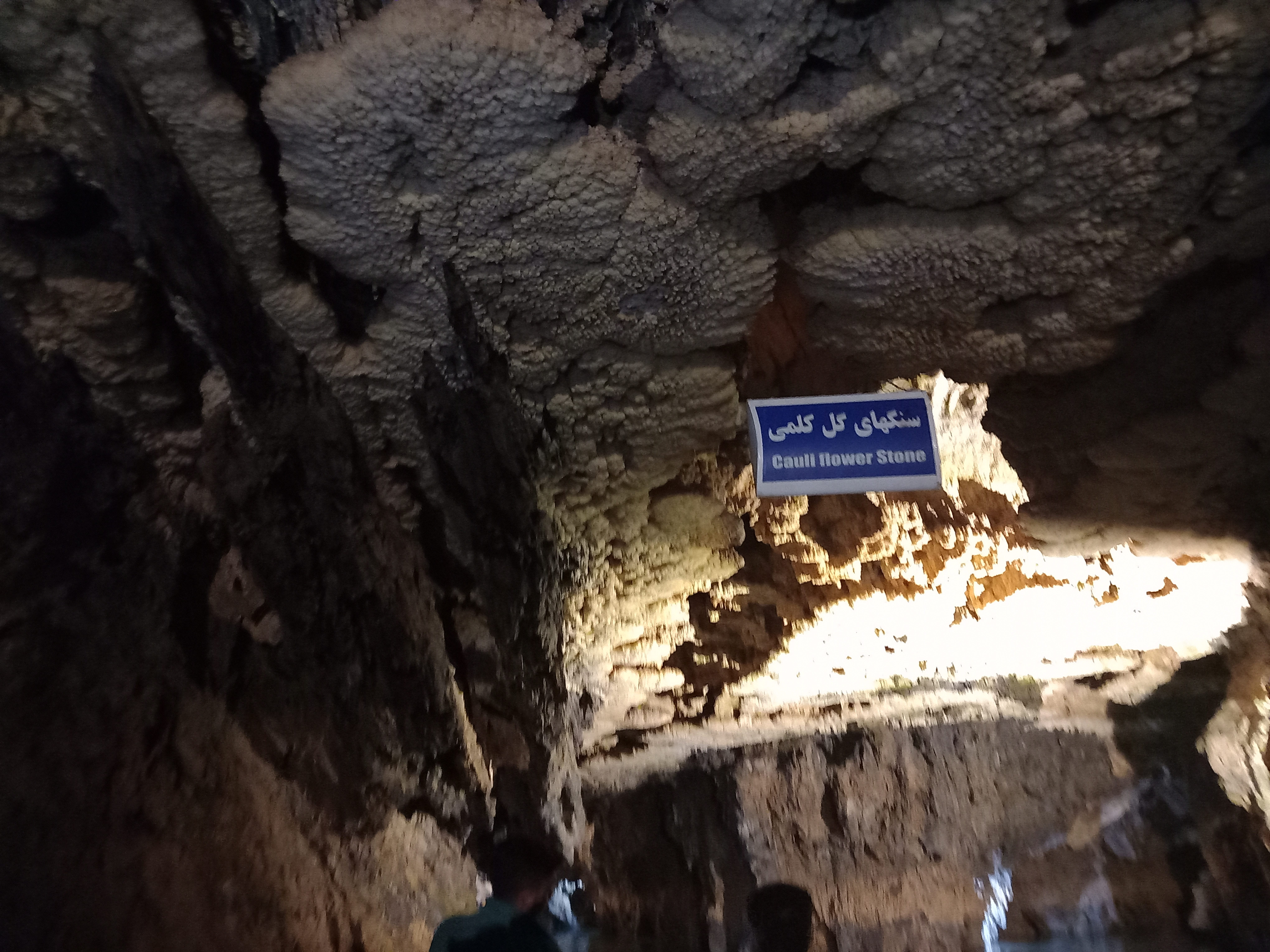
Cauli Flower Stone

== See also ==
- List of caves in Iran
