= Qezeljeh, Hajjilu =

Village in Hamadan province, Iran

Qezeljeh Persian: قزلجه
- Village
- Location within Iran
- Coordinates: 35°17′25″N 48°49′49″E
- Country: Iran
- Province: Hamadan
- County: Kabudarahang
- District: Central
- Rural District: Hajjilu

Population (2016)
  - Total: 849
- Time zone: UTC+3:30 (IRST)

Qezeljeh (Persian: قزلجه) (Note: Also known as Ghezeljeh Hajebloo, Qīzīljāh, and Qīzīljeh) is a village in Hajjilu Rural District of the Central District in Kabudarahang County, Hamadan province, Iran.

== Demographics ==
=== Population ===
At the time of the 2006 National Census, the village's population was 946 in 215 households. The following census in 2011 counted 901 people in 259 households. The 2016 census measured the population of the village as 849 people in 247 households.
