= Chagani =

Chagani (Persian: چاگني or چگني) may refer to:

- Chagani, Fars (چاگني = Chāganī)
- Chagani, Hamadan (چگني - Chaganī)
