= Sari Bolagh =

Sari Bolagh (Persian: ساري بلاغ) may refer to:

- Sari Bolagh, Ardabil
- Sari Bolagh, East Azerbaijan
- Sari Bolagh, Hamadan
