= Sheykh Jarrah =

Village in Hamadan province, Iran

Sheykh Jarrah Persian: شيخ جراح
- Village
- Location within Iran
- Coordinates: 35°30′07″N 48°13′21″E
- Country: Iran
- Province: Hamadan
- County: Kabudarahang
- District: Gol Tappeh
- Rural District: Mehraban-e Sofla

Population (2016)
  - Total: 542
- Time zone: UTC+3:30 (IRST)

Sheykh Jarrah (Persian: شيخ جراح) (Note: Also romanized as Sheikh Jarah, Sheykh Jarāḩ, and Sheykh Jarrāḩ; also known as Shaikh Jarrāh) is a village in Mehraban-e Sofla Rural District of Gol Tappeh District in Kabudarahang County, Hamadan province, Iran.

== Demographics ==
=== Population ===
At the time of the 2006 National Census, the village's population was 1,074 in 212 households. The following census in 2011 counted 832 people in 225 households. The 2016 census measured the population of the village as 542 people in 181 households.
