= Shaveh, Hamadan =

Village in Hamadan province, Iran

Shaveh Persian: شاوه
- Village
- Location within Iran
- Coordinates: 35°10′20″N 48°41′02″E
- Country: Iran
- Province: Hamadan
- County: Kabudarahang
- District: Central
- Rural District: Sabzdasht

Population (2016)
  - Total: 772
- Time zone: UTC+3:30 (IRST)

Shaveh (Persian: شاوه) (Note: Also romanized as Shāvah and Shāveh; also known as Shāhābād) is a village in Sabzdasht Rural District of the Central District in Kabudarahang County, Hamadan province, Iran.

== Demographics ==
=== Population ===
At the time of the 2006 National Census, the village's population was 923 in 242 households. The following census in 2011 counted 805 people in 245 households. The 2016 census measured the population of the village as 772 people in 251 households.
