= Baban, Iran =

Village in Hamadan province, Iran

Baban Persian: بابان
- Village
- Location within Iran
- Coordinates: 35°12′34″N 48°46′08″E
- Country: Iran
- Province: Hamadan
- County: Kabudarahang
- District: Central
- Rural District: Hajjilu

Population (2016)
  - Total: 2,996
- Time zone: UTC+3:30 (IRST)

Baban (Persian: بابان) (Note: Also romanized as Bābān; also known as Buvan) is a village in Hajjilu Rural District of the Central District in Kabudarahang County, Hamadan province, Iran.

== Demographics ==
=== Population ===
At the time of the 2006 National Census, the village's population was 3,026 in 608 households. The following census in 2011 counted 3,385 people in 903 households. The 2016 census measured the population of the village as 2,996 people in 896 households.
