= Salim Sarayi =

Village in Hamadan province, Iran

Salim Sarayi Persian: سليم سرايي
- Village
- Location within Iran
- Coordinates: 35°17′53″N 48°10′24″E
- Country: Iran
- Province: Hamadan
- County: Kabudarahang
- District: Gol Tappeh
- Rural District: Gol Tappeh

Population (2016)
  - Total: 24
- Time zone: UTC+3:30 (IRST)

Salim Sarayi (Persian: سليم سرايي) (Note: Also romanized as Salīm Sarā’ī and Salīm Sarāyī; also known as Salim Sarai) is a village in Gol Tappeh Rural District of Gol Tappeh District in Kabudarahang County, Hamadan province, Iran.

== Demographics ==
=== Population ===
At the time of the 2006 National Census, the village's population was 84 in 18 households. The following census in 2011 counted 60 people in 14 households. The 2016 census measured the population of the village as 24 people in eight households.
