= Eynabad, Kabudarahang =

Village in Hamadan province, Iran

Eynabad Persian: عين اباد
- Village
- Location within Iran
- Coordinates: 35°05′10″N 48°49′31″E
- Country: Iran
- Province: Hamadan
- County: Kabudarahang
- District: Central
- Rural District: Sabzdasht

Population (2016)
  - Total: 375
- Time zone: UTC+3:30 (IRST)
- Website: eitaa.com/Einabad_ir

Eynabad (Persian: عين اباد) (Note: Also romanized as Ainābād and ‘Eynābād; also known as Eyn Abad Hajiloo) is a village in Sabzdasht Rural District of the Central District in Kabudarahang County, Hamadan province, Iran.

== Demographics ==
=== Population ===
At the time of the 2006 National Census, the village's population was 436 in 98 households. The following census in 2011 counted 412 people in 102 households. The 2016 census measured the population of the village as 375 people in 106 households.
