= Sardarabad, Sardaran =

Village in Hamadan province, Iran

Sardarabad Persian: سرداراباد
- Village
- Location within Iran
- Coordinates: 35°15′52″N 48°38′37″E
- Country: Iran
- Province: Hamadan
- County: Kabudarahang
- District: Central
- Rural District: Sardaran

Population (2016)
  - Total: 1,440
- Time zone: UTC+3:30 (IRST)

Sardarabad (Persian: سرداراباد) (Note: Also romanized as Sardārābād) is a village in Sardaran Rural District of the Central District in Kabudarahang County, Hamadan province, Iran.

== Demographics ==
=== Population ===
At the time of the 2006 National Census, the village's population was 1,569 in 388 households. The following census in 2011 counted 1,543 people in 464 households. The 2016 census measured the population of the village as 1,440 people in 405 households.
