= Pir Anbar =

Village in Hamadan province, Iran

Pir Anbar Persian: پيرانبار
- Village
- Location within Iran
- Coordinates: 35°14′33″N 48°30′49″E
- Country: Iran
- Province: Hamadan
- County: Kabudarahang
- District: Central
- Rural District: Sardaran

Population (2016)
  - Total: 748
- Time zone: UTC+3:30 (IRST)

Pir Anbar (Persian: پيرانبار) (Note: Also romanized as Pīr Anbār; also known as Pīr Ambāi and Pīrdwbār) is a village in Sardaran Rural District of the Central District in Kabudarahang County, Hamadan province, Iran.

== Demographics ==
=== Population ===
At the time of the 2006 National Census, the village's population was 689 in 153 households. The following census in 2011 counted 750 people in 213 households. The 2016 census measured the population of the village as 748 people in 219 households.
