= Kerdabad, Hamadan =

Village in Hamadan province, Iran

Kerdabad Persian: كرداباد
- Village
- Location within Iran
- Coordinates: 35°08′10″N 48°47′29″E
- Country: Iran
- Province: Hamadan
- County: Kabudarahang
- District: Central
- Rural District: Hajjilu

Population (2016)
  - Total: 2,341
- Time zone: UTC+3:30 (IRST)

Kerdabad (Persian: كرداباد) (Note: Also romanized as Kerdābād; also known as Kerdābād-e Pūr Valī and Kīrdābād) is a village in Hajjilu Rural District of the Central District in Kabudarahang County, Hamadan province, Iran.

== Demographics ==
=== Population ===
At the time of the 2006 National Census, the village's population was 2,312 in 565 households. The following census in 2011 counted 2,337 people in 680 households. The 2016 census measured the population of the village as 2,341 people in 661 households.
