= Ramishan =

Village in Hamadan province, Iran

Ramishan Persian: راميشان
- Village
- Location within Iran
- Coordinates: 35°09′35″N 48°48′18″E
- Country: Iran
- Province: Hamadan
- County: Kabudarahang
- District: Central
- Rural District: Hajjilu

Population (2016)
  - Total: 876
- Time zone: UTC+3:30 (IRST)

Ramishan (Persian: راميشان) (Note: Also romanized as Rāmīshān) is a village in Hajjilu Rural District of the Central District in Kabudarahang County, Hamadan province, Iran.

== Demographics ==
=== Population ===
At the time of the 2006 National Census, the village's population was 807 in 228 households. The following census in 2011 counted 796 people in 232 households. The 2016 census measured the population of the village as 876 people in 221 households.
