= Qaranqu Darreh =

Village in Hamadan province, Iran

Qaranqu Darreh Persian: قرانقودره
- Village
- Location within Iran
- Coordinates: 35°30′47″N 48°10′39″E
- Country: Iran
- Province: Hamadan
- County: Kabudarahang
- District: Gol Tappeh
- Rural District: Mehraban-e Sofla

Population (2016)
  - Total: 375
- Time zone: UTC+3:30 (IRST)

Qaranqu Darreh (Persian: قرانقودره) (Note: Also romanized as Qarānqū Darreh; also known as Gharanghoo Dareh and Qarān Qadreh) is a village in Mehraban-e Sofla Rural District of Gol Tappeh District in Kabudarahang County, Hamadan province, Iran.

== Demographics ==
=== Population ===
At the time of the 2006 National Census, the village's population was 456 in 99 households. The following census in 2011 counted 426 people in 120 households. The 2016 census measured the population of the village as 375 people in 124 households.
