= Ilanlu, Hamadan =

Village in Hamadan province, Iran

Ilanlu Persian: ايلان لو
- Village
- Location within Iran
- Coordinates: 35°29′00″N 47°55′17″E
- Country: Iran
- Province: Hamadan
- County: Kabudarahang
- District: Gol Tappeh
- Rural District: Mehraban-e Sofla

Population (2016)
  - Total: 387
- Time zone: UTC+3:30 (IRST)

Ilanlu (Persian: ايلان لو) (Note: Also romanized as Īlānlū; also known as Mārān) is a village in Mehraban-e Sofla Rural District of Gol Tappeh District in Kabudarahang County, Hamadan province, Iran.

== Demographics ==
=== Population ===
At the time of the 2006 National Census, the village's population was 410 in 78 households. The following census in 2011 counted 444 people in 101 households. The 2016 census measured the population of the village as 387 people in 109 households.
