= Ovraqin =

Village in Hamadan province, Iran

Ovraqin Persian: اورقين
- Village
- Location within Iran
- Coordinates: 35°16′56″N 48°41′28″E
- Country: Iran
- Province: Hamadan
- County: Kabudarahang
- District: Central
- Rural District: Raheb

Population (2016)
  - Total: 1,503
- Time zone: UTC+3:30 (IRST)

Ovraqin (Persian: اورقين) (Note: Also romanized as Ovraqīn; also known as Auwarghon, Oorghīn, Orqīn, and Ūrqīn) is a village in Raheb Rural District of the Central District in Kabudarahang County, Hamadan province, Iran.

== Demographics ==
=== Population ===
At the time of the 2006 National Census, the village's population was 1,849 in 402 households. The following census in 2011 counted 1,936 people in 530 households. The 2016 census measured the population of the village as 1,503 people in 479 households.
