= Kohneh Hesar, Hamadan =

Kohneh Hesar كهنه حصار
- Village
- Location within Iran
- Coordinates: 35°36′35″N 48°03′15″E
- Country: Iran
- Province: Hamadan
- County: Kabudarahang
- Bakhsh: Gol Tappeh
- Rural District: Mehraban-e Sofla

Population (2006)
  - Total: 323
- Time zone: UTC+3:30 (IRST)
  - Summer (DST): UTC+4:30 (IRDT)

Kohneh Hesar (Persian: كهنه حصار, also Romanized as Kohneh Ḩeşār; also known as Kūh-e Nasār and Kūh-ī-Nasār) is a village in Mehraban-e Sofla Rural District, Gol Tappeh District, Kabudarahang County, Hamadan Province, Iran. At the 2006 census, its population was 323, in 70 families.
