= Hatamabad, Hamadan =

Village in Hamadan province, Iran

Hatamabad Persian: حاتم اباد
- Village
- Location within Iran
- Coordinates: 35°05′16″N 48°44′01″E
- Country: Iran
- Province: Hamadan
- County: Kabudarahang
- District: Central
- Rural District: Sabzdasht

Population (2016)
  - Total: 996
- Time zone: UTC+3:30 (IRST)

Hatamabad (Persian: حاتم اباد) (Note: Also romanized as Ḩātamābād) is a village in Sabzdasht Rural District of the Central District in Kabudarahang County, Hamadan province, Iran.

== Demographics ==
=== Population ===
At the time of the 2006 National Census, the village's population was 1,116 in 295 households. The following census in 2011 counted 1,158 people in 328 households. The 2016 census measured the population of the village as 996 people in 331 households.
