= Qara Gol =

Qara Gol (Persian: قراگل) may refer to:

- Qara Gol, Hamadan
- Qaragol, Kurdistan
- Qara Gol, Sanandaj, Kurdistan Province
- Qaragol, Zanjan
