= Idahlu, Kabudarahang =

Village in Hamadan province, Iran

Idahlu Persian: ايده لو
- Village
- Location within Iran
- Coordinates: 35°20′37″N 48°27′22″E
- Country: Iran
- Province: Hamadan
- County: Kabudarahang
- District: Central
- Rural District: Sardaran

Population (2016)
  - Total: 1,580
- Time zone: UTC+3:30 (IRST)

Idahlu (Persian: ايده لو) (Note: Also romanized as Īdahlū, Idehloo, and Īdehlū; also known as Īdāleh and Īdalū) is a village in Sardaran Rural District of the Central District in Kabudarahang County, Hamadan province, Iran.

== Demographics ==
=== Population ===
At the time of the 2006 National Census, the village's population was 1,803 in 473 households. The following census in 2011 counted 1,674 people in 507 households. The 2016 census measured the population of the village as 1,580 people in 469 households, the most populous in its rural district.
