= Chaleh Kand =

Village in Hamadan province, Iran

Chaleh Kand Persian: چاله كند
- Village
- Location within Iran
- Coordinates: 35°16′30″N 48°17′58″E
- Country: Iran
- Province: Hamadan
- County: Kabudarahang
- District: Gol Tappeh
- Rural District: Ali Sadr

Population (2016)
  - Total: 400
- Time zone: UTC+3:30 (IRST)

Chaleh Kand (Persian: چاله كند) (Note: Also romanized as Chāleh Kand; also known as Chālākand) is a village in Ali Sadr Rural District of Gol Tappeh District in Kabudarahang County, Hamadan province, Iran.

== Demographics ==
=== Population ===
At the time of the 2006 National Census, the village's population was 384 in 75 households. The following census in 2011 counted 362 people in 86 households. The 2016 census measured the population of the village as 400 people in 108 households.
