= Dastjerd, Kabudarahang =

Village in Hamadan province, Iran

Dastjerd Persian: دستجرد
- Village
- Location within Iran
- Coordinates: 35°14′56″N 48°43′11″E
- Country: Iran
- Province: Hamadan
- County: Kabudarahang
- District: Central
- Rural District: Raheb

Population (2016)
  - Total: 3,063
- Time zone: UTC+3:30 (IRST)

Dastjerd (Persian: دستجرد) (Note: Also known as Dasteh Jerd and Dast-ī-Jīrd) is a village in, and the capital of, Raheb Rural District in the Central District of Kabudarahang County, Hamadan province, Iran.

== Demographics ==
=== Population ===
At the time of the 2006 National Census, the village's population was 3,390 in 765 households. The following census in 2011 counted 3,222 people in 859 households. The 2016 census measured the population of the village as 3,063 people in 895 households.
