= Tasran =

Village in Hamadan province, Iran

Tasran Persian: طاسران
- Village
- Location within Iran
- Coordinates: 35°20′16″N 48°38′03″E
- Country: Iran
- Province: Hamadan
- County: Kabudarahang
- District: Central
- Rural District: Raheb

Population (2016)
  - Total: 1,505
- Time zone: UTC+3:30 (IRST)

Tasran (Persian: طاسران) (Note: Also romanized as Ţāsrān; also known as Ţāsīrān and Thāsrān) is a village in Raheb Rural District of the Central District in Kabudarahang County, Hamadan province, Iran.

== Demographics ==
=== Population ===
At the time of the 2006 National Census, the village's population was 1,888 in 461 households. The following census in 2011 counted 1,740 people in 450 households. The 2016 census measured the population of the village as 1,505 people in 458 households.
