= Hamadan Airbase =

Military air base in Iran

Hamadan Airbase Persian: پایگاه هوایی شهید نوژه

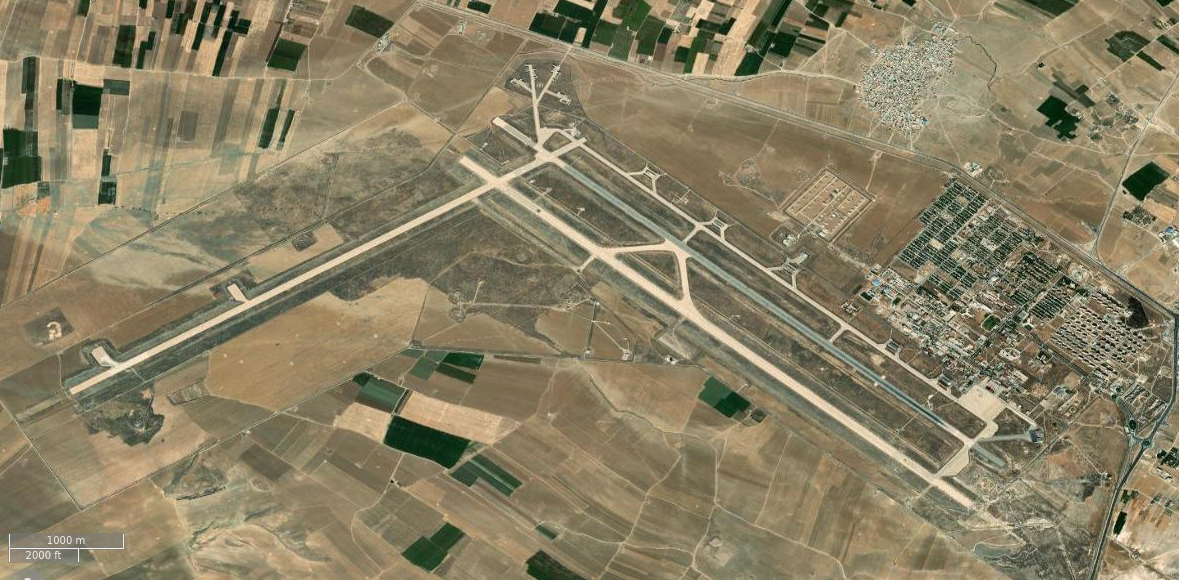
- Satellite imagery of Hamadan Airbase
- IATA: NUJ; ICAO: OIHS

Summary
- Airport type: Military
- Owner/Operator: Islamic Republic of Iran Air Force
- Location: Hamadan
- Elevation AMSL: 5,613 ft (1,711 m)
- Coordinates: 35°12′42″N 48°39′12″E

Map
- Location within Iran

Runways
Direction	Length		Surface
Direction	m	ft	Surface
05/23	3,936	12,915	Asphalt
13R/31L	4,359	14,300	Asphalt

Hamadan Airbase (IATA: NUJ, ICAO: OIHS) or Shahrokhi Airbase or Noje Airbase (Persian: پایگاه هوایی شهید نوژه) is an Islamic Republic of Iran Air Force (IRIAF) base located 47 km north of Hamadan in the Central District of Kabudarahang County, Hamadan province. The airbase is named after Captain Mohammad Noje who became, on 16 August 1979, the first IRIAF pilot to be killed in action. The Nojeh coup plot took place there in 1980.

== Russian Air Force use ==
Since 16 August 2016, the Russian Air Force′s Tupolev Tu-22M long-range bombers and Sukhoi Su-34 strike fighters have used the base for conducting raids over Syria as part of the Russia's military intervention into the Syrian conflict. The bombing missions support the Syrian Arab Army in operations against the Syrian opposition and the Islamic State. It is the first time Iran has let a foreign country use its territory for military operations since the 1979 Iranian Revolution.

Later in August 2016, Iran's minister of defense Hossein Dehghan clarified that Iran was hosting Russia′s aircraft at the request of the Syrian government and Russia was free to utilise it as long as it was necessary. The following day, on 21 August, he appeared to criticise Russia's actions as rash and self-aggrandizing and was quoted as saying, “Under no circumstances will we ever provide Russians with a military base. They have not come here to stay.” On 22 August 2016, Iran's foreign ministry spokesman said Russia would stop using the air base for Syria airstrikes "for the time being".

== Population ==
The airbase is listed as a population point in census documents. At the time of the 2006 National Census, the airbase's population was 7,576 in 2,260 households. The following census in 2011 counted 9,292 people in 2,173 households. The 2016 census measured the population of the airbase as 5,098 people in 1,547 households, the most populous settlement in Raheb Rural District of the Central District in Kabudarahang County.

== See also ==
- Nojeh coup plot
- List of longest runways
