= Qelesh Baghi =

Village in Hamadan province, Iran

Qelesh Baghi Persian: قلش باغي
- Village
- Location within Iran
- Coordinates: 35°19′08″N 48°22′16″E
- Country: Iran
- Province: Hamadan
- County: Kabudarahang
- District: Gol Tappeh
- Rural District: Ali Sadr

Population (2016)
  - Total: 521
- Time zone: UTC+3:30 (IRST)

Qelesh Baghi (Persian: قلش باغي) (Note: Also romanized as Qelesh Bāghī, Qelish Baghi, and Qelish Bāghī; also known as Ghelich Baghi, Kalashbāgh, Qelīch Bāghī, and Qelīj Bāghī (قليج باغي)) is a village in Ali Sadr Rural District of Gol Tappeh District in Kabudarahang County, Hamadan province, Iran.

== Demographics ==
=== Population ===
At the time of the 2006 National Census, the village's population was 533 in 109 households. The following census in 2011 counted 538 people in 143 households. The 2016 census measured the population of the village as 521 people in 143 households.
