= Aland (disambiguation) =

Åland is an archipelago in the Baltic Sea, and a self-governing part of Finland.

Åland or Aland may also refer to:

== Åland Islands ==
- Fasta Åland, the main island in the Åland archipelago
- Åland (parliamentary electoral district), electoral district of Finland
- Province of Åland, former province of Finland (1918–2009)

== Other ==
- Aland (surname), list of people with the surname
- Aland (automobile), an automobile from the early 20th century, manufactured in the United States
- Aland (river), a river in Lower Saxony and Saxony-Anhalt, Germany
- Aland, Saxony-Anhalt, a municipality in Saxony-Anhalt, Germany
- Aland, Karnataka, a town in Karnataka, India
- Aland, West Azerbaijan, a village in Iran
- Aland Rural District, in West Azerbaijan Province, Iran
- Åland (South Korean retailer), South Korean fashion retail chain

== See also ==
- Aland Bala or Alan-e Olya, a village in Gol Tappeh Rural District, Gol Tappeh District, Kabudarahang County, Hamadan Province, Iran
- Aland Pain or Alan-e Sofla, a village in Gol Tappeh Rural District, Gol Tappeh District, Kabudarahang County, Hamadan Province, Iran
- Alandi, a town in the Indian state of Maharashtra
- Allande, municipality in Spain
- Åland War, part of the Crimean War
