= Gozal Abdal =

Village in Hamadan province, Iran

Gozal Abdal Persian: گزل ابدال
- Village
- Location within Iran
- Coordinates: 35°19′18″N 48°14′17″E
- Country: Iran
- Province: Hamadan
- County: Kabudarahang
- District: Gol Tappeh
- Rural District: Ali Sadr

Population (2016)
  - Total: 694
- Time zone: UTC+3:30 (IRST)

Gozal Abdal (Persian: گزل ابدال) (Note: Also romanized as Gozal Abdāl; also known as Gowzal Abdāl, Gūzal Ābdāl, and Qizil Abdāl) is a village in Ali Sadr Rural District of Gol Tappeh District in Kabudarahang County, Hamadan province, Iran.

== Demographics ==
=== Population ===
At the time of the 2006 National Census, the village's population was 711 in 144 households. The following census in 2011 counted 651 people in 185 households. The 2016 census measured the population of the village as 694 people in 211 households.
