= Khabar Arkhi =

Village in Hamadan province, Iran

Khabar Arkhi Persian: خبرارخي
- Village
- Location within Iran
- Coordinates: 35°21′48″N 46°16′35″E
- Country: Iran
- Province: Hamadan
- County: Kabudarahang
- District: Gol Tappeh
- Rural District: Ali Sadr

Population (2016)
  - Total: 896
- Time zone: UTC+3:30 (IRST)

Khabar Arkhi (Persian: خبرارخي) (Note: Also romanized as Khabar Arkhī; also known as Khabar Aikhe and Peykān) is a village in Ali Sadr Rural District of Gol Tappeh District in Kabudarahang County, Hamadan province, Iran.

== Demographics ==
=== Population ===
At the time of the 2006 National Census, the village's population was 949 in 188 households. The following census in 2011 counted 882 people in 249 households. The 2016 census measured the population of the village as 896 people in 243 households.
