= Aq Tappeh, Kabudarahang =

Village in Hamadan province, Iran

Aq Tappeh Persian: اق تپه
- Village
- Location within Iran
- Coordinates: 35°15′13″N 48°41′00″E
- Country: Iran
- Province: Hamadan
- County: Kabudarahang
- District: Central
- Rural District: Raheb

Population (2016)
  - Total: 1,847
- Time zone: UTC+3:30 (IRST)

Aq Tappeh (Persian: اق تپه) (Note: Also romanized as Āq Tappeh; also known as Agh Tapeh Hajebloo and Āq Tepe) is a village in Raheb Rural District of the Central District in Kabudarahang County, Hamadan province, Iran.

== Demographics ==
=== Population ===
At the time of the 2006 National Census, the village's population was 1,937 in 445 households. The following census in 2011 counted 2,042 people in 501 households. The 2016 census measured the population of the village as 1,847 people in 449 households.
