= Gondeh Jin, Kabudarahang =

Village in Hamadan province, Iran

Gondeh Jin Persian: گنده جين
- Village
- Location within Iran
- Coordinates: 35°09′42″N 48°42′21″E
- Country: Iran
- Province: Hamadan
- County: Kabudarahang
- District: Central
- Rural District: Sabzdasht

Population (2016)
  - Total: 255
- Time zone: UTC+3:30 (IRST)

Gondeh Jin (Persian: گنده جين) (Note: Also romanized as Gondeh Jīn; also known as Gand Jīn, Gandehjīn, Gandejin Hajebloo, Ganeh Jīn, and Gundajin) is a village in Sabzdasht Rural District of the Central District in Kabudarahang County, Hamadan province, Iran.

== Demographics ==
=== Population ===
At the time of the 2006 National Census, the village's population was 196 in 54 households. The following census in 2011 counted 234 people in 62 households. The 2016 census measured the population of the village as 255 people in 77 households.
