= Zinabad, Hamadan =

Village in Hamadan province, Iran

Zinabad Persian: زين اباد
- Village
- Location within Iran
- Coordinates: 35°17′09″N 48°23′46″E
- Country: Iran
- Province: Hamadan
- County: Kabudarahang
- District: Central
- Rural District: Kuhin

Population (2016)
  - Total: 735
- Time zone: UTC+3:30 (IRST)

Zinabad (Persian: زين اباد) (Note: Also romanized as Zein Abad and Zīnābād; also known as Zinetābād) is a village in Kuhin Rural District of the Central District in Kabudarahang County, Hamadan province, Iran.

== Demographics ==
=== Population ===
At the time of the 2006 National Census, the village's population was 739 in 147 households. The following census in 2011 counted 728 people in 194 households. The 2016 census measured the population of the village as 735 people in 232 households.
