= Kitu =

Kitu may refer to:

== People ==
- Kitu Gidwani (born 1967), Indian actress and model

== Places ==
- Kitu, Iran
- Kitu, Qechua name of Quito, Ecuador

== Fictional characters ==
- Kitu from Kitu and Woofl
- Kitu Scott from Shortland Street

== Other ==
- KITU-TV
