= Alan-e Olya =

Village in Hamadan province, Iran

Alan-e Olya Persian: الان عليا
- Village
- Location within Iran
- Coordinates: 35°15′46″N 48°11′53″E
- Country: Iran
- Province: Hamadan
- County: Kabudarahang
- District: Gol Tappeh
- Rural District: Gol Tappeh

Population (2016)
  - Total: 233
- Time zone: UTC+3:30 (IRST)

Alan-e Olya (Persian: الان عليا) (Note: Also romanized as Ālān-e ‘Olyā, ‘Alān-e ‘Olyā, and Allān-e ‘Olyā; also known as Alānd Bāla and Ālān-e Bālā) is a village in Gol Tappeh Rural District of Gol Tappeh District in Kabudarahang County, Hamadan province, Iran.

== Demographics ==
=== Population ===
At the time of the 2006 National Census, the village's population was 300 in 55 households. The following census in 2011 counted 269 people in 77 households. The 2016 census measured the population of the village as 233 people in 70 households.
