= Qohurd-e Olya =

Village in Hamadan province, Iran

Qohurd-e Olya Persian: قهورد عليا
- Village
- Location within Iran
- Coordinates: 35°26′22″N 48°04′24″E
- Country: Iran
- Province: Hamadan
- County: Kabudarahang
- District: Gol Tappeh
- Rural District: Mehraban-e Sofla

Population (2016)
  - Total: 934
- Time zone: UTC+3:30 (IRST)

Qohurd-e Olya (Persian: قهوردعليا) (Note: Also romanized as Qohūrd-e ‘Olyā; also known as Ghohordé Olya, Khokhūrd Bāla, Qohord, Qohord-e Bālā, and Qohord-e ‘Olyā) is a village in Mehraban-e Sofla Rural District of Gol Tappeh District in Kabudarahang County, Hamadan province, Iran.

== Demographics ==
=== Population ===
At the time of the 2006 National Census, the village's population was 944 in 237 households. The following census in 2011 counted 1,008 people in 263 households. The 2016 census measured the population of the village as 934 people in 293 households, the most populous in its rural district.
