= Kohneh Hesar =

Kohneh Hesar (Persian: كهنه حصار) may refer to:

- Kohneh Hesar, Hamadan
- Kohneh Hesar, Markazi
