= Ali Sadr =

Village in Hamadan province, Iran

Ali Sadr Persian: علي صدر
- Village
- Location within Iran
- Coordinates: 35°18′24″N 48°18′06″E
- Country: Iran
- Province: Hamadan
- County: Kabudarahang
- District: Gol Tappeh
- Rural District: Ali Sadr

Population (2016)
  - Total: 1,260
- Time zone: UTC+3:30 (IRST)

Ali Sadr (Persian: علي صدر) (Note: Also romanized as ‘Alī Şadr and ‘Alīşadr; also known as Alī Sadd, ‘Alī Sard, and Alsard) is a village in, and the capital of, Ali Sadr Rural District in Gol Tappeh District of Kabudarahang County, Hamadan province, Iran.

== Demographics ==
=== Population ===
At the time of the 2006 National Census, the village's population was 999 in 249 households. The following census in 2011 counted 1,279 people in 335 households. The 2016 census measured the population of the village as 1,260 people in 356 households, the most populous in its rural district.
