= Subashi, Iran =

Village in Hamadan province, Iran

Subashi Persian: سوباشي
- Village
- Location within Iran
- Coordinates: 35°09′50″N 48°14′25″E
- Country: Iran
- Province: Hamadan
- County: Kabudarahang
- District: Gol Tappeh
- Rural District: Gol Tappeh

Population (2016)
  - Total: 1,384
- Time zone: UTC+3:30 (IRST)

Subashi (Persian: سوباشي) (Note: Also romanized as Soobashī and Sūbāshī) is a village in Gol Tappeh Rural District of Gol Tappeh District in Kabudarahang County, Hamadan province, Iran.

== Demographics ==
=== Population ===
At the time of the 2006 National Census, the village's population was 1,547 in 334 households. The following census in 2011 counted 1,496 people in 392 households. The 2016 census measured the population of the village as 1,384 people in 393 households, the most populous in its rural district.
