= Qaratlu =

Qaratlu (Persian: قراتلو) may refer to:

- Qaratlu, East Azerbaijan
- Qaratlu, Hamadan
