= Qara Gol, Hamadan =

Village in Hamadan province, Iran

Qara Gol Persian: قراگل
- Village
- Location within Iran
- Coordinates: 35°16′37″N 48°30′16″E
- Country: Iran
- Province: Hamadan
- County: Kabudarahang
- District: Central
- Rural District: Sardaran

Population (2016)
  - Total: 814
- Time zone: UTC+3:30 (IRST)

Qara Gol (Persian: قراگل) (Note: Also romanized as Qarā Gol; also known as Gharagol) is a village in Sardaran Rural District of the Central District in Kabudarahang County, Hamadan province, Iran.

== Demographics ==
=== Population ===
At the time of the 2006 National Census, the village's population was 950 in 223 households. The following census in 2011 counted 921 people in 286 households. The 2016 census measured the population of the village as 814 people in 216 households.
