= Churmaq =

Churmaq or Chowrmaq (Persian: چورمق) may refer to:

- Churmaq, Kabudarahang
- Churmaq, Razan
