= Vashur =

Village in Hamadan province, Iran

Vashur Persian: واشور
- Village
- Location within Iran
- Coordinates: 35°13′54″N 48°21′06″E
- Country: Iran
- Province: Hamadan
- County: Kabudarahang
- District: Central
- Rural District: Kuhin

Population (2016)
  - Total: 660
- Time zone: UTC+3:30 (IRST)

Vashur (Persian: واشور) (Note: Also romanized as Vashoor and Vāshūr; also known as Bāchūr and Bāshūr) is a village in Kuhin Rural District of the Central District in Kabudarahang County, Hamadan province, Iran.

== Demographics ==
=== Population ===
At the time of the 2006 National Census, the village's population was 608 in 117 households. The following census in 2011 counted 516 people in 162 households. The 2016 census measured the population of the village as 660 people in 184 households.
