= Qabaq Tappeh-ye Kord =

Village in Hamadan province, Iran

Qabaq Tappeh-ye Kord Persian: قباق تپه كرد
- Village
- Location within Iran
- Coordinates: 35°15′14″N 48°10′13″E
- Country: Iran
- Province: Hamadan
- County: Kabudarahang
- District: Gol Tappeh
- Rural District: Gol Tappeh

Population (2016)
  - Total: 484
- Time zone: UTC+3:30 (IRST)

Qabaq Tappeh-ye Kord (Persian: قباق تپه كرد) (Note: Also romanized as Qābāq Tappeh-ye Kord; also known as Ghabagh Tappeh Mehraban, Qābākh Tappah, Qābāq Tappeh, and Qapaq Tepe) is a village in Gol Tappeh Rural District of Gol Tappeh District in Kabudarahang County, Hamadan province, Iran.

== Demographics ==
=== Population ===
At the time of the 2006 National Census, the village's population was 628 in 142 households. The following census in 2011 counted 553 people in 129 households. The 2016 census measured the population of the village as 484 people in 148 households.
