= Vian =

Vian may refer to:

== Places ==
- Vian, Iran, a village in Hamadan Province, Iran
- Vian, Oklahoma, a town located in the United States
- Vian, Norway, a hamlet located in Vestvågøy Municipality, Norway

== People ==
=== Surname ===
- Boris Vian (1920–1959), French writer, poet, singer, and musician
- Dominique Vian (born 1944), French overseas civil servant
- Sir Philip Vian (1894–1968), admiral in the Royal Navy

=== Given name ===
- Vian Smith (1919–1969), author from Devon, United Kingdom, who wrote extensively about horses and the Moors
- Marshall Vian Summers (born 1949), American spiritual leader and author

== Other ==
- Vian, a member of the fictional advanced alien species in the 1968 episode "The Empath" in the original Star Trek television series
