= Sabzdasht Rural District =

Sabzdasht Rural District (Persian: دهستان سبزدشت) may refer to:

- Sabzdasht Rural District (Kabudarahang County)
- Sabzdasht Rural District (Bafq County), Yazd province
