= Farrokh Bolagh =

Farrokh Bolagh (Persian: فرخ بلاغ) may refer to:

- Farrokh Bolagh, East Azerbaijan, village in Iran
- Farrokh Bolagh, Hamadan, village in Iran
