= Kitu, Iran =

Village in Hamadan province, Iran

Kitu Persian: كيتو
- Village
- Location within Iran
- Coordinates: 35°19′11″N 48°09′12″E
- Country: Iran
- Province: Hamadan
- County: Kabudarahang
- District: Gol Tappeh
- Rural District: Gol Tappeh

Population (2016)
  - Total: 272
- Time zone: UTC+3:30 (IRST)

Kitu (Persian: كيتو) (Note: Also romanized as Keytū and Kītū; also known as Geytow, Gīto, and Kaītū) is a village in Gol Tappeh Rural District of Gol Tappeh District in Kabudarahang County, Hamadan province, Iran.

== Demographics ==
=== Population ===
At the time of the 2006 National Census, the village's population was 313 in 79 households. The following census in 2011 counted 313 people in 88 households. The 2016 census measured the population of the village as 272 people in 97 households.
