= Sari Bolagh, Hamadan =

Village in Hamadan province, Iran

Sari Bolagh Persian: ساري بلاغ
- Village
- Location within Iran
- Coordinates: 35°15′21″N 48°52′28″E
- Country: Iran
- Province: Hamadan
- County: Kabudarahang
- District: Central
- Rural District: Hajjilu

Population (2016)
  - Total: 31
- Time zone: UTC+3:30 (IRST)

Sari Bolagh (Persian: ساري بلاغ) (Note: Also romanized as Sārī Bolāgh; also known as S̄ār Bolāgh) is a village in Hajjilu Rural District of the Central District in Kabudarahang County, Hamadan province, Iran.

== Demographics ==
=== Population ===
At the time of the 2006 National Census, the village's population was 27 in six households. The following census in 2011 counted 46 people in 16 households. The 2016 census measured the population of the village as 31 people in 10 households.
