= Subashi =

Subashi may refer to:

- The Soubashi, Ottoman gubernatorial title which most often means the commander of the town or castle
- Subashi Temple, a ruined Buddhist temple on the Silk Road, in Xinjiang, China
- Subashi, Iran, a village in Hamadan Province, Iran
- Subashi Formation, a late Cretaceous formation from Xinjiang, China
