= Aaland =

Aaland is a surname. Notable people with the surname include:

- Bente Irene Aaland (born 1956), Norwegian politician
- Jacob Aaland (1865–1950), Norwegian historian
- Mikkel Aaland (born 1952), Norwegian-American photographer
- Per Knut Aaland (born 1954), Norwegian cross country skier

== See also ==
- Åland
- Aland (disambiguation)
