= Kuhin, Hamadan =

Village in Hamadan province, Iran

Kuhin Persian: كوهين
- Village
- Location within Iran
- Coordinates: 35°12′53″N 48°25′21″E
- Country: Iran
- Province: Hamadan
- County: Kabudarahang
- District: Central
- Rural District: Kuhin

Population (2016)
  - Total: 1,947
- Time zone: UTC+3:30 (IRST)

Kuhin (Persian: كوهين) (Note: Also romanized as Kūhīn) is a village in, and the capital of, Kuhin Rural District in the Central District of Kabudarahang County, Hamadan province, Iran.

== Demographics ==
=== Population ===
At the time of the 2006 National Census, the village's population was 2,045 in 457 households. The following census in 2011 counted 2,305 people in 579 households. The 2016 census measured the population of the village as 1,947 people in 561 households, the most populous in its rural district.
