= Taherlu =

Taherlu (Persian: طاهرلو) may refer to:

- Taherlu, Hamadan
- Taherlu, Zanjan
