= Jaganlu, Hamadan =

Village in Hamadan province, Iran

Jaganlu Persian: جگنلو
- Village
- Location within Iran
- Coordinates: 35°30′55″N 47°58′22″E
- Country: Iran
- Province: Hamadan
- County: Kabudarahang
- District: Gol Tappeh
- Rural District: Mehraban-e Sofla

Population (2016)
  - Total: 371
- Time zone: UTC+3:30 (IRST)

Jaganlu (Persian: جگنلو) (Note: Also romanized as Jaganlū; also known as Chaganī, Chakānlū, Jaganhi, and Jakanlū) is a village in Mehraban-e Sofla Rural District of Gol Tappeh District in Kabudarahang County, Hamadan province, Iran.

== Demographics ==
=== Population ===
At the time of the 2006 National Census, the village's population was 167 in 35 households. The following census in 2011 counted 380 people in 104 households. The 2016 census measured the population of the village as 371 people in 113 households.
