= Taherlu, Hamadan =

Village in Hamadan province, Iran

Taherlu Persian: طاهرلو
- Village
- Location within Iran
- Coordinates: 35°08′28″N 48°25′14″E
- Country: Iran
- Province: Hamadan
- County: Kabudarahang
- District: Central
- Rural District: Kuhin

Population (2016)
  - Total: 849
- Time zone: UTC+3:30 (IRST)

Taherlu (Persian: طاهرلو) (Note: Also romanized as Taher Loo and Ţāherlū; also known as Tehārlū) is a village in Kuhin Rural District of the Central District in Kabudarahang County, Hamadan province, Iran.

== Demographics ==
=== Population ===
At the time of the 2006 National Census, the village's population was 1,017 in 216 households. The following census in 2011 counted 1,062 people in 223 households. The 2016 census measured the population of the village as 849 people in 242 households.
