= Qabaq Tappeh, Hamadan =

Village in Hamadan province, Iran

Qabaq Tappeh Persian: قباق تپه
- Village
- Location within Iran
- Coordinates: 35°22′17″N 48°35′47″E
- Country: Iran
- Province: Hamadan
- County: Kabudarahang
- District: Central
- Rural District: Raheb

Population (2016)
  - Total: 3,641
- Time zone: UTC+3:30 (IRST)

Qabaq Tappeh (Persian: قباق تپه) (Note: Also romanized as Qabāq Tappeh; also known as Ghabagh Tappeh Hajebloo, Qābākh Tappeh, Qabaq Tepe, and Qapāq Tepe) is a village in Raheb Rural District of the Central District in Kabudarahang County, Hamadan province, Iran.

== Demographics ==
=== Population ===
At the time of the 2006 National Census, the village's population was 3,653 in 889 households. The subsequent census in 2011 counted 3,927 people in 1,025 households. The 2016 census recorded the population of the village as 3,641 people in 1,044 households.
