= Dov Berish Weidenfeld =

Chief Rabbi of Tshebin

- דב בריש ויידנפלד
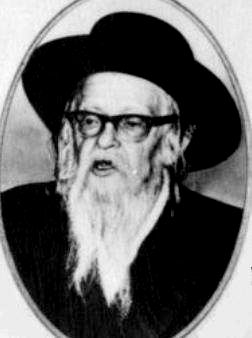

Personal life
- Born: 5 January 1881 Hrymailiv, Kingdom of Galicia and Lodomeria, Austria-Hungary
- Died: 1 November 1965 (aged 84) Jerusalem, Israel
- Resting place: Har HaMenuchot

Religious life
- Religion: Judaism

Rabbi Dov Berish Weidenfeld (Hebrew: דב בריש ויידנפלד; 1881–1965) was the Chief Rabbi of Trzebinia, and after World War II spent his final years in Jerusalem. His principal work of Jewish law is titled Dovev Meisharim.

== Biography ==
Dov Berish was born in Hrimlov, Galicia (now Ukraine) on 5 January 1881 (5 Shvat 5641 in the Jewish calendar) to his father Jacob 'Yekele' Weidenfeld, rabbi of the town and author of the responsa Kochav MiYaakov.

With Reb Yekele's death shortly before Beirish's Bar Mitzvah, the delicate task of raising a new prodigy fell to his widow – herself renowned for her genius and wit (she wrote a great number of her husband's responsa on dictation) and to her two older sons: Reb Yitzchak, who replaced his late father as Rav of Hrimlov and Reb Nachum, Rav of Dombrovo and author of the Chazon Nachum, and later celebrated as a great posek in his own right.

By age 19 Reb Beirish entered by marriage into the family of Rav Yisroel Yoseif HaCharif of Tshebin. Since he did not want any rabbinic post, his wife administered a modest coal business, while he continued his single-minded pursuit of Torah study, amassing knowledge of phenomenal breadth and scope. Nonetheless, the avalanche of requests from varied kehillos that he lead them as their Rav continued, and his friend, Reb Meir Arik, prayed that his business fail so that Klal Yisrael not be deprived of his leadership. For twenty years, this Tshebiner ba'al habayis (layman) – already renowned as the "Gaon of Tshebin" – was consulted by leading rabbanim with whom he maintained a vigorous correspondence; still he remained deaf to all rabbinical offers. However, due to his love of learning and teaching, he would commute daily to and from [Cracow] to say shiurim to the local bachurim after business hours.

He carefully collected copies of these responsa, amassing enough material to publish ten volumes. In 1937 he succeeded in producing the first and only sefer ever printed in Tshebin, entitled Doveiv Meishorim – the other nine volumes were never published.

His noted son-in-law, his successor as rosh yeshiva of Kochav MiYaakov, and a noted gaon and author in his own right, Rabbi Baruch Shimon Schneersohn relates that upon republishing these responsa some 26 years after they were written, he included the Rabbie's subsequent handwritten glosses to the first edition. He found not one correction, only additional proofs to those very answers originally written without as much as a Gemara.

The Tshebiner Rav's picture, along with those of the Rebbes of Ger and Belz, had appeared in the venomous tabloid Der Sturmer, his caption reading: "The world's greatest Talmudist." Realizing that he was a target for elimination, he fled, crossing the Communist border and entering Lvov (Lemberg). Communist authorities were carrying out their systematic erasure of religious life, and the gaon of Tshebin, along with his wife, youngest daughter and thousands of other Jews, were deported to Siberia, arriving in Sverdlovsk, Siberia, in late 1940.

The Tshebiner Rav arrived on Erev Pesach, 1946, in Jerusalem, which he was to call home for the rest of his life. He was soon recognized as one of the leaders of Chareidi Jewry in the Land of Israel and served as a leading member of the Council of Sages of Agudas Yisroel.

He established the Kochav miYaakov Yeshiva in Jerusalem, first in the Shaarei Chesed neighborhood and later in a purpose-built building in Tel Arza.

He died on the 10th of Cheshvan, 5726, 70 minutes before Shabbos. He was interred on Har HaMenuchot.
