= Qohurd-e Sofla =

Village in Hamadan province, Iran

Qohurd-e Sofla Persian: قهورد سفلي
- Village
- Location within Iran
- Coordinates: 35°28′11″N 48°03′34″E
- Country: Iran
- Province: Hamadan
- County: Kabudarahang
- District: Gol Tappeh
- Rural District: Mehraban-e Sofla

Population (2016)
  - Total: 501
- Time zone: UTC+3:30 (IRST)

Qohurd-e Sofla (Persian: قهورد سفلي) (Note: Also romanized as Qohūrd-e Soflá; also known as Ghohordé Sofla, Khokhurd Pāin, Kūkhūrd Pāīn, Qohord, Qohord-e Pā’īn, and Qohord-e Soflá) is a village in, and the capital of, Mehraban-e Sofla Rural District in Gol Tappeh District of Kabudarahang County, Hamadan province, Iran.

== Demographics ==
=== Population ===
At the time of the 2006 National Census, the village's population was 682 in 155 households. The following census in 2011 counted 843 people in 214 households. The 2016 census measured the population of the village as 501 people in 157 households.
