= Jazvan =

Jazvan (Persian: جزوان) may refer to:

- Jazvan, Hamadan
- Jazvan, Zanjan
