= Ji Qi =

Ji Qi is the personal name of:

- Hou Ji or Ji Qi (姬棄; Jī Qì), legendary Chinese cultural hero from the early Xia dynasty
- Duke Min of Lu or Ji Qi (姬啟; Jī Qĭ, died 660 BC), ruler of Lu
- Marquis Qi of Cai or Ji Qi (姬齊; Jī Qí, fl. 450–447 BC), last ruler of Cai (state)

== See also ==
- Jighi, also spelled Jīqī, a village in Sardaran Rural District, Central District, Kabudarahang County, Hamadan Province, Iran
