= Alan-e Sofla =

Village in Hamadan province, Iran

Alan-e Sofla Persian: الان سفلي
- Village
- Location within Iran
- Coordinates: 35°17′03″N 48°12′57″E
- Country: Iran
- Province: Hamadan
- County: Kabudarahang
- District: Gol Tappeh
- Rural District: Gol Tappeh

Population (2016)
  - Total: 446
- Time zone: UTC+3:30 (IRST)

Alan-e Sofla (Persian: الان سفلي) (Note: Also romanized as Ālān-e Soflá, ‘Alān-e Soflá, and Allān-e Soflá; also known as Alānd Pāin and Ālān-e Pā’īn) is a village in Gol Tappeh Rural District of Gol Tappeh District in Kabudarahang County, Hamadan province, Iran.

== Demographics ==
=== Population ===
At the time of the 2006 National Census, the village's population was 497 in 103 households. The following census in 2011 counted 485 people in 145 households. The 2016 census measured the population of the village as 446 people in 129 households.
