= Qerkh Bolagh, Hamadan =

Village in Hamadan province, Iran

Qerkh Bolagh Persian: قرخ بلاغ
- Village
- Location within Iran
- Coordinates: 35°14′02″N 48°28′45″E
- Country: Iran
- Province: Hamadan
- County: Kabudarahang
- District: Central
- Rural District: Sardaran

Population (2016)
  - Total: 517
- Time zone: UTC+3:30 (IRST)

Qerkh Bolagh (Persian: قرخ بلاغ) (Note: Also romanized as Qerkh Bolāgh; also known as Farrokh Bolāgh, Gharakh Bolagh, and Kirkh Bulāqh) is a village in Sardaran Rural District of the Central District in Kabudarahang County, Hamadan province, Iran.

== Demographics ==
=== Population ===
At the time of the 2006 National Census, the village's population was 524 in 138 households. The following census in 2011 counted 448 people in 130 households. The 2016 census measured the population of the village as 517 people in 166 households.
