= Jighi =

Village in Hamadan province, Iran

Jighi Persian: جيغي
- Village
- Location within Iran
- Coordinates: 35°12′01″N 48°29′38″E
- Country: Iran
- Province: Hamadan
- County: Kabudarahang
- District: Central
- Rural District: Sardaran

Population (2016)
  - Total: 569
- Time zone: UTC+3:30 (IRST)

Jighi (Persian: جيغي) (Note: Also romanized as Jīghī; also known as Jaghi and Jīqī) is a village in Sardaran Rural District of the Central District in Kabudarahang County, Hamadan province, Iran.

== Demographics ==
=== Population ===
At the time of the 2006 National Census, the village's population was 505 in 122 households. The following census in 2011 counted 615 people in 173 households. The 2016 census measured the population of the village as 569 people in 174 households.
