= Jazvan, Hamadan =

Village in Hamadan province, Iran

Jazvan Persian: جزوان
- Village
- Location within Iran
- Coordinates: 35°12′18″N 48°19′52″E
- Country: Iran
- Province: Hamadan
- County: Kabudarahang
- District: Central
- Rural District: Kuhin

Population (2016)
  - Total: 567
- Time zone: UTC+3:30 (IRST)

Jazvan (Persian: جزوان) (Note: Also romanized as Jazvān) is a village in Kuhin Rural District of the Central District in Kabudarahang County, Hamadan province, Iran.

== Demographics ==
=== Population ===
At the time of the 2006 National Census, the village's population was 633 in 118 households. The following census in 2011 counted 645 people in 176 households. The 2016 census measured the population of the village as 567 people in 173 households.
