= Raheb Rural District =

Rural district in Hamadan province, Iran

Raheb Rural District Persian: دهستان راهب
- Rural District
- Location within Iran
- Coordinates: 35°19′N 48°39′E
- Country: Iran
- Province: Hamadan
- County: Kabudarahang
- District: Central
- Established: 1987
- Capital: Dastjerd

Population (2016)
  - Total: 18,659
- Time zone: UTC+3:30 (IRST)

Raheb Rural District (Persian: دهستان راهب) is in the Central District of Kabudarahang County, Hamadan province, Iran. Its capital is the village of Dastjerd.

== Demographics ==
=== Population ===
At the time of the 2006 National Census, the rural district's population was 22,626 in 5,780 households. There were 24,488 inhabitants in 6,178 households at the following census of 2011. The 2016 census measured the population of the rural district as 18,659 in 5,471 households. The most populous of its seven villages was Hamadan Airbase, with 5,098 people.

=== Other villages in the rural district ===
- Amirabad
- Aq Tappeh
- Ovraqin
- Qabaq Tappeh
- Tasran
