= Ali Sadr Rural District =

Rural district in Hamadan province, Iran

Ali Sadr Rural District Persian: دهستان علي صدر
- Rural District
- Location within Iran
- Coordinates: 35°19′N 48°20′E
- Country: Iran
- Province: Hamadan
- County: Kabudarahang
- District: Gol Tappeh
- Established: 1987
- Capital: Ali Sadr

Population (2016)
  - Total: 6,884
- Time zone: UTC+3:30 (IRST)

Ali Sadr Rural District (Persian: دهستان علي صدر) is in Gol Tappeh District of Kabudarahang County, Hamadan province, Iran. Its capital is the village of Ali Sadr.

== Demographics ==
=== Population ===
At the time of the 2006 National Census, the rural district's population was 6,872 in 1,486 households. There were 6,773 inhabitants in 1,874 households at the following census of 2011. The 2016 census measured the population of the rural district as 6,884 in 2,019 households. The most populous of its 15 villages was Ali Sadr, with 1,260 people.

=== Other villages in the rural district ===
- Chaleh Kand
- Gozal Abdal
- Khabar Arkhi
- Qelesh Baghi
- Sarab
- Taraqiyeh
