= Hajjilu Rural District =

Rural district in Hamadan province, Iran

Hajjilu Rural District Persian: دهستان حاجي لو
- Rural District
- Location within Iran
- Coordinates: 35°13′N 48°49′E
- Country: Iran
- Province: Hamadan
- County: Kabudarahang
- District: Central
- Established: 1987
- Capital: Daqdaqabad

Population (2016)
  - Total: 15,167
- Time zone: UTC+3:30 (IRST)

Hajjilu Rural District (Persian: دهستان حاجي لو) is in the Central District of Kabudarahang County, Hamadan province, Iran. Its capital is the village of Daqdaqabad.

== Demographics ==
=== Population ===
At the time of the 2006 National Census, the rural district's population was 15,543 in 3,614 households. There were 16,097 inhabitants in 4,538 households at the following census of 2011. The 2016 census measured the population of the rural district as 15,167 in 4,455 households. The most populous of its 10 villages was Daqdaqabad, with 4,208 people.

=== Other villages in the rural district ===
- Baban
- Dowlatabad-e Hajjilu
- Kerdabad
- Nurabad-e Hajjilu
- Parvaraq
- Qezeljeh
- Qoliabad
- Ramishan
- Sari Bolagh
