= Gol Tappeh Rural District (Kabudarahang County) =

Rural district in Hamadan province, Iran

Gol Tappeh Rural District Persian: دهستان گل تپه
- Rural District
- Location within Iran
- Coordinates: 35°17′N 48°07′E
- Country: Iran
- Province: Hamadan
- County: Kabudarahang
- District: Gol Tappeh
- Established: 1987
- Capital: Gol Tappeh

Population (2016)
  - Total: 4,677
- Time zone: UTC+3:30 (IRST)

Gol Tappeh Rural District (Persian: دهستان گل تپه) is in Gol Tappeh District of Kabudarahang County, Hamadan province, Iran. It is administered from the city of Gol Tappeh.

== Demographics ==
=== Population ===
At the time of the 2006 National Census, the rural district's population was 5,741 in 1,272 households. There were 5,380 inhabitants in 1,425 households at the following census of 2011. The 2016 census measured the population of the rural district as 4,677 in 1,441 households. The most populous of its 10 villages was Subashi, with 1,384 people.

=== Other villages in the rural district ===
- Alan-e Olya
- Alan-e Sofla
- Aq Bolagh
- Gamin Qaleh
- Kaslan Qiyeh
- Kitu
- Qabaq Tappeh-ye Kord
- Qatar Quyi
- Salim Sarayi
