= Vian, Iran =

Village in Hamadan province, Iran

Vian Persian: ويان
- Village
- Location within Iran
- Coordinates: 35°05′48″N 48°46′07″E
- Country: Iran
- Province: Hamadan
- County: Kabudarahang
- District: Central
- Rural District: Sabzdasht

Population (2016)
  - Total: 3,712
- Time zone: UTC+3:30 (IRST)

Vian (Persian: ويان) (Note: Also romanized as Veyān, Vīān, and Vīyān) is a village in, and the capital of, Sabzdasht Rural District in the Central District of Kabudarahang County, Hamadan province, Iran.

== Demographics ==
=== Population ===
At the time of the 2006 National Census, the village's population was 3,870 in 871 households. The following census in 2011 counted 4,139 people in 1,203 households. The 2016 census measured the population of the village as 3,712 people in 1,179 households, the most populous in its rural district.
