= Kabudarahang =

City in Hamadan province, Iran

Kabudarahang Persian: کبودراهنگ
- City
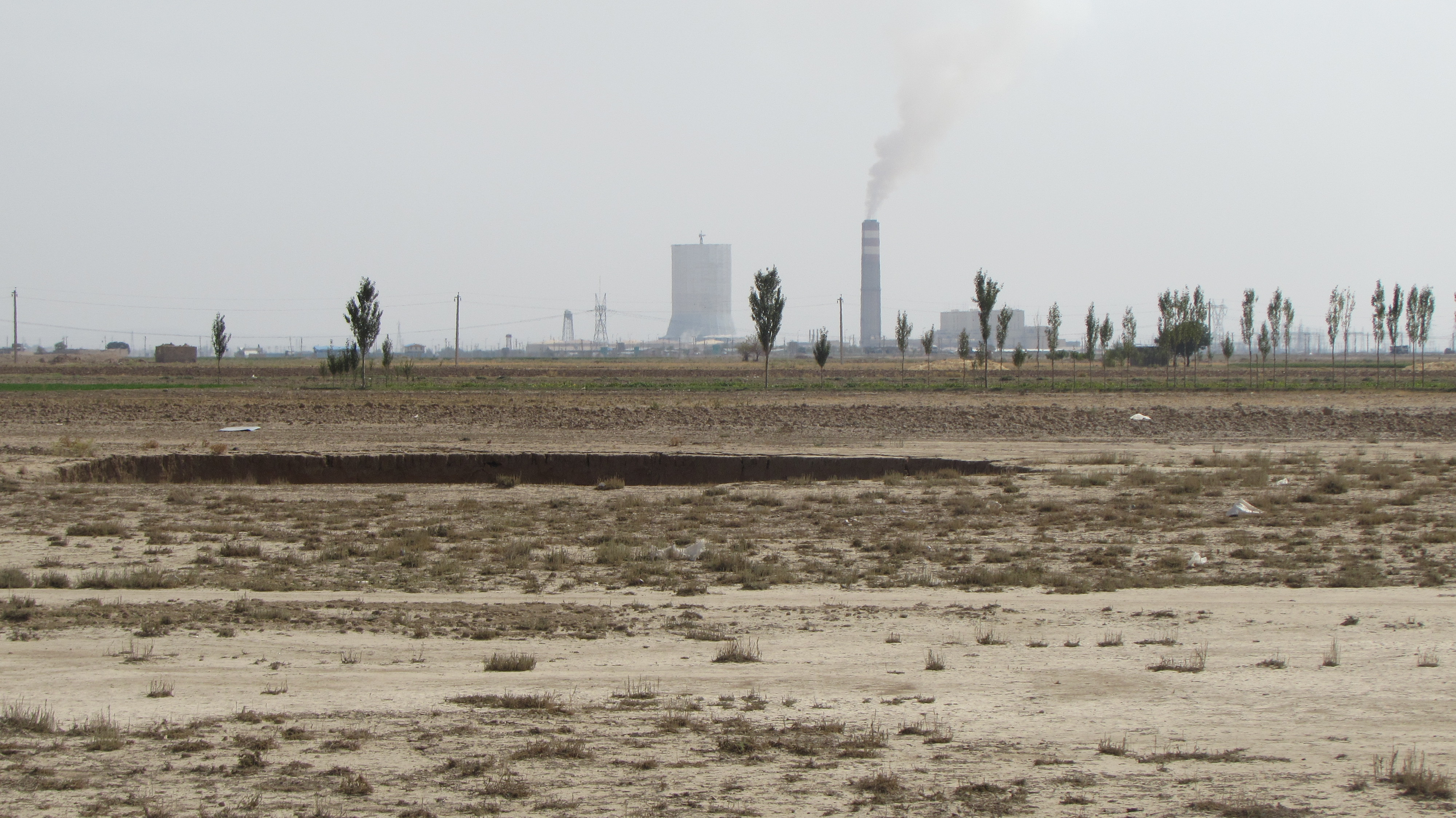
- Shahid Moffateh Kabudarahang Power Plant

- Location within Iran
- Coordinates: 35°12′25″N 48°43′22″E
- Country: Iran
- Province: Hamadan
- County: Kabudarahang
- District: Central

Population (2016)
  - Total: 19,216
- Time zone: UTC+3:30 (IRST)

Kabudarahang (Persian: کبودراهنگ) (Note: Also romanized as Kabood Rahang, Kabūd Rāhang, and Kabūdrāhang; also known as Kabūtarāhang) is a city in the Central District of Kabudarahang County, Hamadan province, Iran, serving as capital of both the county and the district.

== Demographics ==
=== Population ===
At the time of the 2006 National Census, the city's population was 17,200 in 4,940 households. The following census in 2011 counted 18,116 people in 5,727 households. The 2016 census measured the population of the city as 19,216 people in 6,221 households.
