= Sardaran Rural District =

Rural district in Hamadan province, Iran

Sardaran Rural District Persian: دهستان سرداران
- Rural District
- Location within Iran
- Coordinates: 35°15′N 48°34′E
- Country: Iran
- Province: Hamadan
- County: Kabudarahang
- District: Central
- Established: 1997
- Capital: Hesar-e Qujeh Baghi

Population (2016)
  - Total: 9,212
- Time zone: UTC+3:30 (IRST)

Sardaran Rural District (Persian: دهستان سرداران) is in the Central District of Kabudarahang County, Hamadan province, Iran. Its capital is the village of Hesar-e Qujeh Baghi.

== Demographics ==
=== Population ===
At the time of the 2006 National Census, the rural district's population was 9,776 in 2,369 households. There were 9,714 inhabitants in 2,786 households at the following census of 2011. The 2016 census measured the population of the rural district as 9,212 in 2,728 households. The most populous of its 15 villages was Idahlu, with 1,580 people.

=== Other villages in the rural district ===
- Ahmadabad
- Jighi
- Pir Anbar
- Qara Gol
- Qerkh Bolagh
- Sardarabad
