= Gol Tappeh, Hamadan =

City in Hamadan province, Iran

Gol Tappeh Persian: گل تپه
- City
- Location within Iran
- Coordinates: 35°13′09″N 48°12′26″E
- Country: Iran
- Province: Hamadan
- County: Kabudarahang
- District: Gol Tappeh
- Established: 2000

Population (2016)
  - Total: 2,237
- Time zone: UTC+3:30 (IRST)

Gol Tappeh (Persian: گل تپه) (Note: Also known as Kūl Tepe) is a city in, and the capital of, Gol Tappeh District in Kabudarahang County, Hamadan province, Iran. It also serves as the administrative center for Gol Tappeh Rural District. The village of Gol Tappeh was converted to a city in 2000.

== Demographics ==
=== Population ===
At the time of the 2006 National Census, the city's population was 1,876 in 469 households. The following census in 2011 counted 2,692 people in 584 households. The 2016 census measured the population of the city as 2,237 people in 648 households.
