= Kuhin, Markazi =

Kuhin كوهين
- Village
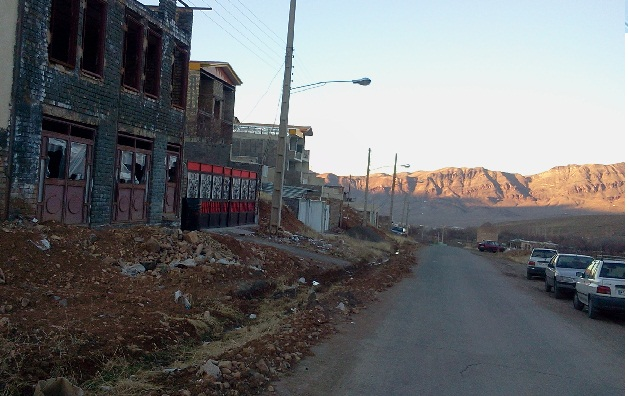
- village overview

- Location within Iran
- Coordinates: 34°40′19″N 50°00′00″E
- Country: Iran
- Province: Markazi
- County: Tafresh
- Bakhsh: Central
- Rural District: Bazarjan

Population (2006)
  - Total: 231
- Time zone: UTC+3:30 (IRST)
  - Summer (DST): UTC+4:30 (IRDT)

Kuhin (Persian: كوهين, also Romanized as Kūhīn) is a village in Bazarjan Rural District in the Central District of Tafresh County, Markazi Province, Iran. As of the 2006 census, Kuhin had a population of 231 residents, contained within 92 families.
