= Qaragol, Kurdistan =

Qaragol قراگل
- Village
- Location within Iran
- Coordinates: 36°07′36″N 47°13′20″E
- Country: Iran
- Province: Kurdistan
- County: Divandarreh
- Bakhsh: Central
- Rural District: Qaratureh

Population (2006)
  - Total: 687
- Time zone: UTC+3:30 (IRST)
  - Summer (DST): UTC+4:30 (IRDT)

Qaragol (Persian: قراگل, also Romanized as Qarāgol; also known as Qarah Gol) is a village in Qaratureh Rural District, in the Central District of Divandarreh County, Kurdistan Province, Iran. At the 2006 census, its population was 687, in 144 families. The village is populated by Kurds.
