= Sari Bolagh, East Azerbaijan =

Sari Bolagh ساري بلاغ
- Village
- Location within Iran
- Coordinates: 38°42′21″N 47°09′37″E
- Country: Iran
- Province: East Azerbaijan
- County: Kaleybar
- Bakhsh: Central
- Rural District: Peyghan Chayi

Population (2006)
  - Total: 38
- Time zone: UTC+3:30 (IRST)
  - Summer (DST): UTC+4:30 (IRDT)

Sari Bolagh (Persian: ساري بلاغ, also Romanized as Sārī Bolāgh; also known as Zarybulag) is a village in Peyghan Chayi Rural District, in the Central District of Kaleybar County, East Azerbaijan Province, Iran. At the 2006 census, its population was 38, in 9 families.
