= Qabaq Tappeh, Kermanshah =

Qabaq Tappeh قباق تپه
- Village
- Location within Iran
- Coordinates: 34°27′46″N 46°37′26″E
- Country: Iran
- Province: Kermanshah
- County: Kermanshah
- Bakhsh: Kuzaran
- Rural District: Sanjabi

Population (2006)
  - Total: 139
- Time zone: UTC+3:30 (IRST)
  - Summer (DST): UTC+4:30 (IRDT)

Qabaq Tappeh (Persian: قباق تپه, also Romanized as Qābāq Tappeh and Qabāq Tappeh; also known as Oabākh Tappeh, Qabāy Tappeh, and Qapāq Tappeh) is a village in Sanjabi Rural District, Kuzaran District, Kermanshah County, Kermanshah Province, Iran. According to the 2006 Census, 139 people lived there in 31 families.
