= Sabzdasht Rural District (Kabudarahang County) =

Rural district in Hamadan province, Iran

Sabzdasht Rural District Persian: دهستان سبزدشت
- Rural District
- Location within Iran
- Coordinates: 35°04′N 48°44′E
- Country: Iran
- Province: Hamadan
- County: Kabudarahang
- District: Central
- Capital: Vian

Population (2016)
  - Total: 12,394
- Time zone: UTC+3:30 (IRST)

Sabzdasht Rural District (Persian: دهستان سبزدشت) is in the Central District of Kabudarahang County, Hamadan province, Iran. Its capital is the village of Vian.

== Demographics ==
=== Population ===
At the time of the 2006 National Census, the rural district's population was 13,987 in 3,335 households. There were 14,042 inhabitants in 3,913 households at the following census of 2011. The 2016 census measured the population of the rural district as 12,394 in 3,784 households. The most populous of its 12 villages was Vian, with 3,712 people.

=== Other villages in the rural district ===
- Eynabad
- Gondeh Jin
- Hatamabad
- Khalatabad
- Kurijan
- Nowabad
- Rowan
- Shaveh
