= Chah Gani =

Chah Gani چاه گني
- Village
- Location within Iran
- Coordinates: 28°24′01″N 55°19′45″E
- Country: Iran
- Province: Fars
- County: Darab
- Bakhsh: Rostaq
- Rural District: Kuhestan

Population (2006)
  - Total: 183
- Time zone: UTC+3:30 (IRST)
  - Summer (DST): UTC+4:30 (IRDT)

Chah Gani (Persian: چاه گني, also Romanized as Chāh Ganī; also known as Chāganī, Chāganu, Chāgūnī, Chāh-e Gūnū, Chah Gooni, Chāh Gūnī, Chāh Gūnow, Chāh Gūnū, and Chākūni) is a village in Kuhestan Rural District, Rostaq District, Darab County, Fars province, Iran. At the 2006 census, its population was 183, in 39 families.
