= Kuhin Rural District =

Rural district in Hamadan province, Iran

Kuhin Rural District Persian: دهستان كوهين
- Rural District
- Location within Iran
- Coordinates: 35°13′N 48°22′E
- Country: Iran
- Province: Hamadan
- County: Kabudarahang
- District: Central
- Established: 1987
- Capital: Kuhin

Population (2016)
  - Total: 8,868
- Time zone: UTC+3:30 (IRST)

Kuhin Rural District (Persian: دهستان كوهين) is in the Central District of Kabudarahang County, Hamadan province, Iran. Its capital is the village of Kuhin.

== Demographics ==
=== Population ===
At the time of the 2006 National Census, the rural district's population was 10,109 in 2,046 households. There were 10,180 inhabitants in 2,604 households at the following census of 2011. The 2016 census measured the population of the rural district as 8,868 in 2,643 households. The most populous of its 14 villages was Kuhin, with 1,947 people.

=== Other villages in the rural district ===
- Das Qaleh
- Jazvan
- Qurjineh
- Taherlu
- Vashur
- Zinabad
