= Viyən =

- Municipality
- Location within Azerbaijan
- Coordinates: 38°42′25″N 48°50′47″E
- Country: Azerbaijan
- Rayon: Lankaran

Population
  - Total: 2,603
- Time zone: UTC+4 (AZT)
  - Summer (DST): UTC+5 (AZT)

Viyən (also, Viyan) is a village and municipality in the Lankaran Rayon of Azerbaijan. It has a population of 2,603.

The village's mosque dates from the 18th century, and is registered with the Ministry of Culture and Tourism.
