= Aland (automobile) =

Defunct American motor vehicle manufacturer

- Industry: Automobile
- Founded: 1916
- Defunct: 1917
- Headquarters: Detroit, Michigan, USA
- Products: automobiles

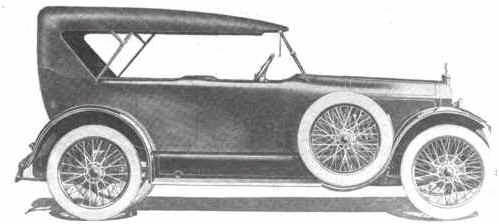
1916 Aland Touring

The Aland was a four-cylinder 2.5-liter 16-valve, single OHC automobile with diagonally connected four-wheel internal expanding brakes and aluminum pistons. It was made in Detroit, Michigan, by the Aland Motor Car Company from 1916 to 1917. Two- and five-seater versions were available for $1500.

== See also ==
- Brass Era car
