= Mokhor, Kurdistan =

Mokhvor مخور
- Village
- Location within Iran
- Coordinates: 35°54′45″N 47°34′48″E
- Country: Iran
- Province: Kurdistan
- County: Bijar
- Bakhsh: Central
- Rural District: Howmeh

Population (2006)
  - Total: 13
- Time zone: UTC+3:30 (IRST)
  - Summer (DST): UTC+4:30 (IRDT)

Mokhvor (Persian: مخور, also Romanized as Mokhowr and Makhowr; also known as Mākhūrlu) is a village in Howmeh Rural District, in the Central District of Bijar County, Kurdistan Province, Iran. At the 2006 census, its population was 13, in 4 families. The village is populated by Kurds.
