= Mehraban-e Sofla Rural District =

Rural district in Hamadan province, Iran

Mehraban-e Sofla Rural District Persian: دهستان مهربان سفلي
- Rural District
- Location within Iran
- Coordinates: 35°30′N 48°04′E
- Country: Iran
- Province: Hamadan
- County: Kabudarahang
- District: Gol Tappeh
- Established: 1987
- Capital: Qohurd-e Sofla

Population (2016)
  - Total: 6,701
- Time zone: UTC+3:30 (IRST)

Mehraban-e Sofla Rural District (Persian: دهستان مهربان سفلي) is in Gol Tappeh District of Kabudarahang County, Hamadan province, Iran. Its capital is the village of Qohurd-e Sofla.

== Demographics ==
=== Population ===
At the time of the 2006 National Census, the rural district's population was 9,158 in 2,015 households. There were 8,428 inhabitants in 2,232 households at the following census of 2011. The 2016 census measured the population of the rural district as 6,701 in 2,126 households. The most populous of its 21 villages was Qohurd-e Olya, with 934 people.

=== Other villages in the rural district ===
- Aq Bolagh-e Morshed
- Ilanlu
- Jaganlu
- Khaleq Verdi
- Qaranqu Darreh
- Sarayjuq
- Sheykh Jarrah
