= Gol Tappeh District =

District in Hamadan province, Iran

Gol Tappeh District Persian: بخش گل‌تپه
- District
- Location within Iran
- Coordinates: 35°24′N 48°10′E
- Country: Iran
- Province: Hamadan
- County: Kabudarahang
- Established: 1989
- Capital: Gol Tappeh

Population (2016)
  - Total: 20,499
- Time zone: UTC+3:30 (IRST)

Gol Tappeh District (Persian: بخش گل‌تپه) is in Kabudarahang County, Hamadan province, Iran. Its capital is the city of Gol Tappeh.

== Demographics ==
=== Population ===
At the time of the 2006 National Census, the district's population was 23,647 in 5,242 households. The following census in 2011 counted 23,273 people in 6,115 households. The 2016 census measured the population of the district as 20,499 inhabitants in 6,234 households.

=== Administrative divisions ===
Gol Tappeh District Population
Administrative Divisions	2006	2011	2016
Ali Sadr RD	6,872	6,773	6,884
Gol Tappeh RD	5,741	5,380	4,677
Mehraban-e Sofla RD	9,158	8,428	6,701
Gol Tappeh (city)	1,876	2,692	2,237
Total	23,647	23,273	20,499
RD = Rural District
