= Central District (Kabudarahang County) =

District in Hamadan province, Iran

Central District (Kabudarahang County) Persian: بخش مرکزی شهرستان کبودراهنگ
- District
- Location within Iran
- Coordinates: 35°14′N 48°36′E
- Country: Iran
- Province: Hamadan
- County: Kabudarahang
- Established: 1989
- Capital: Kabudarahang

Population (2016)
  - Total: 84,636
- Time zone: UTC+3:30 (IRST)

The Central District of Kabudarahang County (Persian: بخش مرکزی شهرستان کبودراهنگ) is in Hamadan province, Iran. Its capital is the city of Kabudarahang.

== Demographics ==
=== Population ===
At the time of the 2006 National Census, the district's population was 91,257 in 22,084 households. The following census in 2011 counted 94,870 people in 25,746 households. The 2016 census measured the population of the district as 84,636 inhabitants in 25,302 households.

=== Administrative divisions ===
Central District (Kabudarahang County) Population
Administrative Divisions	2006	2011	2016
Hajjilu RD	15,543	16,097	15,167
Kuhin RD	10,109	10,180	8,868
Raheb RD	22,626	24,488	18,659
Sabzdasht RD	13,987	14,042	12,394
Sardaran RD	9,776	9,714	9,212
Kabudarahang (city)	19,216	20,349	20,336
Total	91,257	94,870	84,636
RD = Rural District
