= Kabudarahang County =

County in Hamadan province, Iran

Kabudarahang County Persian: شهرستان کبودراهنگ
- County
- Location of Kabudarahang County in Hamadan province (top, yellow)

- Location of Hamadan province in Iran
- Coordinates: 35°21′N 48°26′E
- Country: Iran
- Province: Hamadan
- Established: 1989
- Capital: Kabudarahang
- Districts: Central, Gol Tappeh, Shirin Su

Population (2016)
  - Total: 126,062
- Time zone: UTC+3:30 (IRST)

Kabudarahang County (Persian: شهرستان کبودراهنگ) is in Hamadan province, Iran. Its capital is the city of Kabudarahang.

== Demographics ==
=== Population ===
At the time of the 2006 National Census, the county's population was 137,919 in 32,178 households. The following census in 2011 counted 143,171 people in 38,426 households. The 2016 census measured the population of the county as 126,062 in 37,567 households.

=== Administrative divisions ===
Kabudarahang County's population history and administrative structure over three consecutive censuses are shown in the following table.

Kabudarahang County Population
Administrative Divisions	2006	2011	2016
Central District	91,257	94,870	84,636
Hajjilu RD	15,543	16,097	15,167
Kuhin RD	10,109	10,180	8,868
Raheb RD	22,626	24,488	18,659
Sabzdasht RD	13,987	14,042	12,394
Sardaran RD	9,776	9,714	9,212
Kabudarahang (city)	19,216	20,349	20,336
Gol Tappeh District	23,647	23,273	20,499
Ali Sadr RD	6,872	6,773	6,884
Gol Tappeh RD	5,741	5,380	4,677
Mehraban-e Sofla RD	9,158	8,428	6,701
Gol Tappeh (city)	1,876	2,692	2,237
Shirin Su District	23,015	25,028	20,927
Mehraban-e Olya RD	10,413	11,077	9,168
Shirin Su RD	10,322	10,891	9,299
Shirin Su (city)	2,280	3,060	2,460
Total	137,919	143,171	126,062
RD = Rural District

== See also ==
Media related to Kabudarahang County at Wikimedia Commons
