= Khvoshab =

Khvoshab or Khvosh Ab or Khooshab or Khushab or Khush Ab or Khoshab or Khosh Ab or Khowsh Ab or Khowshab (Persian: خوش اب) may refer to:

- Khvoshab, former name of Jaleq, a city Sistan and Baluchestan Province
- Khvosh Ab, Bushehr
- Khvoshab-e Olya, Hamadan Province
- Khvoshab-e Sofla, Hamadan Province
- Khvosh Ab, Farashband, Fars Province
- Khvosh Ab, Jahrom, Fars Province
- Khvosh Ab, Qir and Karzin, Fars Province
- Khowshab, Khuzestan
- Khoshab, Khuzestan
- Khowshab, Kohgiluyeh and Boyer-Ahmad
- Khvoshab, Kohgiluyeh and Boyer-Ahmad
- Khvoshab, Sanandaj, Kurdistan Province
- Khvoshab, Mazandaran
- Khvoshab, Bardaskan, Razavi Khorasan Province
- Khoshab, Khoshab, Razavi Khorasan Province
- Khoshab County, in Razavi Khorasan Province
- Khvoshab, Sistan and Baluchestan
- Khvoshab, South Khorasan

== See also ==
- Khashab (disambiguation)
- Khushab (disambiguation)
- Khushab, Pakistan
