= Ganj Tappeh =

Village in Hamadan province, Iran

Ganj Tappeh Persian: گنج تپه
- Village
- Location within Iran
- Coordinates: 34°55′56″N 48°27′51″E
- Country: Iran
- Province: Hamadan
- County: Bahar
- District: Central
- Rural District: Siminehrud

Population (2016)
  - Total: 1,739
- Time zone: UTC+3:30 (IRST)

Ganj Tappeh (Persian: گنج تپه) (Note: Also known as Gang Tappeh and Gunj Tepe) is a village in Siminehrud Rural District of the Central District in Bahar County, Hamadan province, Iran.

== Demographics ==
=== Population ===
At the time of the 2006 National Census, the village's population was 1,779 in 437 households, when it was in Sofalgaran Rural District of Lalejin District. The following census in 2011 counted 1,817 people in 508 households. The 2016 census measured the population of the village as 1,739 people in 510 households, by which time the village had been transferred to Siminehrud Rural District of the Central District.
