= Rasulabad, Iran =

Rasulabad (Persian: رسول اباد) may refer to:

- Rasulabad-e Olya, Hamadan Province
- Rasulabad-e Sofla, Hamadan Province
- Rasulabad, Isfahan
- Rasulabad, Kerman
- Rasulabad, Markazi
- Rasulabad, Irandegan. Khash County, Sistan and Baluchestan Province
- Rasulabad, West Azerbaijan
- Rasulabad, Yazd

== See also ==
- Rasulabad, a city in Uttar Pradesh, India
  - Rasulabad (Assembly constituency)
