= Baba Ali, Iran =

Babaali or Baba Ali (Persian: باباعلي) may refer to:

- Baba Ali, Hamadan
- Baba Ali, Kermanshah
- Babaali, Lorestan
