= Zagheh, Bahar =

Village in Hamadan province, Iran

Zagheh Persian: زاغه
- Village
- Location within Iran
- Coordinates: 34°52′35″N 48°20′34″E
- Country: Iran
- Province: Hamadan
- County: Bahar
- District: Central
- Rural District: Siminehrud

Population (2016)
  - Total: 3,328
- Time zone: UTC+3:30 (IRST)

Zagheh (Persian: زاغه) (Note: Also romanized as Zāgheh; also known as Zāgha) is a village in, and the capital of, Siminehrud Rural District in the Central District of Bahar County, Hamadan province, Iran. The previous capital of the rural district was the village of Abrumand, now in Abrumand Rural District.

== Demographics ==
=== Population ===
At the time of the 2006 National Census, the village's population was 3,053 in 755 households. The following census in 2011 counted 3,421 people in 1,025 households. The 2016 census measured the population of the village as 3,328 people in 1,061 households, the most populous in its rural district.
