= Rayegan =

Rayegan (Persian: رايگان), also rendered as Raykan, may refer to:

- Rayegan, Kermanshah
- Rayegan-e Olya, Hamadan Province
- Rayegan-e Sofla, Hamadan Province
- Masoud Rayegan, Iranian actor
