= Lalejin =

City in Hamadan province, Iran

Lalejin Persian: لالجين Azerbaijani: للین, Lalin Ləlin
- City
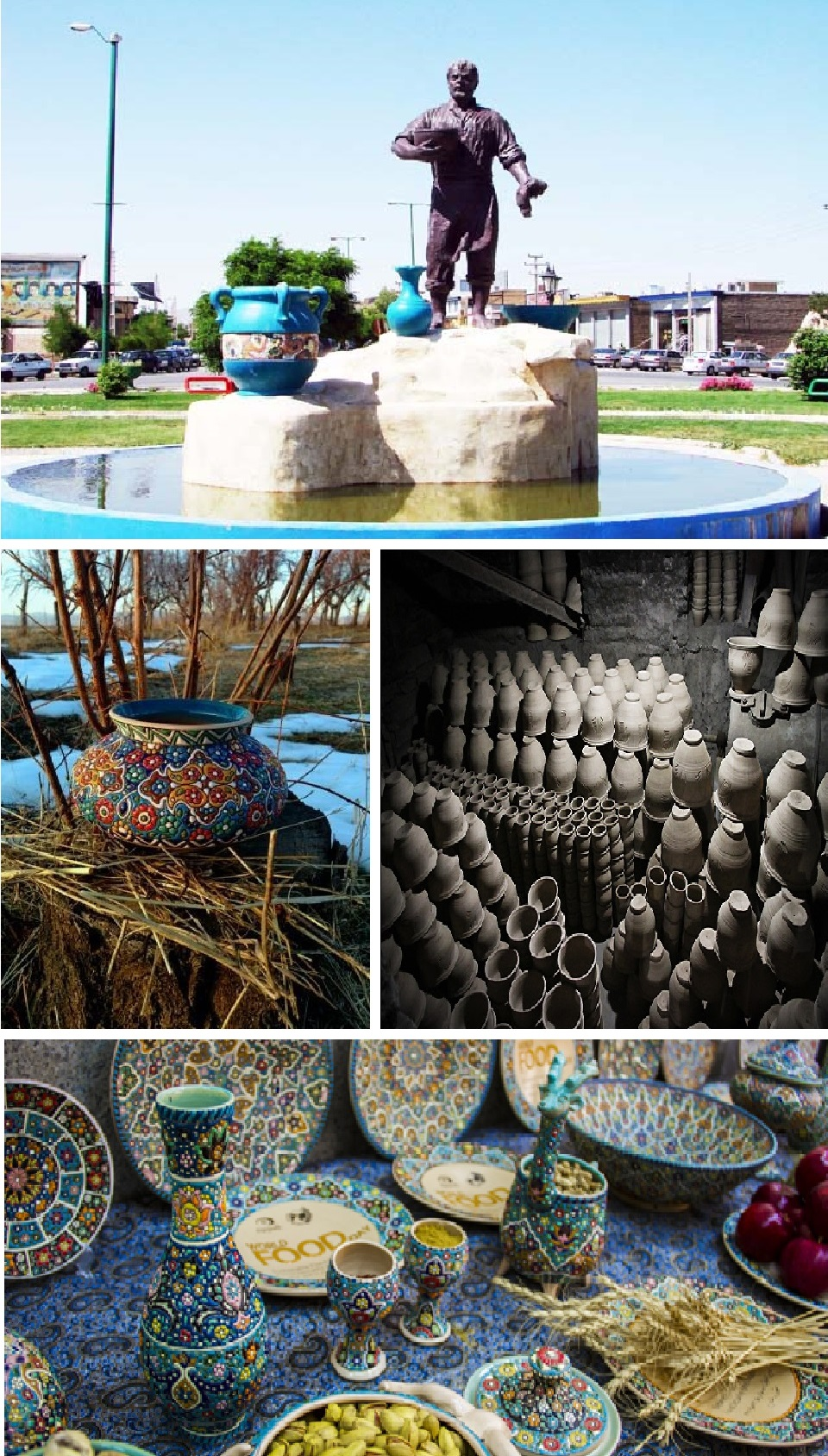

- Location within Iran
- Coordinates: 34°58′27″N 48°28′32″E
- Country: Iran
- Province: Hamadan
- County: Bahar
- District: Lalejin
- Elevation: 1,731 m (5,679 ft)

Population (2016)
  - Total: 14,916
- Time zone: UTC+3:30 (IRST)
- Website: www.lalejincity.ir

Lalejin (Persian: لالجين) (Note: Also romanized as Lālajīn and Lālejīn; known locally as Lalin, also romanized as Lalīn; and also known as Shahr-e Lālejīn; and Azerbaijani: لَلين, romanized as Ləlin (English: Clay)) is a city in, and the capital of, Lalejin District in Bahar County, Hamadan province, Iran.

== Demographics ==
=== Population ===
At the time of the 2006 National Census, the city's population was 14,689 in 3,760 households. The following census in 2011 counted 15,291 people in 4,489 households. The 2016 census measured the population of the city as 14,916 people in 4,715 households.

== Geography ==
Lalejin is 20 kilometres north of Hamadan at an altitude of 1731 meters. It is situated 9 kilometres (5.6 mi) from Bahar, capital of Bahar County.

Lalejin District has an area of 508 square kilometers and had a population of 44,568 in 2006, and 41,383 in 2016. It is in the east of Bahar and is bordered in the west by Hamadan County and in the north by Kabudarahang County and contains Mohajeran and Sofalgaran.

== Sister cities ==
	Country	City
(Italy)	Italy	Faenza

== See also ==
Lalejin travel guide from Wikivoyage
