= Qeydli Bolagh =

Village in Hamadan province, Iran

Qeydli Bolagh Persian: قيدلي بلاغ
- Village
- Location within Iran
- Coordinates: 35°00′55″N 48°17′15″E
- Country: Iran
- Province: Hamadan
- County: Bahar
- District: Salehabad
- Rural District: Deymkaran

Population (2016)
  - Total: 269
- Time zone: UTC+3:30 (IRST)

Qeydli Bolagh (Persian: قيدلي بلاغ) (Note: Also romanized as Qeydlī Bolāgh; also known as Qal‘eh Bulāq, Qaydlī Bolāgh, and Qeydī Bolāgh) is a village in Deymkaran Rural District of Salehabad District in Bahar County, Hamadan province, Iran.

== Demographics ==
=== Population ===
At the time of the 2006 National Census, the village's population was 304 in 73 households. The following census in 2011 counted 263 people in 80 households. The 2016 census measured the population of the village as 269 people in 85 households.
