= Hameh Kasi =

Hameh Kasi (Persian: همه كسي), also rendered as Hamakasi, may refer to:

- Hameh Kasi, Bahar, Hamadan Province
- Hameh Kasi, Hamadan
- Qeshlaq-e Hameh Kasi
