= Darband, Hamadan =

Village in Hamadan province, Iran

Darband Persian: دربند
- Village
- Location within Iran
- Coordinates: 35°06′00″N 48°13′42″E
- Country: Iran
- Province: Hamadan
- County: Bahar
- District: Salehabad
- Rural District: Deymkaran

Population (2016)
  - Total: 210
- Time zone: UTC+3:30 (IRST)

Darband (Persian: دربند) is a village in Deymkaran Rural District of Salehabad District in Bahar County, Hamadan province, Iran.

== Demographics ==
=== Population ===
At the time of the 2006 National Census, the village's population was 257 in 59 households. The following census in 2011 counted 271 people in 70 households. The 2016 census measured the population of the village as 210 people in 60 households.
