= Chowtash =

Village in Hamadan province, Iran

Chowtash Persian: چوتاش
- Village
- Location within Iran
- Coordinates: 34°50′13″N 48°15′07″E
- Country: Iran
- Province: Hamadan
- County: Bahar
- District: Central
- Rural District: Abrumand

Population (2016)
  - Total: 904
- Time zone: UTC+3:30 (IRST)

Chowtash (Persian: چوتاش) (Note: Also romanized as Chootash, Chowtāsh, and Chūtāsh; also known as Chartāsh) is a village in Abrumand Rural District of the Central District in Bahar County, Hamadan province, Iran.

== Demographics ==
=== Population ===
At the time of the 2006 National Census, the village's population was 978 in 195 households. The following census in 2011 counted 871 people in 233 households. The 2016 census measured the population of the village as 904 people in 256 households.
