= Tajiabad =

Tajiabad (Persian: تاجي اباد) may refer to:

- Tajiabad-e Olya, Hamadan Province
- Tajiabad-e Sofla, Hamadan Province
- Tajiabad, South Khorasan
