= Hoseynabad, Bahar =

Village in Hamadan province, Iran

Hoseynabad Persian: حسين اباد
- Village
- Location within Iran
- Coordinates: 35°06′14″N 48°15′04″E
- Country: Iran
- Province: Hamadan
- County: Bahar
- District: Salehabad
- Rural District: Deymkaran

Population (2016)
  - Total: 404
- Time zone: UTC+3:30 (IRST)

Hoseynabad (Persian: حسين اباد) (Note: Also romanized as Hosein Abad and Ḩoseynābād; also known as Ḩoseynābād-e Khodābandehlū and Husainābād) is a village in Deymkaran Rural District of Salehabad District in Bahar County, Hamadan province, Iran.

== Demographics ==
=== Population ===
At the time of the 2006 National Census, the village's population was 601 in 134 households. The following census in 2011 counted 616 people in 139 households. The 2016 census measured the population of the village as 404 people in 126 households.
