= Gushalan =

Village in Hamadan province, Iran

Gushalan Persian: گوشلان
- Village
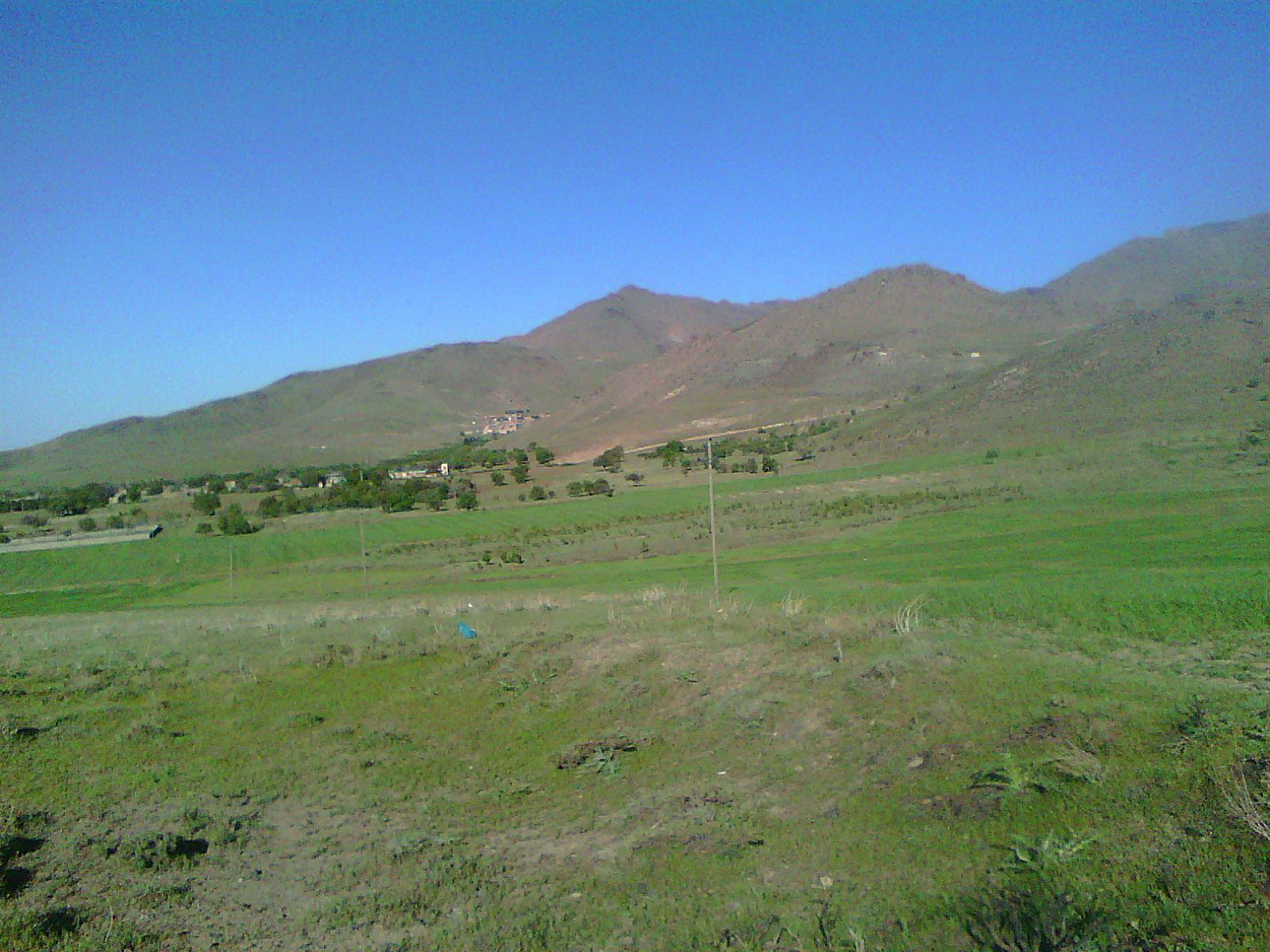
- The village of Gushalan

- Location within Iran
- Coordinates: 34°50′06″N 48°19′21″E
- Country: Iran
- Province: Hamadan
- County: Bahar
- District: Central
- Rural District: Siminehrud

Population (2016)
  - Total: 200
- Time zone: UTC+3:30 (IRST)

Gushalan (Persian: گوشلان) (Note: Also romanized as Gooshlan, Gūshalān, Gūshelān, and Gūshlān) is a village in Siminehrud Rural District of the Central District in Bahar County, Hamadan province, Iran.

== Demographics ==
=== Population ===
At the time of the 2006 National Census, the village's population was 277 in 59 households. The following census in 2011 counted 262 people in 70 households. The 2016 census measured the population of the village as 200 people in 65 households.
