= Simin-e Zagheh =

Village in Hamadan province, Iran

Simin-e Zagheh Persian: سيمين زاغه
- Village
- Location within Iran
- Coordinates: 34°52′36″N 48°19′16″E
- Country: Iran
- Province: Hamadan
- County: Bahar
- District: Central
- Rural District: Siminehrud

Population (2016)
  - Total: 1,653
- Time zone: UTC+3:30 (IRST)

Simin-e Zagheh (Persian: سيمين زاغه) (Note: Also romanized as Sīmīn Zāgheh and Sīmīn-e Zāgheh; also known as Simīr-e Zāgheh) is a village in Siminehrud Rural District of the Central District in Bahar County, Hamadan province, Iran.

== Demographics ==
=== Population ===
At the time of the 2006 National Census, the village's population was 1,428 in 388 households. The following census in 2011 counted 1,644 people in 500 households. The 2016 census measured the population of the village as 1,653 people in 534 households.
