= Khalil Kord =

Village in Hamadan province, Iran

Khalil Kord Persian: خليل كرد
- Village
- Location within Iran
- Coordinates: 34°58′41″N 48°15′11″E
- Country: Iran
- Province: Hamadan
- County: Bahar
- District: Salehabad
- Rural District: Salehabad

Population (2016)
  - Total: 493
- Time zone: UTC+3:30 (IRST)

Khalil Kord (Persian: خليل كرد) (Note: Also romanized as Khalīl Kord; also known as Khalīl Gerd) is a village in Salehabad Rural District of Salehabad District in Bahar County, Hamadan province, Iran.

== Demographics ==
=== Population ===
At the time of the 2006 National Census, the village's population was 730 in 196 households. The following census in 2011 counted 600 people in 168 households. The 2016 census measured the population of the village as 493 people in 169 households.
