= Sari Qamish, Hamadan =

Village in Hamadan province, Iran

Sari Qamish Persian: ساري قميش
- Village
- Location within Iran
- Coordinates: 35°05′00″N 48°28′01″E
- Country: Iran
- Province: Hamadan
- County: Bahar
- District: Lalejin
- Rural District: Sofalgaran

Population (2016)
  - Total: 108
- Time zone: UTC+3:30 (IRST)

Sari Qamish (Persian: ساري قميش) (Note: Also romanized as Sārī Qamīsh; also known as Sar Mīsh, Sari Ghamish, and Sarqmesh) is a village in Sofalgaran Rural District of Lalejin District in Bahar County, Hamadan province, Iran.

== Demographics ==
=== Population ===
At the time of the 2006 National Census, the village's population was 166 in 40 households. The following census in 2011 counted 136 people in 35 households. The 2016 census measured the population of the village as 108 people in 35 households.
