= Dastjerd, Bahar =

Village in Hamadan province, Iran

Dastjerd Persian: دستجرد
- Village
- Location within Iran
- Coordinates: 35°00′31″N 48°31′34″E
- Country: Iran
- Province: Hamadan
- County: Bahar
- District: Lalejin
- Rural District: Mohajeran

Population (2016)
  - Total: 2,955
- Time zone: UTC+3:30 (IRST)

Dastjerd (Persian: دستجرد) (Note: Also known as Dasteh Jerd, Dast-ī-Jīrd, and Dastjerd Chahār Bolook) is a village in Mohajeran Rural District of Lalejin District in Bahar County, Hamadan province, Iran.

== Demographics ==
=== Population ===
At the time of the 2006 National Census, the village's population was 2,907 in 695 households. The following census in 2011 counted 3,068 people in 906 households. The 2016 census measured the population of the village as 2,955 people in 941 households, the most populous in its rural district.
