= Chayan, Bahar =

Village in Hamadan province, Iran

Chayan Persian: چايان
- Village
- Location within Iran
- Coordinates: 34°51′33″N 48°24′05″E
- Country: Iran
- Province: Hamadan
- County: Bahar
- District: Central
- Rural District: Siminehrud

Population (2016)
  - Total: 0
- Time zone: UTC+3:30 (IRST)

Chayan (Persian: چايان) (Note: Also romanized as Chāyān) is a village in Siminehrud Rural District of the Central District in Bahar County, Hamadan province, Iran.

== Demographics ==
=== Population ===
At the time of the 2006 National Census, the village's population was 145 in 75 households. The following census in 2011 counted 20 people in six households. The 2016 census measured the population of the village as zero.
