= Ravan, Hamadan =

Village in Hamadan province, Iran

Ravan Persian: روان
- Village
- Location within Iran
- Coordinates: 34°52′53″N 48°17′48″E
- Country: Iran
- Province: Hamadan
- County: Bahar
- District: Central
- Rural District: Abrumand

Population (2016)
  - Total: 1,371
- Time zone: UTC+3:30 (IRST)

Ravan (Persian: روان) (Note: Also romanized as Ravān) is a village in Abrumand Rural District of the Central District in Bahar County, Hamadan province, Iran.

== Demographics ==
=== Population ===
At the time of the 2006 National Census, the village's population was 1,236 in 248 households. The following census in 2011 counted 1,379 people in 330 households. The 2016 census measured the population of the village as 1,371 people in 373 households.
