= Parluk =

Village in Hamadan province, Iran

Parluk Persian: پرلوك
- Village
- Location within Iran
- Coordinates: 35°03′57″N 48°14′48″E
- Country: Iran
- Province: Hamadan
- County: Bahar
- District: Salehabad
- Rural District: Deymkaran

Population (2016)
  - Total: 2,020
- Time zone: UTC+3:30 (IRST)

Parluk (Persian: پرلوك) (Note: Also romanized as Parlūk and Por Lūk; also known as Parlek, Pīr Look and Pīrlūk) is a village in Deymkaran Rural District of Salehabad District in Bahar County, Hamadan province, Iran.

== Demographics ==
=== Population ===
At the time of the 2006 National Census, the village's population was 2,027 in 381 households. The following census in 2011 counted 2,253 people in 549 households. The 2016 census measured the population of the village as 2,020 people in 556 households, the most populous in its rural district.
