= Dahnejerd =

Village in Hamadan province, Iran

Dahnejerd Persian: دهنجرد
- Village
- Location within Iran
- Coordinates: 34°57′58″N 48°30′16″E
- Country: Iran
- Province: Hamadan
- County: Bahar
- District: Lalejin
- Rural District: Sofalgaran

Population (2016)
  - Total: 890
- Time zone: UTC+3:30 (IRST)

Dahnejerd (Persian: دهنجرد) (Note: Also romanized as Dahanjerd; also known as Danjerd) is a village in Sofalgaran Rural District of Lalejin District in Bahar County, Hamadan province, Iran.

== Demographics ==
=== Population ===
At the time of the 2006 National Census, the village's population was 1,019 in 246 households. The following census in 2011 counted 987 people in 261 households. The 2016 census measured the population of the village as 890 people in 268 households.
