= Jahadabad, Hamadan =

Village in Hamadan province, Iran

Jahadabad Persian: جهاداباد
- Village
- Location within Iran
- Coordinates: 35°01′14″N 48°11′21″E
- Country: Iran
- Province: Hamadan
- County: Bahar
- District: Salehabad
- Rural District: Salehabad

Population (2016)
  - Total: 10
- Time zone: UTC+3:30 (IRST)

Jahadabad (Persian: جهاداباد) (Note: Also romanized as Jahādābād; formerly known as Khanabad (خان اباد), also romanized as Khānābād) is a village in Salehabad Rural District of Salehabad District in Bahar County, Hamadan province, Iran.

== Demographics ==
=== Population ===
At the time of the 2006 National Census, the village's population was 89 in 17 households. The following census in 2011 counted 41 people in 12 households. The 2016 census measured the population of the village as 10 people in five households.
