= Harunabad, Hamadan =

Village in Hamadan province, Iran

Harunabad Persian: هارون اباد
- Village
- Location within Iran
- Coordinates: 34°59′44″N 48°23′47″E
- Country: Iran
- Province: Hamadan
- County: Bahar
- District: Lalejin
- Rural District: Sofalgaran

Population (2016)
  - Total: 605
- Time zone: UTC+3:30 (IRST)

Harunabad (Persian: هارون اباد) (Note: Also romanized as Hārūnābād) is a village in Sofalgaran Rural District of Lalejin District in Bahar County, Hamadan province, Iran.

== Demographics ==
=== Population ===
At the time of the 2006 National Census, the village's population was 971 in 192 households. The following census in 2011 counted 827 people in 189 households. The 2016 census measured the population of the village as 605 people in 198 households.
