= Hasan Qeshlaq =

Village in Hamadan province, Iran

Hasan Qeshlaq Persian: حسن قشلاق
- Village
- Location within Iran
- Coordinates: 35°02′50″N 48°19′37″E
- Country: Iran
- Province: Hamadan
- County: Bahar
- District: Salehabad
- Rural District: Deymkaran

Population (2016)
  - Total: 1,191
- Time zone: UTC+3:30 (IRST)

Hasan Qeshlaq (Persian: حسن قشلاق) (Note: Also romanized as Ḩasan Qeshlāq; also known as Hasan Gheshlagh, Ḩasan Qeshlāqī, and Hasan Qishlāqi) is a village in, and the capital of, Deymkaran Rural District in Salehabad District of Bahar County, Hamadan province, Iran.

== Demographics ==
=== Population ===
At the time of the 2006 National Census, the village's population was 1,322 in 299 households. The following census in 2011 counted 1,477 people in 349 households. The 2016 census measured the population of the village as 1,191 people in 371 households.
