= Tazeh Kand, Bahar =

Village in Hamadan province, Iran

Tazeh Kand Persian: تازه كند
- Village
- Location within Iran
- Coordinates: 34°57′32″N 48°25′59″E
- Country: Iran
- Province: Hamadan
- County: Bahar
- District: Lalejin
- Rural District: Sofalgaran

Population (2016)
  - Total: 2,123
- Time zone: UTC+3:30 (IRST)

Tazeh Kand (Persian: تازه كند) (Note: Also romanized as Tāzeh Kand; formerly known as Hesamabad (حسام اباد), also romanized as Ḩesāmābād) is a village in Sofalgaran Rural District of Lalejin District in Bahar County, Hamadan province, Iran.

== Demographics ==
=== Population ===
At the time of the 2006 National Census, the village's population was 2,128 in 552 households. The following census in 2011 counted 2,236 people in 632 households. The 2016 census measured the population of the village as 2,123 people in 653 households.
