= Hoseynabad-e Latgah =

Village in Hamadan province, Iran

Hoseynabad-e Latgah Persian: حسين آباد لتگاه
- Village
- Location within Iran
- Coordinates: 35°01′17″N 48°35′03″E
- Country: Iran
- Province: Hamadan
- County: Bahar
- District: Lalejin
- Rural District: Mohajeran

Population (2016)
  - Total: 805
- Time zone: UTC+3:30 (IRST)

Hoseynabad-e Latgah (Persian: حسين آباد لتگاه) (Note: Also romanized as Ḩoseynābād-e Latgāh; formerly known as Hoseynabad-e Latka (Persian: حسين ابادلتكا), also romanized as Ḩoseynābād-e Latkā; also known as Hosein Abad Chahar Bolook, Ḩoseynābād, Ḩoseynābād-e Kārkhāneh-ye Qand, and Husainābād) is a village in, and the capital of, Mohajeran Rural District in Lalejin District of Bahar County, Hamadan province, Iran.

== Demographics ==
=== Population ===
At the time of the 2006 National Census, the village's population, as Hoseynabad-e Latka, was 991 in 230 households. The following census in 2011 counted 930 people in 262 households. The 2016 census measured the population of the village as 805 people in 247 households, by which time it was listed as Hoseynabad-e Latgah.
