= Akhtachi, Iran =

Village in Hamadan province, Iran

Akhtachi Persian: اختاچی
- Village
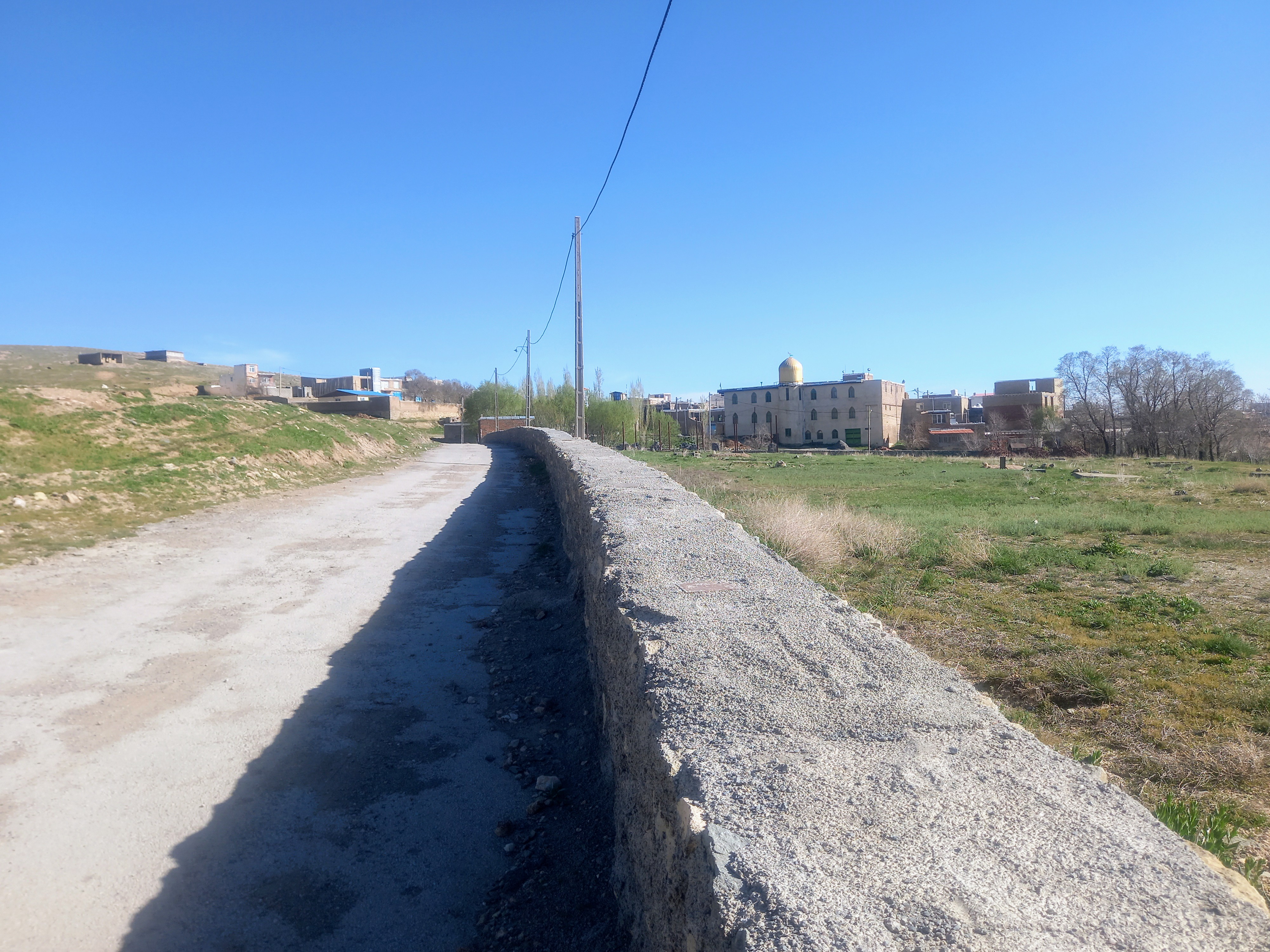
- The village of Akhtachi

- Location within Iran
- Coordinates: 34°54′24″N 48°12′34″E
- Country: Iran
- Province: Hamadan
- County: Bahar
- District: Central
- Rural District: Abrumand

Population (2016)
  - Total: 484
- Time zone: UTC+3:30 (IRST)

Akhtachi (Persian: اختاچی) (Note: Also romanized as Akhtāchī; also known as Akhtaji, Akhtarchi, and Akhtehchī) is a village in Abrumand Rural District of the Central District in Bahar County, Hamadan province, Iran.

== Demographics ==
=== Population ===
At the time of the 2006 National Census, the village's population was 592 in 125 households. The following census in 2011 counted 493 people in 148 households. The 2016 census measured the population of the village as 484 people in 141 households.
