= Nurabad-e Simineh =

Village in Hamadan province, Iran

Nurabad-e Simineh Persian: نورابادسيمينه
- Village
- Location within Iran
- Coordinates: 34°49′19″N 48°17′36″E
- Country: Iran
- Province: Hamadan
- County: Bahar
- District: Central
- Rural District: Siminehrud

Population (2016)
  - Total: 364
- Time zone: UTC+3:30 (IRST)

Nurabad-e Simineh (Persian: نورابادسيمينه) (Note: Also romanized as Nūrābād-e Sīmīneh; formerly known as Darreh Ghūl (دره غول), also romanized as Darreh-ye Ghūl; also known as Darreh Qūl and Nūrābād) is a village in Siminehrud Rural District of the Central District in Bahar County, Hamadan province, Iran.

== Demographics ==
=== Population ===
At the time of the 2006 National Census, the village's population was 434 in 98 households. The following census in 2011 counted 429 people in 113 households. The 2016 census measured the population of the village as 364 people in 107 households.
