= Ab Barik, Bahar =

Village in Hamadan province, Iran

Ab Barik Persian: اب باريك
- Village
- Location within Iran
- Coordinates: 34°53′36″N 48°16′43″E
- Country: Iran
- Province: Hamadan
- County: Bahar
- District: Central
- Rural District: Abrumand

Population (2016)
  - Total: 200
- Time zone: UTC+3:30 (IRST)

Ab Barik (Persian: اب باريك) (Note: Also romanized as Āb Bārīk, Āb-e Bārīk, and Āb-ī-Bārīk) is a village in Abrumand Rural District of the Central District in Bahar County, Hamadan province, Iran.

== Demographics ==
=== Population ===
At the time of the 2006 National Census, the village's population was 198 in 37 households. The following census in 2011 counted 179 people in 54 households. The 2016 census measured the population of the village as 200 people in 57 households.
