= Jamshidabad, Hamadan =

Village in Hamadan province, Iran

Jamshidabad Persian: جمشيداباد
- Village
- Location within Iran
- Coordinates: 35°05′41″N 48°26′40″E
- Country: Iran
- Province: Hamadan
- County: Bahar
- District: Lalejin
- Rural District: Sofalgaran

Population (2016)
  - Total: 143
- Time zone: UTC+3:30 (IRST)

Jamshidabad (Persian: جمشيداباد) (Note: Also romanized as Jamshīdābād) is a village in Sofalgaran Rural District of Lalejin District in Bahar County, Hamadan province, Iran.

== Demographics ==
=== Population ===
At the time of the 2006 National Census, the village's population was 188 in 49 households. The following census in 2011 counted 168 people in 43 households. The 2016 census measured the population of the village as 143 people in 42 households.
