= Hesar-e Qarah Baghi =

Village in Hamadan province, Iran

Hesar-e Qarah Baghi Persian: حصارقره باغي
- Village
- Location within Iran
- Coordinates: 34°49′21″N 48°16′07″E
- Country: Iran
- Province: Hamadan
- County: Bahar
- District: Central
- Rural District: Siminehrud

Population (2016)
  - Total: 910
- Time zone: UTC+3:30 (IRST)

Hesar-e Qarah Baghi (Persian: حصارقره باغي) (Note: Also romanized as Ḩeşār Qareh Bāghī and Ḩeşār-e Qarah Bāghī; also known as Ḩeşār and Ḩeşāri) is a village in Siminehrud Rural District of the Central District in Bahar County, Hamadan province, Iran.

== Demographics ==
=== Population ===
At the time of the 2006 National Census, the village's population was 945 in 197 households. The following census in 2011 counted 1,011 people in 254 households. The 2016 census measured the population of the village as 910 people in 280 households.
