= Gug Tappeh, Hamadan =

Village in Hamadan province, Iran

Gug Tappeh Persian: گوگ تپه
- Village
- Location within Iran
- Coordinates: 35°05′15″N 48°20′30″E
- Country: Iran
- Province: Hamadan
- County: Bahar
- District: Salehabad
- Rural District: Deymkaran

Population (2016)
  - Total: 284
- Time zone: UTC+3:30 (IRST)

Gug Tappeh (Persian: گوگ تپه) (Note: Also romanized as Gowg Tappeh and Gūg Tappeh; also known as Gog Tappeh, Gowk Tappeh, Gūk Tappeh, and Guk Tepe) is a village in Deymkaran Rural District of Salehabad District in Bahar County, Hamadan province, Iran.

== Demographics ==
=== Population ===
At the time of the 2006 National Census, the village's population was 295 in 65 households. The following census in 2011 counted 305 people in 80 households. The 2016 census measured the population of the village as 284 people in 86 households.
