= Lak, Hamadan =

Village in Hamadan province, Iran

Lak Persian: لك
- Village
- Location within Iran
- Coordinates: 35°04′22″N 48°18′28″E
- Country: Iran
- Province: Hamadan
- County: Bahar
- District: Salehabad
- Rural District: Deymkaran

Population (2016)
  - Total: 340
- Time zone: UTC+3:30 (IRST)

Lak (Persian: لك) is a village in Deymkaran Rural District of Salehabad District in Bahar County, Hamadan province, Iran.

== Demographics ==
=== Population ===
At the time of the 2006 National Census, the village's population was 295 in 68 households. The following census in 2011 counted 317 people in 84 households. The 2016 census measured the population of the village as 340 people in 107 households.
