= Hasan Abdal, Iran =

Village in Hamadan province, Iran

Hasan Abdal Persian: حسن ابدال
- Village
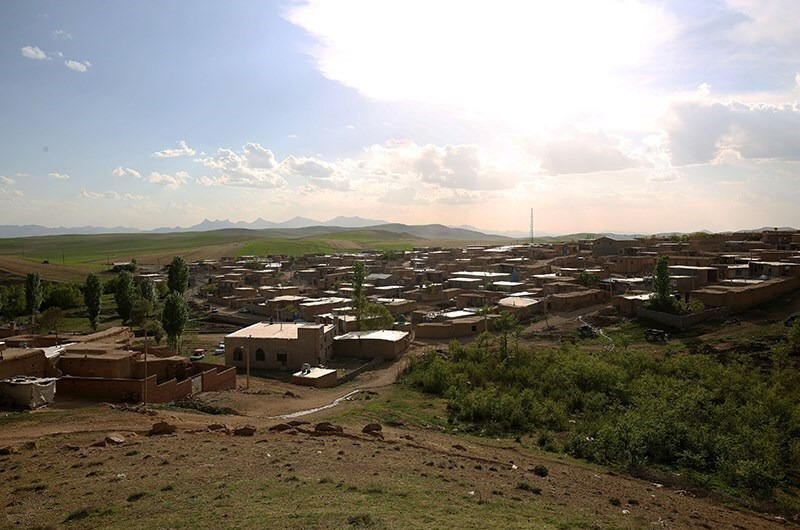
- The village of Hasan Abdal

- Location within Iran
- Coordinates: 35°07′26″N 48°11′28″E
- Country: Iran
- Province: Hamadan
- County: Bahar
- District: Salehabad
- Rural District: Deymkaran

Population (2016)
  - Total: 265
- Time zone: UTC+3:30 (IRST)

Hasan Abdal (Persian: حسن ابدال) (Note: Also romanized as Ḩasan Abdāl) is a village in Deymkaran Rural District of Salehabad District in Bahar County, Hamadan province, Iran.

== Demographics ==
=== Population ===
At the time of the 2006 National Census, the village's population was 485 in 126 households. The following census in 2011 counted 399 people in 105 households. The 2016 census measured the population of the village as 265 people in 90 households.
