= Abrumand =

Village in Hamadan province, Iran

Abrumand Persian: ابرومند
- Village
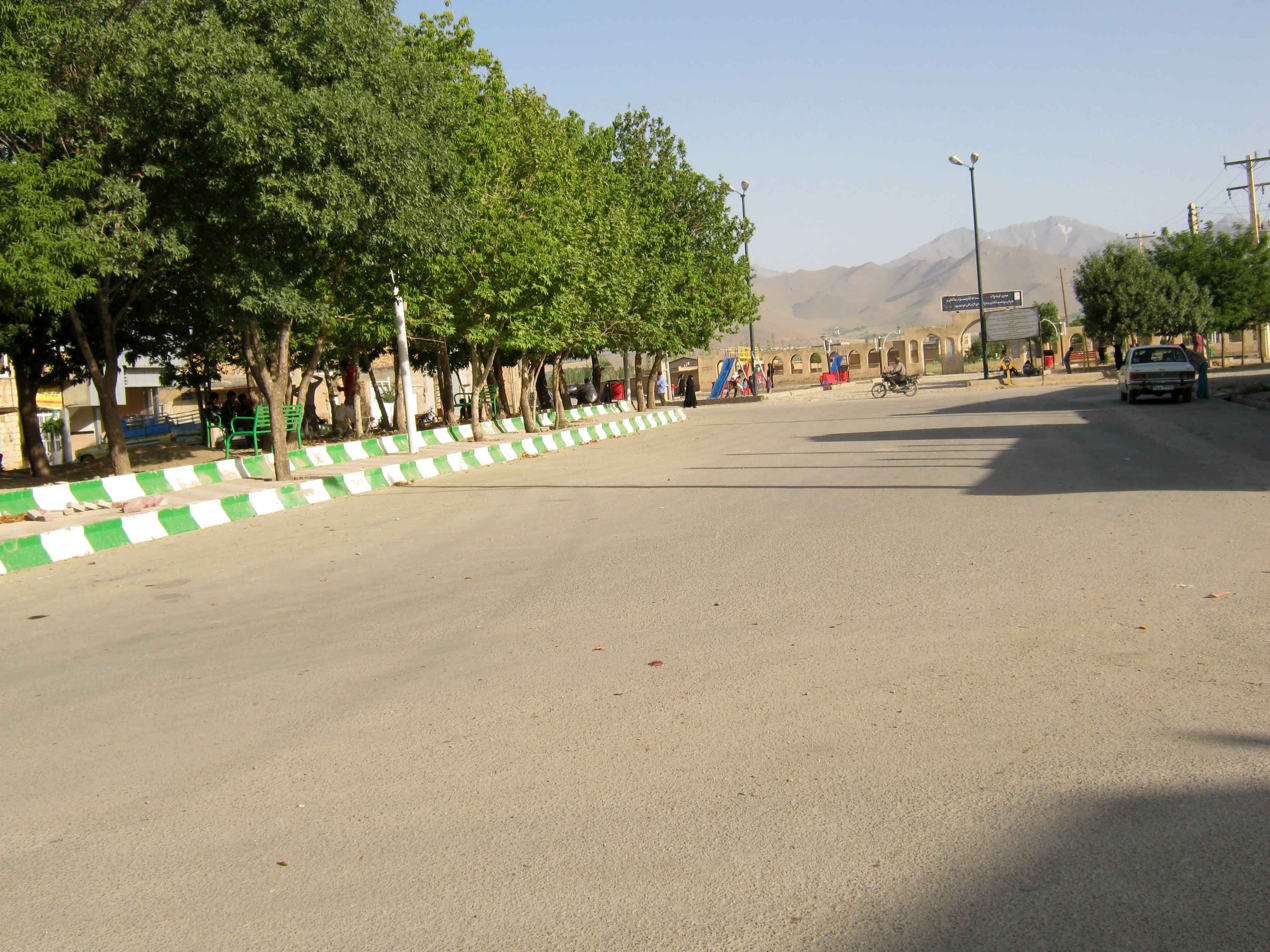
- The village of Abrumand

- Location within Iran
- Coordinates: 34°54′10″N 48°19′19″E
- Country: Iran
- Province: Hamadan
- County: Bahar
- District: Central
- Rural District: Abrumand

Population (2016)
  - Total: 1,745
- Time zone: UTC+3:30 (IRST)

Abrumand (Persian: ابرومند) (Note: Also romanized as Ābrūmand; formerly known as Arzumand (آرزومند); also known as Ārūmand) is a village in, and the capital of, Abrumand Rural District in the Central District of Bahar County, Hamadan province, Iran. It was the capital of Siminehrud Rural District until its capital was transferred to the village of Zagheh.

== Demographics ==
=== Population ===
At the time of the 2006 National Census, the village's population was 1,637 in 419 households. The following census in 2011 counted 1,874 people in 487 households. The 2016 census measured the population of the village as 1,745 people in 523 households.
