= Sang-e Sefid, Bahar =

Village in Hamadan province, Iran

Sang-e Sefid Persian: سنگ سفيد
- Village
- Location within Iran
- Coordinates: 34°51′45″N 48°16′57″E
- Country: Iran
- Province: Hamadan
- County: Bahar
- District: Central
- Rural District: Abrumand

Population (2016)
  - Total: 756
- Time zone: UTC+3:30 (IRST)

Sang-e Sefid (Persian: سنگ سفيد) (Note: Also romanized as Sang Sefīd, Sang-e Safīd, Sang-e Sefīd, and Sang-i-Safīd) is a village in Abrumand Rural District of the Central District in Bahar County, Hamadan province, Iran.

== Demographics ==
=== Population ===
At the time of the 2006 National Census, the village's population was 780 in 162 households. The following census in 2011 counted 827 people in 213 households. The 2016 census measured the population of the village as 756 people in 204 households.
