= Gonbadan, Hamadan =

Village in Hamadan province, Iran

Gonbadan Persian: گنبدان
- Village
- Location within Iran
- Coordinates: 35°04′12″N 48°22′57″E
- Country: Iran
- Province: Hamadan
- County: Bahar
- District: Lalejin
- Rural District: Sofalgaran

Population (2016)
  - Total: 1,301
- Time zone: UTC+3:30 (IRST)

Gonbadan (Persian: گنبدان) (Note: Also romanized as Gonbadān) is a village in Sofalgaran Rural District of Lalejin District in Bahar County, Hamadan province, Iran.

== Demographics ==
=== Population ===
At the time of the 2006 National Census, the village's population was 1,233 in 249 households. The following census in 2011 counted 1,159 people in 296 households. The 2016 census measured the population of the village as 1,301 people in 381 households.
