= Mirza Hesari =

Village in Hamadan province, Iran

Mirza Hesari Persian: ميرزاحصاري
- Village
- Location within Iran
- Coordinates: 35°07′41″N 48°27′31″E
- Country: Iran
- Province: Hamadan
- County: Bahar
- District: Lalejin
- Rural District: Sofalgaran

Population (2016)
  - Total: 545
- Time zone: UTC+3:30 (IRST)

Mirza Hesari (Persian: ميرزاحصاري) (Note: Also romanized as Mīrzā Ḩeşārī) is a village in Sofalgaran Rural District of Lalejin District in Bahar County, Hamadan province, Iran.

== Demographics ==
=== Population ===
At the time of the 2006 National Census, the village's population was 542 in 109 households. The following census in 2011 counted 568 people in 136 households. The 2016 census measured the population of the village as 545 people in 171 households.
