= Deh Now, Bahar =

Village in Hamadan province, Iran

Deh Now Persian: ده نو
- Village
- Location within Iran
- Coordinates: 34°51′54″N 48°12′17″E
- Country: Iran
- Province: Hamadan
- County: Bahar
- District: Central
- Rural District: Abrumand

Population (2016)
  - Total: 114
- Time zone: UTC+3:30 (IRST)

Deh Now (Persian: ده نو) (Note: Also known as Tāzeh Kand) is a village in Abrumand Rural District of the Central District in Bahar County, Hamadan province, Iran.

== Demographics ==
=== Population ===
At the time of the 2006 National Census, the village's population was 153 in 42 households. The following census in 2011 counted 118 people in 35 households. The 2016 census measured the population of the village as 114 people in 33 households.
