= Karimabad, Bahar =

Village in Hamadan province, Iran

Karimabad Persian: كريم اباد
- Village
- Location within Iran
- Coordinates: 34°57′46″N 48°21′25″E
- Country: Iran
- Province: Hamadan
- County: Bahar
- District: Salehabad
- Rural District: Salehabad

Population (2016)
  - Total: 1,717
- Time zone: UTC+3:30 (IRST)

Karimabad (Persian: كريم اباد) (Note: Also romanized as Karīmābād) is a village in Salehabad Rural District of Salehabad District in Bahar County, Hamadan province, Iran.

== Demographics ==
=== Population ===
At the time of the 2006 National Census, the village's population was 1,452 in 262 households. The following census in 2011 counted 1,631 people in 391 households. The 2016 census measured the population of the village as 1,717 people in 464 households.
