= Kushkabad, Hamadan =

Village in Hamadan province, Iran

Kushkabad Persian: كوشك اباد
- Village
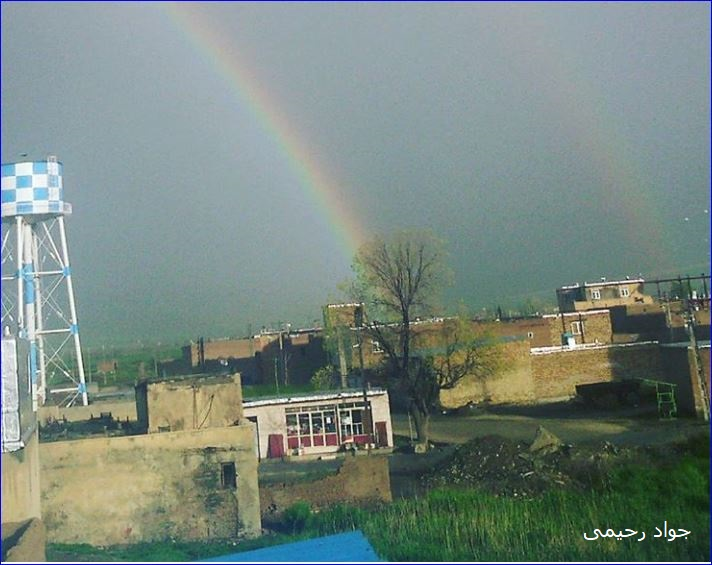
- The village of Kushkabad

- Location within Iran
- Coordinates: 35°02′31″N 48°33′53″E
- Country: Iran
- Province: Hamadan
- County: Bahar
- District: Lalejin
- Rural District: Mohajeran

Population (2016)
  - Total: 1,592
- Time zone: UTC+3:30 (IRST)

Kushkabad (Persian: كوشك اباد) (Note: Also romanized as Kooshk Abad and Kūshkābād) is a village in Mohajeran Rural District of Lalejin District in Bahar County, Hamadan province, Iran.

== Demographics ==
=== Population ===
At the time of the 2006 National Census, the village's population was 1,618 in 368 households. The following census in 2011 counted 1,702 people in 421 households. The 2016 census measured the population of the village as 1,592 people in 485 households.
