= Cheshmeh Kabud, Bahar =

Village in Hamadan province, Iran

Cheshmeh Kabud Persian: چشمه كبود
- Village
- Location within Iran
- Coordinates: 34°55′04″N 48°14′54″E
- Country: Iran
- Province: Hamadan
- County: Bahar
- District: Central
- Rural District: Abrumand

Population (2016)
  - Total: 26
- Time zone: UTC+3:30 (IRST)

Cheshmeh Kabud (Persian: چشمه كبود) (Note: Also romanized as Chashmeh Kabūd and Cheshmeh Kabūd; also known as Cheshmeh Kubūd) is a village in Abrumand Rural District of the Central District in Bahar County, Hamadan province, Iran.

== Demographics ==
=== Population ===
At the time of the 2006 National Census, the village's population was 44 in 12 households. The following census in 2011 counted 12 people in four households. The 2016 census measured the population of the village as 26 people in eight households.
