= Vahnan =

Village in Hamadan province, Iran

Vahnan Persian: وهنان
- Village
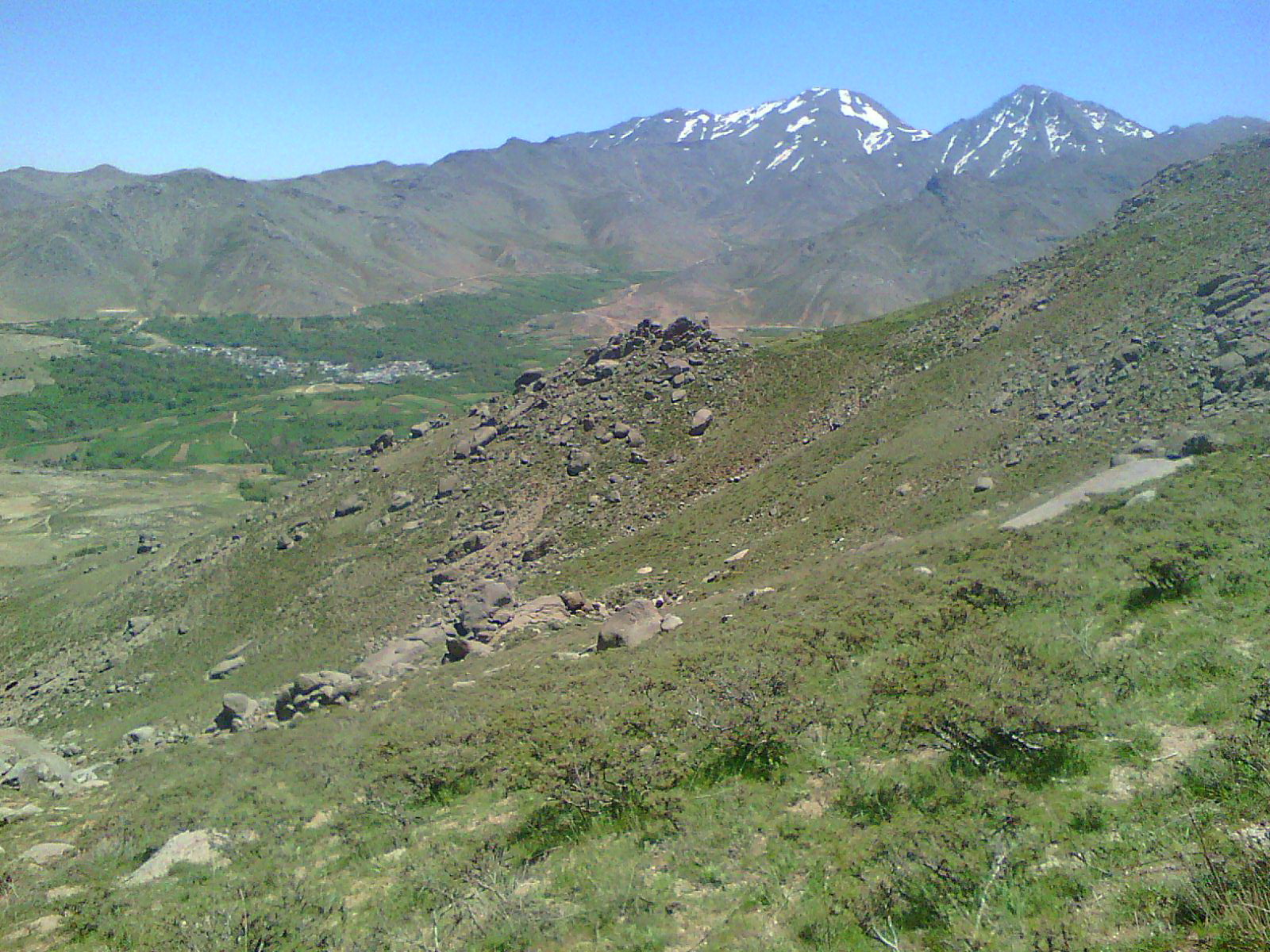
- Landscape near the village of Vahnan

- Location within Iran
- Coordinates: 34°47′26″N 48°17′20″E
- Country: Iran
- Province: Hamadan
- County: Bahar
- District: Central
- Rural District: Siminehrud

Population (2016)
  - Total: 1,180
- Time zone: UTC+3:30 (IRST)

Vahnan (Persian: وهنان) (Note: Also romanized as Vahnān and Vehnān) is a village in Siminehrud Rural District of the Central District in Bahar County, Hamadan province, Iran.

== Demographics ==
=== Population ===
At the time of the 2006 National Census, the village's population was 1,363 in 299 households. The following census in 2011 counted 1,373 people in 367 households. The 2016 census measured the population of the village as 1,180 people in 343 households.
