= Fasijan =

Village in Hamadan province, Iran

Fasijan Persian: فسيجان
- Village
- Location within Iran
- Coordinates: 34°50′12″N 48°18′17″E
- Country: Iran
- Province: Hamadan
- County: Bahar
- District: Central
- Rural District: Siminehrud

Population (2016)
  - Total: 500
- Time zone: UTC+3:30 (IRST)

Fasijan (Persian: فسيجان) (Note: Also romanized as Fasījān and Fesījān; also known as Pīsījān) is a village in Siminehrud Rural District of the Central District in Bahar County, Hamadan province, Iran.

== Demographics ==
=== Population ===
At the time of the 2006 National Census, the village's population was 627 in 154 households. The following census in 2011 counted 666 people in 177 households. The 2016 census measured the population of the village as 500 people in 149 households.
