= Khashab =

Khashab (Persian: خشاب) may refer to:

- Khashab, Bushehr
- Khashab, Andimeshk, Khuzestan Province
- Khashab, Shadegan, Khuzestan Province

== See also ==
- Khoshab (disambiguation)
