= Gomush Bolagh =

Village in Hamadan province, Iran

Gomush Bolagh Persian: گموش بلاغ
- Village
- Location within Iran
- Coordinates: 34°55′55″N 48°17′24″E
- Country: Iran
- Province: Hamadan
- County: Bahar
- District: Salehabad
- Rural District: Salehabad

Population (2016)
  - Total: 223
- Time zone: UTC+3:30 (IRST)

Gomush Bolagh (Persian: گموش بلاغ) (Note: Also romanized as Gomūsh Bolāgh; also known as Gomesh Bolāgh and Komesh Bolāgh) is a village in Salehabad Rural District of Salehabad District in Bahar County, Hamadan province, Iran.

== Demographics ==
=== Population ===
At the time of the 2006 National Census, the village's population was 319 in 79 households. The following census in 2011 counted 279 people in 72 households. The 2016 census measured the population of the village as 223 people in 72 households.
