= Eslamabad, Bahar =

Village in Hamadan province, Iran

Eslamabad Persian: اسلام آباد
- Village
- Location within Iran
- Coordinates: 35°07′49″N 48°14′00″E
- Country: Iran
- Province: Hamadan
- County: Bahar
- District: Salehabad
- Rural District: Deymkaran

Population (2016)
  - Total: 162
- Time zone: UTC+3:30 (IRST)

Eslamabad (Persian: اسلام آباد) (Note: Also romanized as Eslāmābād; also known as Dowlatābād (دولت آباد)) is a village in Deymkaran Rural District of Salehabad District in Bahar County, Hamadan province, Iran.

== Demographics ==
=== Population ===
At the time of the 2006 National Census, the village's population was 303 in 76 households. The following census in 2011 counted 229 people in 64 households. The 2016 census measured the population of the village as 162 people in 59 households.
