= Pahneh Bar, Hamadan =

Village in Hamadan province, Iran

Pahneh Bar Persian: پهنه بر
- Village
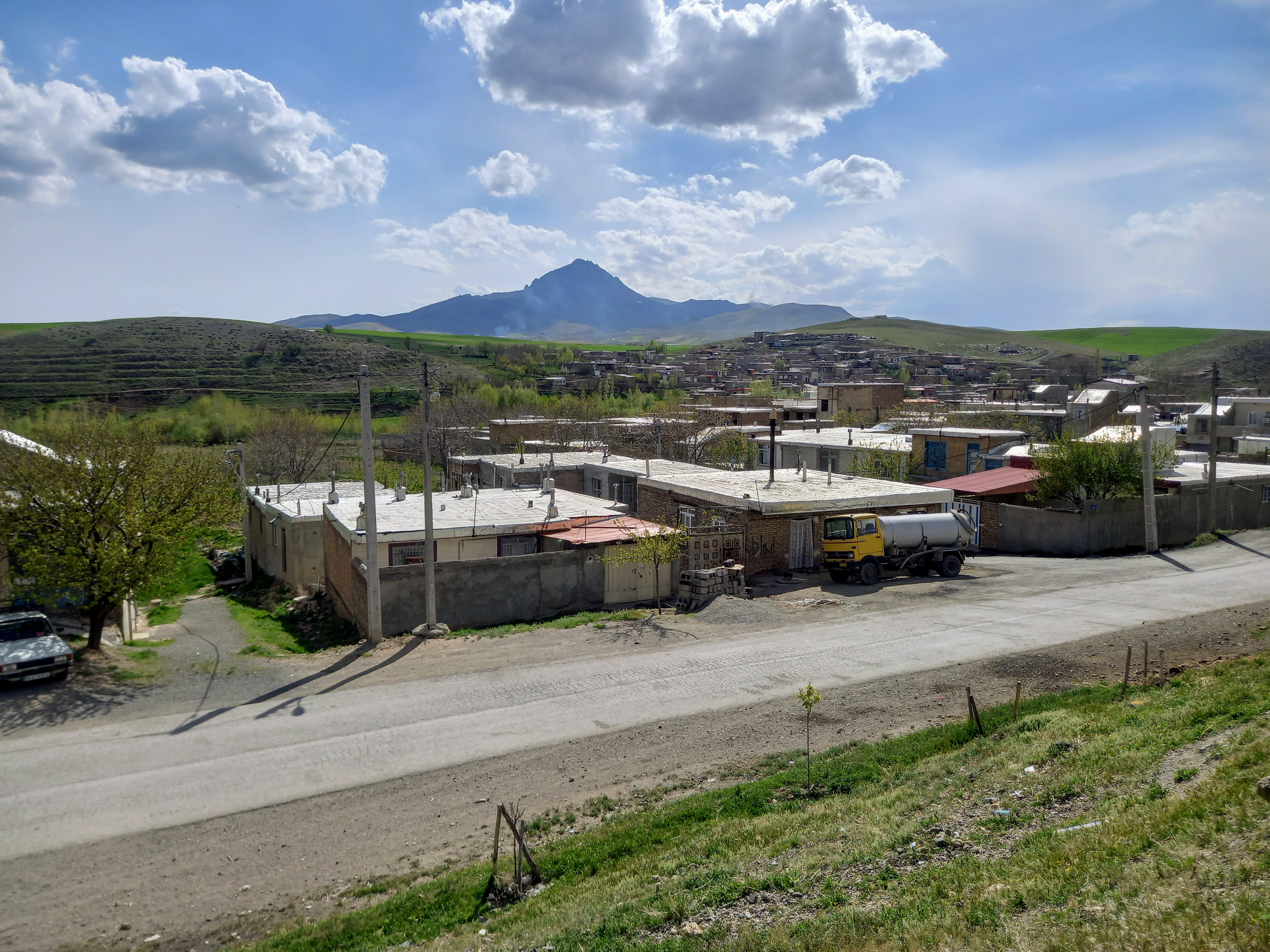
- The village of Pahneh Bar in April 2025

- Location within Iran
- Coordinates: 34°57′17″N 48°14′22″E
- Country: Iran
- Province: Hamadan
- County: Bahar
- District: Salehabad
- Rural District: Salehabad

Population (2016)
  - Total: 793
- Time zone: UTC+3:30 (IRST)

Pahneh Bar (Persian: پهنه بر) is a village in Salehabad Rural District of Salehabad District in Bahar County, Hamadan province, Iran.

== Demographics ==
=== Population ===
At the time of the 2006 National Census, the village's population was 825 in 176 households. The following census in 2011 counted 845 people in 228 households. The 2016 census measured the population of the village as 793 people in 242 households.
