= Latgah =

Village in Hamadan province, Iran

Latgah Persian: لتگاه
- Village
- Location within Iran
- Coordinates: 34°59′25″N 48°32′40″E
- Country: Iran
- Province: Hamadan
- County: Bahar
- District: Lalejin
- Rural District: Mohajeran

Population (2016)
  - Total: 1,844
- Time zone: UTC+3:30 (IRST)

Latgah (Persian: لتگاه) (Note: Also romanized as Latgāh; also known as Labtgāh, Latgā’, Latjāh, and Les̄gā’) is a village in Mohajeran Rural District of Lalejin District in Bahar County, Hamadan province, Iran.

== Demographics ==
=== Population ===
At the time of the 2006 National Census, the village's population was 1,973 in 535 households. The following census in 2011 counted 1,934 people in 577 households. The 2016 census measured the population of the village as 1,844 people in 553 households.
