= Mihamleh =

Mihamleh (Persian: ميهمله) may refer to:

- Mihamleh-ye Olya
- Mihamleh-ye Sofla
