= Aq Kahriz, Hamadan =

Village in Hamadan province, Iran

Aq Kahriz Persian: اق كهريز
- Village
- Location within Iran
- Coordinates: 34°59′34″N 48°19′57″E
- Country: Iran
- Province: Hamadan
- County: Bahar
- District: Salehabad
- Rural District: Salehabad

Population (2016)
  - Total: 490
- Time zone: UTC+3:30 (IRST)

Aq Kahriz (Persian: اق كهريز) (Note: Also romanized as Āq Kahrīz and Āqkahrīz; formerly known as Aghcheh Kharabeh (اغچه خرابه), also romanized as Āghcheh Kharābeh) is a village in Salehabad Rural District of Salehabad District in Bahar County, Hamadan province, Iran.

== Demographics ==
=== Population ===
At the time of the 2006 National Census, the village's population was 552 in 120 households. The following census in 2011 counted 461 people in 125 households. The 2016 census measured the population of the village as 490 people in 140 households.
