= Akbarabad, Bahar =

Village in Hamadan province, Iran

Akbarabad Persian: اكبراباد بحري
- Village
- Location within Iran
- Coordinates: 35°04′40″N 48°16′28″E
- Country: Iran
- Province: Hamadan
- County: Bahar
- District: Salehabad
- Rural District: Deymkaran

Population (2016)
  - Total: 76
- Time zone: UTC+3:30 (IRST)

Akbarabad (Persian: اكبراباد) (Note: Also romanized as Akbarābād) is a village in Deymkaran Rural District of Salehabad District in Bahar County, Hamadan province, Iran.

== Demographics ==
=== Population ===
At the time of the 2006 National Census, the village's population was 80 in 18 households. The following census in 2011 counted 76 people in 24 households. The 2016 census measured the population of the village as 76 people in 25 households.
