= Sarbanlar, Hamadan =

Village in Hamadan province, Iran

Sarbanlar Persian: ساربانلر
- Village
- Location within Iran
- Coordinates: 35°00′05″N 48°16′11″E
- Country: Iran
- Province: Hamadan
- County: Bahar
- District: Salehabad
- Rural District: Salehabad

Population (2016)
  - Total: 342
- Time zone: UTC+3:30 (IRST)

Sarbanlar (Persian: ساربانلر) (Note: Also romanized as Sārbānlar) is a village in Salehabad Rural District of Salehabad District in Bahar County, Hamadan province, Iran.

== Demographics ==
=== Population ===
At the time of the 2006 National Census, the village's population was 421 in 104 households. The following census in 2011 counted 390 people in 111 households. The 2016 census measured the population of the village as 342 people in 107 households.
