= Dinarabad, Hamadan =

Village in Hamadan province, Iran

Dinarabad Persian: ديناراباد
- Village
- Location within Iran
- Coordinates: 34°57′21″N 48°27′44″E
- Country: Iran
- Province: Hamadan
- County: Bahar
- District: Lalejin
- Rural District: Sofalgaran

Population (2016)
  - Total: 2,300
- Time zone: UTC+3:30 (IRST)

Dinarabad (Persian: ديناراباد) (Note: Also romanized as Dīnārābād; also known as Dandarābād and Dindarābād) is a village in, and the capital of, Sofalgaran Rural District in Lalejin District of Bahar County, Hamadan province, Iran.

== Demographics ==
=== Population ===
At the time of the 2006 National Census, the village's population was 2,142 in 491 households. The following census in 2011 counted 2,416 people in 625 households. The 2016 census measured the population of the village as 2,300 people in 664 households. It was the most populous village in its rural district.
