= Soleymanabad, Hamadan =

Village in Hamadan province, Iran

Soleymanabad Persian: سليمان اباد
- Village
- Location within Iran
- Coordinates: 34°59′16″N 48°31′42″E
- Country: Iran
- Province: Hamadan
- County: Bahar
- District: Lalejin
- Rural District: Mohajeran

Population (2016)
  - Total: 590
- Time zone: UTC+3:30 (IRST)

Soleymanabad (Persian: سليمان اباد) (Note: Also romanized as Soleymānābād) is a village in Mohajeran Rural District of Lalejin District in Bahar County, Hamadan province, Iran.

== Demographics ==
=== Population ===
At the time of the 2006 National Census, the village's population was 672 in 158 households. The following census in 2011 counted 663 people in 175 households. The 2016 census measured the population of the village as 590 people in 173 households.
