= Rah Hamvar =

Village in Hamadan province, Iran

Rah Hamvar Persian: راه هموار
- Village
- Location within Iran
- Coordinates: 35°03′01″N 48°37′24″E
- Country: Iran
- Province: Hamadan
- County: Bahar
- District: Lalejin
- Rural District: Mohajeran

Population (2016)
  - Total: 1,314
- Time zone: UTC+3:30 (IRST)

Rah Hamvar (Persian: راه هموار) (Note: Also romanized as Rāh Hamvār; formerly known as Marhamvar (مارهموار), also romanized as Mārhamvār) is a village in Mohajeran Rural District of Lalejin District in Bahar County, Hamadan province, Iran.

== Demographics ==
=== Population ===
At the time of the 2006 National Census, the village's population was 1,403 in 273 households. The following census in 2011 counted 1,389 people in 317 households. The 2016 census measured the population of the village as 1,314 people in 393 households.
