= Qarah Aghaj, Hamadan =

Village in Hamadan province, Iran

Qarah Aghaj Persian: قره اغاج
- Village
- Location within Iran
- Coordinates: 35°03′03″N 48°17′50″E
- Country: Iran
- Province: Hamadan
- County: Bahar
- District: Salehabad
- Rural District: Deymkaran

Population (2016)
  - Total: 547
- Time zone: UTC+3:30 (IRST)

Qarah Aghaj (Persian: قره اغاج) (Note: Also romanized as Qarah Āghāj and Qareh Āghāj; also known as Ghareh Aghaj, Qaraghāch, Qarah Āqāj, and Qareh Āqāj) is a village in Deymkaran Rural District of Salehabad District in Bahar County, Hamadan province, Iran.

== Demographics ==
=== Population ===
At the time of the 2006 National Census, the village's population was 517 in 111 households. The following census in 2011 counted 584 people in 134 households. The 2016 census measured the population of the village as 547 people in 133 households.
