= Aq Bolagh-e Latgah =

Village in Hamadan province, Iran

Aq Bolagh-e Latgah Persian: اقبلاغ لتگاه
- Village
- Location within Iran
- Coordinates: 34°59′04″N 48°33′19″E
- Country: Iran
- Province: Hamadan
- County: Bahar
- District: Lalejin
- Rural District: Mohajeran

Population (2016)
  - Total: 611
- Time zone: UTC+3:30 (IRST)

Aq Bolagh-e Latgah (Persian: اقبلاغ لتگاه) (Note: Also romanized as Āq Bolāgh-e Latgāh; also known as Āq Bolāgh) is a village in Mohajeran Rural District of Lalejin District in Bahar County, Hamadan province, Iran.

== Demographics ==
=== Population ===
At the time of the 2006 National Census, the village's population was 760 in 193 households. The following census in 2011 counted 715 people in 207 households. The 2016 census measured the population of the village as 611 people in 187 households.
