= Robat-e Zafarani =

Village in Hamadan province, Iran

Robat-e Zafarani Persian: رباط زعفراني
- Village
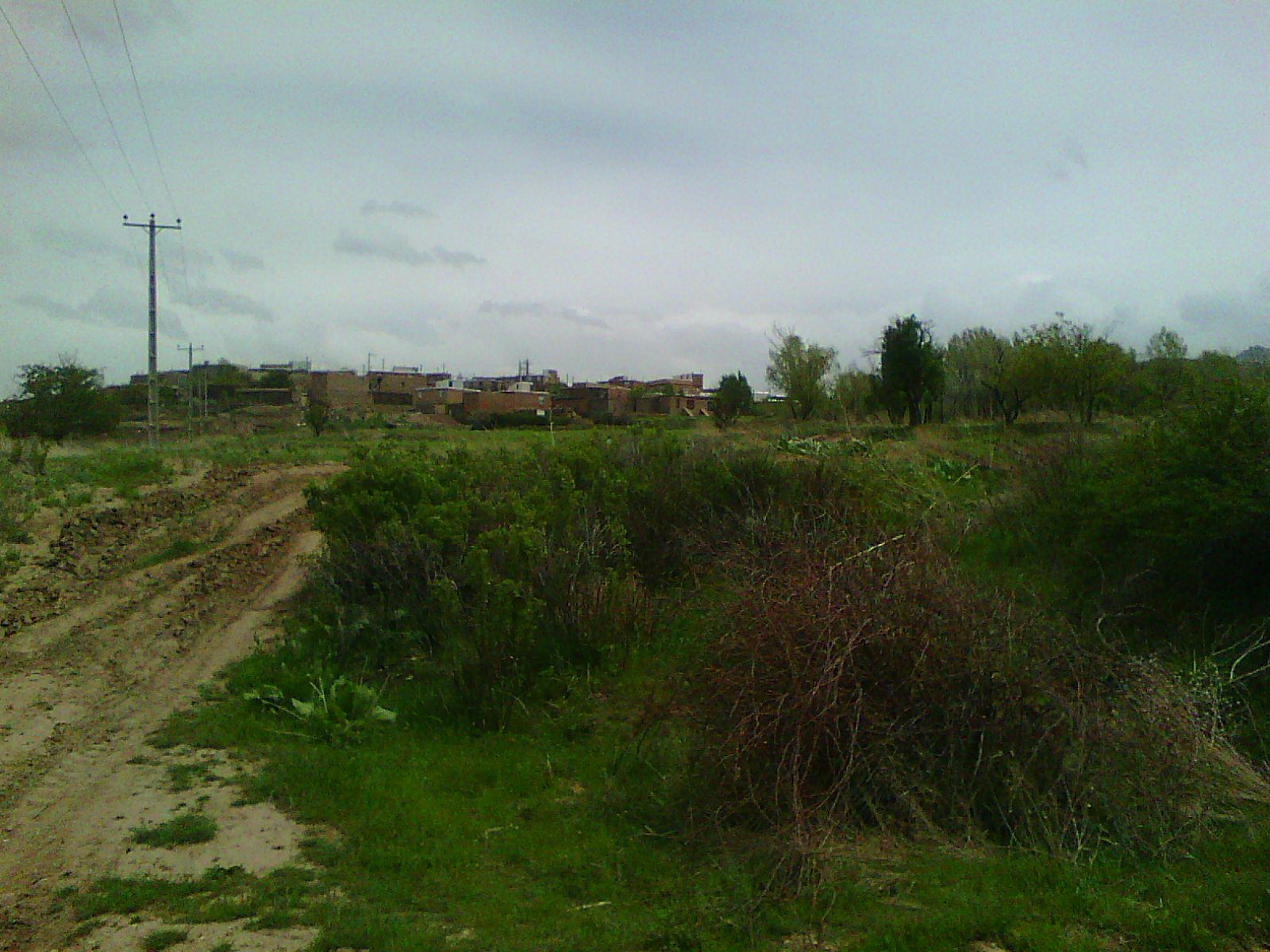
- The village of Robat-e Zafarani

- Location within Iran
- Coordinates: 34°51′49″N 48°20′14″E
- Country: Iran
- Province: Hamadan
- County: Bahar
- District: Central
- Rural District: Siminehrud

Population (2016)
  - Total: 1,028
- Time zone: UTC+3:30 (IRST)

Robat-e Zafarani (Persian: رباط زعفراني) (Note: Also romanized as Robāţ Za‘farānī and Robāţ-e Za‘farānī) is a village in Siminehrud Rural District of the Central District in Bahar County, Hamadan province, Iran.

== Demographics ==
=== Population ===
At the time of the 2006 National Census, the village's population was 1,004 in 272 households. The following census in 2011 counted 1,159 people in 305 households. The 2016 census measured the population of the village as 1,028 people in 329 households.
