= Malek-e Ashtar =

Village in Hamadan province, Iran

Malek-e Ashtar Persian: مالك اشتر
- Village
- Location within Iran
- Coordinates: 34°57′10″N 48°18′56″E
- Country: Iran
- Province: Hamadan
- County: Bahar
- District: Salehabad
- Rural District: Salehabad

Population (2016)
  - Total: 2,672
- Time zone: UTC+3:30 (IRST)

Malek-e Ashtar (Persian: مالك اشتر) (Note: Also romanized as Mālek-e Ashtar; formerly known as Bahādūr Beg; also known as Bahādor Bayk and Bahādor Beyg) is a village in Salehabad Rural District of Salehabad District in Bahar County, Hamadan province, Iran.

== Demographics ==
=== Language ===
Malek-e Ashtar is an Azeri Turkic-speaking village.

=== Population ===
At the time of the 2006 National Census, the village's population was 2,918 in 673 households. The following census in 2011 counted 3,089 people in 899 households. The 2016 census measured the population of the village as 2,672 people in 841 households, the most populous in its rural district.

== Notable people ==
Habiballah Sha’bani Movasaqi, Shia cleric
