= Karkhaneh-ye Qand, Hamadan =

Village and company in Hamadan province, Iran

Karkhaneh-ye Qand Persian: کارخانه قند
- Village/Company
- Location within Iran
- Coordinates: 35°00′51″N 48°35′07″E
- Country: Iran
- Province: Hamadan
- County: Bahar
- District: Lalejin
- Rural District: Mohajeran

Population (2016)
  - Total: 147
- Time zone: UTC+3:30 (IRST)

Karkhaneh-ye Qand (Persian: كارخانه قند) (Note: Also romanized as Kārkhāneh-ye Qand; also known as Kārkhāneh-ye Qand-e Hamedān (کارخانه قند همدان); English: Hamadan Sugar Company) is a village and company in Mohajeran Rural District of Lalejin District in Bahar County, Hamadan province, Iran.

== Demographics ==
=== Population ===
At the time of the 2006 National Census, the village's population was 169 in 46 households. The following census in 2011 counted 170 people in 47 households. The 2016 census measured the population of the village as 147 people in 40 households.
