= Mihamleh-ye Olya =

Village in Hamadan province, Iran

Mihamleh-ye Olya Persian: ميهمله عليا
- Village
- Location within Iran
- Coordinates: 35°06′54″N 48°18′23″E
- Country: Iran
- Province: Hamadan
- County: Bahar
- District: Salehabad
- Rural District: Deymkaran

Population (2016)
  - Total: 785
- Time zone: UTC+3:30 (IRST)

Mihamleh-ye Olya (Persian: ميهمله عليا) (Note: Also romanized as Mīhamleh-ye ‘Olyā; also known as Mīhamleh-ye Bālā, Mihim Olya, and Miyāmleh Bala) is a village in Deymkaran Rural District of Salehabad District in Bahar County, Hamadan province, Iran.

== Demographics ==
=== Population ===
At the time of the 2006 National Census, the village's population was 893 in 205 households. The following census in 2011 counted 939 people in 247 households. The 2016 census measured the population of the village as 785 people in 259 households.
