= Siminehrud Rural District =

Rural district in Hamadan province, Iran

Siminehrud Rural District Persian: دهستان سيمينه‌رود
- Rural District
- Location within Iran
- Coordinates: 34°51′N 48°20′E
- Country: Iran
- Province: Hamadan
- County: Bahar
- District: Central
- Established: 1987
- Capital: Zagheh

Population (2016)
  - Total: 14,646
- Time zone: UTC+3:30 (IRST)

Siminehrud Rural District (Persian: دهستان سيمينه‌رود) is in the Central District of Bahar County, Hamadan province, Iran. Its capital is the village of Zagheh. The previous capital of the rural district was the village of Abrumand, now in Abrumand Rural District.

== Demographics ==
=== Population ===
At the time of the 2006 National Census, the rural district's population was 13,243 in 3,286 households. There were 14,192 inhabitants in 3,973 households at the following census of 2011. The 2016 census measured the population of the rural district as 14,646 in 4,563 households. The most populous of its 12 villages was Zagheh, with 3,328 people.

=== Other villages in the rural district ===
- Chayan
- Fasijan
- Ganj Tappeh
- Gushalan
- Hesar-e Qarah Baghi
- Heydareh-ye Dar-e Emam
- Hoseynabad-e Bahar
- Nurabad-e Simineh
- Robat-e Zafarani
- Simin-e Zagheh
- Vahnan
