= Baba Ali, Hamadan =

Village in Hamadan province, Iran

Baba Ali Persian: باباعلي
- Village
- Location within Iran
- Coordinates: 34°56′04″N 48°12′36″E
- Country: Iran
- Province: Hamadan
- County: Bahar
- District: Salehabad
- Rural District: Salehabad

Population (2016)
  - Total: 418
- Time zone: UTC+3:30 (IRST)

Baba Ali (Persian: باباعلي) (Note: Also romanized as Bābā ‘Alī) is a village in Salehabad Rural District of Salehabad District in Bahar County, Hamadan province, Iran.

== Demographics ==
=== Population ===
At the time of the 2006 National Census, the village's population was 584 in 131 households. The following census in 2011 counted 466 people in 139 households. The 2016 census measured the population of the village as 418 people in 145 households.
