= Rayegan-e Olya =

Village in Hamadan province, Iran

Rayegan-e Olya Persian: رايگان عليا
- Village
- Location within Iran
- Coordinates: 35°04′29″N 48°38′55″E
- Country: Iran
- Province: Hamadan
- County: Bahar
- District: Lalejin
- Rural District: Mohajeran

Population (2016)
  - Total: 311
- Time zone: UTC+3:30 (IRST)

Rayegan-e Olya (Persian: رايگان عليا) (Note: Also romanized as Rāyegān-e ‘Olyā; also known as Rāyegān-e Bālā, Rāykān-e Bālā, Rāykān-e ‘Olyā, and Rikān Bāla) is a village in Mohajeran Rural District of Lalejin District in Bahar County, Hamadan province, Iran.

== Demographics ==
=== Population ===
At the time of the 2006 National Census, the village's population was 387 in 88 households. The following census in 2011 counted 374 people in 84 households. The 2016 census measured the population of the village as 311 people in 97 households.
