= Khvoshab-e Sofla =

Village in Hamadan province, Iran

Khvoshab-e Sofla Persian: خوشاب سفلي
- Village
- Location within Iran
- Coordinates: 35°01′04″N 48°21′26″E
- Country: Iran
- Province: Hamadan
- County: Bahar
- District: Salehabad
- Rural District: Deymkaran

Population (2016)
  - Total: 631
- Time zone: UTC+3:30 (IRST)

Khvoshab-e Sofla (Persian: خوشاب سفلي) (Note: Also romanized as Khowshāb-e Soflá and Khvoshāb-e Soflá; also known as Khvoshāb-e Pā’īn) is a village in Deymkaran Rural District of Salehabad District in Bahar County, Hamadan province, Iran.

== Demographics ==
=== Population ===
At the time of the 2006 National Census, the village's population was 600 in 133 households. The following census in 2011 counted 567 people in 147 households. The 2016 census measured the population of the village as 631 people in 180 households.
