= Salehabad Rural District =

Salehabad Rural District (Persian: دهستان صالح آباد) may refer to:

- Salehabad Rural District (Hamadan Province)
- Salehabad Rural District (Razavi Khorasan Province)
- Salehabad Rural District (Baharestan County), Tehran province

== See also ==
- Salehabad District (disambiguation)
