= Heydareh-ye Dar-e Emam =

Village in Hamadan province, Iran

Heydareh-ye Dar-e Emam Persian: حيدره دارامام
- Village
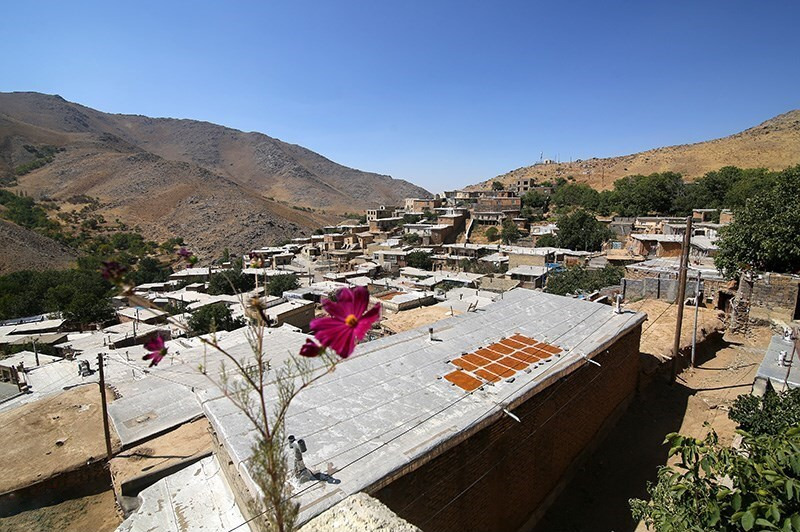
- The village of Heydareh-ye Dar-e Emam

- Location within Iran
- Coordinates: 34°49′15″N 48°20′49″E
- Country: Iran
- Province: Hamadan
- County: Bahar
- District: Central
- Rural District: Siminehrud

Population (2016)
  - Total: 532
- Time zone: UTC+3:30 (IRST)

Heydareh-ye Dar-e Emam (Persian: حيدره دارامام) (Note: Also romanized as Ḩeydareh-ye Dār-e Emām; formerly known as Ḩeydareh-ye Qāẕī Khān (حيدره قاضي‌خان); also known as Heydareh, Ḩeydareh Ghāzī Khān, and Ḩeydareh-ye Ghāẕī Khān) is a village in Siminehrud Rural District of the Central District in Bahar County, Hamadan province, Iran.

== Demographics ==
=== Population ===
At the time of the 2006 National Census, the village's population was 667 in 179 households. The following census in 2011 counted 717 people in 199 households. The 2016 census measured the population of the village as 532 people in 177 households.
