= Qeshlaq-e Hameh Kasi =

Village in Hamadan province, Iran

Qeshlaq-e Hameh Kasi Persian: قشلاق همه كسي
- Village
- Location within Iran
- Coordinates: 34°57′20″N 48°12′38″E
- Country: Iran
- Province: Hamadan
- County: Bahar
- District: Salehabad
- Rural District: Salehabad

Population (2016)
  - Total: 288
- Time zone: UTC+3:30 (IRST)

Qeshlaq-e Hameh Kasi (Persian: قشلاق همه كسي) (Note: Also romanized as Qeshlāq-e Hameh Kasī; also known as Gheshlaghé Hamehkasi and Qeshlāq) is a village in Salehabad Rural District of Salehabad District in Bahar County, Hamadan province, Iran.

== Demographics ==
=== Population ===
At the time of the 2006 National Census, the village's population was 441 in 106 households. The following census in 2011 counted 378 people in 112 households. The 2016 census measured the population of the village as 288 people in 101 households.
