= Gondeh Jin, Bahar =

Village in Hamadan province, Iran

Gondeh Jin Persian: گنده جين
- Village
- Location within Iran
- Coordinates: 34°54′20″N 48°15′24″E
- Country: Iran
- Province: Hamadan
- County: Bahar
- District: Central
- Rural District: Abrumand

Population (2016)
  - Total: 871
- Time zone: UTC+3:30 (IRST)

Gondeh Jin (Persian: گنده جين) (Note: Also romanized as Gandehjīn, Gondeh Jīn, and Gondehjīn; also known as Gandhīn and Ganeh Jīn) is a village in Abrumand Rural District of the Central District in Bahar County, Hamadan province, Iran.

== Demographics ==
=== Population ===
At the time of the 2006 National Census, the village's population was 923 in 200 households. The following census in 2011 counted 896 people in 256 households. The 2016 census measured the population of the village as 871 people in 255 households.
