= Hameh Kasi, Bahar =

Village in Hamadan province, Iran

Hameh Kasi Persian: همه كسي
- Village
- Location within Iran
- Coordinates: 34°58′09″N 48°10′38″E
- Country: Iran
- Province: Hamadan
- County: Bahar
- District: Salehabad
- Rural District: Salehabad

Population (2016)
  - Total: 1,986
- Time zone: UTC+3:30 (IRST)

Hameh Kasi (Persian: همه كسي) (Note: Also romanized as Hameh Kasī; also known as Gardaneh-ye Hameh Kasī and Hamakasī) is a village in Salehabad Rural District of Salehabad District in Bahar County, Hamadan province, Iran.

== Demographics ==
=== Population ===
At the time of the 2006 National Census, the village's population was 2,436 in 574 households. The following census in 2011 counted 2,316 people in 656 households. The 2016 census measured the population of the village as 1,986 people in 634 households.
