= Chopoqlu, Bahar =

Village in Hamadan province, Iran

Chopoqlu Persian: چپق لو
- Village
- Location within Iran
- Coordinates: 35°05′42″N 48°24′58″E
- Country: Iran
- Province: Hamadan
- County: Bahar
- District: Lalejin
- Rural District: Sofalgaran

Population (2016)
  - Total: 427
- Time zone: UTC+3:30 (IRST)

Chopoqlu (Persian: چپق لو) (Note: Also romanized as Chopoqlū) is a village in Sofalgaran Rural District of Lalejin District in Bahar County, Hamadan province, Iran.

== Demographics ==
=== Population ===
At the time of the 2006 National Census, the village's population was 419 in 104 households. The following census in 2011 counted 459 people in 112 households. The 2016 census measured the population of the village as 427 people in 138 households.
