= Mihamleh-ye Sofla =

Village in Hamadan province, Iran

Mihamleh-ye Sofla Persian: ميهمله سفلي
- Village
- Location within Iran
- Coordinates: 35°06′00″N 48°18′28″E
- Country: Iran
- Province: Hamadan
- County: Bahar
- District: Salehabad
- Rural District: Deymkaran

Population (2016)
  - Total: 422
- Time zone: UTC+3:30 (IRST)

Mihamleh-ye Sofla (Persian: ميهمله سفلي) (Note: Also romanized as Mīhamleh-ye Soflá; also known as Mīhamleh-ye Pā'īn) is a village in Deymkaran Rural District of Salehabad District in Bahar County, Hamadan province, Iran.

== Demographics ==
=== Population ===
At the time of the 2006 National Census, the village's population was 412 in 89 households. The following census in 2011 counted 409 people in 115 households. The 2016 census measured the population of the village as 422 people in 141 households.
