= Hoseynabad-e Bahar =

Village in Hamadan province, Iran

Hoseynabad-e Bahar Persian: حسين آبادبهار
- Village
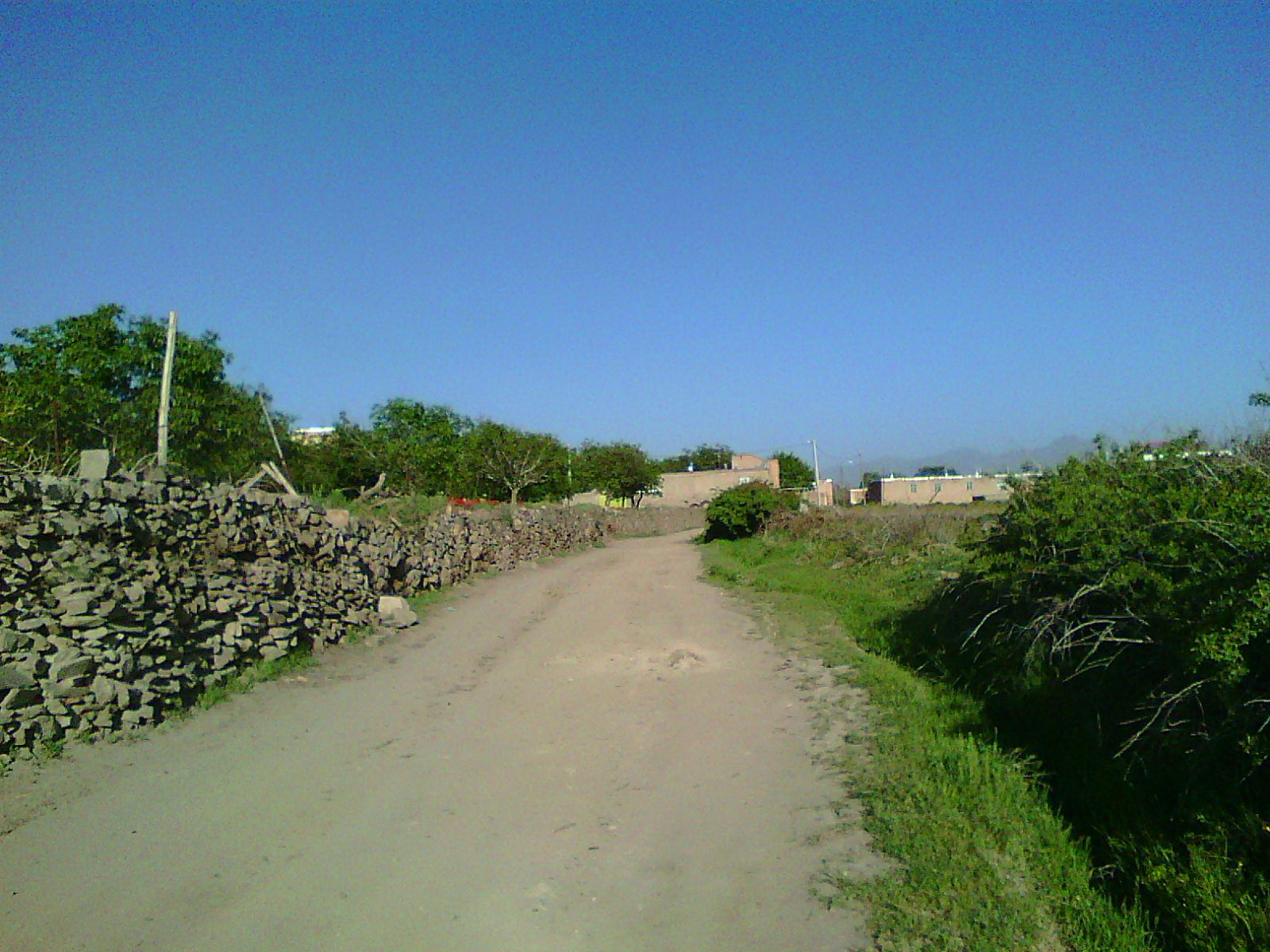
- A road in Hoseynabad-e Bahar with the Alvand Mountains in the background

- Location within Iran
- Coordinates: 34°51′58″N 48°22′06″E
- Country: Iran
- Province: Hamadan
- County: Bahar
- District: Central
- Rural District: Siminehrud

Population (2016)
  - Total: 3,212
- Time zone: UTC+3:30 (IRST)

Hoseynabad-e Bahar (Persian: حسين آبادبهار) (Note: Also romanized as Ḩoseynābād-e Bahār; formerly known as Ya‘qūb Shāh (يعقوب‌شاه)) is a village in Siminehrud Rural District of the Central District in Bahar County, Hamadan province, Iran.

== Demographics ==
=== Population ===
At the time of the 2006 National Census, the village's population was 3,300 in 810 households. The following census in 2011 counted 3,490 people in 957 households. The 2016 census measured the population of the village as 3,212 people in 1,008 households.
