= Khvoshab-e Olya =

Village in Hamadan province, Iran

Khvoshab-e Olya Persian: خوشاب عليا
- Village
- Location within Iran
- Coordinates: 35°01′28″N 48°20′43″E
- Country: Iran
- Province: Hamadan
- County: Bahar
- District: Salehabad
- Rural District: Deymkaran

Population (2016)
  - Total: 551
- Time zone: UTC+3:30 (IRST)

Khvoshab-e Olya (Persian: خوشاب عليا) (Note: Also romanized as Khoshab Olya, Khowshāb-e ‘Olyā, and Khvoshāb-e ‘Olyā; also known as Khūshāb Bāla, Khūshāb-e Bālā, and Khvoshāb-e Bālā) is a village in Deymkaran Rural District of Salehabad District in Bahar County, Hamadan province, Iran.

== Demographics ==
=== Population ===
At the time of the 2006 National Census, the village's population was 598 in 148 households. The following census in 2011 counted 602 people in 184 households. The 2016 census measured the population of the village as 551 people in 174 households.
