= Rayegan-e Sofla =

Village in Hamadan province, Iran

Rayegan-e Sofla Persian: رايگان سفلي
- Village
- Location within Iran
- Coordinates: 35°04′16″N 48°39′48″E
- Country: Iran
- Province: Hamadan
- County: Bahar
- District: Lalejin
- Rural District: Mohajeran

Population (2016)
  - Total: 525
- Time zone: UTC+3:30 (IRST)

Rayegan-e Sofla (Persian: رايگان سفلي) (Note: Also romanized as Rāyegān-e Soflá; also known as Rāykān-e Soflá) is a village in Mohajeran Rural District of Lalejin District in Bahar County, Hamadan province, Iran.

== Demographics ==
=== Population ===
At the time of the 2006 National Census, the village's population was 656 in 123 households. The following census in 2011 counted 623 people in 151 households. The 2016 census measured the population of the village as 525 people in 133 households.
