= Gondeh Jin =

Gondeh Jin or Gandehjin (Persian: گنده جين), also rendered as Ganeh Jin, may refer to:

- Gondeh Jin, Bahar
- Gondeh Jin, Kabudarahang
