= Salehabad District =

Salehabad District may refer to:

- Salehabad District (Hamadan Province) in Iran
- Salehabad District (Ilam Province) in Iran

== See also ==
- Salehabad Rural District (disambiguation)
