= Chopoqlu =

Chopoqlu or Chepeqlu or Chepoqlu or Chopoqolu or Çopoqlu or Chapqolu (Persian: چپقلو or چپق لو), also rendered as Choboqlu or Jabukalu, may refer to various places in Iran:

- Chopoqlu, Bonab, East Azerbaijan Province
- Chopoqlu, Charuymaq, East Azerbaijan Province
- Chapqolu, Meyaneh, East Azerbaijan Province
- Chopoqlu, Bahar, Hamadan Province
- Chopoqlu, Famenin, Hamadan Province
- Chopoqlu, Razan, Hamadan Province
- Chopoqlu, Kurdistan
- Chopoqlu, Howmeh, Zanjan Province
- Chopoqlu, Karasf, Zanjan Province
