= Heydareh =

Heydareh (Persian: حيدره) may refer to:

- Heydareh-ye Dar-e Emam
- Heydareh-ye Posht-e Shahr
