= Yaqub Shah =

Yaqub Shah (Persian: يعقوب شاه) may refer to:

- Yaqub Shah, Bahar
- Yaqub Shah, Tuyserkan
