= Khushab (disambiguation) =

Khushab is a city in Punjab, Pakistan.

Khushab may also refer to:

- Khushab District, a district of Punjab (Pakistan)
- Khushab Tehsil, a tehsil of district Khushab
- Khushab Junction railway station, a railway station in Punjab region.

== See also ==
- Khushab Nuclear Complex, a plutonium production complex.
- Khvoshab (disambiguation), several places in Iran
