= Deymkaran Rural District =

Rural district in Hamadan province, Iran

Deymkaran Rural District Persian: دهستان ديمكاران
- Rural District
- Location within Iran
- Coordinates: 35°05′N 48°16′E
- Country: Iran
- Province: Hamadan
- County: Bahar
- District: Salehabad
- Established: 1987
- Capital: Hasan Qeshlaq

Population (2016)
  - Total: 8,531
- Time zone: UTC+3:30 (IRST)

Deymkaran Rural District (Persian: دهستان ديمكاران) is in Salehabad District of Bahar County, Hamadan province, Iran. Its capital is the village of Hasan Qeshlaq.

== Demographics ==
=== Population ===
At the time of the 2006 National Census, the rural district's population was 9,409 in 2,071 households. There were 9,736 inhabitants in 2,489 households at the following census of 2011. The 2016 census measured the population of the rural district as 8,531 in 2,558 households. The most populous of its 16 villages was Parluk, with 2,020 people.

=== Other villages in the rural district ===
- Akbarabad
- Darband
- Eslamabad
- Gug Tappeh
- Hasan Abdal
- Hoseynabad
- Jafarabad
- Lak
- Khvoshab-e Olya
- Khvoshab-e Sofla
- Mihamleh-ye Olya
- Mihamleh-ye Sofla
- Qarah Aghaj
- Qeydli Bolagh
