= Rasulabad-e Olya =

Village in Hamadan province, Iran

Rasulabad-e Olya Persian: رسول ابادعليا
- Village
- Location within Iran
- Coordinates: 34°50′24″N 48°12′46″E
- Country: Iran
- Province: Hamadan
- County: Bahar
- District: Central
- Rural District: Abrumand

Population (2016)
  - Total: 134
- Time zone: UTC+3:30 (IRST)

Rasulabad-e Olya (Persian: رسول ابادعليا) (Note: Also romanized as Rasūlābād-e ‘Olyā; formerly known as Tājābād-e ‘Olyā (تاج‌آباد عليا); also known as Tājābād and Tājīābād-e ‘Olyā) is a village in Abrumand Rural District of the Central District in Bahar County, Hamadan province, Iran.

== Demographics ==
=== Population ===
At the time of the 2006 National Census, the village's population was 228 in 50 households. The following census in 2011 counted 177 people in 47 households. The 2016 census measured the population of the village as 134 people in 35 households.
