= Mohajeran =

City in Hamadan province, Iran

Mohajeran Persian: مهاجران
- City
- Location within Iran
- Coordinates: 35°04′35″N 48°36′55″E
- Country: Iran
- Province: Hamadan
- County: Bahar
- District: Lalejin
- Established as a city: 2011

Population (2016)
  - Total: 7,331
- Time zone: UTC+3:30 (IRST)

Mohajeran (Persian: مهاجران) (Note: Also romanized as Mahājerān and Mohājerān; also known as Mārān-ī-Muhājran and Muhājīrān) is a city in Lalejin District of Bahar County, Hamadan province, Iran.

== Demographics ==
=== Language ===
Mohajeran is an Azeri Turkic-speaking city.

=== Population ===
At the time of the 2006 National Census, Mohajeran's population was 7,756 in 1,697 households, when it was a village in Mohajeran Rural District. The following census in 2011 counted 7,783 people in 2,165 households. The 2016 census measured the population as 7,331 people in 2,260 households, by which time the village had been converted to a city.
