= Salehabad, Hamadan =

City in Hamadan province, Iran

Salehabad Persian: صالح آباد
- City
- Location within Iran
- Coordinates: 34°55′22″N 48°20′36″E
- Country: Iran
- Province: Hamadan
- County: Bahar
- District: Salehabad
- Established as a city: 1995

Population (2016)
  - Total: 7,899
- Time zone: UTC+3:30 (IRST)

Salehabad (Persian: صالح آباد) (Note: Also romanized as Şāleḩābād; also known as Sālīhābād) is a city in, and the capital of, Salehabad District in Bahar County, Hamadan province, Iran. It also serves as the administrative center for Salehabad Rural District. The village of Salehabad was converted to a city in 1995.

== Demographics ==
=== Population ===
At the time of the 2006 National Census, the city's population was 7,708 in 1,974 households. The following census in 2011 counted 7,830 people in 2,300 households. The 2016 census measured the population of the city as 7,899 people in 2,540 households.

=== Geography ===
Salehabad is situated at an elevation where the sunrise is typically around 04:16 AM and sunset at 05:18 PM, depending on the time of year.
