= Rasulabad-e Sofla =

Village in Hamadan province, Iran

Rasulabad-e Sofla Persian: رسول اباد سفلي
- Village
- Location within Iran
- Coordinates: 34°52′44″N 48°13′06″E
- Country: Iran
- Province: Hamadan
- County: Bahar
- District: Central
- Rural District: Abrumand

Population (2016)
  - Total: 1,901
- Time zone: UTC+3:30 (IRST)

Rasulabad-e Sofla (Persian: رسول اباد سفلي) (Note: Also romanized as Rasūlābād-e Soflá; formerly known as Tājābād-e Soflá (تاج‌آباد سفلي); also known as Tājābād Pāīn, Tājābād-e Pā’īn, and Tājīābād-e Soflá) is a village in Abrumand Rural District of the Central District in Bahar County, Hamadan province, Iran.

== Demographics ==
=== Population ===
At the time of the 2006 National Census, the village's population was 1,855 in 495 households. The following census in 2011 counted 1,725 people in 600 households. The 2016 census measured the population of the village as 1,901 people in 651 households, the most populous in its rural district.
