= Rasulabad, West Azerbaijan =

Rasulabad رسول اباد
- Village
- Location within Iran
- Coordinates: 37°00′25″N 45°53′49″E
- Country: Iran
- Province: West Azerbaijan
- County: Miandoab
- Bakhsh: Central
- Rural District: Mokriyan-e Shomali

Population (2006)
  - Total: 484
- Time zone: UTC+3:30 (IRST)
  - Summer (DST): UTC+4:30 (IRDT)

Rasulabad (Persian: رسول اباد, also Romanized as Rasūlābād) is a village in Mokriyan-e Shomali Rural District, in the Central District of Miandoab County, West Azerbaijan Province, Iran. At the 2006 census, its population was 484, in 114 families.
