= Khashab, Andimeshk =

Coordinates: 30°46′44″N 48°49′19″E

Khashab خشاب
- Village
- Interactive map of Khashab
- Country: Iran
- Province: Khuzestan
- County: Andimeshk
- Bakhsh: Alvar-e Garmsiri
- Rural District: Qilab

Population (2006)
  - Total: 217
- Time zone: UTC+3:30 (IRST)
  - Summer (DST): UTC+4:30 (IRDT)

Khashab (Persian: خشاب, also Romanized as Khashāb) is a village in Qilab Rural District, Alvar-e Garmsiri District, Andimeshk County, Khuzestan Province, Iran. At the 2006 census, its population was 217, in 41 families.
