= Salehabad Rural District (Bahar County) =

Rural district in Hamadan province, Iran

Salehabad Rural District Persian: دهستان صالح آباد
- Rural District
- Location within Iran
- Coordinates: 34°59′N 48°17′E
- Country: Iran
- Province: Hamadan
- County: Bahar
- District: Salehabad
- Established: 1987
- Capital: Salehabad

Population (2016)
  - Total: 9,432
- Time zone: UTC+3:30 (IRST)

Salehabad Rural District (Persian: دهستان صالح آباد) is in Salehabad District of Bahar County, Hamadan province, Iran. It is administered from the city of Salehabad.

== Demographics ==
=== Population ===
At the time of the 2006 National Census, the rural district's population was 10,767 in 2,438 households. There were 10,496 inhabitants in 2,913 households at the following census of 2011. The 2016 census measured the population of the rural district as 9,432 in 2,920 households. The most populous of its 11 villages was Malek-e Ashtar, with 2,672 people.

=== Other villages in the rural district ===
- Aq Kahriz
- Baba Ali
- Gomush Bolagh
- Hameh Kasi
- Jahadabad
- Karimabad
- Khalil Kord
- Pahneh Bar
- Qeshlaq-e Hameh Kasi
- Sarbanlar
