= Sanjabid-e Rayegan =

Sanjabid-e Rayegan سنجابيدرايگان
- Village
- Location within Iran
- Coordinates: 34°14′41″N 47°30′00″E
- Country: Iran
- Province: Kermanshah
- County: Harsin
- Bakhsh: Central
- Rural District: Howmeh

Population (2006)
  - Total: 208
- Time zone: UTC+3:30 (IRST)
  - Summer (DST): UTC+4:30 (IRDT)

Sanjabid-e Rayegan (Persian: سنجابيدرايگان, also Romanized as Sanjābīd-e Rāyegān; also known as Rāyegān, Rāygān, Sanjābī, and Sinjābi) is a village in Howmeh Rural District, in the Central District of Harsin County, Kermanshah Province, Iran. At the 2006 census, its population was 208, in 46 families.
