= Khvoshab, Sanandaj =

Khvoshab خوشاب
- Village
- Location within Iran
- Coordinates: 35°20′31″N 46°45′06″E
- Country: Iran
- Province: Kurdistan
- County: Sanandaj
- Bakhsh: Kalatrazan
- Rural District: Kalatrazan

Population (2006)
  - Total: 258
- Time zone: UTC+3:30 (IRST)
  - Summer (DST): UTC+4:30 (IRDT)

Khvoshab (Persian: خوشاب, also Romanized as Khvoshāb, Khowshāb, and Khushāb) is a village in Kalatrazan Rural District, Kalatrazan District, Sanandaj County, Kurdistan Province, Iran. At the 2006 census, its population was 258, in 65 families. The village is populated by Kurds.
