= Rasulabad, Irandegan =

Rasulabad رسول اباد
- Village
- Location within Iran
- Coordinates: 27°51′33″N 61°07′22″E
- Country: Iran
- Province: Sistan and Baluchestan
- County: Khash
- Bakhsh: Irandegan
- Rural District: Kahnuk

Population (2006)
  - Total: 180
- Time zone: UTC+3:30 (IRST)
  - Summer (DST): UTC+4:30 (IRDT)

Rasulabad (Persian: رسول اباد, also Romanized as Rasūlābād) is a village in Kahnuk Rural District, Irandegan District, Khash County, Sistan and Baluchestan Province, Iran. At the 2006 census, its population was 180, in 44 families.
