= Babaali, Lorestan =

Babaali باباعلي
- Village
- Location within Iran
- Coordinates: 33°43′00″N 47°32′00″E
- Country: Iran
- Province: Lorestan
- County: Kuhdasht
- Bakhsh: Central
- Rural District: Kuhdasht-e Shomali

Population (2006)
  - Total: 20
- Time zone: UTC+3:30 (IRST)
  - Summer (DST): UTC+4:30 (IRDT)

Babaali (Persian: باباعلي, also Romanized as Bābā‘alī; also known as Bābā‘alī-ye Nūrī) is a village in Kuhdasht-e Shomali Rural District, in the Central District of Kuhdasht County, Lorestan Province, Iran. At the 2006 census, its population was 20, in 5 families.
