= Baba Ali, Kermanshah =

Baba Ali باباعلي
- Village
- Location within Iran
- Coordinates: 34°10′54″N 47°25′08″E
- Country: Iran
- Province: Kermanshah
- County: Harsin
- Bakhsh: Central
- Rural District: Cheshmeh Kabud

Population (2006)
  - Total: 152
- Time zone: UTC+3:30 (IRST)
  - Summer (DST): UTC+4:30 (IRDT)

Baba Ali (Persian: باباعلي, also Romanized as Bābā ‘Alī) is a village in Cheshmeh Kabud Rural District, in the Central District of Harsin County, Kermanshah Province, Iran. At the 2006 census, its population was 152, in 34 families.
