= Mohajeran Rural District =

Rural district in Hamadan province, Iran

Mohajeran Rural District Persian: دهستان مهاجران
- Rural District
- Location within Iran
- Coordinates: 35°02′N 48°35′E
- Country: Iran
- Province: Hamadan
- County: Bahar
- District: Lalejin
- Established: 1987
- Capital: Hoseynabad-e Latka

Population (2016)
  - Total: 10,694
- Time zone: UTC+3:30 (IRST)

Mohajeran Rural District (Persian: دهستان مهاجران) is in Lalejin District of Bahar County, Hamadan province, Iran. Its capital is the village of Hoseynabad-e Latka.

== Demographics ==
=== Population ===
At the time of the 2006 National Census, the rural district's population was 19,292 in 4,406 households. There were 19,355 inhabitants in 5,314 households at the following census of 2011. The 2016 census measured the population of the rural district as 10,694 in 3,249 households. The most populous of its 18 villages was Dastjerd, with 2,955 people.

=== Other villages in the rural district ===
- Aq Bolagh-e Latgah
- Karkhaneh-ye Qand
- Kushkabad
- Latgah
- Rah Hamvar
- Rayegan-e Olya
- Rayegan-e Sofla
- Soleymanabad
