= Bahar, Iran =

City in Hamadan province, Iran

Bahar Persian: بهار
- City
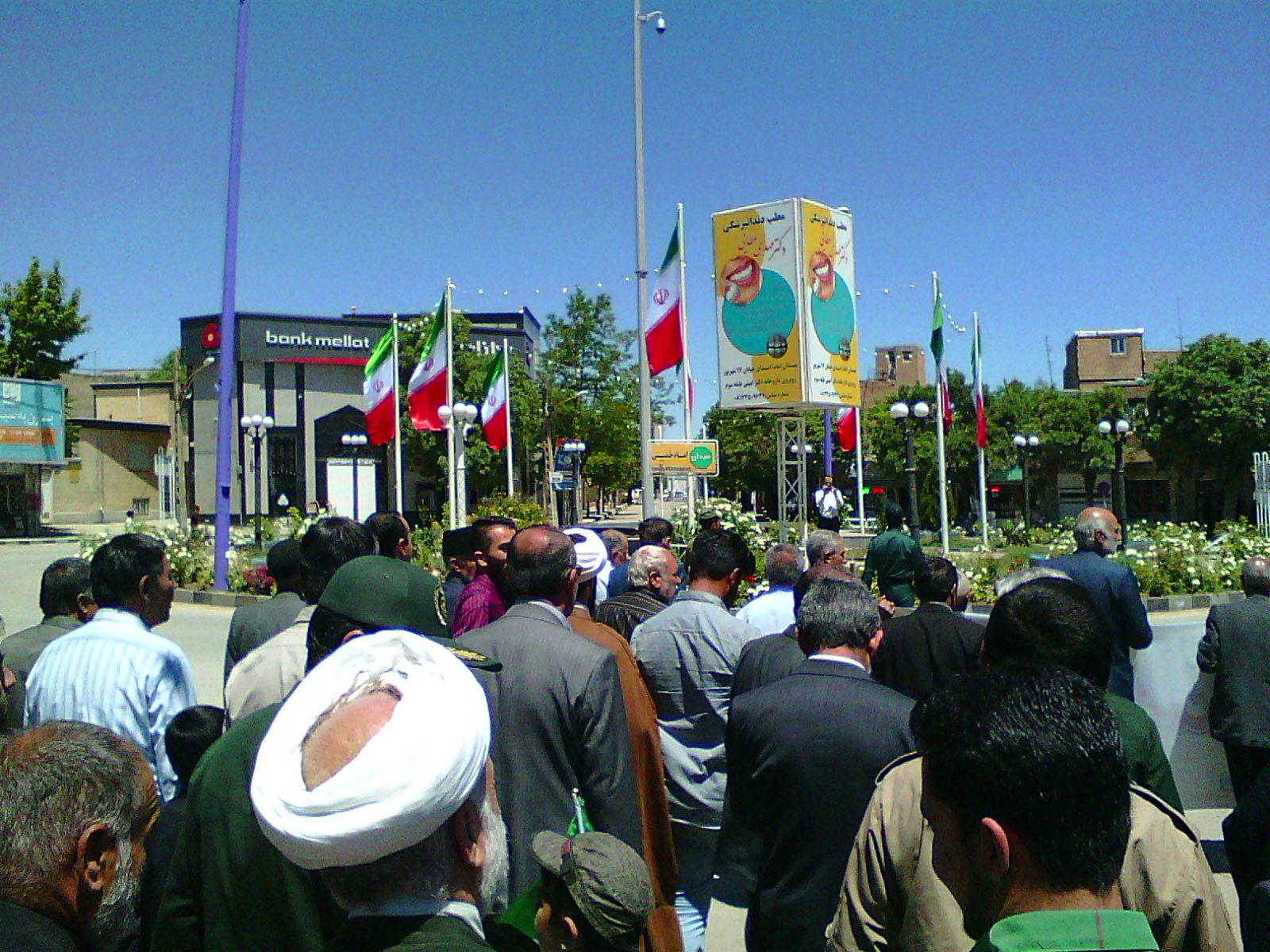

- Location within Iran
- Coordinates: 34°54′28″N 48°26′22″E
- Country: Iran
- Province: Hamadan
- County: Bahar
- District: Central

Population (2016)
  - Total: 28,685
- Time zone: UTC+3:30 (IRST)

Bahar (Persian: بهار) (Note: Also romanized as Bahār) is a city in the Central District of Bahar County, Hamadan province, Iran, serving as capital of both the county and the district.

== Demographics ==
=== Population ===
At the time of the 2006 National Census, the city's population was 27,271 in 6,956 households. The following census in 2011 counted 27,645 people in 7,914 households. The 2016 census measured the population of the city as 8,953 households.
