= Khvosh Ab, Jahrom =

Khvosh Ab خوش آب
- Village
- Location within Iran
- Coordinates: 28°25′03″N 52°58′32″E
- Country: Iran
- Province: Fars
- County: Jahrom
- Bakhsh: Central
- Rural District: Jolgah

Population (2006)
  - Total: 44
- Time zone: UTC+3:30 (IRST)
  - Summer (DST): UTC+4:30 (IRDT)

Khvosh Ab (Persian: خوش آب, also Romanized as Khvosh Āb) is a village in Jolgah Rural District, in the Central District of Jahrom County, Fars province, Iran. At the 2006 census, its population was 44, in 8 families.
