= Khashab, Shadegan =

Khashab خشاب
- Village
- Location within Iran
- Coordinates: 30°46′40″N 48°49′30″E
- Country: Iran
- Province: Khuzestan
- County: Shadegan
- Bakhsh: Central
- Rural District: Hoseyni

Population (2006)
  - Total: 210
- Time zone: UTC+3:30 (IRST)
  - Summer (DST): UTC+4:30 (IRDT)

Khashab (Persian: خشاب, also Romanized as Khashāb and Khoshāb; also known as Khashshāb) is a village in Hoseyni Rural District, in the Central District of Shadegan County, Khuzestan Province, Iran. At the 2006 census, its population was 210, in 37 families.
