= Sofalgaran Rural District =

Rural district in Hamadan province, Iran

Sofalgaran Rural District Persian: دهستان سفالگران
- Rural District
- Location within Iran
- Coordinates: 35°02′N 48°27′E
- Country: Iran
- Province: Hamadan
- County: Bahar
- District: Lalejin
- Established: 1987
- Capital: Dinarabad

Population (2016)
  - Total: 8,442
- Time zone: UTC+3:30 (IRST)

Sofalgaran Rural District (Persian: دهستان سفالگران) is in Lalejin District of Bahar County, Hamadan province, Iran. Its capital is the village of Dinarabad.

== Demographics ==
=== Population ===
At the time of the 2006 National Census, the rural district's population was 10,587 in 2,469 households. There were 10,773 inhabitants in 2,837 households at the following census of 2011. The 2016 census measured the population of the rural district as 8,442 in 2,550 households. The most populous of its nine villages was Dinarabad, with 2,300 people.

=== Other villages in the rural district ===
- Chopoqlu
- Dahnejerd
- Gonbadan
- Harunabad
- Jamshidabd
- Mirza Hesari
- Sari Qamish
- Tazeh Kand
