= Abrumand Rural District =

Rural district in Hamadan province, Iran

Abrumand Rural District Persian: دهستان آبرومند
- Rural District
- Location within Iran
- Coordinates: 34°51′45″N 48°14′48″E
- Country: Iran
- Province: Hamadan
- County: Bahar
- District: Central
- Established: 1997
- Capital: Abrumand

Population (2016)
  - Total: 8,506
- Time zone: UTC+3:30 (IRST)

Abrumand Rural District (Persian: دهستان آبرومند) is in the Central District of Bahar County, Hamadan province, Iran. Its capital is the village of Abrumand.

== Demographics ==
=== Population ===
At the time of the 2006 National Census, the rural district's population was 8,624 in 1,985 households. There were 8,551 inhabitants in 2,407 households at the following census of 2011. The 2016 census measured the population of the rural district as 8,506 in 2,536 households. The most populous of its 11 villages was Rasulabad-e Sofla, with 1,901 people.

=== Other villages in the rural district ===
- Ab Barik
- Akhtachi
- Cheshmeh Kabud
- Chowtash
- Deh Now
- Gondeh Jin
- Rasulabad-e Olya
- Ravan
- Sang-e Sefid
