= Lalejin District =

District in Hamadan province, Iran

Lalejin District Persian: بخش لالجین
- District
- Location within Iran
- Coordinates: 35°02′N 48°31′E
- Country: Iran
- Province: Hamadan
- County: Bahar
- Established: 1993
- Capital: Lalejin

Population (2016)
  - Total: 41,383
- Time zone: UTC+3:30 (IRST)

Lalejin District (Persian: بخش لالجین) is in Bahar County, Hamadan province, Iran. Its capital is the city of Lalejin.

== History ==
The village of Mohajeran was converted to a city in 2011.

== Demographics ==
=== Population ===
At the time of the 2006 National Census, the district's population was 44,568 in 10,635 households. The following census in 2011 counted 45,419 people in 12,640 households. The 2016 census measured the population of the district as 41,383 inhabitants in 12,774 households.

=== Administrative divisions ===
Lalejin District Population
Administrative Divisions	2006	2011	2016
Mohajeran RD	19,292	19,355	10,694
Sofalgaran RD	10,587	10,773	8,442
Lalejin (city)	14,689	15,291	14,916
Mohajeran (city)			7,331
Total	44,568	45,419	41,383
RD = Rural District
