= Central District (Bahar County) =

District in Hamadan province, Iran

Central District (Bahar County) Persian: بخش مرکزی شهرستان بهار
- District
- Location within Iran
- Coordinates: 34°51′N 48°19′E
- Country: Iran
- Province: Hamadan
- County: Bahar
- Established: 1993
- Capital: Bahar

Population (2016)
  - Total: 51,837
- Time zone: UTC+3:30 (IRST)

The Central District of Bahar County (Persian: بخش مرکزی شهرستان بهار) is in Hamadan province, Iran. Its capital is the city of Bahar.

== Demographics ==
=== Population ===
At the time of the 2006 National Census, the district's population was 49,138 in 12,227 households. The following census in 2011 counted 50,388 people in 14,294 households. The 2016 census measured the population of the district as 51,837 inhabitants in 16,054 households.

=== Administrative divisions ===
Central District (Bahar County) Population
Administrative Divisions	2006	2011	2016
Abrumand RD	8,624	8,551	8,506
Siminehrud RD	13,243	14,192	14,646
Bahar (city)	27,271	27,645	28,685
Total	49,138	50,388	51,837
RD = Rural District
