= Salehabad District (Bahar County) =

District in Hamadan province, Iran

Salehabad District Persian: بخش صالح‌آباد
- District
- Location within Iran
- Coordinates: 35°02′05″N 48°16′46″E
- Country: Iran
- Province: Hamadan
- County: Bahar
- Established: 1997
- Capital: Salehabad

Population (2016)
  - Total: 25,862
- Time zone: UTC+3:30 (IRST)

Salehabad District (Persian: بخش صالح‌آباد) is in Bahar County, Hamadan province, Iran. Its capital is the city of Salehabad.

== Demographics ==
=== Population ===
At the time of the 2006 National Census, the district's population was 27,884 in 6,483 households. The following census in 2011 counted 28,062 people in 7,702 households. The 2016 census measured the population of the district as 25,862 inhabitants in 8,018 households.

=== Administrative divisions ===
Salehabad District Population
Administrative Divisions	2006	2011	2016
Deymkaran RD	9,409	9,736	8,531
Salehabad RD	10,767	10,496	9,432
Salehabad (city)	7,708	7,830	7,899
Total	27,884	28,062	25,862
RD = Rural District
