= Bahar County =

County in Hamadan province, Iran

Bahar County Persian: شهرستان بهار
- County
- Location of Bahar County in Hamadan province (center, pink)

- Location of Hamadan province in Iran
- Coordinates: 34°57′N 48°26′E
- Country: Iran
- Province: Hamadan
- Established: 1993
- Capital: Bahar
- Districts: Central, Lalejin, Salehabad

Population (2016)
  - Total: 119,082
- Time zone: UTC+3:30 (IRST)

Bahar County (Persian: شهرستان بهار) is in Hamadan province, Iran. Its capital is the city of Bahar.

== History ==
The village of Mohajeran was converted to a city in 2011.

== Demographics ==
=== Population ===
At the time of the 2006 National Census, the county's population was 121,590 in 29,345 households. The following census in 2011 counted 123,869 people in 34,621 households. The 2016 census measured the population of the county as 119,082 in 36,844 households.

=== Administrative divisions ===
Bahar County's population history and administrative structure over three consecutive censuses are shown in the following table.

Bahar County Population
Administrative Divisions	2006	2011	2016
Central District	49,138	50,388	51,837
Abrumand RD	8,624	8,551	8,506
Siminehrud RD	13,243	14,192	14,646
Bahar (city)	27,271	27,645	28,685
Lalejin District	44,568	45,419	41,383
Mohajeran RD	19,292	19,355	10,694
Sofalgaran RD	10,587	10,773	8,442
Lalejin (city)	14,689	15,291	14,916
Mohajeran (city)			7,331
Salehabad District	27,884	28,062	25,862
Deymkaran RD	9,409	9,736	8,531
Salehabad RD	10,767	10,496	9,432
Salehabad (city)	7,708	7,830	7,899
Total	121,590	123,869	119,082
RD = Rural District

== See also ==
Media related to Bahar County at Wikimedia Commons
